= List of rural localities in Vladimir Oblast =

Map of Russia with Vladimir Oblast highlighted

This is a list of rural localities in Vladimir Oblast. Vladimir Oblast (Russian: Влади́мирская о́бласть, Vladimirskaya oblast) is a federal subject of Russia (an oblast). Its administrative center is the city of Vladimir, which is located 190 kilometers (120 mi) east of Moscow. As of the 2010 Census, the oblast's population was 1,443,693.

== Alexandrovsky District ==
Rural localities in Alexandrovsky District:

- Afanasyevo
- Afonasovo
- Agafonka
- Aksenovka
- Alabukhino
- Aleksino
- Andreyevskoye
- Anisimka
- Antonka
- Arkhanka
- Arsaki
- Arsaki
- Bakino
- Baksheyevo
- Banevo
- Bashkino
- Bazunovo
- Belteyevka
- Bolshiye Vyoski
- Bolshoye Karinskoye
- Bolshoye Marinkino
- Bolshoye Mikhalyovo
- Bolshoye Shimonovo
- Brykovy Gory
- Bukhary
- Bunkovo
- Chernetskoye
- Chetvert
- Chislavl
- Danilkovo
- Daryino
- Demyanovo
- Dolgopolye
- Dolmatovo
- Dubna
- Dudenevo
- Dvoriki
- Fedyaykovo
- Fyodorovskoye
- Gideyevo
- Godunovo
- Goltsovo
- Gorki
- Gorki
- Grigorovo
- Grigorovo
- Grigorovo
- Irkovo
- Isayevka
- Iskra
- Ivankovo
- Ivanovo-Sobolevo
- Ivanovskoye, Andreyevskoye Rural Settlement
- Ivanovskoye, Karinskoye Rural Settlement
- Izmaylovo
- Kablukovo
- Kalinino
- Kamenka
- Kashino
- Kholopovo
- Khoroshevo
- Klemyachevo
- Klenovka
- Kolpakovo
- Komshilovo
- Konishchevo
- Konyukhovo
- Koptsevo
- Kopylikha
- Korely
- Koskovo
- Kozlakovo
- Krasnaya Roshcha
- Krasnoye Plamya
- Kruglyshevo
- Krutets
- Kudrino
- Kulikovka
- Kurganikha
- Legkovo
- Leninskaya Sloboda
- Lisavy
- Lizunovo
- Lobkovo
- Luch
- Lukyantsevo
- Lunyovo
- Makhra
- Malinovo
- Maloye Karinskoye
- Maloye Marinkino
- Maloye Mikhalyovo
- Maloye Shimonovo
- Malye Vyoski
- Marino
- Maryonkino
- Mashkovo
- Mayak
- Mayovka
- Maysky
- Mezhakovo
- Monastyryovo
- Moshnino
- Myachkovo
- Naumovo
- Nedyurevka
- Neglovo
- Nikolayevka
- Novosyolka, Andreyevskoye Rural Settlement
- Novosyolka, Slednevskoye Rural Settlement
- Novovoskresenskoye
- Novozhilovo
- Obashevo
- Patkino
- Perematkino
- Pesochnaya
- Petrakovo
- Pikalevo
- Plekhany
- Ploshchevo
- Podsosenye
- Podvyazye
- Pokrov
- Polinosovo
- Porechye
- Posyolok Torfopredpriyatiya
- Posyolok imeni Lenina
- Povarovo
- Prechistino, Andreevsky Rural Settlement
- Prechistino, Slednevskoye Rural Settlement
- Prokino
- Prokofyevo
- Pustyn
- Ratkovo
- Romanovo
- Romanovskoye
- Rozhdestveno
- Rupusovo
- Ryabinino
- Ryuminskoye
- Samarino
- Shablykino
- Shchekotovo
- Shikhovo
- Shiklovo
- Shimokhtino
- Shushkovo
- Sivkovo
- Slednevo
- Snyatinovo
- Sokolovo
- Sorokino
- Spornovo
- Stanovishchi
- Staraya
- Staraya Sloboda
- Starinki
- Starovo
- Stepanikha
- Stepanikha
- Stepkovo
- Sushchyovo
- Suslovka
- Svetly
- Svinkino
- Taratino
- Tatyanino
- Temkino
- Tiribrovo
- Tirinovo
- Turgenevo
- Vedevo
- Vertyagino
- Veski
- Vishnyakovo
- Volodino
- Voskresenskoye
- Vyalkovka
- Vyazmino
- Yam
- Yanshino
- Yelkino
- Yelovki
- Yurtsovo
- Zelentsino
- Zhabrevo
- Zhelnino
- Zhuklino
- Zinovyevo
- Zvyaginy Gory

== Gorokhovetsky District ==
Rural localities in Gorokhovetsky District:

- Aksakovo
- Alfyorovo
- Arefino
- Balandino
- Bereznitsy
- Bogorodskoye
- Bolshaya Karpovka
- Bolshiye Luzhki
- Bolshoye Sokurovo
- Botulino
- Bykasovo
- Byltsyno
- Chernenkovo
- Chudskaya
- Chulkovo
- Chulkovo
- Denisovo
- Dubovo
- Dubrovo
- Fedorkovo
- Fominki
- Galitsy
- Gashkino
- Gonchary
- Gorlovka
- Gornoye Tatarintsevo
- Gorodishchi
- Grishino
- Gruzdevsky
- Istomino
- Ivachevo
- Kartaganovo
- Khabalyovo
- Khoroshevo
- Khoroshevo
- Knyazhichi
- Kolesnikovo
- Kondyurino
- Kopsovo
- Korovkino
- Koshelikha
- Kozhino
- Kraskovo
- Krasnaya Yablon
- Kruglovo
- Krutovo
- Krylovo
- Kuplya
- Kupriyanovo
- Leonovo
- Lesnoye Tatarintsevo
- Lipovka
- Litovka
- Luchinki
- Lykshino
- Malaya Karpovka
- Malinovo
- Malye Luzhki
- Manylovo
- Melkishevo
- Mikhaylovskaya
- Misyurevo
- Mitino
- Mokeyevo
- Molodniki
- Morozovka
- Murakovo
- Myasnikovo
- Nikitkino
- Novishki
- Novokostsy
- Novosemyonovka
- Novovladimirovka
- Osinki
- Otvodnoye
- Ovinishchi
- Pavlikovo
- Pershino
- Petrunino
- Pochinki
- Pogost
- Proletarsky
- Prosye
- Rassvet
- Rastrigino
- Rebrovo
- Rotkovo
- Rozhdestveno
- Safoneyevo
- Sapunovo
- Seltso
- Semyonovka
- Shankovo
- Shubino
- Shuklino
- Slobodishchi
- Sluchkovo
- Slukino
- Sumarokovo
- Svetilnovo
- Svyato
- Taranovo
- Tarkhanovo
- Telepovo
- Timiryazevo
- Torfopredpriyatiya Bolshoye
- Turakovo
- Vamna
- Vasenino
- Velikovo
- Veretenkovo
- Vetelnitsy
- Vnukovo
- Vyezd
- Yakutino
- Yeskino
- Yurovo
- Yuryatino
- Zaozerye
- Zelyony Dol
- Zolotovo
- Zykovo

== Gus-Khrustalny ==
Rural localities in Gus-Khrustalny urban okrug:

- Panfilovo

== Gus-Khrustalny District ==
Rural localities in Gus-Khrustalny District:

- Abbakumovo
- Aksenovo
- Alexandrovka
- Alfyorovo
- Andreyevskaya
- Anopino
- Aristovo
- Arsamaki
- Babino
- Baranovo
- Bobry
- Bolshaya Artyomovka
- Borisovo
- Borisovo
- Borzinka
- Borzino
- Budevichi
- Butylki
- Chaslitsy
- Chersevo
- Chiur
- Chyokovo
- Davydovo
- Demidovo
- Dmitriyevo
- Dobryatino
- Dolbino
- Dubasovo
- Dubrovsky
- Dudor
- Dyomino
- Erleks
- Fedotovo
- Filatovo
- Fomino
- Fyodorovka
- Gavrino
- Georgiyevo
- Golovari
- Grigoryevo
- Gubtsevo
- Ikshevo
- Ilyichyovka
- Ilyino
- Ivanishchi
- Ivanovka
- Izbishchi
- Kharlamovo
- Kolp
- Komissarovka
- Konstantinovo
- Krasnaya Zarya
- Krasny Oktyabr
- Krasny Posyolok
- Krasny Yakor
- Kryukovo
- Kupreyevo
- Kurlovo
- Kuzmino
- Larinskaya
- Lazarevka
- Lesnaya
- Lesnikovo
- Lobanovo
- Makhinsky
- Makhonino
- Maklaki
- Malaya Artyomovka
- Malinki
- Malyshkino
- Malyukovsky
- Maslikha
- Mezinovsky
- Mikhali
- Miltsevo
- Mitenino
- Mokroye
- Mordvinovo
- Morugino
- Nagorny
- Narmoch
- Narmuch
- Nechayevskaya
- Neklyudovo
- Neklyudovo
- Neverovsky
- Nikulino
- Novo-Durovo
- Novo-Maltsevo
- Novo-Novlyanovo
- Novo-Pokrovskoye
- Novoopokino
- Novouvarovka
- Obdikhovo
- Oblepikha
- Okatovo
- Orlovo
- Ostashevo
- Ostrova
- Ovintsy
- Palishchi
- Parakhino
- Pavlikovo
- Perovo
- Pershkovo
- Pervomaysky
- Poboyki
- Pochinki
- Popovichi
- Potapkovo
- Potapovskaya
- Prokshino
- Pshenitsino
- Rastovo
- Ryazanovo
- Savikovo
- Savinskaya
- Semyonovka
- Shabanovo
- Shevertni
- Sintsovo
- Sivtsevo
- Spudni
- Starkovo
- Staroopokino
- Stepanovo
- Sulovo
- Talanovo
- Talnovo
- Tashchilovo
- Tasino
- Tasinsky
- Tasinsky Bor
- Tikhonovo
- Timenka
- Tolstikovo
- Trufanovo
- Tsikul
- Tyurvishchi
- Ulyakhino
- Urshelsky
- Usady
- Vashutino
- Vasilyovo
- Vasilyovo
- Vekovka
- Velikodvorsky
- Velikodvorye
- Vyoshki
- Vyrytovo
- Yagodino
- Yakimets
- Yazvitsy
- Zabolotye
- Zakharovo
- Zakolpye
- Zakolpye
- Zalesye
- Zelyony Dol
- Zhary
- Zolotkovo
- Zolotkovsky

== Kameshkovsky District ==
Rural localities in Kameshkovsky District:

- Abrosimovo
- Aksentsevo
- Andreytsevo
- Arefino
- Balmyshevo
- Berkovo
- Bliznino
- Borodino
- Bryzgalovo
- Burakovo
- Chistukha
- Davydovo
- Dmitrikovo
- Druzhba
- Dvoriki
- Edemskoye
- Filyandino
- Fomikha
- Gatikha
- Gavrilsevo
- Glazovo
- Gorki
- Gorki
- Gorodok
- Grezino
- Istomino
- Ivashkovo
- Ivishenye
- Kamenovo
- Karyakino
- Kharlamovo
- Khokhlovo
- Kiryushino
- Kizhany
- Kolosovo
- Krasnoramenye
- Krasnoznamensky
- Kruglovo
- Krutovo
- Kunitsyno
- Kurmenyovo
- Laptevo
- Leontyevo
- Loshaikha
- Lubenkino
- Lubentsy
- Makarikha
- Maryinka
- Mikshino
- Mirny
- Mishnevo
- Mokeyevo
- Mostsy
- Nazarovo
- Nerlinka
- Nesterkovo
- Neverkovo
- Novaya Bykovka
- Novaya Pechuga
- Novaya Zarya
- Novki
- Novki
- Novosyolka
- Novskoye
- Ostrov
- Palashkino
- Patakino
- Penkino
- Pirogovo
- Pishchikhino
- Plyasitsyno
- Posyolok imeni Artyoma
- Posyolok imeni Frunze
- Posyolok imeni Gorkogo
- Posyolok imeni Karla Marksa
- Posyolok imeni Kirova
- Posyolok imeni Krasina
- Posyolok sanatoriya imeni Lenina
- Pozharnitsy
- Pridorozhny
- Privolye
- Ruchkino
- Ryabinovka
- Ryakhovo
- Saulovo
- Semenigino
- Serebrovo
- Sergeikha
- Shchekino
- Shukhurdino
- Simakovo
- Simonovo
- Sosnovka
- Staraya Nikola
- Stupino
- Suslovo
- Synkovo
- Terekhovitsy
- Tyntsy
- Usolye
- Vakurino
- Varkhomeyevo
- Vereshchagino
- Volkovoyno
- Vorynino
- Voskresenskoye
- Vtorovo
- Vysokovo
- Yuratino
- Zauichye
- Zhuikha

== Kirzhachsky District ==
Rural localities in Kirzhachsky District:

- Afanasovo
- Akulovo
- Alenino
- Arefino
- Baburino
- Bardovo
- Barsovo
- Belkovo
- Belkovo
- Beltsy
- Berezhki
- Bukhlovo
- Bynino
- Dubki
- Dubrovka
- Dvorishchi
- Filippovskoye
- Fineyevo
- Funikova Gora
- Fyodorovskoye
- Golovino
- Gorka
- Gribanovo
- Ignatovo
- Ileykino
- Ilkino
- Ilyinskoye
- Ivashevo
- Karpovo
- Karpovshchina
- Kashino
- Khalino
- Kharlamovo
- Khmelevo
- Khrapki
- Khvostovo
- Kiprevo
- Klimkovo
- Klimovo
- Korytovo
- Koshelevo
- Krasilovo
- Krasny Gornyak
- Krasny Ogorok
- Krasny Ugol
- Krutets
- Kudrino
- Kurbatovo
- Lisitsyno
- Lisitsyno
- Marinkino
- Melezha
- Mitino
- Myzzhelovo
- Naumovo
- Nedyurevo
- Nikiforovo
- Nikitkino
- Novosyolovo
- Ofushino
- Peregudovo
- Pershino
- Pesyane
- Petukhovo
- Polutino
- Ratkovo
- Rozhkovo
- Ryazanki
- Savelyevo
- Savino
- Semyonovskoye
- Sergiyevka
- Shuvalovo
- Skomorokhovo
- Slobodka
- Smolnevo
- Sopovskiye Zemlyanki
- Starkovo
- Starovo
- Telvyakovo
- Trokhino
- Trutnevo
- Vasilyovo
- Vlasyevo
- Yasnaya Polyana
- Yefanovo
- Yefremovo
- Yeltsy
- Yurtsovo
- Zakharovo
- Zarechye
- Zheldybino
- Zheldybino
- Zherdevo
- Zherdeyevo
- Znamenskoye

== Kolchuginsky District ==
Rural localities in Kolchuginsky District:

- Abramovka
- Aleksino
- Aleshki
- Avdotyino
- Bakinets
- Baranovka
- Barykino
- Barykino
- Bashkirdovo
- Bavleny
- Bavleny
- Berechino
- Beryozovaya Roshcha
- Bogorodskoye
- Boldinka
- Bolshevik
- Bolshoye Bratsevo
- Bolshoye Grigorovo
- Bolshoye Kuzminskoye
- Bolshoye Zabelino
- Boristsevo
- Bukharino
- Davydovskoye
- Dmitriyevsky Pogost
- Dubki
- Dubki
- Dyakonovo
- Florishchi
- Glyadki
- Golyazh
- Gorbatovka
- Ilyinskoye
- Ivashkovo
- Kashino
- Klementyevo
- Kliny
- Kliny
- Konyshevo
- Kopylki
- Korobovshchina
- Korobovshchinsky
- Koskovka
- Kosteyevo
- Kozhino
- Krasnaya Gora
- Krasny Ruchey
- Krivdino
- Krivtsovo
- Kudryavtsevo
- Ladozhino
- Lavrenikha
- Levashovo
- Litvinovo
- Litvinovo
- Litvinovskiye Khutora
- Lychyovo
- Makarovo
- Maloye Bratsevo
- Marino
- Maryino
- Metallist
- Miklyaikha
- Nefyodovka
- Nikolayevka
- Nogosekovo
- Novino
- Novobusino
- Novofetinino
- Novofrolovskoye
- Novosyolka
- Novosyolka
- Novoye
- Obukhovo
- Ogibka
- Olisavino
- Osino
- Otyayevka
- Paddubki
- Panteleyevo
- Pavlovka
- Petrushino
- Polyany
- Pozdnyakovo
- Prokudino
- Razdolye
- Safonovo
- Semendyukovo
- Serp i Molot
- Shkolny
- Shustino
- Skorodumka
- Sloboda
- Slugino
- Snegiryovo
- Sobino
- Staraya Tolba
- Staraya
- Stenki
- Sukmanikha
- Timoshkino
- Toporishchevo
- Tovarkovo
- Troitsa
- Tyutkovo
- Ulyanikha
- Vaulovo
- Vorontsovo
- Voskresenskoye
- Yakovlevo
- Yeltsino
- Yesiplevo
- Yezhovo
- Zapazhye
- Zavalino
- Zaykovo
- Zhuravlikha
- Zinovyevo
- Zolotukha

== Kovrovsky District ==
Rural localities in Kovrovsky District:

- Aksenikha
- Alachino
- Alexeyevskoye
- Andreyevka
- Anokhino
- Artyomovo
- Ashcherino
- Ashcherinsky karyer
- Avdotyino
- Baberikha
- Babikovka
- Baburino
- Babyonki
- Baranovo
- Bedrino
- Belkovo
- Berchakovo
- Bizimovo
- Bliznino
- Bolotsky
- Bolshakovo
- Bolshiye Vsegodichi
- Chentsy
- Cheremkha
- Chernevo
- Chernositovo
- Denisovka
- Dmitriyevo
- Dmitriyevskoye
- Doronikha
- Dostizheniye
- Drozdovka
- Dushkino
- Dyomino
- Esino
- Fatyanovo
- Fedyunino
- Filino
- Gigant
- Glebovo
- Golyshevo
- Gorozhyonovo
- Gostyukhino
- Gostyukhino
- Gostyukhinskogo karyera
- Govyadikha
- Gridino
- Igumnovo
- Ilyino
- Ivakino
- Ivanovo
- Kanabyevo
- Kariki
- Khoryatino
- Khvatachevo
- Kislyakovo
- Klyazminsky Gorodok
- Klyushnikovo
- Knyaginino
- Knyazhskaya
- Kochetikha
- Kostyunino
- Krasnaya Griva
- Krasny Mayak
- Krasny Oktyabr
- Krestnikovo
- Krestnikovo
- Krutovo
- Kryachkovo
- Kusakino
- Kuvezino
- Kuznechikha
- Lyubets
- Makarovo
- Malygino
- Malyshevo
- Malye Vsegodichi
- Marinino
- Martemyanovo
- Maryino
- Medyntsevo
- Milinovo
- Mitsino
- Mordviny
- Moshachikha
- Nerekhta
- Novinki
- Novoberyozovo
- Novoye
- Novy
- Obrashchikha
- Osipovo
- Otrub
- Ovsyannikovo
- Pakino
- Panteleyevo
- Panyukino
- Patrikeyevo
- Pavlovskoye
- Peresekino
- Pervomaysky
- Pestovo
- Ploskovo
- Pobochnevo
- Pogorelka
- Pogost
- Polevaya
- Posyolok sanatoriya imeni Abelmana
- Pustynka
- Repniki
- Rogozinikha
- Ruchey
- Rusino
- Ryabinnitsy
- Sannikovo
- Sazhino
- Seltso
- Senino
- Seninskiye Dvoriki
- Sergeytsevo
- Serkovo
- Shchibrovo
- Shevinskaya
- Shilovskoye
- Shirilikha
- Shmelyovo
- Shusherino
- Singor
- Skomorokhovo
- Smekhra
- Smolino
- Staraya
- Stepanovo
- Sukhanikha
- Sychyovo
- Teterino
- Troitsko-Nikolskoye
- Tsepelyovo
- Uvarovka
- Velikovo
- Vereyki
- Verkhutikha
- Voskhod
- Vysokovo
- Yelnikovo
- Yenikha
- Yudikha
- Yurino
- Zarya

== Melenkovsky District ==
Rural localities in Melenkovsky District:

- Adino
- Alexandrino
- Amosovo
- Anokhino
- Arkhangel
- Barsuki
- Bolshaya Sala
- Bolshoy Priklon
- Bolshoy Sanchur
- Boytsevo
- Butylitsy
- Chabyshevo
- Chernichenka
- Danilovo
- Denyatino
- Derevnishchi
- Dmitriyevo
- Dmitriyevy Gory
- Dobryatino
- Domnino
- Dubrovka
- Dubtsy
- Durasovo
- Dvoyezyory
- Dvoynovo
- Fursovo
- Gorodishchi
- Gorokhovo
- Grigorovo
- Ilkino
- Ivatino
- Kamenka
- Kaznevo
- Kesovo
- Kholkovo
- Kholkovsky
- Kochetki
- Kochetki
- Kondakovo
- Kononovo
- Kopnino
- Korikovo
- Korovino
- Krasnovo
- Krutaya
- Kruttsy
- Kudrino
- Kulaki
- Kuzmino
- Lekhtovo
- Levenda
- Levino
- Luzhi
- Luzhki
- Lyakhi
- Maly Priklon
- Maly Sanchur
- Maximovka
- Maximovo
- Milna
- Muralyovo
- Muratovo
- Novenkaya
- Novo-Barsukovo
- Novonikolayevskoye
- Okshovo
- Orlovka
- Osinki
- Ozornovo
- Panovo
- Panovsky
- Papulino
- Pichugino
- Priklon
- Prosenitsy
- Prudnya
- Ramen
- Ratnovo
- Repino
- Rozhdestveno
- Savkovo
- Selino
- Shokhino
- Sinzhany
- Skripino
- Slavtsevo
- Sofronovo
- Sokolye
- Sovetsky
- Starinki
- Stepankovo
- Timoshino
- Tolstikovo
- Turgenevo
- Ulanovka
- Urvanovo
- Uryusevo
- Usad
- Vasilyevsky
- Venedeyevka
- Verkhounzha
- Verkhozerye
- Vichkino
- Vologdino
- Voynovo
- Voyutino
- Vypolzovo
- Vysokovo
- Yelino
- Yuzhny
- Zimnitsy
- Zlobino

== Murom urban okrug ==
Rural localities in Murom urban okrug:

- Fabriki im. P. L. Voykova
- Orlovo
- Yakimanskaya Sloboda

== Muromsky District ==
Rural localities in Muromsky District:

- Afanasovo
- Aleshunino
- Alexandrovka
- Baburino
- Berdishchevo
- Berezovka
- Bezlesnaya
- Blagoveshchenskoye
- Bolshoye Yuryevo
- Borisogleb
- Borisovo
- Borok
- Borovitsy
- Bulatnikovo
- Chaadayevo
- Cheremisino
- Dmitriyevka
- Dmitriyevskaya Sloboda
- Dyakonovo
- Fedorkovo
- Glebovka
- Gribkovo
- Ignatyevo
- Ivankovo
- Katyshevo
- Khorobritsy
- Klimovo
- Koldino
- Kommuna
- Kondrakovo
- Korzhavino
- Kovarditsy
- Krasny Bor
- Krivitsy
- Lazarevo
- Lesnikovo
- Makarovka
- Maloye Yuryevo
- Martynovo
- Mezhishchi
- Mikhalchugovo
- Mikhalevo
- Mikhaylovka
- Mikhaylovo
- Mishino
- Molotitsy
- Mordvinovo
- Muromsky
- Nezhilovka
- Novoye Ratovo
- Novye Kotlitsy
- Nula
- Okheyevo
- Okulovo
- Olgino
- Ozhigovo
- Penza
- Pestenkino
- Petrokovo
- Poleskovo
- Poltso
- Popolutovo
- Posyolok Mekhanizatorov
- Probuzhdeniye
- Prudishchi
- Ramezhki
- Rozhnovo
- Safonovo
- Saksino
- Sannikovo
- Savanchakovo
- Savkovo
- Shishlovo
- Sobolevo
- Sosnitsy
- Staroye Ratovo
- Starye Kotlitsy
- Stepankovo
- Strigino
- Talyzino
- Tatarovo
- Valovo
- Varezh
- Volnino
- Zagryazhskoye
- Zakharovo
- Zaroslovo
- Zhemchuzhino
- Zimyonki

== Petushinsky District ==
Rural localities in Petushinsky District:

- Abbakumovo
- Abrosovo
- Aksenovo
- Alexino
- Andreyevskoye
- Aniskino
- Ankudinovo
- Antushovo
- Barskovo
- Beryozka
- Bliznetsy
- Bogdarnya
- Boldino
- Boldino
- Bolshiye Gorki
- Borok
- Chashcha
- Cherkasovo
- Chupriyanovo
- Denisovo
- Domashnevo
- Dubrovka
- Filimonovo
- Glubokovo
- Gnezdino
- Golovino
- Gora
- Gorushka
- Gospodinovo
- Gribovo
- Ilyinki
- Ivanovo
- Kalinino
- Karavayevo
- Kibiryovo
- Kirzhach
- Klyazmensky
- Kobyaki
- Kolobrodovo
- Kostino
- Krasny Luch
- Krutovo
- Kryuki
- Kukushkino
- Kuzyayevo
- Lakibrovo
- Larionovo
- Leonovo
- Letovo
- Lipna
- Logintsevo
- Lugovoy
- Malye Gorki
- Markovo
- Markovo
- Marochkovo
- Mashinostroitel
- Maslyanye Gorochki
- Metenino
- Mikheytsevo
- Molodilovo
- Molodino
- Myachikovo
- Myshlino
- Nagorny
- Naputnovo
- Nazarovo
- Nerazh
- Norkino
- Novinki
- Novoye Annino
- Novy Spas
- Novye Omutishchi
- Ostrovishchi
- Ovchinino
- Pakhomovo
- Panfilovo
- Pavlovo
- Peksha
- Pernovo
- Plotavtsevo
- Podvyaznovo
- Pokrovskogo lesouchastka
- Polomy
- Popinovo
- Posyolok Pokrovskogo torfouchastka
- Repikhovo
- Rodionovo
- Roshchino
- Rozhdestvo
- Rusanovo
- Sanino
- Saninskogo DOKa
- Shibotovo
- Sitnikovo
- Sosnovy Bor
- Stanovtsovo
- Staroye Annino
- Staroye Perepechino
- Staroye Seltso
- Staroye Semyonkovo
- Staroye Stenino
- Starye Omutishchi
- Starye Petushki
- Stepanovo
- Sukovatovo
- Sushnevo-1
- Sushnevo-2
- Taratino
- Teleshovo
- Trud
- Tsepnino
- Tuykovo
- Vasilki
- Vaultsevo
- Veselovo
- Vetchi
- Volkovo
- Volosovo
- Voronovo
- Voskresenye
- Vospushka
- Vyalovo
- Yefimtsevo
- Yeliseykovo
- Yemelyantsevo
- Yermolino
- Yeskino
- Yevdokimtsevo
- Yuchmer
- Zabolotye
- Zadneye Pole
- Zhary
- Zheltukhino
- Zheludyevo

== Selivanovsky District ==
Rural localities in Selivanovsky District:

- Alyoshkovo
- Andreyevka
- Belkovo
- Bolshoye Grigorovo
- Bolshoye Koltsovo
- Bolshoye Ugryumovo
- Chernovskaya
- Chertkovo
- Delovo
- Denisovo
- Drachyovo
- Dubrovo
- Golovino
- Goritsy
- Gubino
- Gusyok
- Ilyinskoye
- Isakovo
- Ivankovo (Chertkovskoye Rural Settlement)
- Ivankovo (Malyshevskoye Rural Settlement)
- Ivanovskaya
- Ivonino
- Karpovo
- Khvostsovo
- Kochergino
- Kopnino
- Korelkino
- Kostenets
- Krasnaya Gorka
- Krasnaya Ushna
- Kurkovo
- Lobanovo
- Lukoyanikha
- Maloye Grigorovo
- Malyshevo
- Maryevka
- Matveyevka
- Mitrofanovo
- Mityakovo
- Mokrovo
- Nadezhdino
- Nagovitsyno
- Neklyudovo
- Nekrasovo
- Nikolo-Ushna
- Nikulino
- Novlyanka
- Novlyanka (settlement)
- Novoye Bibeyevo
- Novy Byt
- Parshovo
- Pchyolkino
- Perelozhnikovo
- Pervomaysky
- Petrovskoye
- Poshatovo
- Pribrezhnaya
- Sanchugovo
- Savino
- Savkovo
- Selishchi
- Senkovo
- Shiryayevo
- Shulgino
- Skalovo
- Staroye Bibeyevo
- Svyatsy
- Takovikha
- Terenino
- Troitsko-Kolychyovo
- Tuchkovo
- Vikhirevo
- Voshchikha
- Vysokovo
- Yartsevo
- Yekaterinovka
- Yesipovo
- Yuromka
- Zakharovo
- Zarechye
- Zhary
- Znamenka

== Sobinsky District ==
Rural localities in Sobinsky District:

- Afanasyevo
- Alepino
- Anfimikha
- Antsiferovo
- Arbuzovo
- Artyushino
- Aserkhovo
- Astafyevo
- Azikovo
- Babayevo
- Baranniki
- Batyushkovo
- Berezniki
- Bezvodnoye
- Bokovino
- Bolgary
- Bolshiye Ostrova
- Bolshoye Ivankovo
- Bratilovo
- Bratonezh
- Bukholovo
- Bulanovo
- Burykino
- Buzakovo
- Chaganovo
- Cherkutino
- Chizhovo
- Churilovo
- Danilovka
- Demidovo
- Demikhovo
- Dobrynino
- Dubrovka
- Dubrovo
- Fedotovo
- Fedurnovo
- Fetinino
- Filino
- Frolikha
- Fyodorovka
- Glukhovo
- Gnusovo
- Golovino
- Golubino
- Goryamino
- Ivlevo
- Kadyevo
- Kaliteyevo
- Karacharovo
- Karpovo
- Kharitonovo
- Khrenovo
- Khrenovo
- Khryastovo
- Kishleyevo
- Kochukovo
- Kolokolnitsa
- Koloksha
- Koloksha
- Konino
- Konnovo
- Kopnino
- Kopytovo
- Korchagino
- Kornevo
- Korobovo
- Koroyedovo
- Kosmino
- Kostino
- Koverlevo
- Krutoy Ovrag
- Krutoyak
- Kudelino
- Kurilovo
- Kuzmino
- Kuznetsovo
- Kuznetsy
- Lapino
- Levino
- Litovka
- Luchinskoye
- Malakhovo
- Malye Ostrova
- Maximikha
- Meshchyora
- Mikhlino
- Mitrofanikha
- Monakovo
- Mosyagino
- Nazarovo
- Nerozhino
- Nikulino
- Nikulino
- Novosyolovo
- Oderikhino
- Omoforovo
- Orekhovo
- Osovets
- Parfentyevo
- Pasynkovo
- Perebor
- Pesteryugino
- Petrushino
- Piskutino
- Podvyazye
- Pogost
- Pushnino
- Pushnino
- Ratmirovo
- Remni
- Rozhdestveno
- Rukav
- Rybkhoz Vorsha
- Rylovo
- Ryzhkovo
- Semyonovskoye
- Sergeyevo
- Sheldyakovo
- Shepeli
- Shunovo
- Shuvalikha
- Spasskoye
- Spasskoye
- Spirino
- Stepanikha
- Stepankovo
- Stolbishchi
- Strukovo
- Sulukovo
- Taratinka
- Teplinovo
- Teterino
- Tolpukhovo
- Tsepelevo
- Turino
- Turovo
- Ugor
- Ugryumikha
- Undolsky
- Ustye
- Uvarovo
- Vaganovo
- Val
- Vasilyevka
- Vasilyovo
- Vezhbolovo
- Vishnyakovo
- Volosovo
- Vorsha
- Voshilovo
- Vyshmanovo
- Yagodnoye
- Yakovlevo
- Yelkhovitsa
- Yelkhovka
- Yeltesunovo
- Yermonino
- Yerosovo
- Yurino
- Yurino
- Yurovo
- Zaprudye
- Zarechnoye
- Zhabino
- Zherekhovo
- Zhokhovo
- Zubovo

== Sudogodsky District ==
Rural localities in Sudogodsky District:

- Afonino
- Aksenovo
- Alexandrovo
- Alfyorovo
- Alfyorovo
- Andreyevo
- Avdotyino
- Bakhtino
- Baraki
- Barkino
- Bashevo
- Baygushi
- Beg
- Berezhki
- Bogdantsevo
- Bokusha
- Bolotsky
- Bolshaya Kozlovka
- Borisogleb
- Brykino
- Brykino
- Burlygino
- Bykovo
- Chamerevo
- Cherepovo
- Cherepukhino
- Danilovka
- Daniltsevo
- Demukhino
- Dorofeyevo
- Dubenki
- Dvorishnevo
- Fryazino
- Gladyshevo
- Golovino
- Gonobilovo
- Gorki
- Goryachevo
- Gridino
- Ilyino
- Inyutino
- Isakovo
- Kadyevo
- Kamenets
- Karevo
- Karpovo
- Kartmazovo
- Kashmanovo
- Khokhlachi
- Kiselnitsa
- Klimovskaya
- Kliny
- Kolesnya
- Kolychevo
- Komary
- Kondryayevo
- Konyushino
- Kordon Moshokskogo lesnichestva
- Korostelikha
- Korostelyovo
- Koshcheyevo
- Kostino
- Kostrovo
- Krasnaya Gorka
- Krasny Bogatyr
- Kudryavtsevo
- Ladoga
- Lavrovo
- Likino
- Lisavino
- Lobanovo
- Lukhtonovo
- Lukinskogo doma invalidov
- Lukinskoye
- Lunkovo
- Malakhovo
- Malaya Kozlovka
- Maryukhino
- Maslovo
- Medvedtsevo
- Michurino
- Mikhalevo
- Mikhalevo
- Mitino
- Mitkino
- Mitroshino
- Mordasovo
- Moshok
- Mostishchi
- Muromtsevo
- Myzino
- Nagornoye
- Natalyinka
- Nepeytsino
- Nevryuyevo
- Nikitino
- Nizhnyaya Zaninka
- Novaya
- Novo-Petrovo
- Novokarpovka
- Novoye Polkhovo
- Ovsyanikovo
- Ovsyannikovo
- Ovtsyno
- Ozyablitsy
- Panfilovo
- Patrikeyevo
- Pavlovskaya
- Penki
- Peredel
- Peredel
- Pigasovo
- Poddol
- Pogrebishchi
- Polushkino
- Popelyonki
- Posyolok Lnozavoda
- Posyolok imeni Vorovskogo
- Prokunino
- Prokunino
- Proskurinskaya
- Radilovo
- Raguzino
- Rayki
- Razlukino
- Rogovo
- Rychkovo
- Shipilovo
- Shustovo
- Sinitsyno
- Slashchyovo
- Smykovo
- Sokolovo
- Sorokino
- Soyma
- Spas-Beseda
- Spas-Kupalishche
- Stanki
- Starikovo
- Staroye Chubarovo
- Staroye Kubayevo
- Staroye Polkhovo
- Stepachyovo
- Styopanovo
- Sukhovka
- Telesnikovo
- Tikhonovo
- Timeryovo
- Tolstovo
- Torzhkovo
- Travinino
- Trofimovka
- Trukhachyovo
- Tsvetkovo
- Turovo
- Ulybyshevo
- Ushakovo
- Vaneyevka
- Vasilyevo
- Verigino
- Verkhnyaya Zaninka
- Volnaya Artyomovka
- Vyatkino
- Vyozhki
- Vysokovo
- Yakushevo
- Yazykovo
- Yefimovskaya
- Zagorye
- Zakharovo
- Zayastrebye
- Zharki
- Zhukovka

== Suzdalsky District ==
Rural localities in Suzdalsky District:

- Abakumlevo
- Alferikha
- Babarino
- Bagrinovo
- Barskoye-Gorodishche
- Baskaki
- Bereznitsy
- Bogolyubka
- Bogolyubovo
- Bogoslovo
- Bolshoye Borisovo
- Borisovskoye
- Borodino
- Brodnitsy
- Brutovo
- Chernizh
- Chirikovo
- Dobrynskoye
- Dorzhevo
- Drovniki
- Filippushi
- Fyodorovskoye
- Gavrilovskoye
- Glebovskoye
- Gnezdilovo
- Goloventsino
- Goritsy
- Gridino
- Grigorevo
- Gubachevo
- Ivanovskoye
- Khotenskoye
- Kibol
- Kideksha
- Kistysh
- Klementyevo
- Koziki
- Krapivye
- Krasnogvardeysky
- Krasnoye Sushchyovo
- Krasnoye
- Kutukovo
- Lemeshki
- Lopatnitsy
- Lyakhovitsy
- Malakhovo
- Malininsky
- Malo-Boriskovo
- Maslenka
- Menchakovo
- Mordysh
- Nikulskoye
- Novaya Derevnya
- Novgorodskoye
- Novoalexandrovo
- Novokamenskoye
- Novosyolka Nerlskaya
- Novosyolka
- Novoye
- Novy
- Obrashchikha
- Olikovo
- Omutskoye
- Oslavskoye
- Ovchukhi
- Pantelikha
- Pavlovskoye
- Pereborovo
- Pesochnoye
- Petrakovo
- Podberezye
- Pogost-Bykovo
- Poretskoye
- Prudy
- Ramenye
- Romanovo
- Sadovy
- Sanino
- Seltso
- Semyonovskoye-Krasnoye
- Semyonovskoye-Sovetskoye
- Seslavskoye
- Skorodumka
- Snovitsy
- Sodyshka
- Sokol
- Spasskoye-Gorodishche
- Stary Dvor
- Subbotino
- Sukhodol
- Suromna
- Sushchyovo
- Suvorotskoye
- Tarbayevo
- Teremets
- Tereneyevo
- Teterino
- Torchino
- Troitsa-Bereg
- Tsibeyevo
- Turovo
- Turtino
- Ulovo
- Vasilkovo
- Velisovo
- Ves
- Viltsovo
- Vishenki
- Vnukovo
- Vorontsovo
- Voskresenskaya Slobodka
- Vypovo
- Vyselki
- Vysheslavskoye
- Yakimanskoye
- Yanovets
- Yanyovo
- Zagorye
- Zapolitsy
- Zeleni

== Sysertsky District ==
Rural localities in Sysertsky District:

- Abramovo

== Vladimir ==
Rural localities in Vladimir urban okrug:

- Abbakumovo
- Bukholovo
- Dolgaya Luzha
- Krasnoye Ekho
- Kusunovo
- Mosino
- Nemtsovo
- Nikulino
- Oborino
- Panfilovo
- Rakhmanov Perevoz
- Shepelevo
- Ushcher
- Vilki
- Zaklyazmensky
- Zlobino

== Vyaznikovsky District ==
Rural localities in Vyaznikovsky District:

- Abrosimovo
- Afanasyevo
- Agafonovo
- Aksenovo
- Alyoshinskaya
- Ananyino
- Artyomkovo
- Babskoye Tatarovo
- Babukhino
- Bakhtolovo
- Belaya Ramen
- Belyaikha
- Bolshevysokovo
- Bolshiye Lipki
- Bolshiye Udoly
- Bolshoy Kholm
- Bolshoye Filisovo
- Bolymotikha
- Borodino
- Borzyn
- Bragino
- Brodniki
- Burino
- Burkovo
- Burtsevo
- Butorlino
- Bykovka
- Chernevo
- Chernomorye
- Chudinovo
- Danilkovo
- Druzhnaya
- Dudkino
- Dyakonovo
- Edon
- Fedorkovo
- Fedoseikha
- Fedurniki
- Fomina Ramen
- Galkino
- Glinishchi
- Glubokovo
- Golovino
- Goremykino
- Gridinskaya
- Igumentsy
- Ilevniki
- Ilyina Gora
- Isakovka
- Isayevo
- Ivankovo
- Ivanovka
- Kalikino
- Kality
- Kamenevo
- Kharino
- Khudyakovo
- Kika
- Kitovo
- Klimovskaya
- Klyuchevo
- Komlevo
- Koptsevo
- Korovintsevo
- Korshunikha
- Kostenevo
- Kourkovo
- Kozlovka
- Kozlovo
- Krutovka
- Krutye
- Krutye Gorki
- Kudryavtsevo
- Kurbatikha
- Kuzmino
- Lapino
- Likhaya Pozhnya
- Lipovskaya Usadba
- Log
- Luknovo
- Malovskaya
- Maloye Vysokovo
- Maly Kholm
- Malye Lipki
- Malye Udoly
- Maryino
- Matyukino
- Medvedevo
- Merkutino
- Miklyayevo
- Mitinskaya
- Mitiny Derevenki
- Mstyora
- Naguyevo
- Naleskino
- Namestovo
- Nevezhino
- Novo
- Novosyolka
- Obednino
- Okatovo
- Okhlopkovo
- Oktyabrskaya
- Oktyabrsky
- Oltushevo
- Osinki
- Palkino
- Palkovo
- Paustovo
- Perovo
- Pervomaysky
- Peski
- Pirovy-Gorodishchi
- Pivovarovo
- Ploskovo
- Ponomaryovo
- Pozdnyakovo
- Prigorevo
- Priozerny
- Ramenye
- Rastovo
- Rogovskaya
- Romashyovo
- Rudelyovo
- Rudilnitsy
- Ryabikha
- Rytovo
- Sankhar
- Saryevo (selo)
- Saryevo (settlement)
- Sedelnikovo
- Selishche
- Seltsovy Derevenki
- Selyankino
- Senino
- Senkovo
- Sergeyevo
- Sergiyevy-Gorki
- Serkovo
- Serkovo
- Shatnevo
- Shchekino
- Shustovo
- Simontsevo
- Singer
- Sinyatkino
- Sizovo
- Skolepovo
- Slobodka
- Sosenki
- Sosnovka
- Stanki
- Starygino
- Stavrovo
- Stepkovo
- Stryapkovo
- Stupiny Derevenki
- Styopantsevo
- Suvoloka
- Suytino
- Sysoyevo
- Tabachikha
- Timino
- Topolyovka
- Torchikha
- Troitskoye-Tatarovo
- Trukhachikha
- Tsentralny
- Usady
- Uspensky Pogost
- Vasilki
- Vorobyevka
- Voronino
- Voynovo
- Vyazovka
- Vysokovo
- Yam
- Yamki
- Yandovy
- Yar
- Yasnye Zori
- Yerofeyevo
- Yuryshki
- Zaborochye
- Zakharovka
- Zarechny
- Zavrazhye
- Zelyonye Prudy
- Zhartsy
- Zhary
- Zhelnino
- Zlobayevo
- Zobishchi
- Zolotaya Griva

== Yuryev-Polsky District ==
Rural localities in Yuryev-Polsky District:

- Afineyevo
- Alexino
- Andreyevskoye (Krasnoselskoye Rural Settlement)
- Andreyevskoye (Nebylovskoye Rural Settlement)
- Avdotyino
- Baskaki
- Belyanitsyno
- Berezniki
- Bildino
- Bogdanovskoye
- Bogdanovsky rybopitomnik
- Bogorodskoye
- Chekovo
- Cherkasovo
- Dergayevo
- Dobrynskoye
- Drozdovo
- Dubrava
- Entuziast
- Fedosyino
- Frolovskoye
- Fyodorovskoye (Nebylovskoye Rural Settlement)
- Fyodorovskoye (Simskoye Rural Settlement)
- Gavriltsevo
- Gorki
- Gorodishche
- Goryainovo
- Grigorovo
- Ilyinskoye
- Ivorovo
- Kalinovka
- Kamenka
- Karabanikha
- Karandyshevo
- Karelskaya Slobodka
- Khoroshovka
- Khvoyny
- Kirpichny Zavod
- Knyazhikha
- Kokorekino
- Kolenovo
- Kolokoltsevo
- Kosagovo
- Kosinskoye
- Kotluchino
- Krasnaya Gorka
- Krasnoye Zarechye
- Krasnoye
- Kubayevo
- Kuchki
- Kumino
- Kuzmadino
- Lednevo (selo)
- Lednevo (station)
- Listvenny
- Lykovo
- Maloluchinskoye
- Markovo
- Matveyshchevo
- Maymor
- Mukino
- Nebyloye
- Nenashevskoye
- Nesterovo
- Nikulskoye
- Novaya
- Novoye
- Opolye
- Ozyorny
- Palazino
- Parkovy
- Parsha
- Pavlovskoye
- Peremilovo
- Podlesny
- Podolets
- Poyelovo
- Prechistaya Gora
- Prigorodny
- Radovanye
- Ratislovo
- Rucheyki
- Ryabinki
- Semyinskoye
- Shadrino
- Shegodskaya
- Shikhobalovo
- Shipilovo
- Sima
- Simizino
- Soroguzhino
- Sosnovy Bor
- Spasskoye
- Starkovo (station)
- Starnikovo
- Svaino
- Tartyshevo
- Tereshki
- Tursino
- Turygino
- Varvarino
- Vasilyevka
- Volstvinovo
- Voskresenskoye
- Vyoska
- Vypolzovo
- Yelokh
- Yeltsy
- Yurkovo
- Zaborye
- Zhelezovo
- Zventsovo

== See also ==
- Lists of rural localities in Russia
