= Usady =

Usady Усады
- Village
- Location within Vladimir Oblast Location within Russia
- Coordinates: 56°02′N 41°48′E
- Country: Russia
- Region: Vladimir Oblast
- District: Vyaznikovsky District
- Time zone: UTC+3:00

Usady (Russian: Усады) is a rural locality (a village) in Styopantsevskoye Rural Settlement, Vyaznikovsky District, Vladimir Oblast, Russia. The population was 195 as of 2010. There is 1 street.

== Geography ==
Usady is located 50 km southwest of Vyazniki (the district's administrative centre) by road. Butorlino is the nearest rural locality.
