= Malye Udoly =

Malye Udoly Малые Удолы
- Village
- Location within Vladimir Oblast Location within Russia
- Coordinates: 56°16′N 42°14′E
- Country: Russia
- Region: Vladimir Oblast
- District: Vyaznikovsky District
- Time zone: UTC+3:00

Malye Udoly (Russian: Малые Удолы) is a rural locality (a village) in Gorod Vyazniki, Vyaznikovsky District, Vladimir Oblast, Russia. The population was 72 as of 2010.

== Geography ==
Malye Udoly is located on the Istok River, 11 km northeast of Vyazniki (the district's administrative centre) by road. Bolshiye Udoly is the nearest rural locality.
