= Fomina Ramen =

Fomina Ramen Фомина Рамень
- Village
- Location within Vladimir Oblast Location within Russia
- Coordinates: 56°01′N 41°48′E
- Country: Russia
- Region: Vladimir Oblast
- District: Vyaznikovsky District
- Time zone: UTC+3:00

Fomina Ramen (Russian: Фомина Рамень) is a rural locality (a village) in Styopantsevskoye Rural Settlement, Vyaznikovsky District, Vladimir Oblast, Russia. The population was 19 as of 2010.

== Geography ==
Fomina Ramen is located 52 km southwest of Vyazniki (the district's administrative centre) by road. Usady is the nearest rural locality.
