= Bolshoy Kholm =

Bolshoy Kholm Большой Холм
- Village
- Location within Vladimir Oblast Location within Russia
- Coordinates: 56°12′N 42°00′E
- Country: Russia
- Region: Vladimir Oblast
- District: Vyaznikovsky District
- Time zone: UTC+3:00

Bolshoy Kholm (Russian: Большой Холм) is a rural locality (a village) in Oktyabrskoye Rural Settlement, Vyaznikovsky District, Vladimir Oblast, Russia. The population was 64 as of 2010.

== Geography ==
Bolshoy Kholm is located 12 km west of Vyazniki (the district's administrative centre) by road. Igumentsevo is the nearest rural locality.
