= Zhartsy =

Zhartsy Жарцы
- Village
- Location within Vladimir Oblast Location within Russia
- Coordinates: 56°11′N 41°54′E
- Country: Russia
- Region: Vladimir Oblast
- District: Vyaznikovsky District
- Time zone: UTC+3:00

Zhartsy (Russian: Жарцы) is a rural locality (a village) in Oktyabrskoye Rural Settlement, Vyaznikovsky District, Vladimir Oblast, Russia. The population was 19 as of 2010.

== Geography ==
Zhartsy is located 21 km southwest of Vyazniki (the district's administrative centre) by road. Agafonovo is the nearest rural locality.
