= Zaborochye =

Zaborochye Заборочье
- Village
- Location within Vladimir Oblast Location within Russia
- Coordinates: 56°17′N 42°12′E
- Country: Russia
- Region: Vladimir Oblast
- District: Vyaznikovsky District
- Time zone: UTC+3:00

Zaborochye (Russian: Заборочье) is a rural locality (a village) in Gorod Vyazniki, Vyaznikovsky District, Vladimir Oblast, Russia. The population was 39 as of 2010.

== Geography ==
Zaborochye is located on the Istok River, 8 km north of Vyazniki (the district's administrative centre) by road. Artemkovo is the nearest rural locality.
