= Styopantsevo =

Styopantsevo Стёпанцево
- Settlement
- Location within Vladimir Oblast Location within Russia
- Coordinates: 56°07′N 41°42′E
- Country: Russia
- Region: Vladimir Oblast
- District: Vyaznikovsky District
- Time zone: UTC+3:00

Styopantsevo (Russian: Стёпанцево) is a rural locality (a settlement) and the administrative center of Styopantsevskoye Rural Settlement, Vyaznikovsky District, Vladimir Oblast, Russia. The population was 2,221 as of 2010. There are 33 streets.

== Geography ==
Styopantsevo is located 36 km southwest of Vyazniki (the district's administrative centre) by road. Korovintsevo is the nearest rural locality.
