= Bakhtolovo =

Bakhtolovo Бахтолово
- Village
- Location within Vladimir Oblast Location within Russia
- Coordinates: 56°00′N 42°05′E
- Country: Russia
- Region: Vladimir Oblast
- District: Vyaznikovsky District
- Time zone: UTC+3:00

Bakhtolovo (Russian: Бахтолово) is a rural locality (a village) in Paustovskoye Rural Settlement, Vyaznikovsky District, Vladimir Oblast, Russia. The population was 8 as of 2010.

== Geography ==
Bakhtolovo is located on the Indrus River, 36 km south of Vyazniki (the district's administrative centre) by road. Prigorevo is the nearest rural locality.
