= Skolepovo =

Skolepovo Сколепово
- Village
- Location within Vladimir Oblast Location within Russia
- Coordinates: 56°14′N 41°53′E
- Country: Russia
- Region: Vladimir Oblast
- District: Vyaznikovsky District
- Time zone: UTC+3:00

Skolepovo (Russian: Сколепово) is a rural locality (a village) in Mstyora Urban Settlement, Vyaznikovsky District, Vladimir Oblast, Russia. The population was 23 as of 2010.

== Geography ==
Skolepovo is located 22 km west of Vyazniki (the district's administrative centre) by road. Vyazovka is the nearest rural locality.
