= Zelyonye Prudy, Vladimir Oblast =

Zelyonye Prudy Зелёные Пруды
- Village
- Location within Vladimir Oblast Location within Russia
- Coordinates: 56°03′N 41°46′E
- Country: Russia
- Region: Vladimir Oblast
- District: Vyaznikovsky District
- Time zone: UTC+3:00

Zelyonye Prudy (Russian: Зелёные Пруды) is a rural locality (a village) in Styopantsevskoye Rural Settlement, Vyaznikovsky District, Vladimir Oblast, Russia. The population was 14 as of 2010.

== Geography ==
The village is located on the Vazhel River, 10 km south from Styopantsevo, 41 km south-west from Vyazniki.
