= Artyomkovo =

Artyomkovo Артёмково
- Village
- Location within Vladimir Oblast Location within Russia
- Coordinates: 56°17′N 42°12′E
- Country: Russia
- Region: Vladimir Oblast
- District: Vyaznikovsky District
- Time zone: UTC+3:00

Artyomkovo (Russian: Артёмково) is a rural locality (a village) in Gorod Vyazniki, Vyaznikovsky District, Vladimir Oblast, Russia. The population was 15 as of 2010.

== Geography ==
Artyomkovo is located on the Istok River, 8 km north of Vyazniki (the district's administrative centre) by road. Zaborochye is the nearest rural locality.
