= Serkovo (Styopanetsevskoye Rural Settlement), Vyaznikovsky District, Vladimir Oblast =

Serkovo Серково
- Village
- Location within Vladimir Oblast Location within Russia
- Coordinates: 56°03′N 41°47′E
- Country: Russia
- Region: Vladimir Oblast
- District: Vyaznikovsky District
- Time zone: UTC+3:00

Serkovo (Russian: Серково) is a rural locality (a village) in Styopantsevskoye Rural Settlement, Vyaznikovsky District, Vladimir Oblast, Russia. The population was 22 as of 2010.

== Geography ==
The village is located 10 km south-east from Styopantsevo, 34 km south-west from Vyazniki.
