= Malye Lipki =

Malye Lipki Малые Липки
- Village
- Location within Vladimir Oblast Location within Russia
- Coordinates: 56°15′N 42°03′E
- Country: Russia
- Region: Vladimir Oblast
- District: Vyaznikovsky District
- Time zone: UTC+3:00

Malye Lipki (Russian: Малые Липки) is a rural locality (a village) in Gorod Vyazniki, Vyaznikovsky District, Vladimir Oblast, Russia. The population was 144 as of 2010. There are 3 streets.

== Geography ==
Malye Lipki is located 8 km northwest of Vyazniki (the district's administrative centre) by road. Bolshiye Lipki is the nearest rural locality.
