= Sizovo, Vyaznikovsky District, Vladimir Oblast =

Sizovo Сизово
- Village
- Location within Vladimir Oblast Location within Russia
- Coordinates: 56°12′N 41°58′E
- Country: Russia
- Region: Vladimir Oblast
- District: Vyaznikovsky District
- Time zone: UTC+3:00

Sizovo (Russian: Сизово) is a rural locality (a village) in Oktyabrskoye Rural Settlement, Vyaznikovsky District, Vladimir Oblast, Russia. The population was 3 as of 2010.

== Geography ==
Sizovo is located 14 km southwest of Vyazniki (the district's administrative centre) by road. Bolshoy Kholm is the nearest rural locality.
