= Stepkovo, Vyaznikovsky District, Vladimir Oblast =

Stepkovo Степково
- Village
- Location within Vladimir Oblast Location within Russia
- Coordinates: 56°08′N 42°01′E
- Country: Russia
- Region: Vladimir Oblast
- District: Vyaznikovsky District
- Time zone: UTC+3:00

Stepkovo (Russian: Степково) is a rural locality (a village) in Posyolok Nikologory, Vyaznikovsky District, Vladimir Oblast, Russia. The population was 17 as of 2010.

== Geography ==
Stepkovo is located 23 km southwest of Vyazniki (the district's administrative centre) by road. Yerofeyevo is the nearest rural locality.
