= Namestovo, Vladimir Oblast =

Namestovo Наместово
- Village
- Location within Vladimir Oblast Location within Russia
- Coordinates: 56°09′N 42°04′E
- Country: Russia
- Region: Vladimir Oblast
- District: Vyaznikovsky District
- Time zone: UTC+3:00

Namestovo (Russian: Наместово) is a rural locality (a village) in Oktyabrskoye Rural Settlement, Vyaznikovsky District, Vladimir Oblast, Russia. The population was 13 as of 2010.

== Geography ==
Namestovo is located 19 km southwest of Vyazniki (the district's administrative centre) by road. Vaskino is the nearest rural locality.
