= Kudryavtsevo =

Kudryavtsevo Кудрявцево
- Village
- Location within Vladimir Oblast Location within Russia
- Coordinates: 56°12′N 42°22′E
- Country: Russia
- Region: Vladimir Oblast
- District: Vyaznikovsky District
- Time zone: UTC+3:00

Kudryavtsevo (Russian: Кудрявцево) is a rural locality (a village) in Gorod Vyazniki, Vyaznikovsky District, Vladimir Oblast, Russia. The population was 39 as of 2010.

== Geography ==
Kudryavtsevo is located 16 km east of Vyazniki (the district's administrative centre) by road. Perovo is the nearest rural locality.
