= Shustovo =

Shustovo Шустово
- Village
- Location within Vladimir Oblast Location within Russia
- Coordinates: 56°20′N 41°44′E
- Country: Russia
- Region: Vladimir Oblast
- District: Vyaznikovsky District
- Time zone: UTC+3:00

Shustovo (Russian: Шустово) is a rural locality (a village) in Saryevskoye Rural Settlement, Vyaznikovsky District, Vladimir Oblast, Russia. The population was 214 as of 2010. There are 4 streets.

== Geography ==
Shustovo is located 40 km northwest of Vyazniki (the district's administrative centre) by road. Okhlopkovo is the nearest rural locality.
