= Oltushevo =

Oltushevo Олтушево
- Village
- Location within Vladimir Oblast Location within Russia
- Coordinates: 56°13′N 42°23′E
- Country: Russia
- Region: Vladimir Oblast
- District: Vyaznikovsky District
- Time zone: UTC+3:00

Oltushevo (Russian: Олтушево) is a rural locality (a village) in Gorod Vyazniki, Vyaznikovsky District, Vladimir Oblast, Russia. The population was 65 as of 2010. There is 1 street.

== Geography ==
Oltushevo is located on the right bank of the Klyazma River, 17 km east of Vyazniki (the district's administrative centre) by road. Zavrazhye is the nearest rural locality.
