= Yasnye Zori, Vladimir Oblast =

Yasnye Zori Ясные Зори
- Village
- Location within Vladimir Oblast Location within Russia
- Coordinates: 56°05′N 41°38′E
- Country: Russia
- Region: Vladimir Oblast
- District: Vyaznikovsky District
- Time zone: UTC+3:00

Yasnye Zori (Russian: Ясные Зори) is a rural locality (a village) in Styopantsevskoye Rural Settlement, Vyaznikovsky District, Vladimir Oblast, Russia. The population was 3 as of 2010.

== Geography ==
Yasnye Zori is located on the Vazhel River, 39 km southwest of Vyazniki (the district's administrative centre) by road. Burtsevo is the nearest rural locality.
