= Ploskovo =

Ploskovo Плосково
- Village
- Location within Vladimir Oblast Location within Russia
- Coordinates: 56°16′N 41°58′E
- Country: Russia
- Region: Vladimir Oblast
- District: Vyaznikovsky District
- Time zone: UTC+3:00

Ploskovo (Russian: Плосково) is a rural locality (a village) in Mstyora Urban Settlement, Vyaznikovsky District, Vladimir Oblast, Russia. The population was 4 as of 2010. There are no streets with titles.

== Geography ==
Ploskovo is located 15 km northwest of Vyazniki (the district's administrative centre) by road. Stanki is the nearest rural locality.
