= Belyaikha =

Belyaikha Беляиха
- Village
- Location within Vladimir Oblast Location within Russia
- Coordinates: 56°12′N 41°54′E
- Country: Russia
- Region: Vladimir Oblast
- District: Vyaznikovsky District
- Time zone: UTC+3:00

Belyaikha (Russian: Беляиха) is a rural locality (a village) in Oktyabrskoye Rural Settlement, Vyaznikovsky District, Vladimir Oblast, Russia. The population was 7 as of 2010.

== Geography ==
Belyaikha is located 21 km southwest of Vyazniki (the district's administrative centre) by road. Zhartsy is the nearest rural locality.
