= Yuryshki =

Yuryshki Юрышки
- Village
- Location within Vladimir Oblast Location within Russia
- Coordinates: 56°19′N 41°42′E
- Country: Russia
- Region: Vladimir Oblast
- District: Vyaznikovsky District
- Time zone: UTC+3:00

Yuryshki (Russian: Юрышки) is a rural locality (a village) in Saryevskoye Rural Settlement, Vyaznikovsky District, Vladimir Oblast, Russia. The population was 24 as of 2010.

== Geography ==
Yuryshki is located on the Tara River, 37 km northwest of Vyazniki (the district's administrative center), by road. Osinki is the nearest rural locality.
