= Ananyino, Vladimir Oblast =

Ananyino Ананьино
- Village
- Location within Vladimir Oblast Location within Russia
- Coordinates: 55°59′N 42°08′E
- Country: Russia
- Region: Vladimir Oblast
- District: Vyaznikovsky District
- Time zone: UTC+3:00

Ananyino (Russian: Ананьино) is a rural locality (a village) in the Paustovskoye Rural Settlement of Vyaznikovsky District, Vladimir Oblast, Russia. As of the 2010 census, its population was 4.

== Geography ==
Ananyino is located on the Indrus River, 38 km south of Vyazniki (the district's administrative centre) by road. Zlobayevo is the nearest rural locality.
