= Kostenevo =

Kostenevo Костенево
- Village
- Location within Vladimir Oblast Location within Russia
- Coordinates: 56°16′N 42°01′E
- Country: Russia
- Region: Vladimir Oblast
- District: Vyaznikovsky District
- Time zone: UTC+3:00

Kostenevo (Russian: Костенево) is a rural locality (a village) in Mstyora Urban Settlement, Vyaznikovsky District, Vladimir Oblast, Russia. The population was 8 as of 2010.

== Geography ==
Kostenevo is located 17 km northwest of Vyazniki (the district's administrative centre) by road. Yandovy is the nearest rural locality.
