= Topolyovka =

Topolyovka Тополёвка
- Village
- Location within Vladimir Oblast Location within Russia
- Coordinates: 56°10′N 42°16′E
- Country: Russia
- Region: Vladimir Oblast
- District: Vyaznikovsky District
- Time zone: UTC+3:00

Topolyovka (Russian: Тополёвка) is a rural locality (a village) in Gorod Vyazniki, Vyaznikovsky District, Vladimir Oblast, Russia. The population was 4 as of 2010.

== Geography ==
Topolyovka is located 18 km southeast of Vyazniki (the district's administrative centre) by road. Mishurovo is the nearest rural locality.
