= Kalikino =

Kalikino Каликино
- Village
- Location within Vladimir Oblast Location within Russia
- Coordinates: 56°12′N 42°04′E
- Country: Russia
- Region: Vladimir Oblast
- District: Vyaznikovsky District
- Time zone: UTC+3:00

Kalikino (Russian: Каликино) is a rural locality (a village) in Oktyabrskoye Rural Settlement, Vyaznikovsky District, Vladimir Oblast, Russia. The population was 4 as of 2010.

== Geography ==
Kalikino is located 12 km west of Vyazniki (the district's administrative centre) by road. Oktyabrsky is the nearest rural locality.
