= Suvoloka =

Suvoloka Суволока
- Village
- Location within Vladimir Oblast Location within Russia
- Coordinates: 56°04′N 41°58′E
- Country: Russia
- Region: Vladimir Oblast
- District: Vyaznikovsky District
- Time zone: UTC+3:00

Suvoloka (Russian: Суволока) is a rural locality (a village) in Posyolok Nikologory, Vyaznikovsky District, Vladimir Oblast, Russia. The population was 12 as of 2010.

== Geography ==
Suvoloka is located 28 km southwest of Vyazniki (the district's administrative centre) by road. Zhelnino is the nearest rural locality.
