= Khudyakovo =

Khudyakovo Худяково
- Village
- Location within Vladimir Oblast Location within Russia
- Coordinates: 56°04′N 41°46′E
- Country: Russia
- Region: Vladimir Oblast
- District: Vyaznikovsky District
- Time zone: UTC+3:00

Khudyakovo (Russian: Худяково) is a rural locality (a village) in Styopantsevskoye Rural Settlement, Vyaznikovsky District, Vladimir Oblast, Russia. The population was 6 as of 2010.

== Geography ==
Khudyakovo is located 44 km southwest of Vyazniki (the district's administrative centre) by road. Kitovo is the nearest rural locality.
