= Lapino, Vyaznikovsky District, Vladimir Oblast =

Village in Russia

Lapino Лапино
- Village
- Location within Vladimir Oblast Location within Russia
- Coordinates: 56°14′N 42°13′E
- Country: Russia
- Region: Vladimir Oblast
- District: Vyaznikovsky District
- Time zone: UTC+3:00

Lapino (Russian: Лапино) is a rural locality (a village) in Gorod Vyazniki, Vyaznikovsky District, Vladimir Oblast, Russia. The population was 65 as of 2010. There are two streets.

== Geography ==
Lapino is located on the Klyazma River, 6 km (4 mi) east of Vyazniki (the district's administrative centre) by road. Pirovy-Gorodishchi is the nearest rural locality.
