= Naleskino =

Naleskino Налескино
- Village
- Location within Vladimir Oblast Location within Russia
- Coordinates: 56°19′N 41°57′E
- Country: Russia
- Region: Vladimir Oblast
- District: Vyaznikovsky District
- Time zone: UTC+3:00

Naleskino (Russian: Налескино) is a rural locality (a village) in Mstyora Urban Settlement, Vyaznikovsky District, Vladimir Oblast, Russia. The population was 34 as of 2010.

== Geography ==
Naleskino is located near the right bank of the Klyazma River, 18 km northwest of Vyazniki (the district's administrative centre) by road. Timino is the nearest rural locality.
