= Simontsevo =

Simontsevo Симонцево
- Village
- Location within Vladimir Oblast Location within Russia
- Coordinates: 56°13′N 41°47′E
- Country: Russia
- Region: Vladimir Oblast
- District: Vyaznikovsky District
- Time zone: UTC+3:00

Simontsevo (Russian: Симонцево) is a rural locality (a village) in Saryevskoye Rural Settlement, Vyaznikovsky District, Vladimir Oblast, Russia. The population was 138 as of 2010. There are two streets.

== Geography ==
Simontsevo is located 24 km west of Vyazniki (the district's administrative centre) by road. Vyazovka is the nearest rural locality.
