= Shatnevo =

Shatnevo Шатнево
- Village
- Location within Vladimir Oblast Location within Russia
- Coordinates: 56°05′N 41°56′E
- Country: Russia
- Region: Vladimir Oblast
- District: Vyaznikovsky District
- Time zone: UTC+3:00

Shatnevo (Russian: Шатнево) is a rural locality (a village) in Posyolok Nikologory, Vyaznikovsky District, Vladimir Oblast, Russia. The population was 464 as of 2010. There are 10 streets.

== Geography ==
Shatnevo is located 28 km southwest of Vyazniki (the district's administrative centre) by road. Zhelnino is the nearest rural locality.
