= Isayevo, Vladimir Oblast =

Isayevo Исаево
- Village
- Location within Vladimir Oblast Location within Russia
- Coordinates: 56°10′N 42°06′E
- Country: Russia
- Region: Vladimir Oblast
- District: Vyaznikovsky District
- Time zone: UTC+3:00

Isayevo (Russian: Исаево) is a rural locality (a village) in Paustovskoye Rural Settlement, Vyaznikovsky District, Vladimir Oblast, Russia. The population was 4 as of 2010.

== Geography ==
Isayevo is located 15 km south of Vyazniki (the district's administrative centre) by road. Babukhino is the nearest rural locality.
