= Senino =

Senino Сенино
- Village
- Location within Vladimir Oblast Location within Russia
- Coordinates: 56°09′N 41°44′E
- Country: Russia
- Region: Vladimir Oblast
- District: Vyaznikovsky District
- Time zone: UTC+3:00

Senino (Russian: Сенино) is a rural locality (a village) in the Styopantsevskoye Rural Settlement, Vyaznikovsky District, Vladimir Oblast, Russia. As of the 2010 census, the population was 1.

== Geography ==
Senino is located 34 km southwest of Vyazniki (the district's administrative centre) by road. Korovintsevo is the nearest rural locality.
