= Tabachikha =

Tabachikha Табачиха
- Village
- Location within Vladimir Oblast Location within Russia
- Coordinates: 56°06′N 41°45′E
- Country: Russia
- Region: Vladimir Oblast
- District: Vyaznikovsky District
- Time zone: UTC+3:00

Tabachikha (Russian: Табачиха) is a rural locality (a village) in Styopantsevskoye Rural Settlement, Vyaznikovsky District, Vladimir Oblast, Russia. The population was 20 as of 2010.

== Geography ==
Tabachikha is located 42 km southwest of Vyazniki (the district's administrative centre) by road. Edon is the nearest rural locality.
