= Borzyn =

Borzyn Борзынь
- Village
- Location within Vladimir Oblast Location within Russia
- Coordinates: 56°14′N 42°02′E
- Country: Russia
- Region: Vladimir Oblast
- District: Vyaznikovsky District
- Time zone: UTC+3:00

Borzyn (Russian: Борзынь) is a rural locality (a village) in Gorod Vyazniki, Vyaznikovsky District, Vladimir Oblast, Russia. The population was 36 as of 2010.

== Geography ==
Borzyn is located 9 km west of Vyazniki (the district's administrative centre) by road. Chudinovo is the nearest rural locality.
