= Zolotaya Griva =

Zolotaya Griva Золотая Грива
- Village
- Location within Vladimir Oblast Location within Russia
- Coordinates: 56°15′N 42°12′E
- Country: Russia
- Region: Vladimir Oblast
- District: Vyaznikovsky District
- Time zone: UTC+3:00

Zolotaya Griva (Russian: Золотая Грива) is a rural locality (a village) in Gorod Vyazniki, Vyaznikovsky District, Vladimir Oblast, Russia. The population is 2 as of 2010. It is 7 km northeast of Vyazniki (the district's administrative centre) by road. Ivanovka is the nearest rural locality.
