= Matyukino =

Matyukino Матюкино
- Village
- Location within Vladimir Oblast Location within Russia
- Coordinates: 56°07′N 41°52′E
- Country: Russia
- Region: Vladimir Oblast
- District: Vyaznikovsky District
- Time zone: UTC+3:00

Matyukino (Russian: Матюкино) is a rural locality (a village) in Posyolok Nikologory, Vyaznikovsky District, Vladimir Oblast, Russia. The population was 6 as of 2010.

== Geography ==
Matyukino is located 28 km southwest of Vyazniki (the district's administrative centre) by road. Abrosimovo is the nearest rural locality.
