= Babskoye Tatarovo =

Babskoye Tatarovo Барское-Татарово
- Village
- Location within Vladimir Oblast Location within Russia
- Coordinates: 56°23′N 41°54′E
- Country: Russia
- Region: Vladimir Oblast
- District: Vyaznikovsky District
- Time zone: UTC+3:00

Babskoye Tatarovo (Russian: Барское-Татарово) is a rural locality (a village) in Mstyora Urban Settlement, Vyaznikovsky District, Vladimir Oblast, Russia. The population was 1,249 as of 2010. There are 14 streets.

== Geography ==
Babskoye Tatarovo is located on the Mstyorka River, 26 km northwest of Vyazniki (the district's administrative centre) by road. Kozlovka is the nearest rural locality.
