= Pervomaysky, Vyaznikovsky District, Vladimir Oblast =

Pervomaysky Первомайский
- Settlement
- Location within Vladimir Oblast Location within Russia
- Coordinates: 56°14′N 42°06′E
- Country: Russia
- Region: Vladimir Oblast
- District: Vyaznikovsky District
- Time zone: UTC+3:00

Pervomaysky (Russian: Первомайский) is a rural locality (a village) in Vyaznikovsky District, Vladimir Oblast, Russia. The population was 413 as of 2010. There are 2 streets.

== History ==
The village was formed after the Great Patriotic War in connection with the construction of a poultry farm, was part of the Kourovsky village council, since 1986 - part of the Chudinovsky village council, since 2005 - part of the municipality "City of Vyazniki" .

== Geography ==
The village is located 2 km west from Vyazniki.
