= Selyankino =

Selyankino Селянкино
- Village
- Location within Vladimir Oblast Location within Russia
- Coordinates: 56°18′N 41°40′E
- Country: Russia
- Region: Vladimir Oblast
- District: Vyaznikovsky District
- Time zone: UTC+3:00

Selyankino (Russian: Селянкино) is a rural locality (a village) in Saryevskoye Rural Settlement, Vyaznikovsky District, Vladimir Oblast, Russia. The population was 18 as of 2010.

== Geography ==
Selyankino is located 37 km northwest of Vyazniki (the district's administrative centre) by road. Saryeyvo is the nearest rural locality.
