= Troitskoye-Tatarovo =

Troitskoye-Tatarovo Троицкое-Татарово
- Selo
- Location within Vladimir Oblast Location within Russia
- Coordinates: 56°24′N 41°53′E
- Country: Russia
- Region: Vladimir Oblast
- District: Vyaznikovsky District
- Time zone: UTC+3:00

Troitskoye Tatarovo, Vyaznikovsky District, Vladimir Region. Church of the Nativity of the Blessed Virgin Mary

Troitskoye-Tatarovo (Russian: Троицкое-Татарово) is a rural locality (a selo) in Mstyora Urban Settlement, Vyaznikovsky District, Vladimir Oblast, Russia. The population was 38 as of 2010.

== Geography ==
Troitskoye-Tatarovo is located 30 km northwest of Vyazniki (the district's administrative centre) by road. Barskoye Tatarovo is the nearest rural locality.
