= Kurbatikha =

Kurbatikha Курбатиха
- Village
- Location within Vladimir Oblast Location within Russia
- Coordinates: 55°59′N 42°00′E
- Country: Russia
- Region: Vladimir Oblast
- District: Vyaznikovsky District
- Time zone: UTC+3:00

Kurbatikha (Russian: Курбатиха) is a rural locality (a village) in Paustovskoye Rural Settlement, Vyaznikovsky District, Vladimir Oblast, Russia. The population was 27 as of 2010.

== Geography ==
Kurbatikha is located on the Motra River, 43 km southwest of Vyazniki (the district's administrative centre) by road. Aleshkovo is the nearest rural locality.
