= Kality, Vladimir Oblast =

Kality Калиты
- Village
- Location within Vladimir Oblast Location within Russia
- Coordinates: 56°18′N 41°57′E
- Country: Russia
- Region: Vladimir Oblast
- District: Vyaznikovsky District
- Time zone: UTC+3:00

Kality (Russian: Калиты) is a rural locality (a village) in Mstyora Urban Settlement, Vyaznikovsky District, Vladimir Oblast, Russia. The population was 1 as of 2010.

== Geography ==
Kality is located 19 km northwest of Vyazniki (the district's administrative centre) by road. Timino is the nearest rural locality.
