= Stavrovo, Vyaznikovsky District, Vladimir Oblast =

Stavrovo Ставрово
- Village
- Location within Vladimir Oblast Location within Russia
- Coordinates: 56°18′N 41°58′E
- Country: Russia
- Region: Vladimir Oblast
- District: Vyaznikovsky District
- Time zone: UTC+3:00

Stavrovo (Russian: Ставрово) is a rural locality (a village) in Mstyora Urban Settlement, Vyaznikovsky District, Vladimir Oblast, Russia. The population was 12 as of 2010.

== Geography ==
Stavrovo is located 15 km northwest of Vyazniki (the district's administrative centre) by road. Stanki is the nearest rural locality.
