= Yerofeyevo =

Yerofeyevo Ерофеево
- Village
- Location within Vladimir Oblast Location within Russia
- Coordinates: 56°08′N 42°02′E
- Country: Russia
- Region: Vladimir Oblast
- District: Vyaznikovsky District
- Time zone: UTC+3:00

Yerofeyevo (Russian: Ерофеево) is a rural locality (a village) in Posyolok Nikologory, Vyaznikovsky District, Vladimir Oblast, Russia. The population was 266 as of 2010. There are 4 streets.

== Geography ==
Yerofeyevo is located 24 km southwest of Vyazniki (the district's administrative centre) by road. Stepkovo is the nearest rural locality.
