= Pozdnyakovo =

Pozdnyakovo Поздняково
- Village
- Location within Vladimir Oblast Location within Russia
- Coordinates: 56°11′N 41°49′E
- Country: Russia
- Region: Vladimir Oblast
- District: Vyaznikovsky District
- Time zone: UTC+3:00

Pozdnyakovo (Russian: Поздняково) is a rural locality (a village) in Oktyabrskoye Rural Settlement, Vyaznikovsky District, Vladimir Oblast, Russia. The population was 160 as of 2010.

== Geography ==
Pozdnyakovo is located 30 km (19 mi) west from Vyazniki (the district's administrative centre) by road. Ponomaryovo is the nearest rural locality.
