= Obednino =

Obednino Обеднино
- Village
- Location within Vladimir Oblast Location within Russia
- Coordinates: 56°00′N 42°10′E
- Country: Russia
- Region: Vladimir Oblast
- District: Vyaznikovsky District
- Time zone: UTC+3:00

Obednino (Russian: Обеднино) is a rural locality (a village) in Paustovskoye Rural Settlement, Vyaznikovsky District, Vladimir Oblast, Russia. The population was 9 as of 2010.

== Geography ==
Obednino is located on the Indrus River, 42 km south of Vyazniki (the district's administrative centre) by road. Miklyayevo is the nearest rural locality.
