= Stryapkovo =

Stryapkovo Стряпково
- Village
- Location within Vladimir Oblast Location within Russia
- Coordinates: 56°05′N 42°11′E
- Country: Russia
- Region: Vladimir Oblast
- District: Vyaznikovsky District
- Time zone: UTC+3:00

Stryapkovo (Russian: Стряпково) is a rural locality (a village) in Paustovskoye Rural Settlement, Vyaznikovsky District, Vladimir Oblast, Russia. The population was 8 as of 2010.

== Geography ==
Stryapkovo is located 23 km south of Vyazniki (the district's administrative centre) by road. Borodino is the nearest rural locality.
