= Kika, Vyaznikovsky District, Vladimir Oblast =

Kika Кика
- Village
- Location within Vladimir Oblast Location within Russia
- Coordinates: 56°13′N 42°01′E
- Country: Russia
- Region: Vladimir Oblast
- District: Vyaznikovsky District
- Time zone: UTC+3:00

Kika (Russian: Кика) is a rural locality (a village) in Oktyabrskoye Rural Settlement, Vyaznikovsky District, Vladimir Oblast, Russia. The population was 29 as of 2010.

== Geography ==
Kika is located 10 km west of Vyazniki (the district's administrative centre) by road. Senkovo is the nearest rural locality.
