= Naguyevo =

Naguyevo Нагуево
- Village
- Location within Vladimir Oblast Location within Russia
- Coordinates: 56°10′N 42°04′E
- Country: Russia
- Region: Vladimir Oblast
- District: Vyaznikovsky District
- Time zone: UTC+3:00

Naguyevo (Russian: Нагýево) is a rural locality (a village) in Oktyabrskoye Rural Settlement, Vyaznikovsky District, Vladimir Oblast, Russia. The population was 11 as of 2010.

== Geography ==
Naguyevo is located 18 km southwest of Vyazniki (the district's administrative centre) by road. Starygino is the nearest rural locality.
