= Ivankovo, Vyaznikovsky District, Vladimir Oblast =

Ivankovo Иваньково
- Village
- Location within Vladimir Oblast Location within Russia
- Coordinates: 56°06′N 41°58′E
- Country: Russia
- Region: Vladimir Oblast
- District: Vyaznikovsky District
- Time zone: UTC+3:00

Ivankovo (Russian: Иваньково) is a rural locality (a village) in Posyolok Nikologory, Vyaznikovsky District, Vladimir Oblast, Russia. The population was 7 as of 2010.

== Geography ==
Ivankovo is located 25 km southwest of Vyazniki (the district's administrative centre) by road. Zhelnino is the nearest rural locality.
