= Likhaya Pozhnya =

Likhaya Pozhnya Лихая Пожня
- Village
- Location within Vladimir Oblast Location within Russia
- Coordinates: 56°14′N 41°57′E
- Country: Russia
- Region: Vladimir Oblast
- District: Vyaznikovsky District
- Time zone: UTC+3:00

Likhaya Pozhnya (Russian: Лихая Пожня) is a rural locality (a village) in Gorod Vyazniki, Vyaznikovsky District, Vladimir Oblast, Russia. The population was 81 as of 2010. There are 3 streets.

== Geography ==
Likhaya Pozhnya is located on the Suvoroshch River, 15 km west of Vyazniki (the district's administrative centre) by road. Korshunikha is the nearest rural locality.
