= Uspensky Pogost =

Uspensky Pogost Успенский Погост
- Village
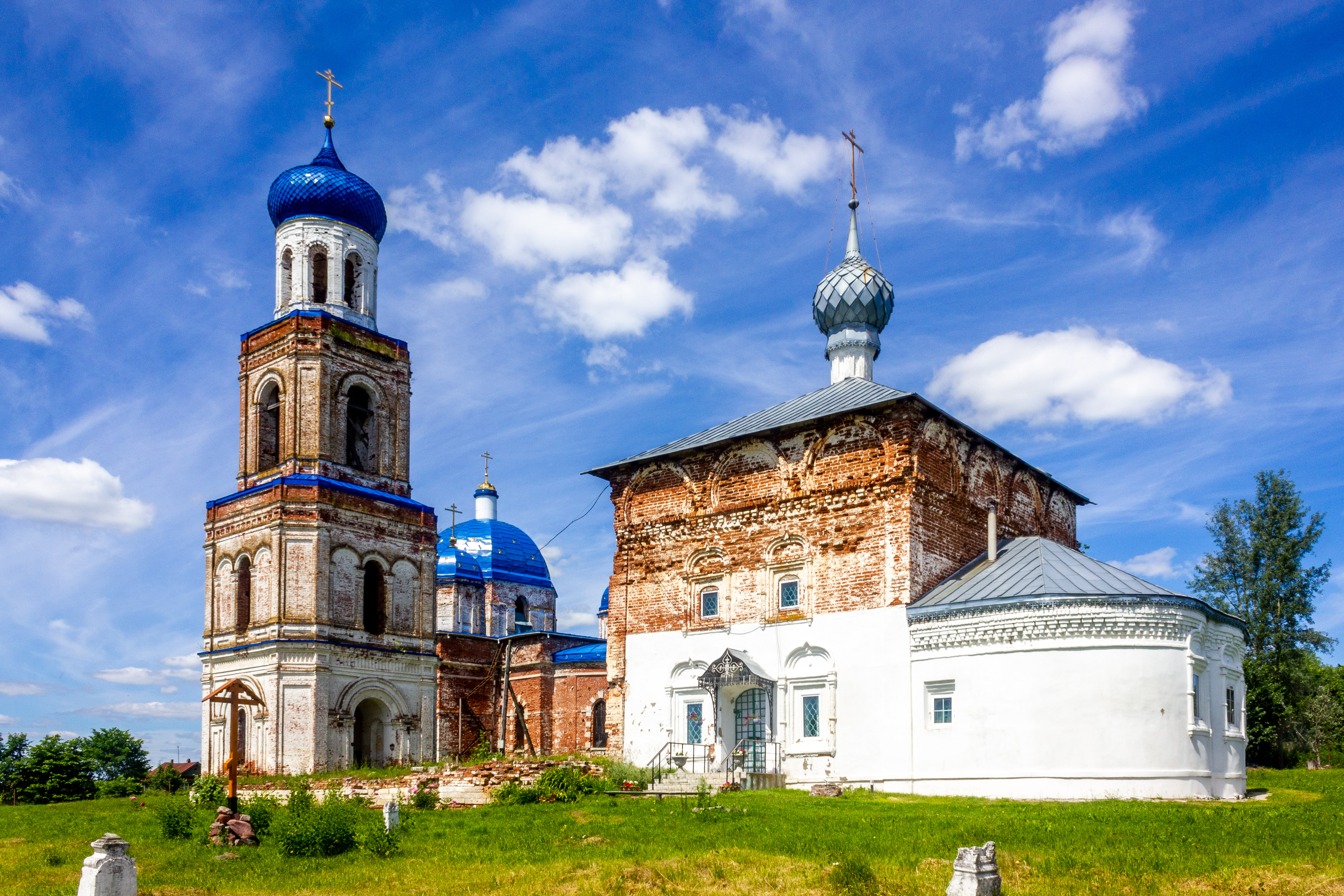
- The Trinity Church and the bell tower

- Location within Vladimir Oblast Location within Russia
- Coordinates: 56°06′N 42°10′E
- Country: Russia
- Region: Vladimir Oblast
- District: Vyaznikovsky District
- Time zone: UTC+3:00

Uspensky Pogost (Russian: Успéнский Погóст) is a rural locality (a village) in Paustovskoye Rural Settlement, Vyaznikovsky District, Vladimir Oblast, Russia. The population was 72 as of 2010.

== Geography ==
Uspensky Pogost is located on the left bank of the Suvoroshch River, 21 km south of Vyazniki (the district's administrative centre) by road. Borodino is the nearest rural locality.
