= Fedoseikha =

Fedoseikha Федосеиха
- Village
- Location within Vladimir Oblast Location within Russia
- Coordinates: 56°20′N 41°57′E
- Country: Russia
- Region: Vladimir Oblast
- District: Vyaznikovsky District
- Time zone: UTC+3:00

Fedoseikha (Russian: Федосеиха) is a rural locality (a village) in Mstyora Urban Settlement, Vyaznikovsky District, Vladimir Oblast, Russia. The population was 13 as of 2010.

== Geography ==
Fedoseikha is located 20 km northwest of Vyazniki (the district's administrative centre) by road. Naleskino is the nearest rural locality.
