= Goremykino =

Goremykino Горемыкино
- Village
- Location within Vladimir Oblast Location within Russia
- Coordinates: 56°13′N 42°21′E
- Country: Russia
- Region: Vladimir Oblast
- District: Vyaznikovsky District
- Time zone: UTC+3:00

Goremykino (Russian: Горемыкино) is a rural locality (a village) in Gorod Vyazniki, Vyaznikovsky District, Vladimir Oblast, Russia. The population was 2 as of 2010.

== Geography ==
Goremykino is located 15 km east of Vyazniki (the district's administrative centre) by road. Voynovo is the nearest rural locality.
