= Saryevo (selo) =

Saryevo Сарыево
- Selo
- Location within Vladimir Oblast Location within Russia
- Coordinates: 56°16′N 41°45′E
- Country: Russia
- Region: Vladimir Oblast
- District: Vyaznikovsky District
- Time zone: UTC+3:00

Saryevo (Russian: Сарыево) is a rural locality (a selo) and the administrative center of Saryevskoye Rural Settlement, Vyaznikovsky District, Vladimir Oblast, Russia. The population was 409 as of 2010. There are 8 streets.

== Geography ==
Saryevo is located 29 km west of Vyazniki (the district's administrative centre) by road. Vysokovo is the nearest rural locality.
