= Burino =

Burino Бурино
- Village
- Location within Vladimir Oblast Location within Russia
- Coordinates: 56°21′N 42°08′E
- Country: Russia
- Region: Vladimir Oblast
- District: Vyaznikovsky District
- Time zone: UTC+3:00

Burino (Russian: Бурино) is a rural locality (a village) in Gorod Vyazniki, Vyaznikovsky District, Vladimir Oblast, Russia. The population was 156 as of 2010.

== Geography ==
Burino is located 17 km north of Vyazniki (the district's administrative centre) by road. Burino (settlement) is the nearest rural locality.
