= Okhlopkovo =

Okhlopkovo Охлопково
- Village
- Location within Vladimir Oblast Location within Russia
- Coordinates: 56°20′N 41°43′E
- Country: Russia
- Region: Vladimir Oblast
- District: Vyaznikovsky District
- Time zone: UTC+3:00

Okhlopkovo (Russian: Охлопково) is a rural locality (a village) in Saryevskoye Rural Settlement, Vyaznikovsky District, Vladimir Oblast, Russia. The population was 21 as of 2010.

== Geography ==
Okhlopkovo is located on the Tara River, 39 km northwest of Vyazniki (the district's administrative centre) by road. Shustovo is the nearest rural locality.
