= Brodniki, Vyaznikovsky District, Vladimir Oblast =

Brodniki Бродники
- Village
- Location within Vladimir Oblast Location within Russia
- Coordinates: 56°13′N 41°58′E
- Country: Russia
- Region: Vladimir Oblast
- District: Vyaznikovsky District
- Time zone: UTC+3:00

Brodniki (Russian: Бродники) is a rural locality (a village) in Oktyabrskoye Rural Settlement, Vyaznikovsky District, Vladimir Oblast, Russia. The population was 10 as of 2010.

== Geography ==
Brodniki is located on the Suvoroshch River, 16 km west of Vyazniki (the district's administrative centre) by road. Korshunikha is the nearest rural locality.
