= Zlobayevo =

Zlobayevo Злобаево
- Village
- Location within Vladimir Oblast Location within Russia
- Coordinates: 55°59′N 42°09′E
- Country: Russia
- Region: Vladimir Oblast
- District: Vyaznikovsky District
- Time zone: UTC+3:00

Zlobayevo (Russian: Злобаево) is a rural locality (a village) in Paustovskoye Rural Settlement, Vyaznikovsky District, Vladimir Oblast, Russia. The population was 51 as of 2010.

== Geography ==
Zlobayevo is located on the Indrus River, 39 km south of Vyazniki (the district's administrative centre) by road. Ananyino is the nearest rural locality.
