= Yandovy =

Yandovy Яндовы
- Village
- Location within Vladimir Oblast Location within Russia
- Coordinates: 56°16′N 41°59′E
- Country: Russia
- Region: Vladimir Oblast
- District: Vyaznikovsky District
- Time zone: UTC+3:00

Yandovy (Russian: Яндовы) is a rural locality (a village) in Mstyora Urban Settlement, Vyaznikovsky District, Vladimir Oblast, Russia. The population was one as of 2010.

== Geography ==
Yandovy is located 16 km northwest of Vyazniki (the district's administrative centre) by road. Kostenevo is the nearest rural locality.
