= Singer, Vladimir Oblast =

Singer Сингерь
- Village
- Location within Vladimir Oblast Location within Russia
- Coordinates: 56°16′N 42°02′E
- Country: Russia
- Region: Vladimir Oblast
- District: Vyaznikovsky District
- Time zone: UTC+3:00

Singer (Russian: Сингерь) is a rural locality (a village) in Mstyora Urban Settlement, Vyaznikovsky District, Vladimir Oblast, Russia. The population was 36 as of 2010.

== Geography ==
Singer is located 10 km northwest of Vyazniki (the district's administrative centre) by road. Malye Lipki is the nearest rural locality.
