= Igumentsy =

Igumentsy Игуменцево
- Village
- Location within Vladimir Oblast Location within Russia
- Coordinates: 56°12′N 42°00′E
- Country: Russia
- Region: Vladimir Oblast
- District: Vyaznikovsky District
- Time zone: UTC+3:00

Igumentsy (Russian: Игуменцево) is a rural locality (a village) in Oktyabrskoye Rural Settlement, Vyaznikovsky District, Vladimir Oblast, Russia. The population was 13 as of 2010.

== Geography ==
Igumentsy is located 14 km west of Vyazniki (the district's administrative centre) by road. Bolshoy Kholm is the nearest rural locality.
