= Lipovskaya Usadba =

Lipovskaya Usadba Липовская Усадьба
- Village
- Location within Vladimir Oblast Location within Russia
- Coordinates: 56°14′N 42°17′E
- Country: Russia
- Region: Vladimir Oblast
- District: Vyaznikovsky District
- Time zone: UTC+3:00

Lipovskaya Usadba (Russian: Липовская Усадьба) is a rural locality (a village) in Gorod Vyazniki, Vyaznikovsky District, Vladimir Oblast, Russia. The population was 5 as of 2010.

== Geography ==
Lipovskaya Usadba is located on the Klyazma River, 11 km east of Vyazniki (the district's administrative centre) by road. Shchekino is the nearest rural locality.
