= Mitinskaya, Vladimir Oblast =

Mitinskaya Митинская
- Village
- Location within Vladimir Oblast Location within Russia
- Coordinates: 56°04′N 42°09′E
- Country: Russia
- Region: Vladimir Oblast
- District: Vyaznikovsky District
- Time zone: UTC+3:00

Mitinskaya (Russian: Митинская) is a rural locality (a village) in Paustovskoye Rural Settlement, Vyaznikovsky District, Vladimir Oblast, Russia. The population was 8 as of 2010.

== Geography ==
Mitinskaya is located 25 km south of Vyazniki (the district's administrative centre) by road. Rogovskaya is the nearest rural locality.
