= Bolshoye Filisovo =

Bolshoye Filisovo Большое Филисово
- Village
- Location within Vladimir Oblast Location within Russia
- Coordinates: 56°03′N 42°04′E
- Country: Russia
- Region: Vladimir Oblast
- District: Vyaznikovsky District
- Time zone: UTC+3:00

Bolshoye Filisovo (Russian: Большое Филисово) is a rural locality (a village) in Paustovskoye Rural Settlement, Vyaznikovsky District, Vladimir Oblast, Russia. The population was 3 as of 2010.

== Geography ==
Bolshoye Filisovo is located 30 km south of Vyazniki (the district's administrative centre) by road. Klimovskaya is the nearest rural locality.
