= Bolshiye Udoly =

Bolshiye Udoly Большие Удолы
- Village
- Location within Vladimir Oblast Location within Russia
- Coordinates: 56°15′N 42°15′E
- Country: Russia
- Region: Vladimir Oblast
- District: Vyaznikovsky District
- Time zone: UTC+3:00

Bolshiye Udoly (Russian: Большие Удолы) is a rural locality (a village) in Gorod Vyazniki, Vyaznikovsky District, Vladimir Oblast, Russia. The population was 28 as of 2010.

== Geography ==
Bolshiye Udoly is located on the Udolskoye Lake, 12 km northeast of Vyazniki (the district's administrative centre) by road. Malye Udoly is the nearest rural locality.
