= Kourkovo =

Kourkovo Коурково
- Village
- Location within Vladimir Oblast Location within Russia
- Coordinates: 56°14′N 41°59′E
- Country: Russia
- Region: Vladimir Oblast
- District: Vyaznikovsky District
- Time zone: UTC+3:00

Kourkovo (Russian: Коурково) is a rural locality (a village) in Gorod Vyazniki, Vyaznikovsky District, Vladimir Oblast, Russia. The population was 142 as of 2010. There are 2 streets.

== Geography ==
Kourkovo is located 12 km west of Vyazniki (the district's administrative centre) by road. Korshunikha is the nearest rural locality.
