= Koptsevo, Vyaznikovsky District, Vladimir Oblast =

Koptsevo Копцево
- Village
- Location within Vladimir Oblast Location within Russia
- Coordinates: 56°07′N 41°54′E
- Country: Russia
- Region: Vladimir Oblast
- District: Vyaznikovsky District
- Time zone: UTC+3:00

Koptsevo (Russian: Копцево) is a rural locality (a village) in Posyolok Nikologory, Vyaznikovsky District, Vladimir Oblast, Russia. The population was 56 as of 2010.

== Geography ==
Koptsevo is located 25 km southwest of Vyazniki (the district's administrative centre) by road. Gridinskaya is the nearest rural locality.
