= Bolshiye Lipki =

Bolshiye Lipki Большие Липки
- Village
- Location within Vladimir Oblast Location within Russia
- Coordinates: 56°15′N 42°04′E
- Country: Russia
- Region: Vladimir Oblast
- District: Vyaznikovsky District
- Time zone: UTC+3:00

Bolshiye Lipki (Russian: Большие Липки) is a rural locality (a village) in Gorod Vyazniki, Vyaznikovsky District, Vladimir Oblast, Russia. The population was 220 as of 2010. There are 2 streets.

== Geography ==
Bolshiye Lipki is located 7 km northwest of Vyazniki (the district's administrative centre) by road. Malye Lipki is the nearest rural locality.
