= Glinishchi =

Glinishchi Глинищи
- Village
- Location within Vladimir Oblast Location within Russia
- Coordinates: 56°08′N 42°15′E
- Country: Russia
- Region: Vladimir Oblast
- District: Vyaznikovsky District
- Time zone: UTC+3:00

Glinishchi (Russian: Глинищи) is a rural locality (a village) in Paustovskoye Rural Settlement, Vyaznikovsky District, Vladimir Oblast, Russia. The population was 72 as of 2010. There are 2 streets.

== Geography ==
Glinishchi is located 25 km southeast of Vyazniki (the district's administrative centre) by road. Kamenevo is the nearest rural locality.
