= Kamenevo =

Kamenevo Каменево
- Village
- Location within Vladimir Oblast Location within Russia
- Coordinates: 56°08′N 42°16′E
- Country: Russia
- Region: Vladimir Oblast
- District: Vyaznikovsky District
- Time zone: UTC+3:00

Kamenevo (Russian: Каменево) is a rural locality (a village) in Paustovskoye Rural Settlement, Vyaznikovsky District, Vladimir Oblast, Russia. The population was 16 as of 2010. There are 2 streets.

== Geography ==
Kamenevo is located 26 km southeast of Vyazniki (the district's administrative centre) by road. Glinishchi is the nearest rural locality.
