= Fedurniki =

Fedurniki Федурники
- Village
- Location within Vladimir Oblast Location within Russia
- Coordinates: 56°13′N 42°14′E
- Country: Russia
- Region: Vladimir Oblast
- District: Vyaznikovsky District
- Time zone: UTC+3:00

Fedurniki (Russian: Федурники) is a western rural locality (a village) in Gorod Vyazniki, Vyaznikovsky District, Vladimir Oblast, Russia. The population was 21 as of 2010.

== Geography ==
Fedurniki is located 6 km southeast of Vyazniki (the district's administrative centre) by road. Pirovy-Gorodishchi is the nearest rural locality.
