= Okatovo =

Okatovo Окатово
- Village
- Location within Vladimir Oblast Location within Russia
- Coordinates: 56°04′N 41°56′E
- Country: Russia
- Region: Vladimir Oblast
- District: Vyaznikovsky District
- Time zone: UTC+3:00

Okatovo (Russian: Окатово) is a rural locality (a village) in Posyolok Nikologory, Vyaznikovsky District, Vladimir Oblast, Russia. The population was 8 as of 2010.

== Geography ==
Okatovo is located 30 km southwest of Vyazniki (the district's administrative centre) by road. Shatnevo is the nearest rural locality.
