= Gridinskaya, Vladimir Oblast =

Gridinskaya Гридинская
- Village
- Location within Vladimir Oblast Location within Russia
- Coordinates: 56°07′N 41°56′E
- Country: Russia
- Region: Vladimir Oblast
- District: Vyaznikovsky District
- Time zone: UTC+3:00

Gridinskaya (Russian: Гридинская) is a rural locality (a village) in Posyolok Nikologory, Vyaznikovsky District, Vladimir Oblast, Russia. The population was 8 as of 2010.

== Geography ==
Gridinskaya is located 26 km southwest of Vyazniki (the district's administrative centre) by road. Malovskaya is the nearest rural locality.
