= Rogovskaya =

Rogovskaya Роговская
- Village
- Location within Vladimir Oblast Location within Russia
- Coordinates: 56°04′N 42°08′E
- Country: Russia
- Region: Vladimir Oblast
- District: Vyaznikovsky District
- Time zone: UTC+3:00

Rogovskaya (Russian: Роговская) is a rural locality (a village) in Paustovskoye Rural Settlement, Vyaznikovsky District, Vladimir Oblast, Russia. The population was 82 as of 2010.

== Geography ==
Rogovskaya is located 26 km south of Vyazniki (the district's administrative centre) by road. Oktyabrskaya is the nearest rural locality.
