= Glubokovo =

Glubokovo Глубоково
- Village
- Location within Vladimir Oblast Location within Russia
- Coordinates: 56°17′N 42°01′E
- Country: Russia
- Region: Vladimir Oblast
- District: Vyaznikovsky District
- Time zone: UTC+3:00

Glubokovo (Russian: Глубоково) is a rural locality (a village) in Mstyora Urban Settlement, Vyaznikovsky District, Vladimir Oblast, Russia. The population was 11 as of 2010.

== Geography ==
Glubokovo is located near the Klyazma River, 13 km northwest of Vyazniki (the district's administrative centre) by road. Stanki is the nearest rural locality.
