= Pirovy-Gorodishchi =

Pirovy-Gorodishchi Пировы-Городищи
- Selo
- Location within Vladimir Oblast Location within Russia
- Coordinates: 56°13′N 42°14′E
- Country: Russia
- Region: Vladimir Oblast
- District: Vyaznikovsky District
- Time zone: UTC+3:00

Pirovy-Gorodishchi (Russian: Пировы-Городищи) is a rural locality (a selo) in Gorod Vyazniki, Vyaznikovsky District, Vladimir Oblast, Russia. The population was 870 as of 2010. There are 9 streets.

== Geography ==
Pirovy-Gorodishchi is located on the right bank of the Klyazma River, 7 km southeast of Vyazniki (the district's administrative centre) by road. Lapino is the nearest rural locality.
