= Klyuchevo, Vladimir Oblast =

Klyuchevo Ключево
- Village
- Location within Vladimir Oblast Location within Russia
- Coordinates: 55°59′N 42°11′E
- Country: Russia
- Region: Vladimir Oblast
- District: Vyaznikovsky District

Population (2010)
  - Total: 7
- Time zone: UTC+3:00

Klyuchevo (Russian: Ключево) is a rural locality (a village) in Paustovskoye Rural Settlement, Vyaznikovsky District, Vladimir Oblast, Russia. The population was 7 as of 2010.

== Geography ==
Klyuchevo is located 41 km (25 mi) south of Vyazniki (the district's administrative centre) by road. Zlobayevo is the nearest rural locality.
