= Maly Kholm =

Maly Kholm Малый Холм
- Village
- Location within Vladimir Oblast Location within Russia
- Coordinates: 56°13′N 42°00′E
- Country: Russia
- Region: Vladimir Oblast
- District: Vyaznikovsky District
- Time zone: UTC+3:00

Maly Kholm (Russian: Малый Холм) is a rural locality (a village) in Oktyabrskoye Rural Settlement, Vyaznikovsky District, Vladimir Oblast, Russia. The population was 8 as of 2010.

== Geography ==
Maly Kholm is located 18 km west of Vyazniki (the district's administrative centre) by road. Proletarsky is the nearest rural locality.
