= Butorlino =

Butorlino Буторлино
- Village
- Location within Vladimir Oblast Location within Russia
- Coordinates: 56°02′N 41°49′E
- Country: Russia
- Region: Vladimir Oblast
- District: Vyaznikovsky District
- Time zone: UTC+3:00

Butorlino (Russian: Буторлино) is a rural locality (a village) in Styopantsevskoye Rural Settlement, Vyaznikovsky District, Vladimir Oblast, Russia. The population was 531 as of 2010. There are 10 streets.

== Geography ==
Butorlino is located on the Tetrukh River, 49 km southwest of Vyazniki (the district's administrative centre) by road. Usady is the nearest rural locality.
