= Voynovo =

Voynovo Войново
- Village
- Location within Vladimir Oblast Location within Russia
- Coordinates: 56°13′N 42°20′E
- Country: Russia
- Region: Vladimir Oblast
- District: Vyaznikovsky District
- Time zone: UTC+3:00

Voynovo (Russian: Войново) is a rural locality (a village) in Gorod Vyazniki, Vyaznikovsky District, Vladimir Oblast, Russia. The population was 39 as of 2010.

== Geography ==
Voynovo is located on the Klyazma River, 16 km east of Vyazniki (the district's administrative centre) by road. Rudilnitsy is the nearest rural locality.
