= Prigorevo =

Prigorevo Пригорево
- Village
- Location within Vladimir Oblast Location within Russia
- Coordinates: 55°59′N 42°05′E
- Country: Russia
- Region: Vladimir Oblast
- District: Vyaznikovsky District
- Time zone: UTC+3:00

Prigorevo (Russian: Пригорево) is a rural locality (a village) in Paustovskoye Rural Settlement, Vyaznikovsky District, Vladimir Oblast, Russia. The population was 11 as of 2010.

== Geography ==
Prigorevo is located on the Indrus River, 36 km south of Vyazniki (the district's administrative centre) by road. Sergiyevy-Gorki is the nearest rural locality.
