= Yam, Vyaznikovsky District, Vladimir Oblast =

Yam Ям
- Village
- Location within Vladimir Oblast Location within Russia
- Coordinates: 56°05′N 42°04′E
- Country: Russia
- Region: Vladimir Oblast
- District: Vyaznikovsky District
- Time zone: UTC+3:00

Yam (Russian: Ям) is a rural locality (a village) in Posyolok Nikologory, Vyaznikovsky District, Vladimir Oblast, Russia. The population was 17 as of 2010.

== Geography ==
Yam is located 29 km southwest of Vyazniki (the district's administrative centre) by road. Klimovskaya is the nearest rural locality.
