= Seltsovy Derevenki =

Seltsovy Derevenki Сельцовы Деревеньки
- Village
- Location within Vladimir Oblast Location within Russia
- Coordinates: 56°16′N 42°08′E
- Country: Russia
- Region: Vladimir Oblast
- District: Vyaznikovsky District
- Time zone: UTC+3:00

Seltsovy Derevenki (Russian: Сельцовы Деревеньки) is a rural locality (a village) in Gorod Vyazniki, Vyaznikovsky District, Vladimir Oblast, Russia. The population was 33 as of 2010.

== Geography ==
Seltsovy Derevenki is located near the Klyazma River, 7 km north of Vyazniki (the district's administrative centre) by road. Mitiny Derevenki is the nearest rural locality.
