= Romashyovo =

Romashyovo Ромашёво
- Village
- Location within Vladimir Oblast Location within Russia
- Coordinates: 56°06′N 42°13′E
- Country: Russia
- Region: Vladimir Oblast
- District: Vyaznikovsky District
- Time zone: UTC+3:00

Romashyovo (Russian: Ромашёво) is a rural locality (a village) in Paustovskoye Rural Settlement, Vyaznikovsky District, Vladimir Oblast, Russia. The population was 2 as of 2010.

== Geography ==
Romashyovo is located 24 km south of Vyazniki (the district's administrative centre) by road. Zholobovo is the nearest rural locality.
