= Pivovarovo =

Pivovarovo Пивоварово
- Village
- Location within Vladimir Oblast Location within Russia
- Coordinates: 56°10′N 41°56′E
- Country: Russia
- Region: Vladimir Oblast
- District: Vyaznikovsky District
- Time zone: UTC+3:00

Pivovarovo (Russian: Пивоварово) is a rural locality (a village) in Oktyabrskoye Rural Settlement, Vyaznikovsky District, Vladimir Oblast, Russia. The population was 139 as of 2010. There are 2 streets.

== Geography ==
Pivovarovo is located 19 km southwest of Vyazniki (the district's administrative centre) by road. Serkovo is the nearest rural locality.
