= Luknovo =

Luknovo Лукново
- Settlement
- Location within Vladimir Oblast Location within Russia
- Coordinates: 56°10′N 42°02′E
- Country: Russia
- Region: Vladimir Oblast
- District: Vyaznikovsky District
- Time zone: UTC+3:00

Luknovo (Russian: Лукново) is a rural locality (a settlement) in Oktyabrskoye Rural Settlement, Vyaznikovsky District, Vladimir Oblast, Russia. The population was 2,434 as of 2010. There are 24 streets.

== Geography ==
Luknovo is located 15 km southwest of Vyazniki (the district's administrative centre) by road. Starygino is the nearest rural locality.
