= Osinki, Vyaznikovsky District, Vladimir Oblast =

Osinki Осинки
- Village
- Location within Vladimir Oblast Location within Russia
- Coordinates: 56°20′N 41°43′E
- Country: Russia
- Region: Vladimir Oblast
- District: Vyaznikovsky District
- Time zone: UTC+3:00

Osinki (Russian: Осинки) is a rural locality (a village) in Saryevskoye Rural Settlement, Vyaznikovsky District, Vladimir Oblast, Russia. The population was 312 as of 2010. There are 8 streets.

== Geography ==
Osinki is located on the Tara River, 38 km northwest of Vyazniki (the district's administrative centre) by road. Yuryshki is the nearest rural locality.
