= Sergeyevo =

Sergeyevo Сергеево
- Village
- Location within Vladimir Oblast Location within Russia
- Coordinates: 56°11′N 42°08′E
- Country: Russia
- Region: Vladimir Oblast
- District: Vyaznikovsky District
- Time zone: UTC+3:00

Sergeyevo (Russian: Сергеево) is a rural locality (a village) in Paustovskoye Rural Settlement, Vyaznikovsky District, Vladimir Oblast, Russia. The population was 540 as of 2010. There are 7 streets.

== Geography ==
Sergeyevo is located 10 km south of Vyazniki (the district's administrative centre) by road. Tsentralny is the nearest rural locality.
