= Nevezhino =

Nevezhino Невежино
- Village
- Location within Vladimir Oblast Location within Russia
- Coordinates: 56°06′N 41°43′E
- Country: Russia
- Region: Vladimir Oblast
- District: Vyaznikovsky District
- Time zone: UTC+3:00

Nevezhino (Russian: Невежино) is a rural locality (a village) in Styopantsevskoye Rural Settlement, Vyaznikovsky District, Vladimir Oblast, Russia. The population was 5 as of 2010.

== Geography ==
By road, Nevezhino is located 39 km southwest of Vyazniki (the district's administrative centre). Burtsevo is the nearest rural locality.
