= Vysokovo =

Vysokovo Высоково
- Village
- Location within Vladimir Oblast Location within Russia
- Coordinates: 56°17′N 41°46′E
- Country: Russia
- Region: Vladimir Oblast
- District: Vyaznikovsky District
- Time zone: UTC+3:00

Vysokovo (Russian: Высоково) is a rural locality (a village) in Saryevskoye Rural Settlement, Vyaznikovsky District, Vladimir Oblast, Russia. The population was 3 as of 2010.

== Geography ==
Vysokovo is located on the Tara River, 32 km west of Vyazniki (the district's administrative centre) by road. Saryeyvo is the nearest rural locality.
