= Paustovo =

Paustovo Паустово
- Village
- Location within Vladimir Oblast Location within Russia
- Coordinates: 56°07′N 42°10′E
- Country: Russia
- Region: Vladimir Oblast
- District: Vyaznikovsky District
- Time zone: UTC+3:00

Paustovo (Russian: Паустово) is a rural locality (a village) and the administrative center of Paustovskoye Rural Settlement, Vyaznikovsky District, Vladimir Oblast, Russia. The population was 1,140 as of 2010. There are 13 streets.

== Geography ==
Paustovo is located 19 km south of Vyazniki (the district's administrative centre) by road. Uspensky Pogost is the nearest rural locality.
