= Bolshevysokovo =

Bolshevysokovo Большевысоково
- Village
- Location within Vladimir Oblast Location within Russia
- Coordinates: 56°10′N 41°51′E
- Country: Russia
- Region: Vladimir Oblast
- District: Vyaznikovsky District
- Time zone: UTC+3:00

Bolshevysokovo (Russian: Большевысоково) is a rural locality (a village) in Oktyabrskoye Rural Settlement, Vyaznikovsky District, Vladimir Oblast, Russia. The population was 265 as of 2010. There are 6 streets.

== Geography ==
Bolshevysokovo is located 24 km southwest of Vyazniki (the district's administrative centre) by road. Maloye Vysokovo is the nearest rural locality.
