= Zobishchi =

Zobishchi Зобищи
- Village
- Location within Vladimir Oblast Location within Russia
- Coordinates: 56°11′N 42°01′E
- Country: Russia
- Region: Vladimir Oblast
- District: Vyaznikovsky District
- Time zone: UTC+3:00

Zobishchi (Russian: Зобищи) is a rural locality (a village) in Oktyabrskoye Rural Settlement, Vyaznikovsky District, Vladimir Oblast, Russia. The population was 32 as of 2010.

== Geography ==
Zobishchi is located 15 km southwest of Vyazniki (the district's administrative centre) by road. Luknovo is the nearest rural locality.
