= Timino, Vyaznikovsky District, Vladimir Oblast =

Timino Тимино
- Village
- Location within Vladimir Oblast Location within Russia
- Coordinates: 56°18′N 41°57′E
- Country: Russia
- Region: Vladimir Oblast
- District: Vyaznikovsky District
- Time zone: UTC+3:00

Timino (Russian: Тимино) is a rural locality (a village) in Mstyora Urban Settlement, Vyaznikovsky District, Vladimir Oblast, Russia. The population was 12 as of 2010.

== Geography ==
Timino is located 18 km northwest of Vyazniki (the district's administrative centre) by road. Naleskino is the nearest rural locality.
