= Senkovo =

Senkovo Сеньково
- Settlement
- Location within Vladimir Oblast Location within Russia
- Coordinates: 56°13′N 42°01′E
- Country: Russia
- Region: Vladimir Oblast
- District: Vyaznikovsky District
- Time zone: UTC+3:00

Senkovo (Russian: Сеньково) is a rural locality (a settlement) in Oktyabrskoye Rural Settlement, Vyaznikovsky District, Vladimir Oblast, Russia. The population was 81 as of 2010.

== Geography ==
Senkovo is located 11 km southwest of Vyazniki (the district's administrative centre) by road. Oktyabrsky is the nearest rural locality.
