= Mitiny Derevenki =

Mitiny Derevenki Митины Деревеньки
- Village
- Location within Vladimir Oblast Location within Russia
- Coordinates: 56°17′N 42°07′E
- Country: Russia
- Region: Vladimir Oblast
- District: Vyaznikovsky District
- Time zone: UTC+3:00

Mitiny Derevenki (Russian: Митины Деревеньки) is a rural locality (a village) in Gorod Vyazniki, Vyaznikovsky District, Vladimir Oblast, Russia. The population was 46 as of 2010.

== Geography ==
Mitiny Derevenki is located near the Klyazma River, 8 km northwest of Vyazniki (the district's administrative centre) by road. Seltsovy Derevenki is the nearest rural locality.
