= Palkovo =

Palkovo Палково
- Village
- Location within Vladimir Oblast Location within Russia
- Coordinates: 56°07′N 42°09′E
- Country: Russia
- Region: Vladimir Oblast
- District: Vyaznikovsky District
- Time zone: UTC+3:00

Palkovo (Russian: Палково) is a rural locality (a village) in Paustovskoye Rural Settlement, Vyaznikovsky District, Vladimir Oblast, Russia. The population was 39 as of 2010.

== Geography ==
Palkovo is located 18 km south of Vyazniki (the district's administrative centre) by road. Paustovo is the nearest rural locality.
