= Vyazovka, Vladimir Oblast =

Vyazovka Вязовка
- Village
- Location within Vladimir Oblast Location within Russia
- Coordinates: 56°15′N 41°51′E
- Country: Russia
- Region: Vladimir Oblast
- District: Vyaznikovsky District
- Time zone: UTC+3:00

Vyazovka (Russian: Вязовка) is a rural locality (a village) in Mstyora Urban Settlement, Vyaznikovsky District, Vladimir Oblast, Russia. The population was 62 as of 2010.

== Geography ==
Vyazovka is located 21 km west of Vyazniki (the district's administrative centre) by road. Mstyora is the nearest rural locality.
