= Dudkino =

Dudkino Дудкино
- Village
- Location within Vladimir Oblast Location within Russia
- Coordinates: 56°11′N 41°58′E
- Country: Russia
- Region: Vladimir Oblast
- District: Vyaznikovsky District
- Time zone: UTC+3:00

Dudkino (Russian: Дудкино) is a rural locality (a village) in Oktyabrskoye Rural Settlement, Vyaznikovsky District, Vladimir Oblast, Russia. The population was 14 as of 2010.

== Geography ==
Dudkino is located 18 km southwest of Vyazniki (the district's administrative centre) by road. Serkovo is the nearest rural locality.
