= Zhelnino, Vyaznikovsky District, Vladimir Oblast =

Zhelnino Желнино
- Village
- Location within Vladimir Oblast Location within Russia
- Coordinates: 56°05′N 41°57′E
- Country: Russia
- Region: Vladimir Oblast
- District: Vyaznikovsky District
- Time zone: UTC+3:00

Zhelnino (Russian: Желнино) is a rural locality (a village) in Posyolok Nikologory, Vyaznikovsky District, Vladimir Oblast, Russia. The population was 23 as of 2010.

== Geography ==
Zhelnino is located 26 km southwest of Vyazniki (the district's administrative centre) by road. Ivankovo is the nearest rural locality.
