= Malovskaya =

Malovskaya Маловская
- Village
- Location within Vladimir Oblast Location within Russia
- Coordinates: 56°06′N 41°57′E
- Country: Russia
- Region: Vladimir Oblast
- District: Vyaznikovsky District
- Time zone: UTC+3:00

Malovskaya (Russian: Маловская) is a rural locality (a village) in Posyolok Nikologory, Vyaznikovsky District, Vladimir Oblast, Russia. The population was 214 as of 2010. There are 6 streets.

== Geography ==
Malovskaya is located 25 km southwest of Vyazniki (the district's administrative centre) by road. Nikologory is the nearest rural locality.
