= Belaya Ramen =

Belaya Ramen Белая Рамень
- Village
- Location within Vladimir Oblast Location within Russia
- Coordinates: 55°55′N 42°05′E
- Country: Russia
- Region: Vladimir Oblast
- District: Vyaznikovsky District
- Time zone: UTC+3:00

Belaya Ramen (Russian: Белая Рамень) is a rural locality (a village) in Paustovskoye Rural Settlement, Vyaznikovsky District, Vladimir Oblast, Russia. The population was 12 as of 2010.

== Geography ==
Belaya Ramen is located on the Indrus River, 43 km south of Vyazniki (the district's administrative centre) by road. Mikhalchugovo is the nearest rural locality.
