= Saryevo =

Saryevo Сарыево
- Settlement
- Location within Vladimir Oblast Location within Russia
- Coordinates: 56°17′N 41°42′E
- Country: Russia
- Region: Vladimir Oblast
- District: Vyaznikovsky District
- Time zone: UTC+3:00

Saryevo (Russian: Сарыево) is a rural locality (a settlement) in Saryevskoye Rural Settlement, Vyaznikovsky District, Vladimir Oblast, Russia. The population was 641 as of 2010.

== Geography ==
The village is located 4 km north-west from Saryevo and 30 km west from Vyazniki.
