= Kharino, Vladimir Oblast =

Kharino Харино
- Village
- Location within Vladimir Oblast Location within Russia
- Coordinates: 56°03′N 41°59′E
- Country: Russia
- Region: Vladimir Oblast
- District: Vyaznikovsky District
- Time zone: UTC+3:00

Kharino (Russian: Харино) is a rural locality (a village) in Posyolok Nikologory, Vyaznikovsky District, Vladimir Oblast, Russia. The population was 22 as of 2010.

== Geography ==
Kharino is located 31 km southwest of Vyazniki (the district's administrative centre) by road. Proskuryakovo is the nearest rural locality.
