= Miklyayevo =

Miklyayevo Микляево
- Village
- Location within Vladimir Oblast Location within Russia
- Coordinates: 56°00′N 42°10′E
- Country: Russia
- Region: Vladimir Oblast
- District: Vyaznikovsky District
- Time zone: UTC+3:00

Miklyayevo (Russian: Микляево) is a rural locality (a village) in Paustovskoye Rural Settlement, Vyaznikovsky District, Vladimir Oblast, Russia. The population was 2 as of 2010.

== Geography ==
Miklyayevo is located 43 km south of Vyazniki (the district's administrative centre) by road. Obednino is the nearest rural locality.
