= Ilyina Gora =

Ilyina Gora Ильина Гора
- Village
- Location within Vladimir Oblast Location within Russia
- Coordinates: 56°12′N 42°24′E
- Country: Russia
- Region: Vladimir Oblast
- District: Vyaznikovsky District
- Time zone: UTC+3:00

Ilyina Gora (Russian: Ильина Гора) is a rural locality (a village) in Gorod Vyazniki, Vyaznikovsky District, Vladimir Oblast, Russia. The population was 34 as of 2010.

== Geography ==
Ilyina Gora is located on the Klyazma River, 17 km east of Vyazniki (the district's administrative centre) by road. Perovo is the nearest rural locality.
