= Sinyatkino =

Sinyatkino Синяткино
- Village
- Location within Vladimir Oblast Location within Russia
- Coordinates: 56°09′N 42°01′E
- Country: Russia
- Region: Vladimir Oblast
- District: Vyaznikovsky District
- Time zone: UTC+3:00

Sinyatkino (Russian: Синяткино) is a rural locality (a village) in Posyolok Nikologory, Vyaznikovsky District, Vladimir Oblast, Russia. The population was 51 as of 2010. There is 1 street.

== Geography ==
Sinyatkino is located 19 km southwest of Vyazniki (the district's administrative centre) by road. Nikologory is the nearest rural locality.
