= Ponomaryovo, Vyaznikovsky District, Vladimir Oblast =

Ponomaryovo Пономарёво
- Village
- Location within Vladimir Oblast Location within Russia
- Coordinates: 56°09′N 41°48′E
- Country: Russia
- Region: Vladimir Oblast
- District: Vyaznikovsky District
- Time zone: UTC+3:00

Ponomaryovo (Russian: Пономарёво) is a rural locality (a village) in Oktyabrskoye Rural Settlement, Vyaznikovsky District, Vladimir Oblast, Russia. The population was 15 as of 2010.

== Geography ==
Ponomaryovo is located 25 km southwest of Vyazniki (the district's administrative centre) by road. Pozdnyakovo is the nearest rural locality.
