= Oborino =

Oborino Оборино
- Village
- Location within Vladimir Oblast Location within Russia
- Coordinates: 56°07′N 40°16′E
- Country: Russia
- Region: Vladimir Oblast
- District: Vladimir
- Time zone: UTC+3:00

Oborino (Russian: Оборино) is a rural locality (a village) in Vladimir, Vladimir Oblast, Russia. The population was 47 as of 2010. There is 1 street.

== Geography ==
Oborino is located 12 km west of Vladimir. Spasskoye is the nearest rural locality.
