= Nemtsovo =

Nemtsovo Немцово
- Village
- Location within Vladimir Oblast Location within Russia
- Coordinates: 56°07′N 40°17′E
- Country: Russia
- Region: Vladimir Oblast
- District: Vladimir
- Time zone: UTC+3:00

Nemtsovo (Russian: Немцово) is a rural locality (a village) in Vladimir, Vladimir Oblast, Russia. The population was 7 as of 2010. There are 15 streets.

== Geography ==
Nemtsovo is located 13 km west of Vladimir. Oborino is the nearest rural locality.
