= Nikulino, Vladimir =

Nikulino Никулино
- Village
- Location within Vladimir Oblast Location within Russia
- Coordinates: 56°04′N 40°32′E
- Country: Russia
- Region: Vladimir Oblast
- District: Vladimir
- Time zone: UTC+3:00

Nikulino (Russian: Никулино) is a rural locality (a village) in Vladimir, Vladimir Oblast, Russia. The population was 139 as of 2010. There are 2 streets.

== Geography ==
Nikulino is located 13 km southeast of Vladimir. Shepelevo is the nearest rural locality.
