= Zlobino, Vladimir =

Zlobino Злобино
- Village
- Location within Vladimir Oblast Location within Russia
- Coordinates: 56°05′N 40°34′E
- Country: Russia
- Region: Vladimir Oblast
- District: Vladimir
- Time zone: UTC+3:00

Zlobino (Russian: Злобино) is a rural locality (a village) in Vladimir, Vladimir Oblast, Russia. The population was 8 as of 2010. There are 4 streets.
