= Shepelevo =

Shepelevo Шепелево
- Village
- Location within Vladimir Oblast Location within Russia
- Coordinates: 56°04′N 40°32′E
- Country: Russia
- Region: Vladimir Oblast
- District: Vladimir
- Time zone: UTC+3:00

Shepelevo (Russian: Шепелево) is a rural locality (a village) in Vladimir, Vladimir Oblast, Russia. The population was 139 in 2021, down from 161 as of 2010. There are 2 streets.

== Geography ==
Shepelevo is located 14 km southeast of Vladimir. Nikulino is the nearest rural locality.
