= Kusunovo =

Kusunovo Кусуново
- Selo
- Location within Vladimir Oblast Location within Russia
- Coordinates: 56°07′N 40°29′E
- Country: Russia
- Region: Vladimir Oblast
- District: Vladimir
- Time zone: UTC+3:00

Kusunovo (Russian: Кусуново) is a rural locality (a selo) in Vladimir, Vladimir Oblast, Russia. The population was 64 as of 2010. There are 5 streets.

== Geography ==
Kusunovo is located 12 km southeast of Vladimir. Uvarovo is the nearest rural locality.
