= Ushcher =

Ushcher Ущер
- Selo
- Location within Vladimir Oblast Location within Russia
- Coordinates: 56°07′N 40°39′E
- Country: Russia
- Region: Vladimir Oblast
- District: Vladimir
- Time zone: UTC+3:00

Ushcher (Russian: Ущер) is a rural locality (a selo) in Vladimir, Vladimir Oblast, Russia. The population was 1 as of 2010. There is 1 street.

== Geography ==
Ushcher is located 23 km east of Vladimir. Shirmanikha is the nearest rural locality.
