= Dolgaya Luzha =

Dolgaya Luzha Долгая Лужа
- Settlement
- Location within Vladimir Oblast Location within Russia
- Coordinates: 56°08′N 40°30′E
- Country: Russia
- Region: Vladimir Oblast
- District: Vladimir
- Time zone: UTC+3:00

Dolgaya Luzha (Russian: Долгая Лужа) is a rural locality (a settlement) in Vladimir, Vladimir Oblast, Russia. The population was 18 as of 2010. There are 3 streets.

== Geography ==
Dolgaya Luzha is located 13 km northeast of Vladimir. Ladoga is the nearest rural locality.
