= Vilki =

Vilki Вилки
- Village
- Location within Vladimir Oblast Location within Russia
- Coordinates: 56°04′N 40°33′E
- Country: Russia
- Region: Vladimir Oblast
- District: Vladimir
- Time zone: UTC+3:00

Vilki (Russian: Вилки) is a rural locality (a village) in Vladimir, Vladimir Oblast, Russia. The population was 15 as of 2010. There is 1 street.

== Geography ==
Vilki is located 15 km southeast of Vladimir. Shepelevo is the nearest rural locality.
