= Zaklyazmensky =

Zaklyazmensky Заклязьменский
- Settlement
- Location within Vladimir Oblast Location within Russia
- Coordinates: 56°07′N 40°27′E
- Country: Russia
- Region: Vladimir Oblast
- District: Vladimir
- Time zone: UTC+3:00

Zaklyazmensky (Russian: Заклязьменский) is a rural locality (a settlement) in Vladimir, Vladimir Oblast, Russia. The population was 1,373 as of 2010. There are five streets.

== Geography ==
Zaklyazmensky is located 7 km southeast of Vladimir. Kommunar is the nearest rural locality.
