= Krasnoye Ekho =

Rural locality in Gus-Khrustalny District, Vladimir Oblast, Russia

Coordinates: 55°47′N 40°42′E

Krasnoye Ekho (Russian: Кра́сное Э́хо) is a settlement in Vladimir Oblast, Russia, located on the Poboyki River, 40 kilometers (25 mi) south-east of Vladimir. Population: 2,295 (2002 census); 2,185 (1989 Soviet census).

It was founded as the settlement of Novgorodino (Новгоро́дино) in 1875, when merchant Komissarov built the Novo-Gorodinsky glass-works here (renamed "Krasnoye Ekho" in 1924). In 1940, it was granted urban-type settlement status in 1940 and demoted back in status to that of a rural locality in 2005.

The modern name of the settlement comes from the Krasnoye Ekho glass-works; one of the oldest glass-works in Russia.
