= Bukholovo =

Bukholovo Бухолово
- Village
- Location within Vladimir Oblast Location within Russia
- Coordinates: 56°06′N 40°33′E
- Country: Russia
- Region: Vladimir Oblast
- District: Vladimir
- Time zone: UTC+3:00

Bukholovo (Russian: Бухолово) is a rural locality (a village) in Vladimir, Vladimir Oblast, Russia. The population was 1 as of 2010. There are 5 streets.
