= Mosino =

Mosino Мосино
- Selo
- Location within Vladimir Oblast Location within Russia
- Coordinates: 56°09′N 40°15′E
- Country: Russia
- Region: Vladimir Oblast
- District: Vladimir
- Time zone: UTC+3:00

Mosino (Russian: Мосино) is a rural locality (a selo) in Vladimir, Vladimir Oblast, Russia. The population was 18 as of 2010. There are 20 streets.

== Geography ==
Mosino is located 16 km west of Vladimir. Spasskoye is the nearest rural locality.
