= Vyazniki, Vladimir Oblast =

Town in Vladimir Oblast, Russia

Vyazniki Вязники
- Town
- Sieńkov mansion All Saints Church Church of the Intercession of the Theotokos

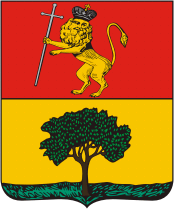
- Coat of arms
- Interactive map of Vyazniki
- Location of Vyazniki Vyazniki (Europe) Vyazniki (Russia)
- Coordinates: 56°15′N 42°10′E
- Country: Russia
- Federal subject: Vladimir Oblast
- Administrative district: Vyaznikovsky District
- First mentioned: 1608
- Town status since: 1778.
- Elevation: 130 m (430 ft)

Population (2010 Census)
  - Total: 41,248
  - Estimate (2025): 33,815 (−18%)

Administrative status
  - Capital of: Vyaznikovsky District

Municipal status
  - Municipal district: Vyaznikovsky Municipal District
  - Urban settlement: Vyazniki Urban Settlement
  - Capital of: Vyaznikovsky Municipal District, Vyazniki Urban Settlement
- Time zone: UTC+3 (MSK)
- Postal code: 601440–601446
- OKTMO ID: 17610101001

Vyazniki (Russian: Вя́зники) is a town and the administrative center of Vyaznikovsky District in Vladimir Oblast, Russia. Population: 36,203 (2021 census); 41,248 (2010 census); 40,398 (2002 census); 45,438 (1989 Soviet census).

== History ==
The strategic height overlooking the Klyazma River was of great importance for defending approaches to the medieval Russian capital of Vladimir. To that effect, a fortress was established there some time in the 12th century, most likely in the 1130s. The Yaropolk fortress took its name from one prince named Yaropolk. It was situated about halfway between the nearest Klyazma ports: Starodub-on-the-Klyazma and Gorokhovets.

After the Mongols destroyed the fortress in 1238, Yaropolk was next documented in the 1389 treaty between Vasily I and his uncle Vladimir the Bold.

The selo of Vyazniki likely appeared slightly downhill from Yaropolk in the end of the 16th century; its first mention in the documents was in 1608 and it quickly developed into a merchant sloboda. When Yaropolk was annihilated by fire in 1703, Vyazniki came to dominate the area. In 1778, Vyazniki was granted town status.

== Administrative and municipal status ==
Within the framework of administrative divisions, Vyazniki serves as the administrative center of Vyaznikovsky District, to which it is directly subordinated. As a municipal division, the town of Vyazniki, together with sixty-two rural localities in Vyaznikovsky District, is incorporated within Vyaznikovsky Municipal District as Vyazniki Urban Settlement.

== Economy ==
As of the beginning of the 21st century, Vyazniki is one of the centers of the flax industry of Russia.

== Religion ==
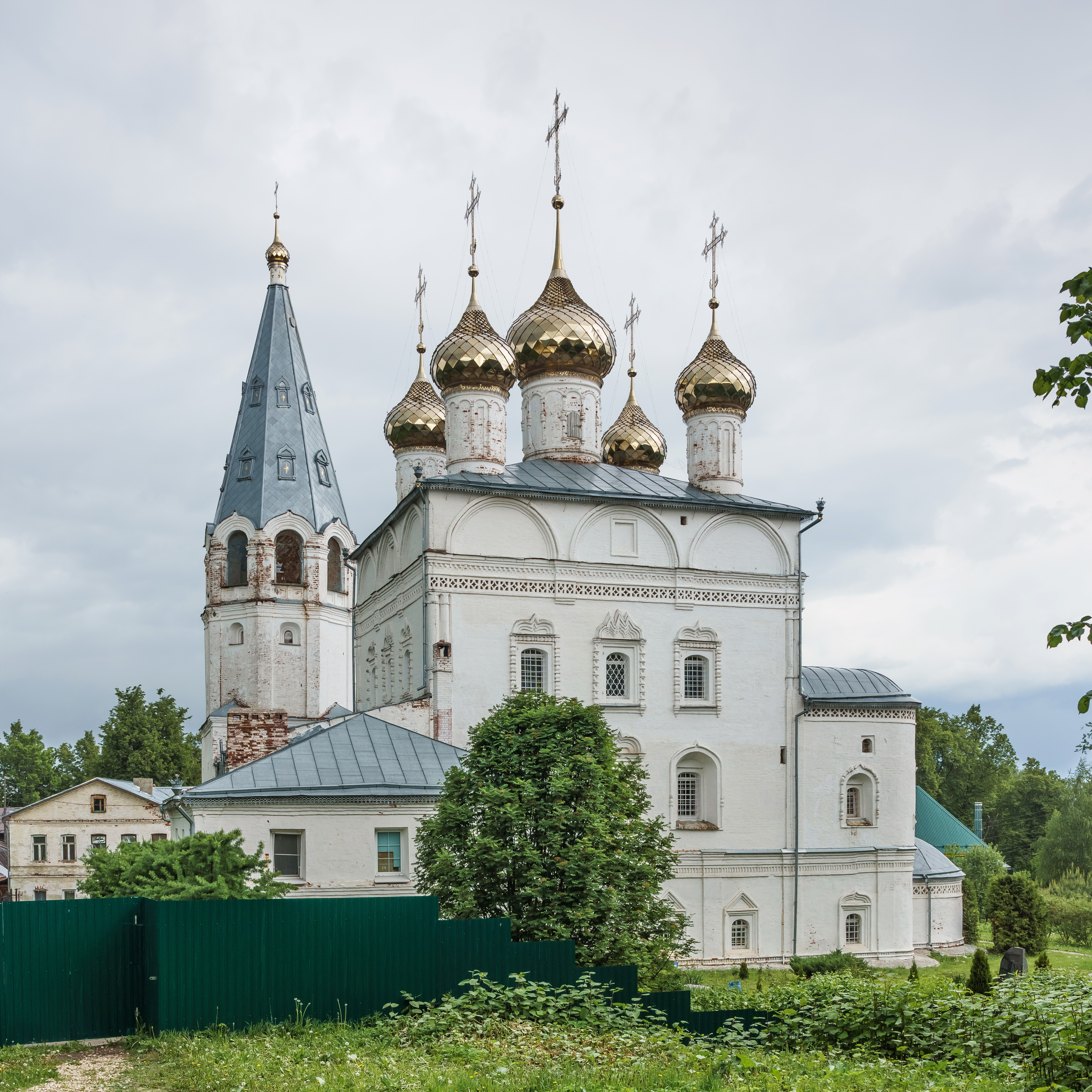
Annunciation church

The most notable landmark is the Annunciation Church, constructed between 1682 and 1689.
