= Vyaznikovsky District =

Vyaznikovsky District Вязниковский район (Russian)
- District
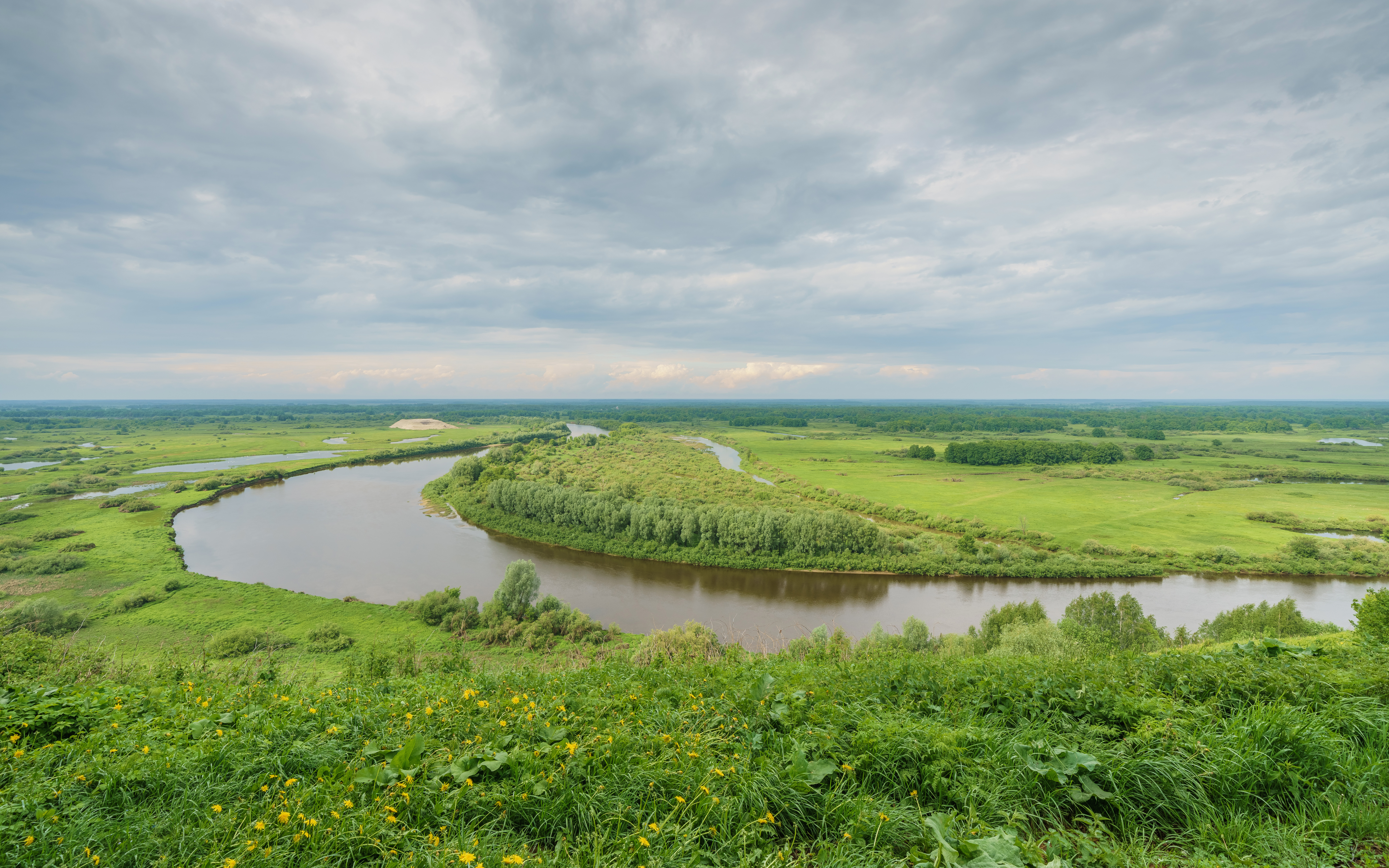
- The Klyazma River near the town of Vyazniki

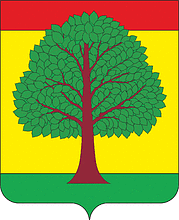
- Flag Coat of arms
- Location of Vyaznikovsky District in Vladimir Oblast
- Coordinates: 56°14′17″N 42°09′32″E
- Country: Russia
- Federal subject: Vladimir Oblast
- Established: 10 April 1929
- Administrative center: Vyazniki

Area
  - Total: 2,252 km^{2} (870 sq mi)

Population (2010 Census)
  - Total: 80,987
  - Density: 35.96/km^{2} (93.14/sq mi)
  - Urban: 63.7%
  - Rural: 36.3%

Administrative structure
  - Inhabited localities: 1 cities/towns, 2 urban-type settlements, 227 rural localities

Municipal structure
  - Municipally incorporated as: Vyaznikovsky Municipal District
  - Municipal divisions: 3 urban settlements, 4 rural settlements
- Time zone: UTC+3 (MSK)
- OKTMO ID: 17610000
- Website: http://adm-vyaz.ru/

Vyaznikovsky District (Russian: Вя́зниковский райо́н) is an administrative and municipal district (raion), one of the sixteen in Vladimir Oblast, Russia. It is located in the northeast of the oblast. The area of the district is 2,252 square kilometers (870 sq mi). Its administrative center is the town of Vyazniki. Population: 71,015 (2021 census); 80,987 (2010 census); 50,692 (2002 Census); 60,262 (1989 Soviet census). The population of Vyazniki accounts for 51.0% of the district's total population.
