= Estate (Russia) =

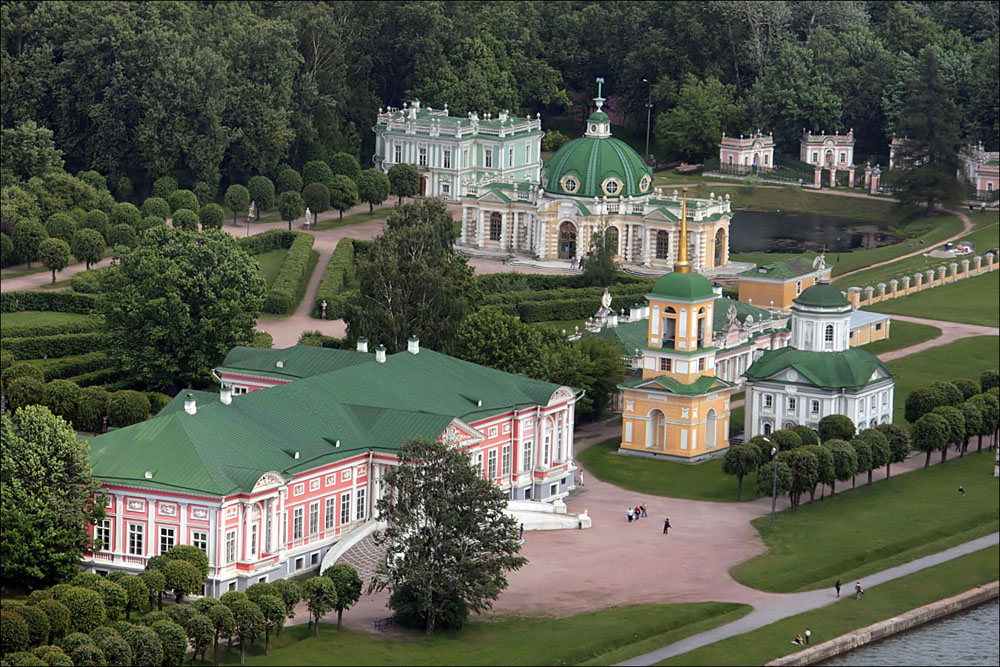
The Kuskovo Estate, which belongs to the Sheremetev family.

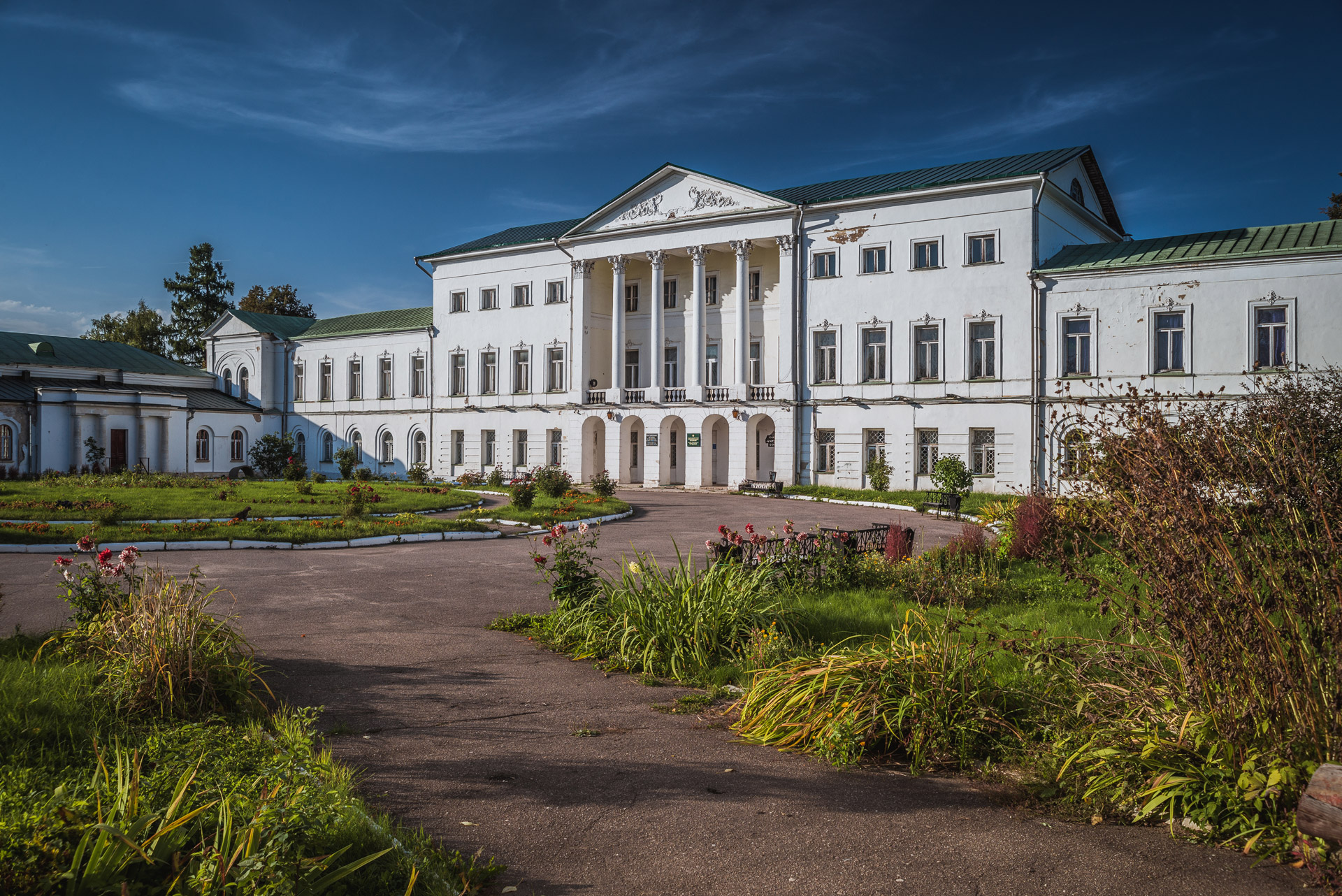
Estate of Аrseny Zakrevsky called Ivanovskoye

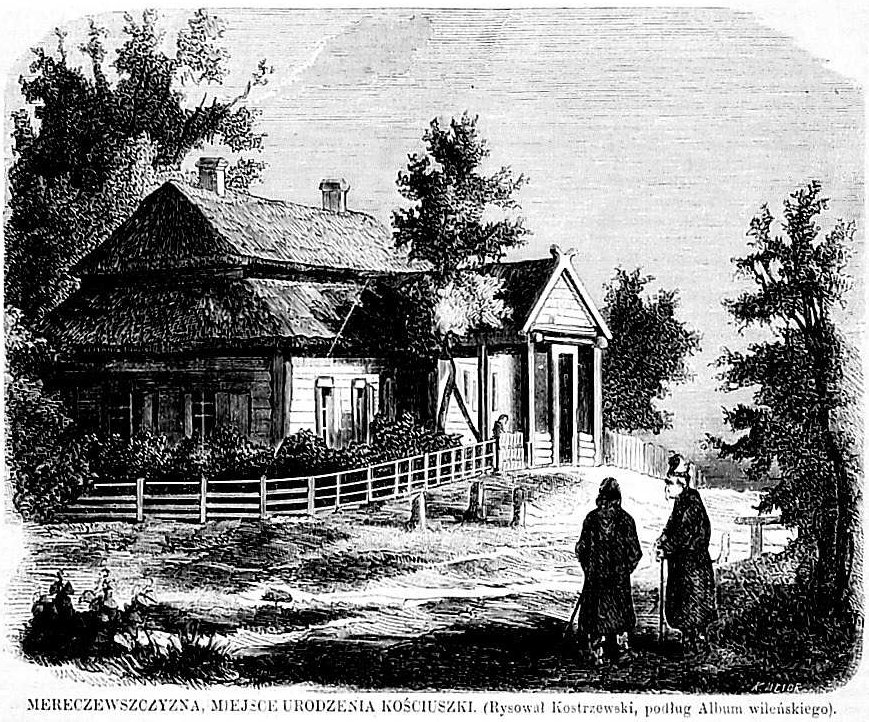
Estate of Tadeusz Kościuszko on the outskirts of Mieračoŭščyna in Belarus.

Estates (Russian: усадьба) in Russian architecture are typically a settlement complex of residential, household, parks and other buildings, as well as a manicured garden. Estates first appear in the 15th century in the Principality of Moscow and are associated with the estate system.

== Types of estates ==
The following categories each have a number of features that influenced the appearance of Russian estates:

- Boyar estates of the 17th century
- Landowners estates of the 18th-19th centuries
- City estates of the 18th-19th centuries
- Peasant estates

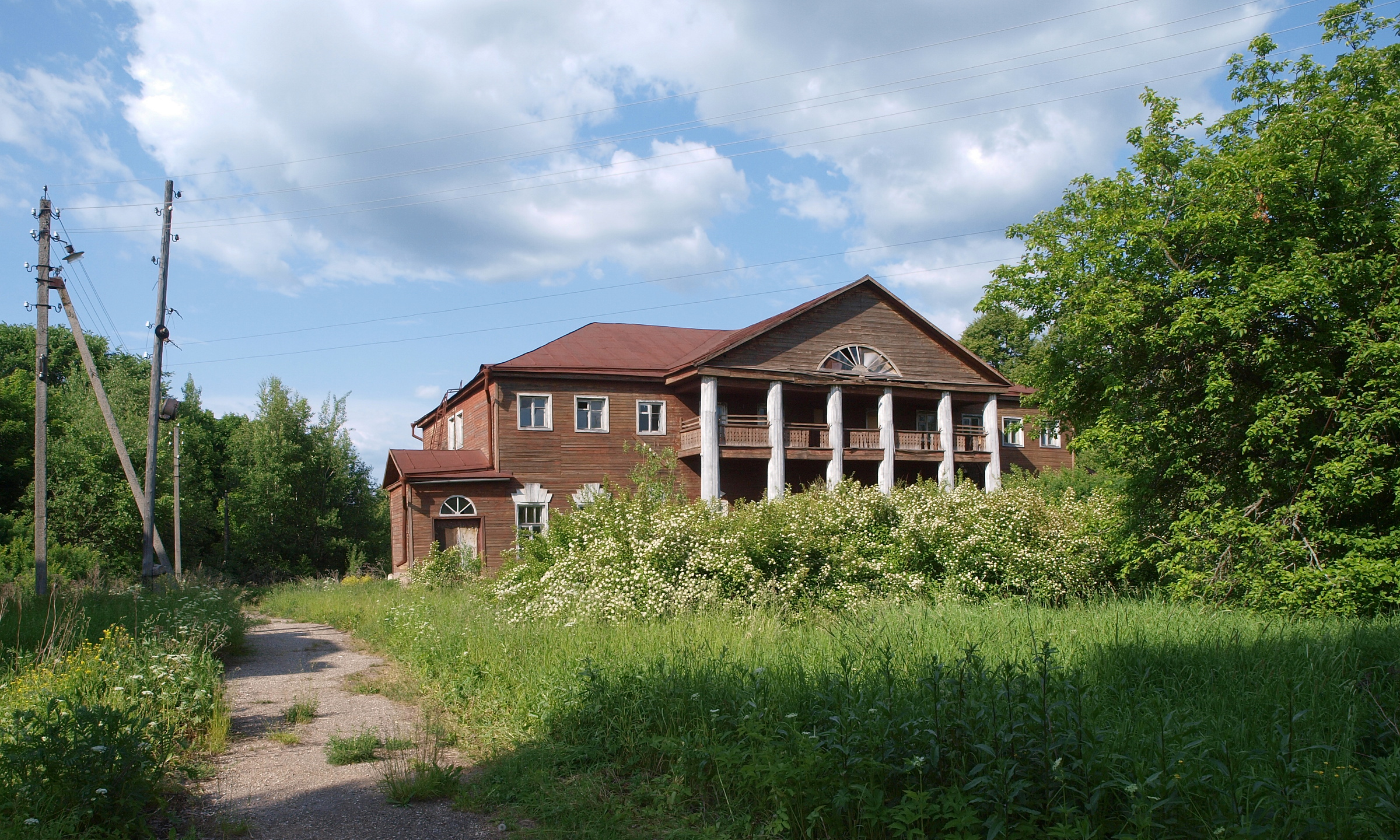
The Kudryavtsevs estate in Kaluga Oblast. Typical for the beginning of the 19th century, estate of a landowner with a smaller amount of land.

A classic manor estate usually included a main manor house, several wings, stables, оrangeries, buildings for servants, etc. The park adjacent to the estate most often had landscape character, like ponds, alleys, gazebos, grottos and more. In larger estates, churches were often built.

Urban noble estates, typical for Мoscow, and to a lesser extent for Saint Petersburg, usually included a master's house, "services" (stables, sheds, servants' quarters), and a small garden.

Many Russian estates were built according to the original designs of famous architects. The estates that belonged to famous collectors often had significant cultural values, such as collections of visual arts and decorative arts.

A number of estates that belonged to well-known patrons of the arts gained fame as important centers of cultural life (for example, Talashkino). Other estates became famous due to famous owners (Tarkhany, Boldino).

After the October Revolution, many owners abandoned their estates, most of which were plundered and destroyed. A significant part of the book collections and valuable works of art managed to be saved and placed in libraries and museums. A number of estates during the years of Soviet power were turned into museums such as the Arkhangelskoye, Kuskovo, Ostankino, Yasnaya Polyana and others.

According to the "Revival of the Russian Estate" foundation, at the end of 2007, there were about 7 thousand estates that are monuments of history and architecture, and about two-thirds are in disarray.

=== Estates and the restoration of Moscow ===
After the Fire of Moscow in 1812, almost two thirds of Moscow was burned and steps were taken to restore the city and help victims. First of all, it was necessary to provide the affected Muscovites with housing. In February 1813, the Russian Emperor Alexander I establishes the "Commission for Construction in Moscow." Joseph Bové was responsible for the architectural department and Yegor Cheliev was responsible for the engineering department. The architects Domenico Gilardi, Afanasy Grigoriev and others also took part in the restoration of the city. The basis of the construction was formed by albums with typical projects of buildings, that included estates. Residents could pick which building they wanted according to their tastes and the cost of construction. These ready-made architectural solutions made it possible to build buildings quickly and at minimal cost. The plan was so successful that by 1816 most of the houses of Moscow had been restored.

=== Gallery ===
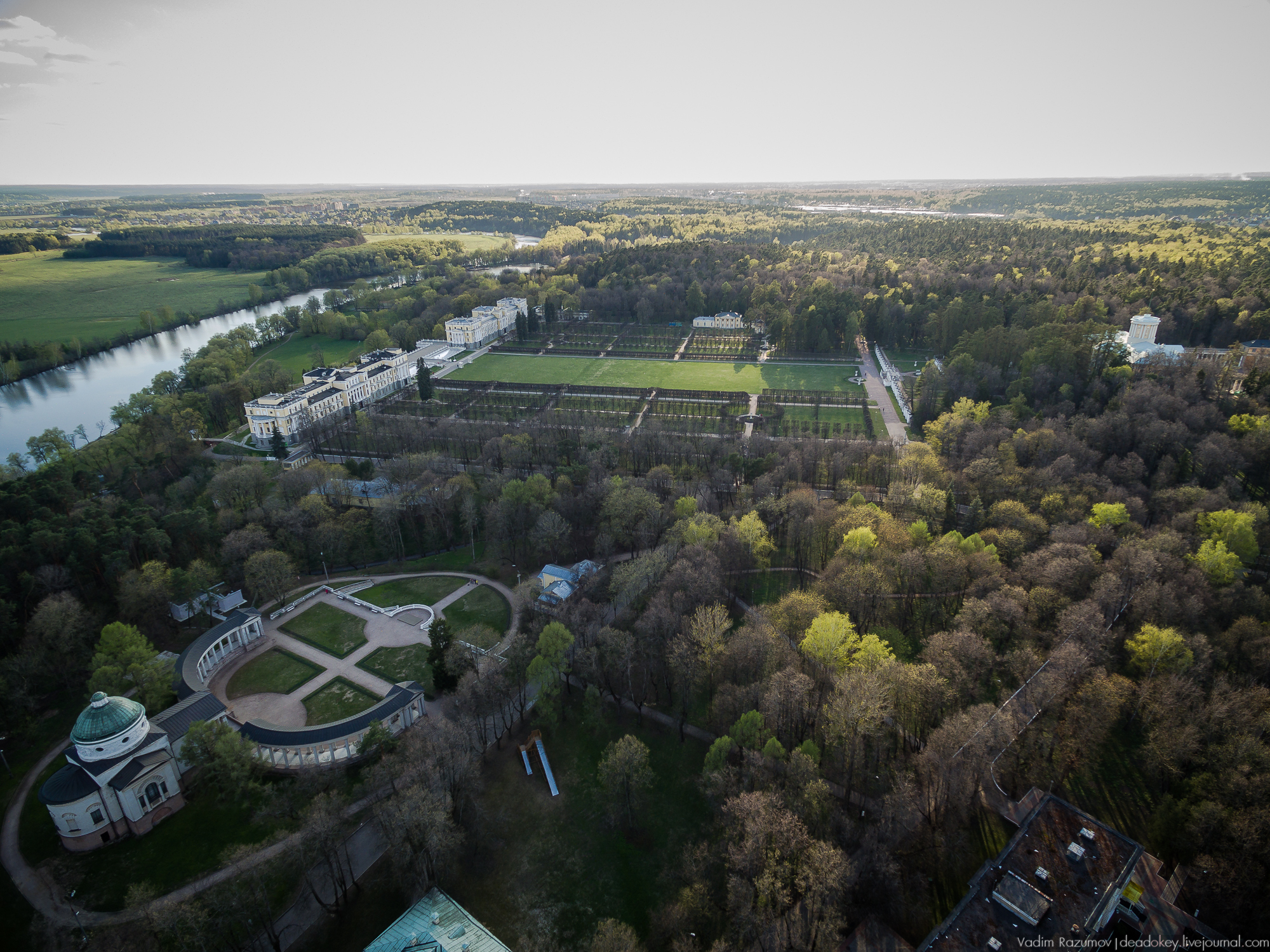
Arkhangelskoye Estate of Yusupov

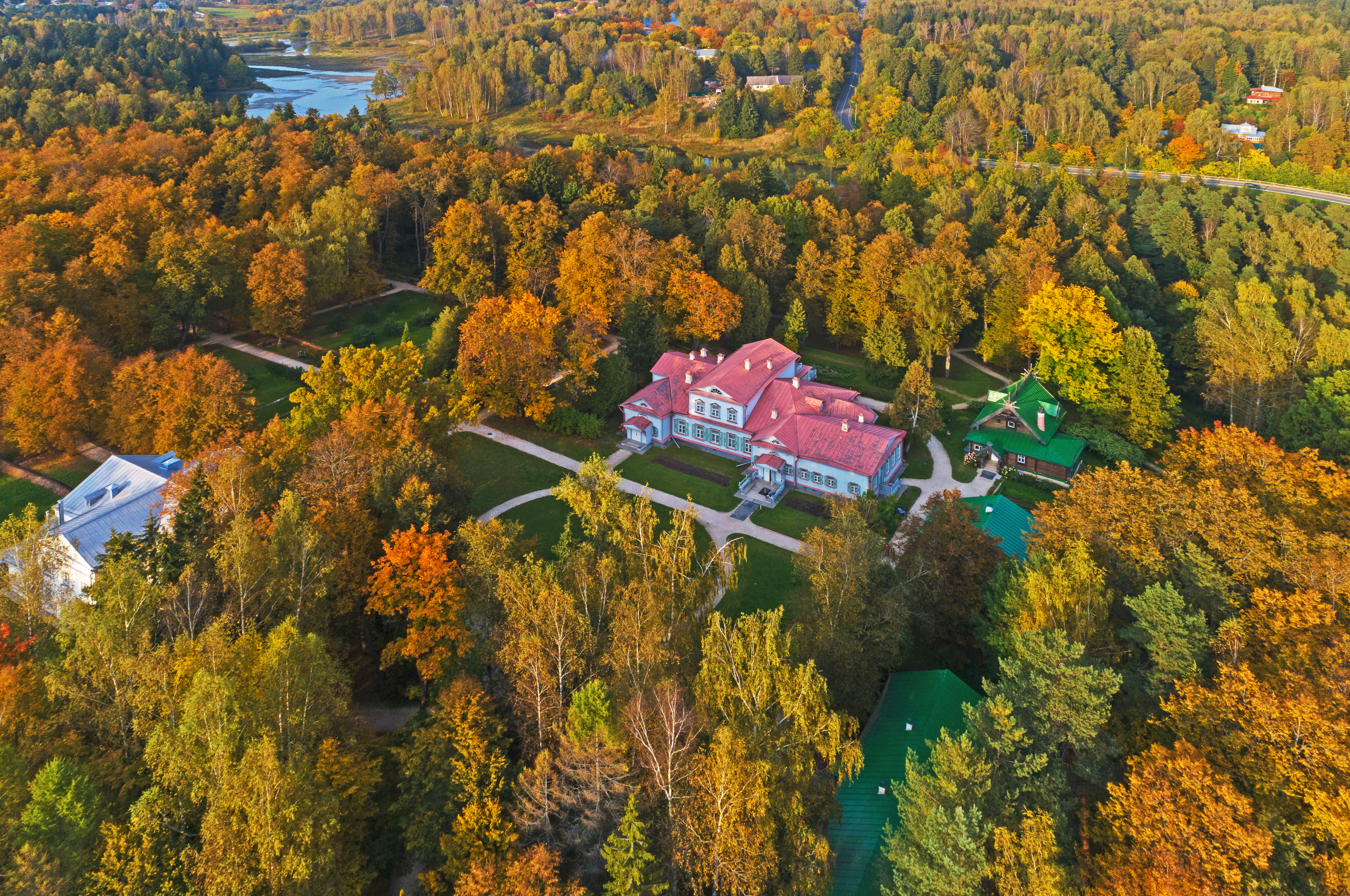
Abramtsevo Estate of Savva Mamontov

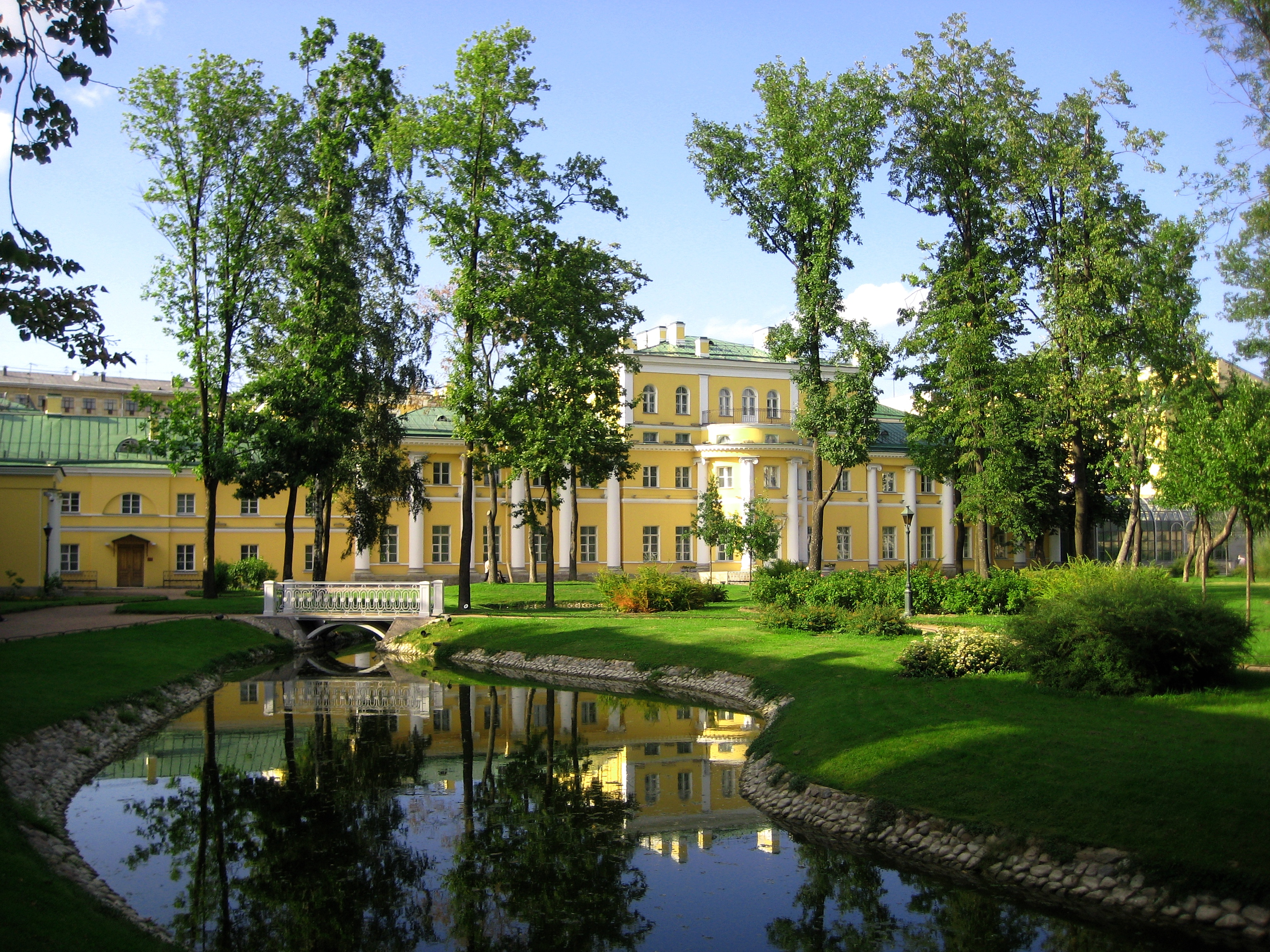
Derzhavin Estate of Gavrila Derzhavin

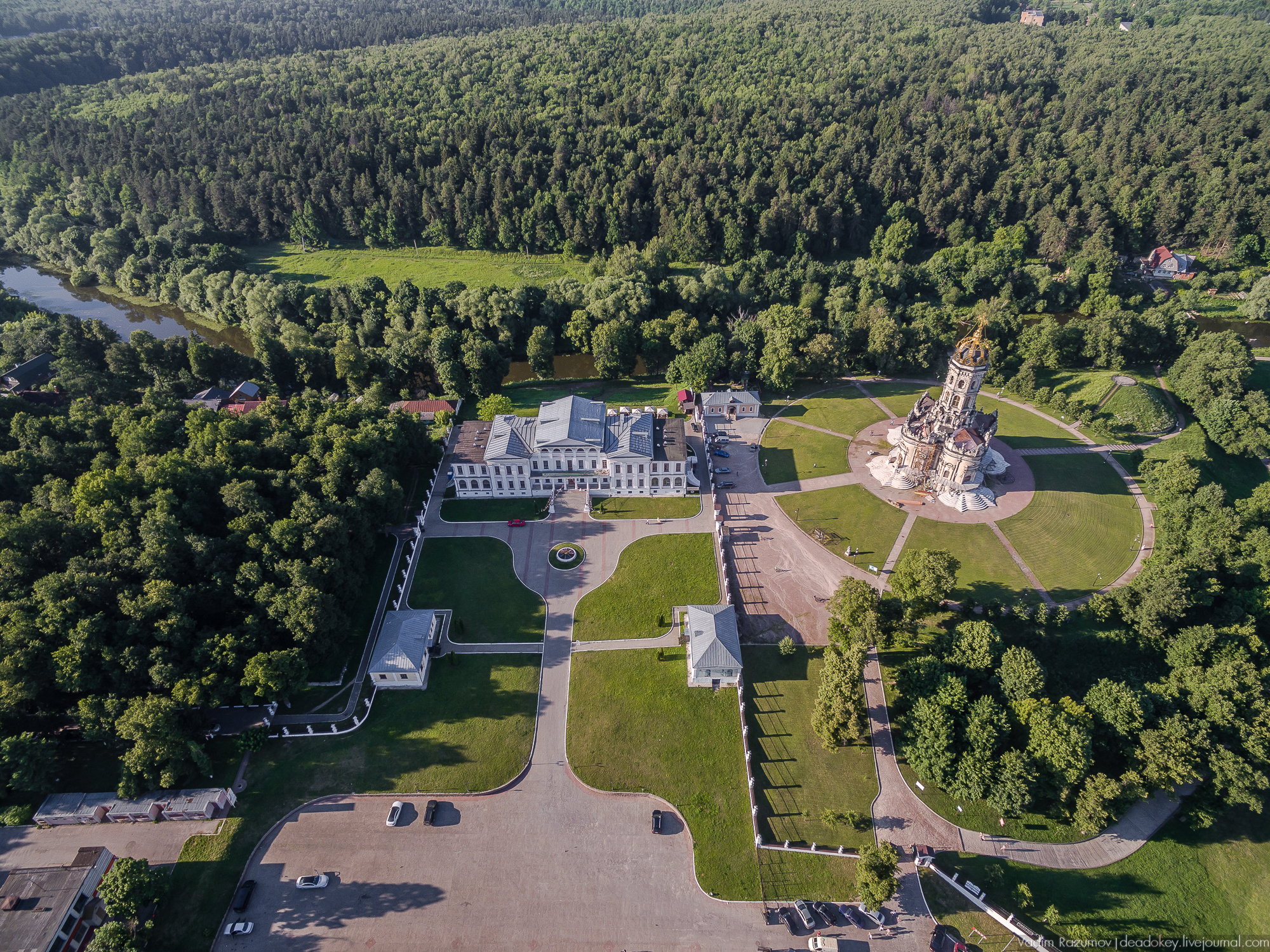
Dubrovitsy Estate of Golitsyn

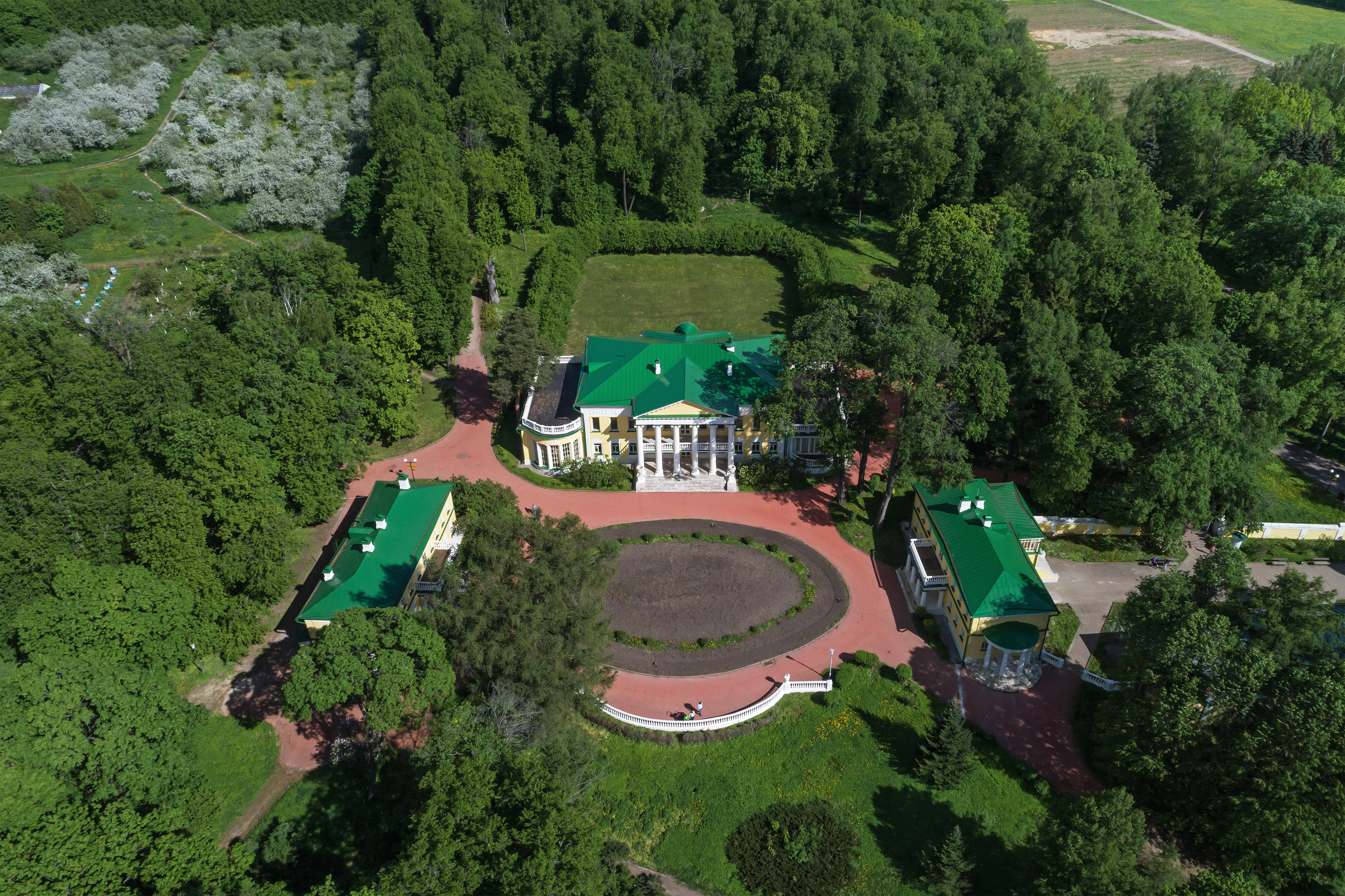
Gorki Estate of Spasitelev

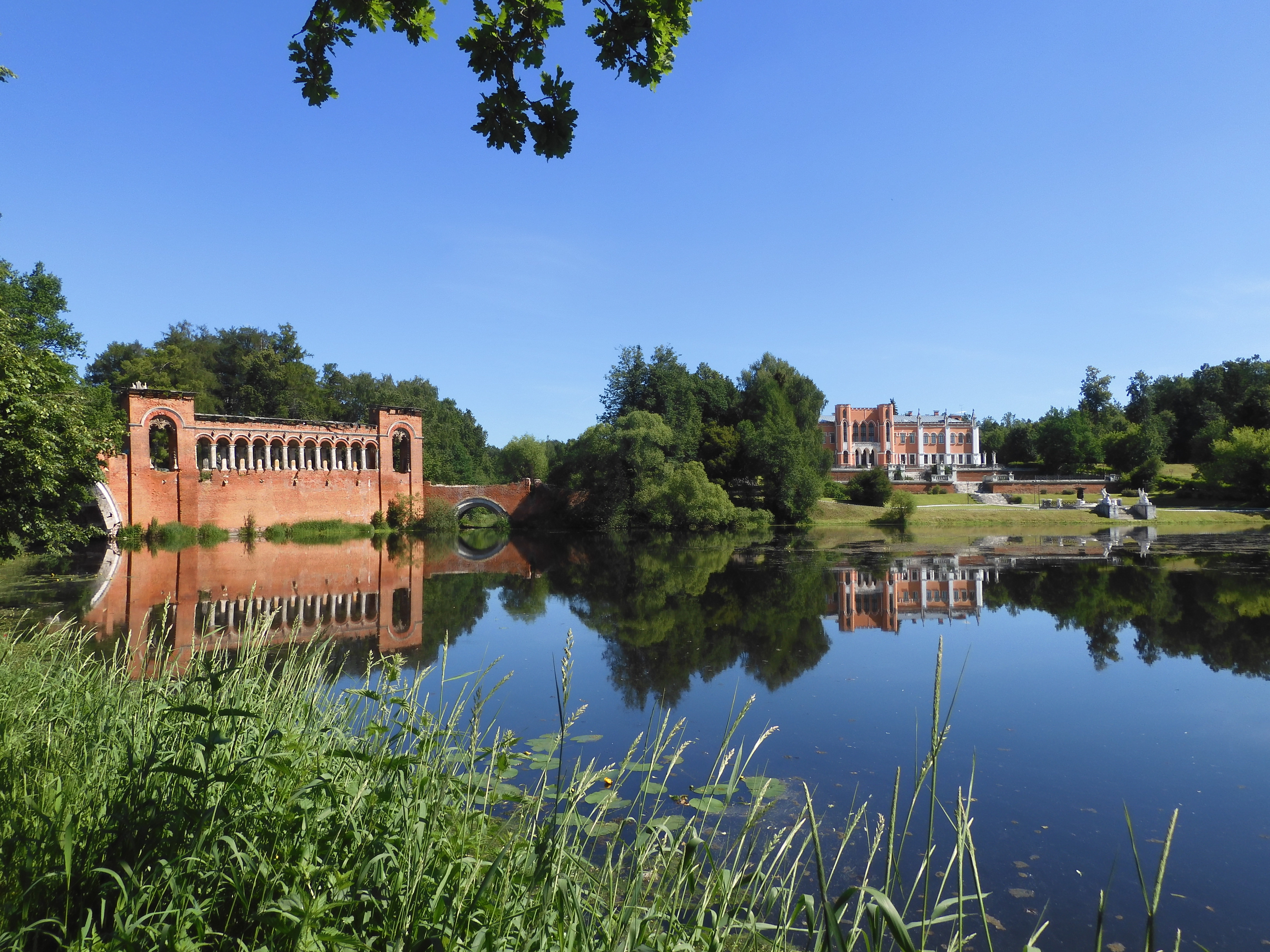
Marfino Estate of Sofia Panina

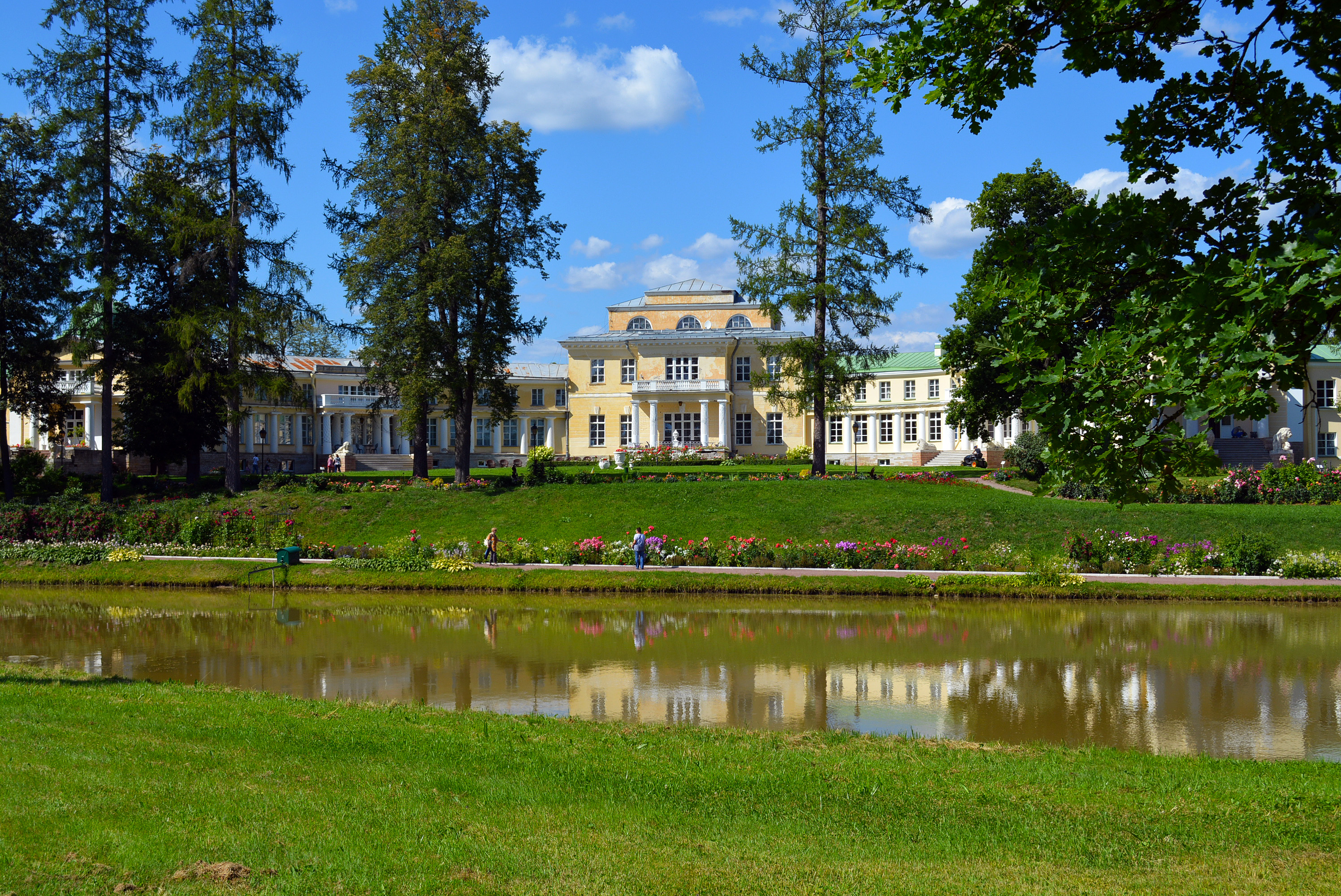
Maryino Estate of Stroganov

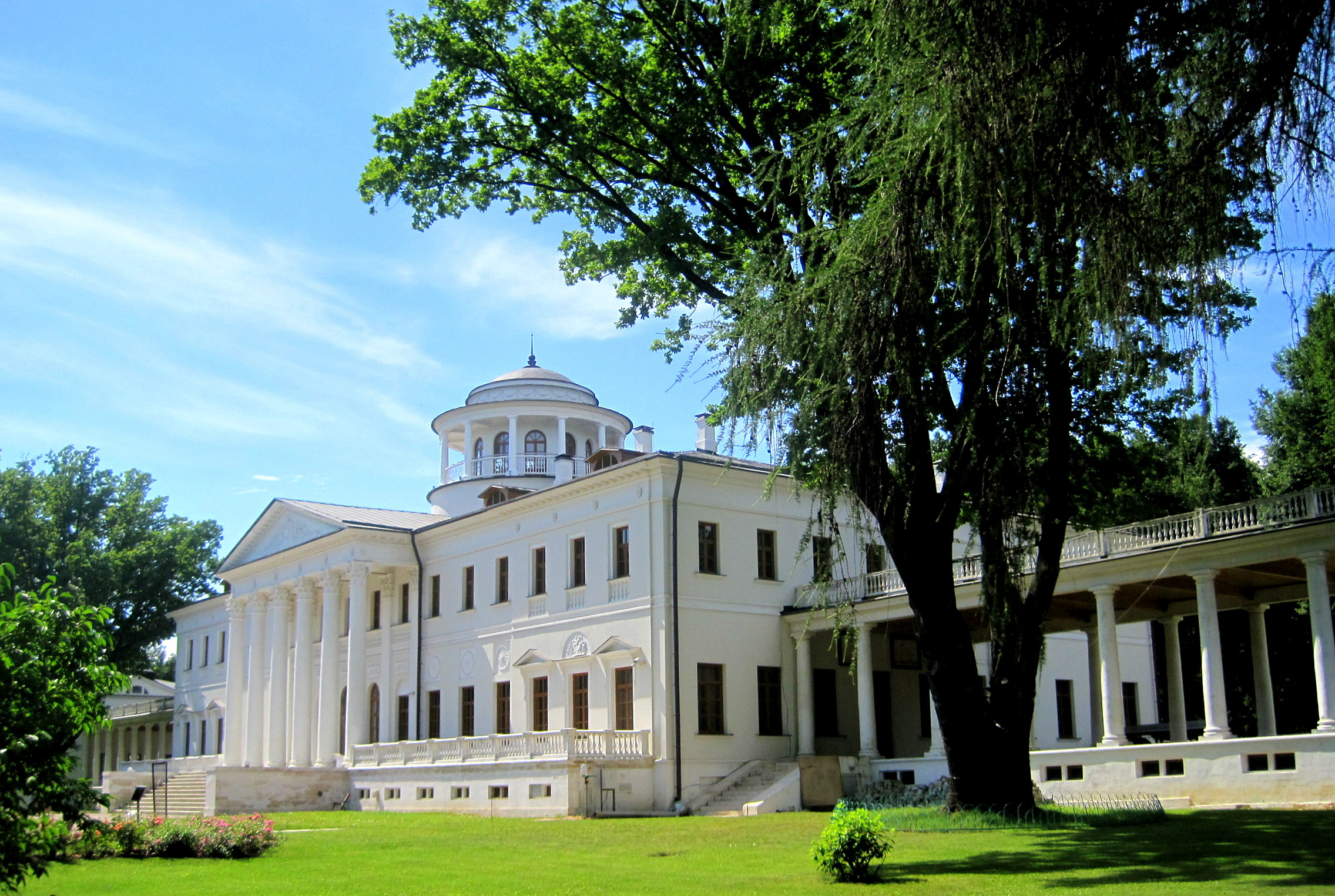
Ostafievo Estate of Vyazemsky and Sheremetev

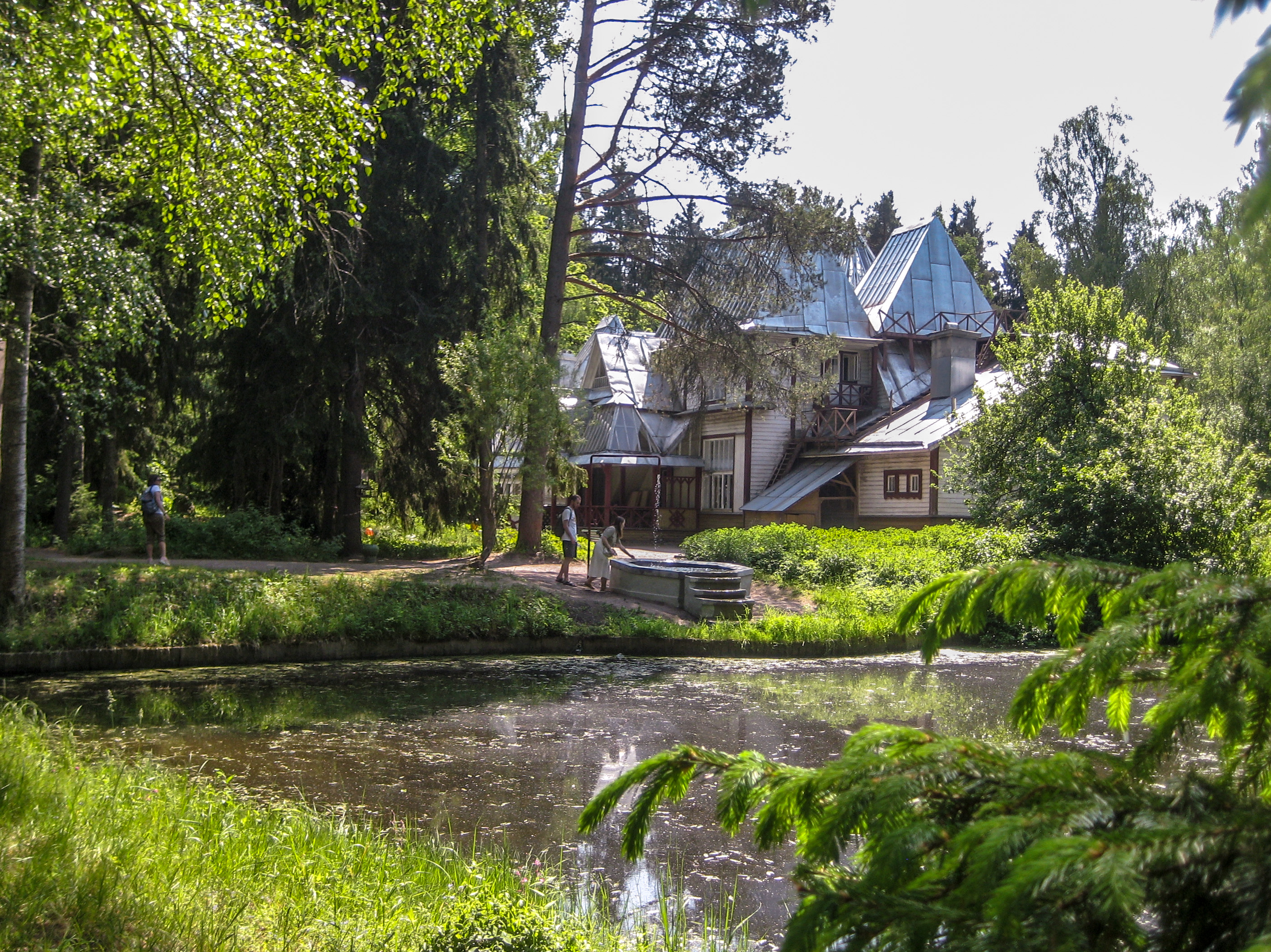
Penaty Estate of Ilya Repin

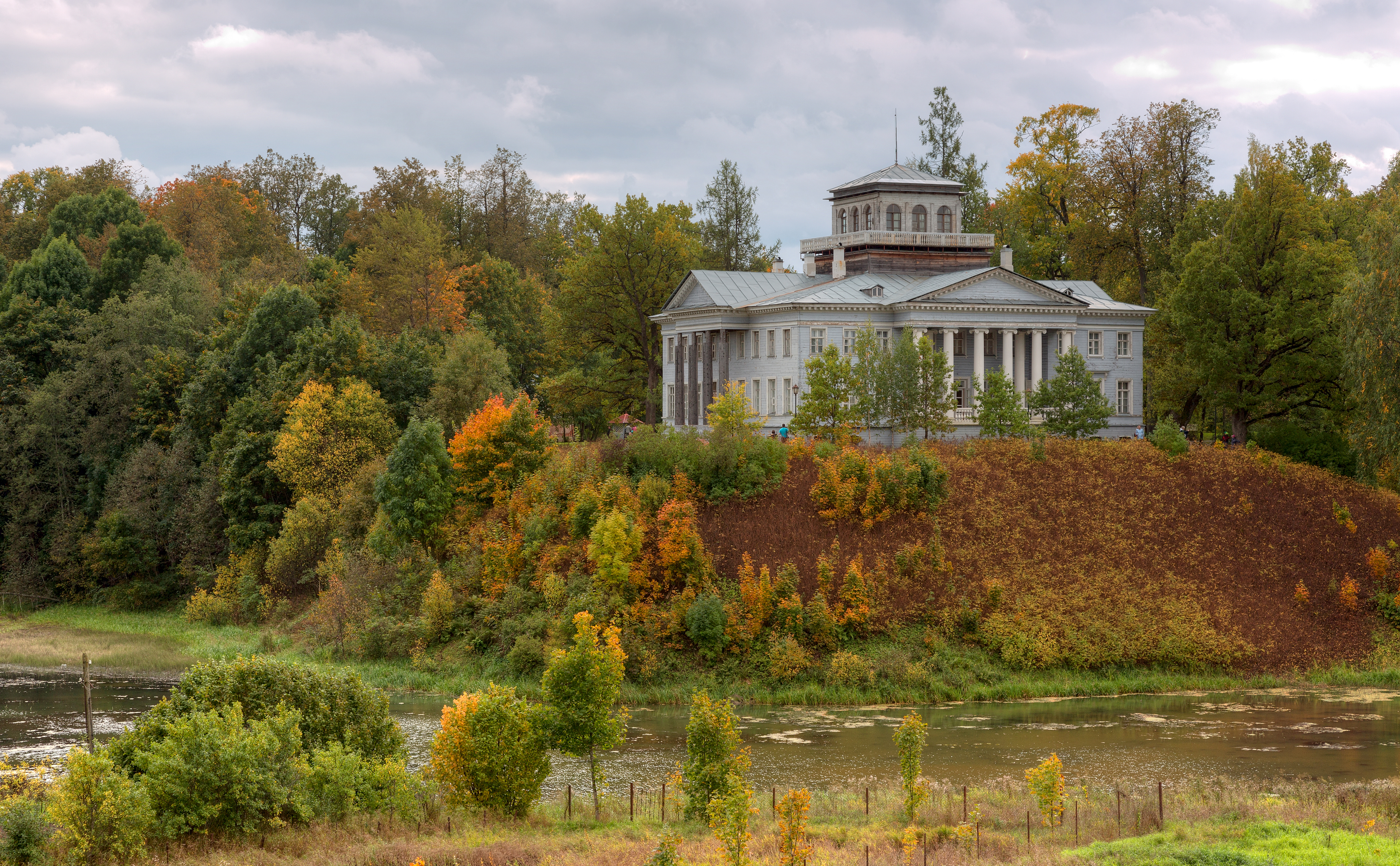
Rozhdestveno Estate of Vladimir Nabokov

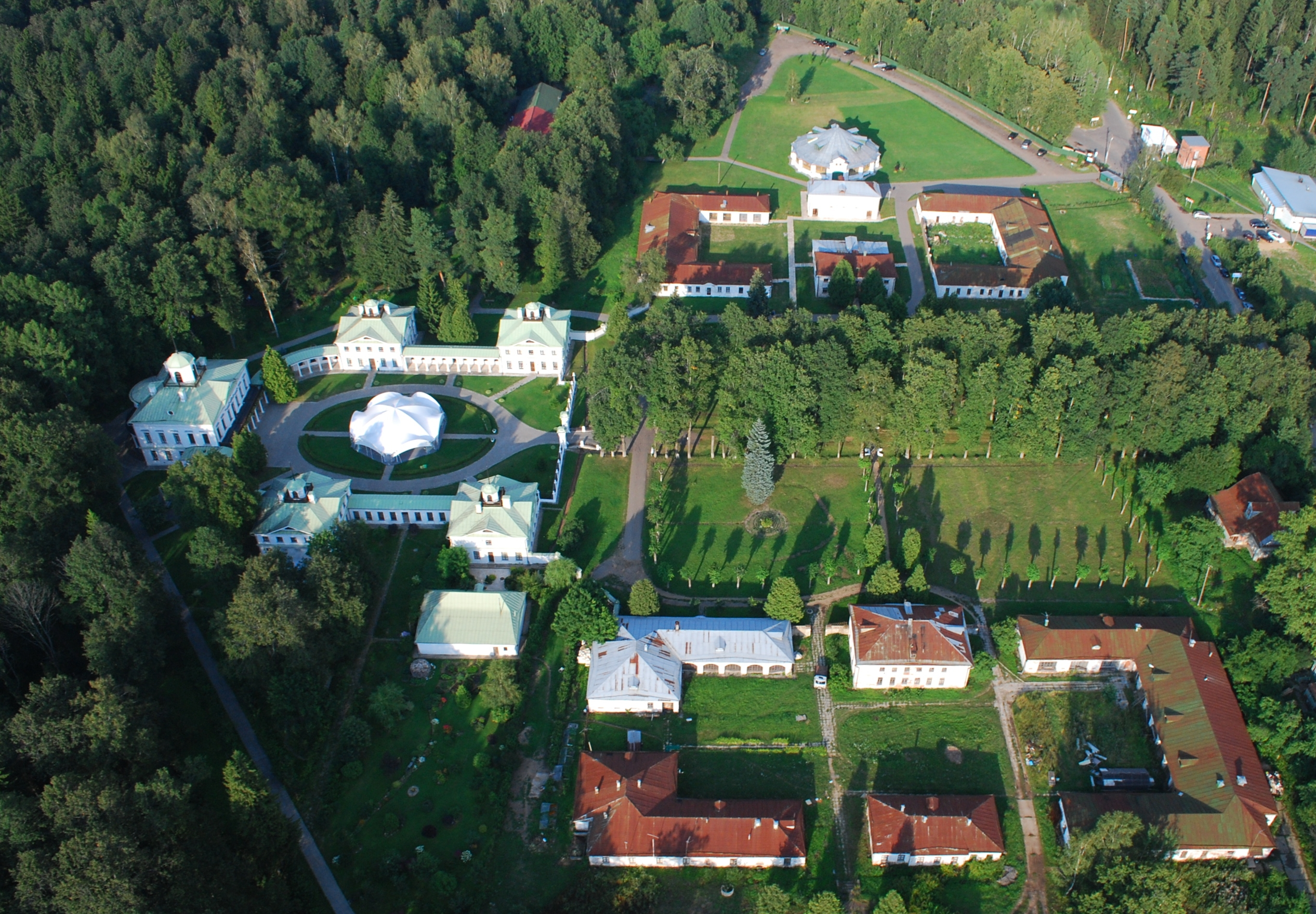
Serednikovo Estate of Vsevolozhsky and Stolypin

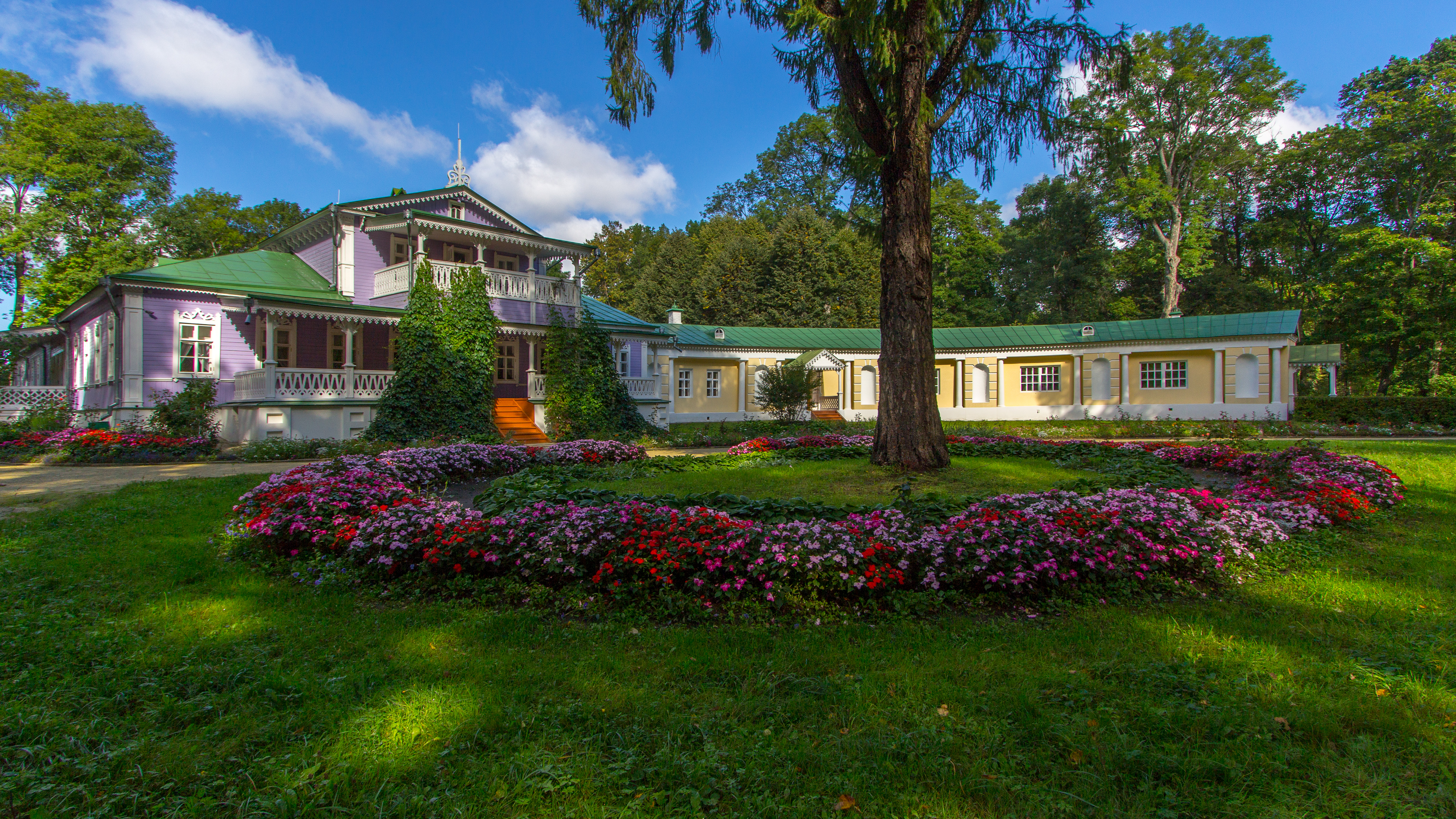
Spasskoye-Lutovinovo Estate of Ivan Turgenev

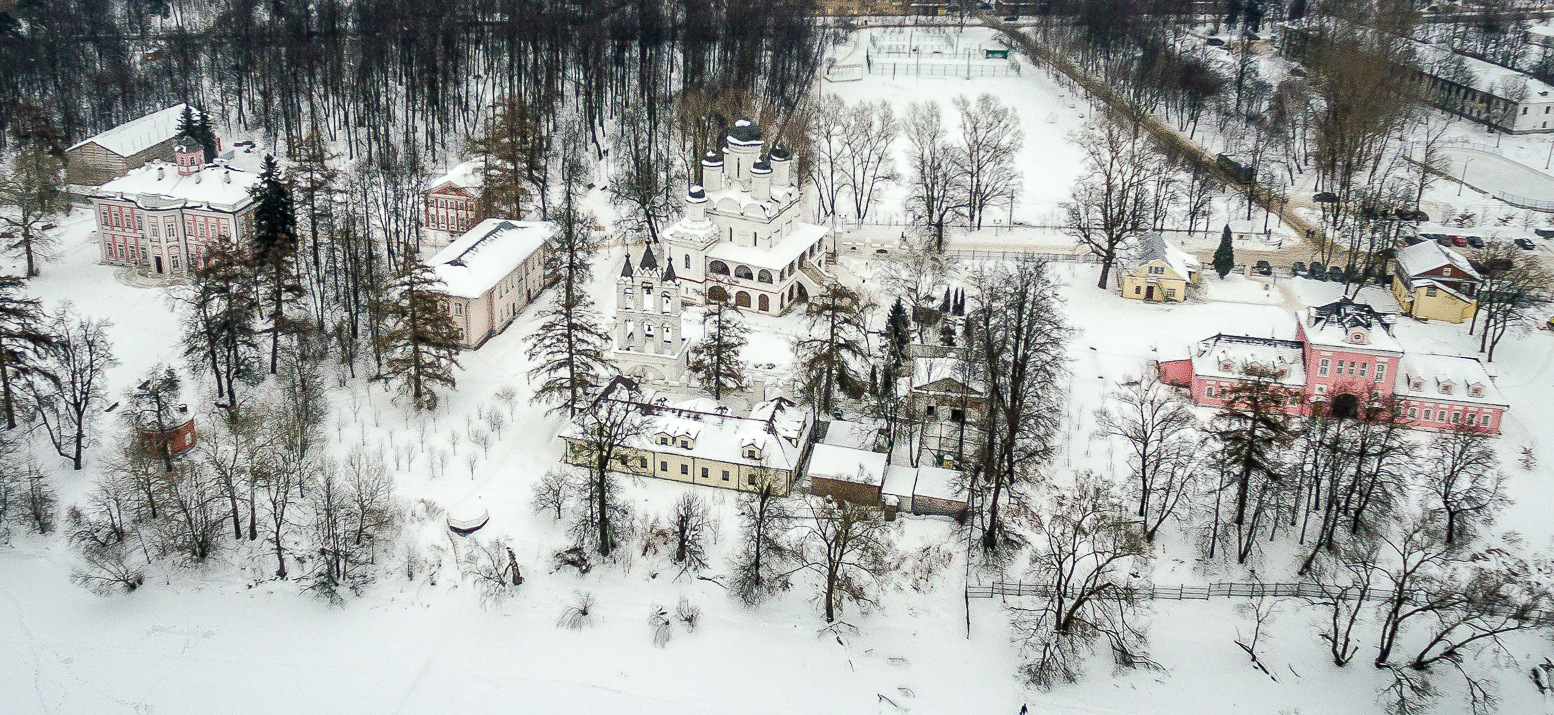
Vyazyomy Estate of Boris Godunov

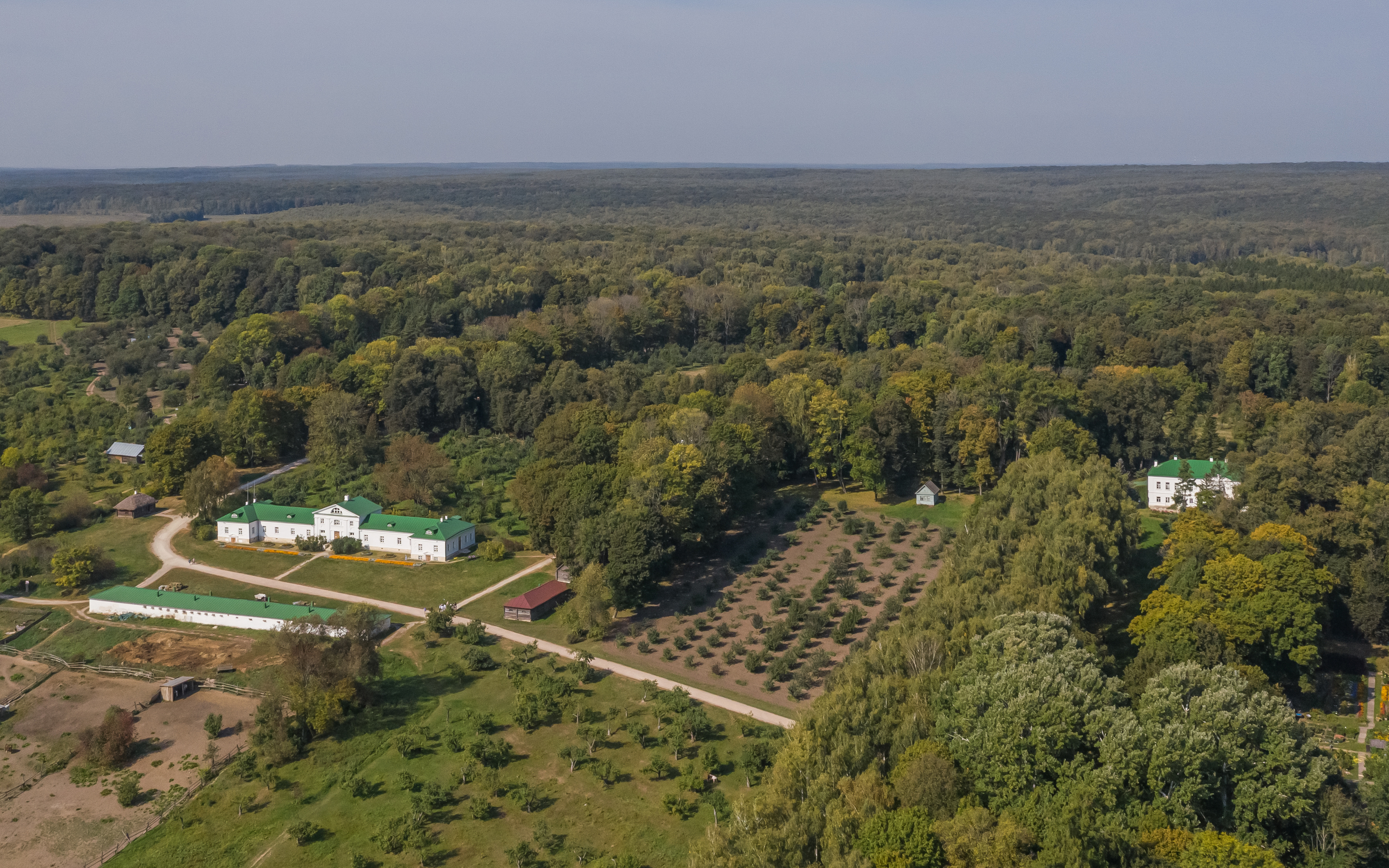
Yasnaya Polyana Estate of Leo Tolstoy

== See also ==
- Landed property
- Estate
- Folwark

Russian Estates

- Irkutsk Estates
- Estates near Moscow
- Smolensk Estates

== Literature ==
- Дмитриева Е. Е., Купцова О. Н. Жизнь усадебного мифа: Утраченный и обретенный рай. — М.: ОГИ, 2008. — 528 с. — ISBN 978-5-94282-466-2.
- Коробко М. Ю. Источники по истории русской усадебной культуры. — М.: Ясная поляна, 1997.
- Коробко М. Ю. Мир русской усадьбы // "История" : Газета издательского дома "Первое сентября". — 2003. — No. 34-35.
- Коробко М. Ю. Топонимические традиции русской усадьбы (1861–1917 гг.) // Русская усадьба : Сборник "Общества изучения русской усадьбы". — 2003. — No. 9.
- М. Харит «Новый век российской усадьбы». Популярная энциклопедия архитектуры. 2001–2015 г.г. Изд. Аст-Астрель. Москва ISBN 5-17-008120-0, ISBN 5-17-008120-0
- "Усадьба крестьянская". Российский гуманитарный энциклопедический словарь. Vol. 3: П—Я. Мoscow: Владос: Филологический факультет СПбГУ. 2002. ISBN 5-8465-0037-4.
- Шанский Н. М.; Иванов В. В.; Шанская Т. В. (1971). "Усадьба". In С. Г. Бархударова (ed.). Краткий этимологический словарь русского языка. Пособие для учителя. Мoscow: Просвещение.
