= Vsevolozhsky =

Vsevolozhsky (masculine), Vsevolozhskaya (feminine), or Vsevolozhskoye (neuter) may refer to:

- Vsevolozhsky family, a noble family of Rurikid stock
- Ivan Vsevolozhsky (1835–1909), director of the Imperial Theaters in Russia in 1881–1898
- Vsevolozhsky District, a district of Leningrad Oblast, Russia
- Vsevolozhskoye Urban Settlement, a municipal formation corresponding to Vsevolozhskoye Settlement Municipal Formation, an administrative division of Vsevolozhsky District of Leningrad Oblast, Russia
- Vsevolozhskoye, a suburban settlement, which was merged with four other suburban settlements into the urban-type settlement of Vsevolozhsky, later the town of Vsevolozhsk, Leningrad Oblast, Russia.
- Vsevolozhskaya railway station, main railway station in Vsevolozhsk, Leningrad Oblast, Russia
