= Rozhdestveno =

Rozhdestveno:

- Rozhdestveno (Moscow Metro)
- Rozhdestveno Memorial Estate
- Rozhdestveno (military airport)
- Rozhdestveno - settlements in Russia
