= Zherekhovo =

Zherekhovo Жерехово
- Selo
- Location within Vladimir Oblast Location within Russia
- Coordinates: 56°10′N 39°58′E
- Country: Russia
- Region: Vladimir Oblast
- District: Sobinsky District
- Time zone: UTC+3:00

Zherekhovo (Russian: Жерехово) is a rural locality (a selo) in Tolpukhovskoye Rural Settlement, Sobinsky District, Vladimir Oblast, Russia. As of 2010, the population of Zherekhovo was 357 as of 2010. Zherekhovo contains six streets.

== Geography ==
Zherekhovo is located 23 km north of Sobinka (the district's administrative centre) by road. Dobrynino is the nearest rural locality.

== History ==
Zherekhovo was granted to the Vsevolozhsky family by Tsar Michael in 1622.
