= Nabokov House =

House where Vladimir Nabokov was born

Coordinates: 59.9319°N 30.3048°E

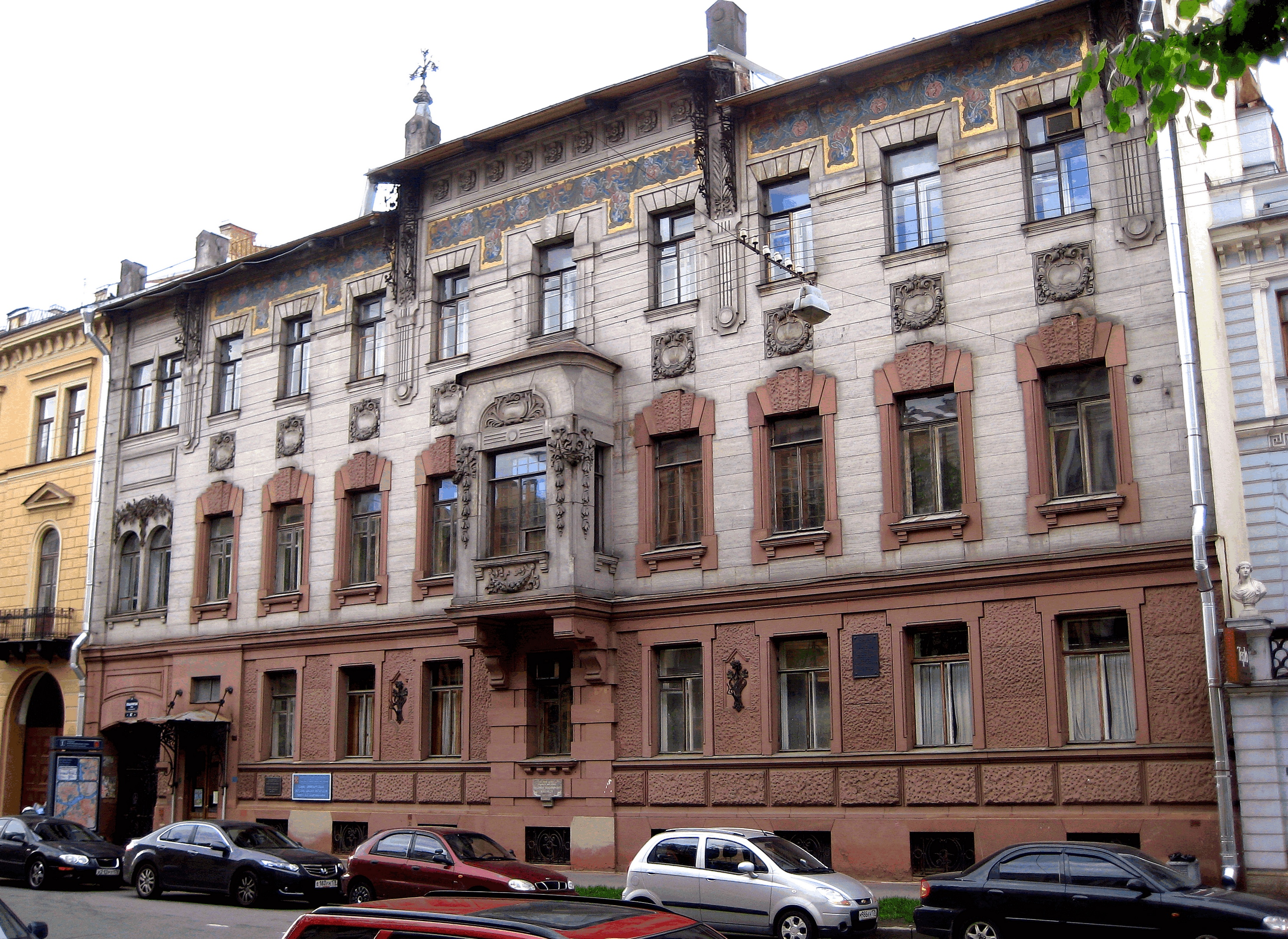
Nabokov House

Nabokov House is a house in Saint Petersburg with the modern street number of 47 Great Morskaya Street (Bol'shaia morskaia ulitsa), 190000. In 1897, the mansion became the property of the liberal statesman and jurist Vladimir Dmitrievich Nabokov, and as such the house hosted many important political meetings, including the final session of the National Congress of Zemstvos (1904).

It was also in this mansion that novelist Vladimir Nabokov was born in 1899. The first floor of the house contains the Nabokov Museum dedicated to the author's life.

== History of the house ==
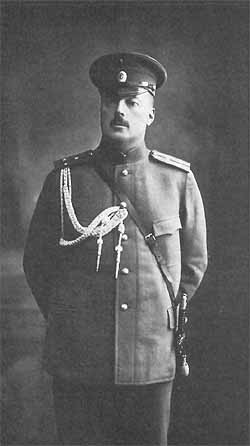
V. D. Nabokov, who became owner of the house in 1897

It is a medium to large townhouse that was built during the 19th century in the Neo-Renaissance style for the Polovtsev family.

Between 1897 and the October Revolution, the house was the property of the liberal statesman and jurist Vladimir Dmitrievich Nabokov, who had obtained it as a dowry of Elena Rukavishnikova. As such, it became host to many political meetings, particularly in the lead up and following the first Russian Revolution of 1905. It was in this house that the final session of the National Congress of Zemstvos was hosted in 1904.

The house is also notable for being the home of Vladimir Vladimirovich, who lived in the house until November 1917. The house is meticulously described in his autobiography The Other Shores and Speak, Memory. For Vladimir, the house remained the only house in the world.

A close childhood friend of Olga Nabokova was Ayn Rand (Alisa Rosenbaum). As children, the two would engage in endless political debates in this house; while Nabokova defended constitutional monarchy, Rand supported republican ideals.

The house was broken into by Bolshevik revolutionaries during the October Revolution (1917).

=== Nabokov Museum ===
Since April 1998, the first floor of the house is occupied by the Nabokov Museum, and the upper two stories are occupied by the offices of the newspaper Nevskoe Vremya. In the museum space are the Phone room, Dining room, Library, Committee Room (where most of the meetings of the Constitutional Democratic party were held) and the Kitchen.

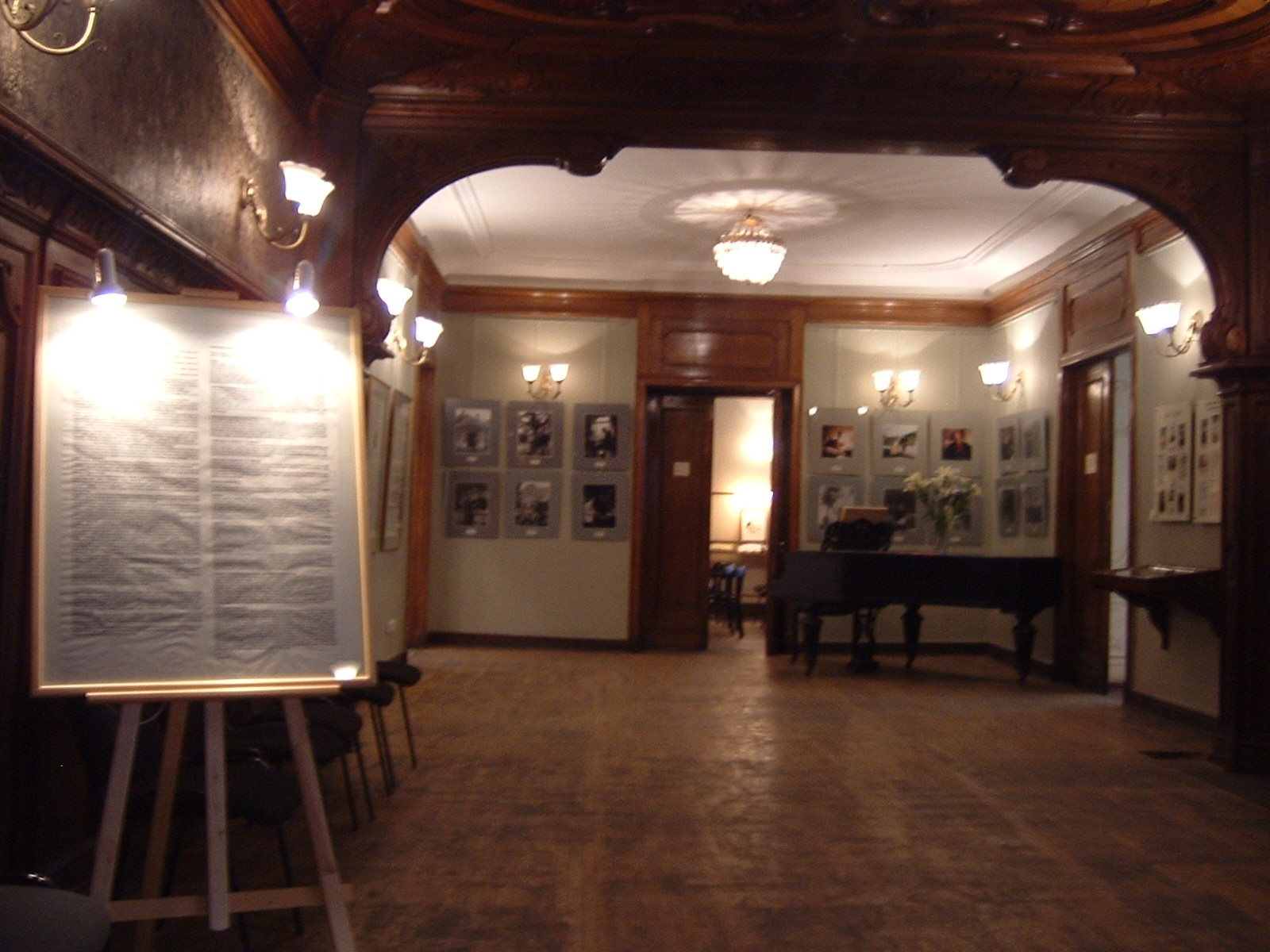
Inside Nabokov's House

Very little has remained from the Nabokov family's life in the house. Time and history spared nothing except the interiors of several rooms on the first and second floors of the building and the old stained-glass window above the flight of stairs leading to the third floor.

Nabokov memorabilia, including Vladimir Nabokov's personal effects (index cards, pencils, eyeglasses, Scrabble game), as well as books and other objects connected to his life and art, form the core of the museum's collection. The museum is dedicated to fostering Nabokov's memory and his artistic legacy and cultural values, both within Russia and internationally. The museum houses exhibits related to Nabokov's life and milieu and provides a research library for Nabokov scholars, and also holds many events and activities inspired by Nabokov: readings of works by Nabokov and those he admired (such as Chekhov and Joyce), lectures, international or single-nation conferences ("Nabokov and Russia," "Nabokov and England," "Nabokov and France," "Nabokov and Germany," "Nabokov and the United States"), an annual international Nabokov summer school, and exhibitions and installations related to Nabokov. Its activities have the regular support of leading Nabokov scholars from around the world.

=== Vandalism in 2013 ===
- A series of threatening letters were sent to the museum, threatening staff whether 'they are afraid of the wrath of God for the promotion of the pedophile Nabokov'.
- On the night of January 10, 2013, unknown vandals broke the windows of the Museum, throwing into the house a bottle with a note containing threats and insults. A few days later, Artyom Suslov, the organizer of the play 'Lolita', was also severely beaten up in Saint Petersburg, with a video released on the internet of the beating, in which Suslov was made to confess to promoting pedophilia.
- On the night of 29 January 2013, vandals defaced the wall of the Museum with the word "pedophile". Law enforcement authorities later initiated a criminal case under Art. 214 of the Russian Criminal Code to investigate the defacement of the museum.
- On 20 February 2013, vandals attacked the Nabokov Rozhdestveno Memorial Estate

=== Museum info ===
- 190000, St.Petersburg # 47 Bol'shaya Morskaya

The museum is open daily from 11 a.m. to 6 p.m., Saturday and Sunday from 12 p.m. to 5 p.m., and closed Monday.

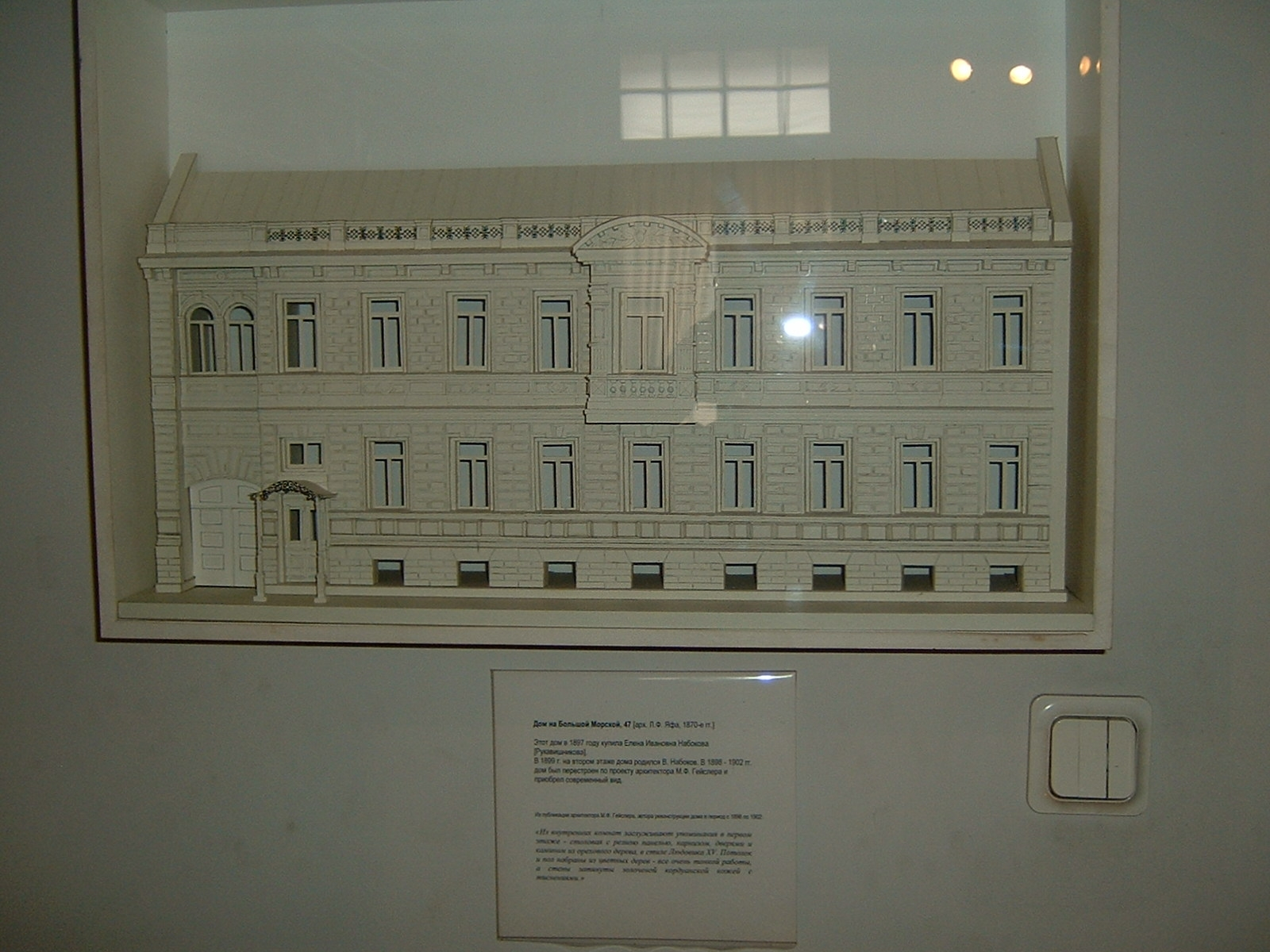
Model of Nabokov's House

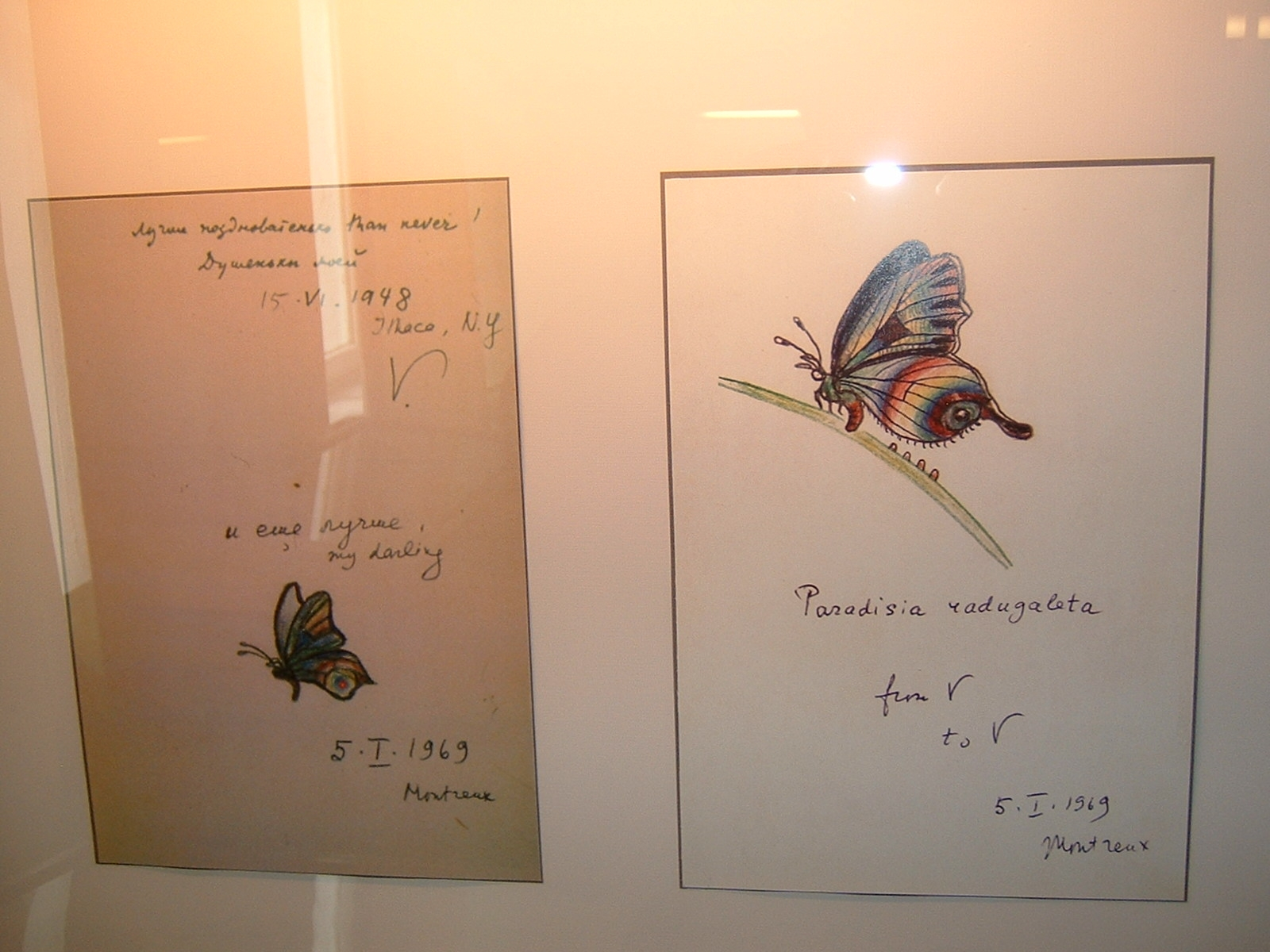
Butterflies drawn by Nabokov for his wife

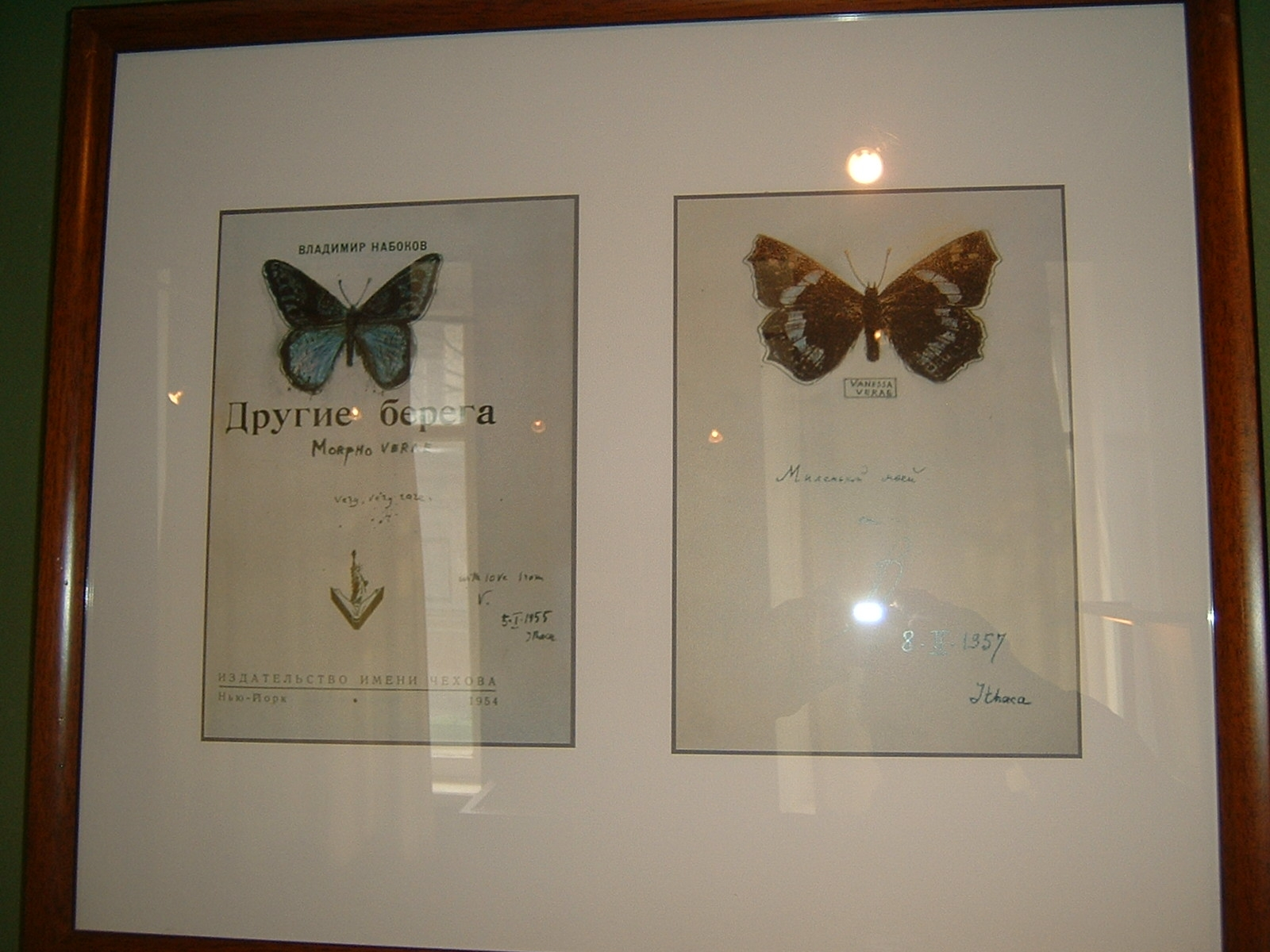
Butterflies collected by Nabokov on his book The other shores

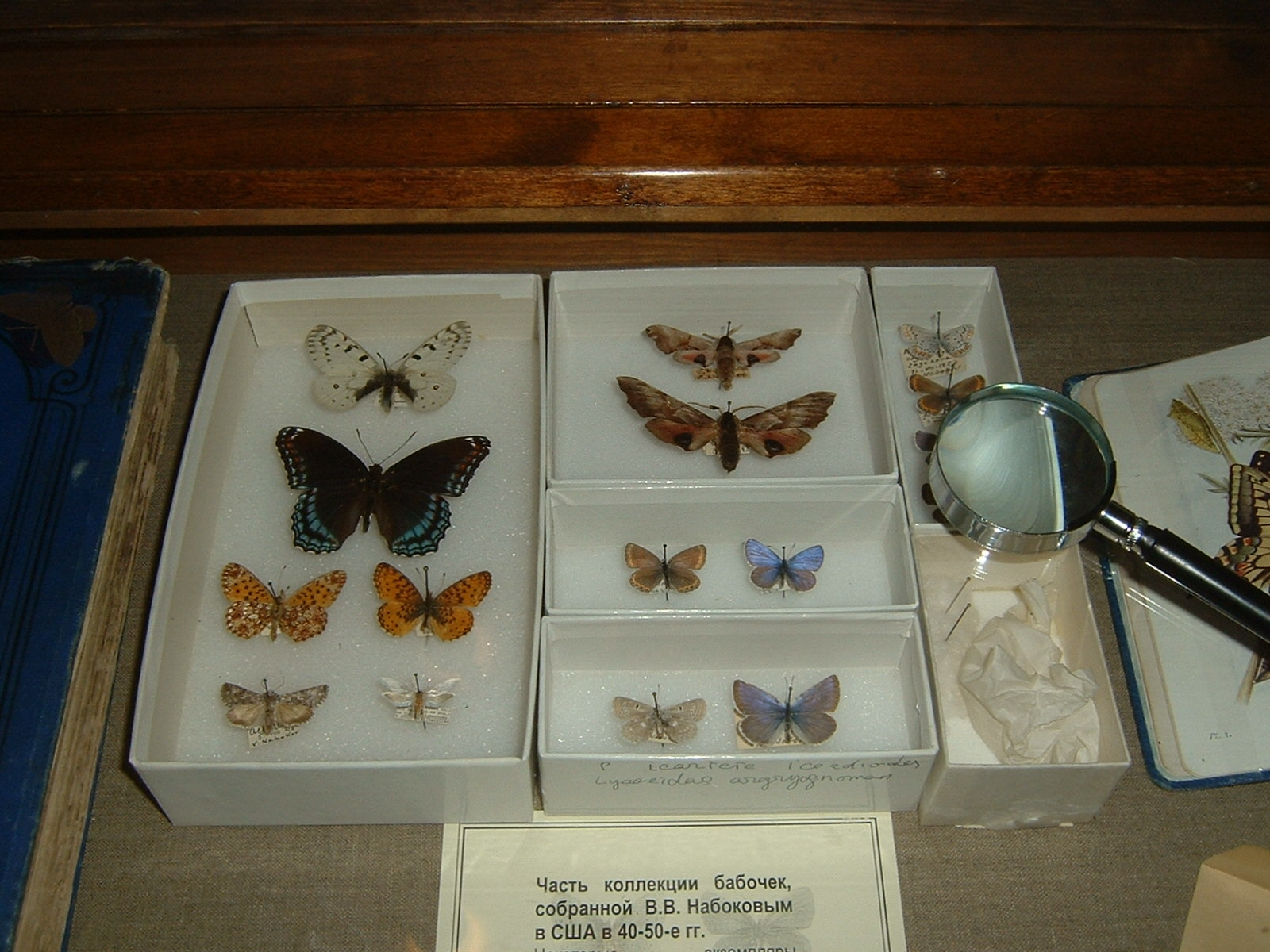
Butterflies collected by Nabokov

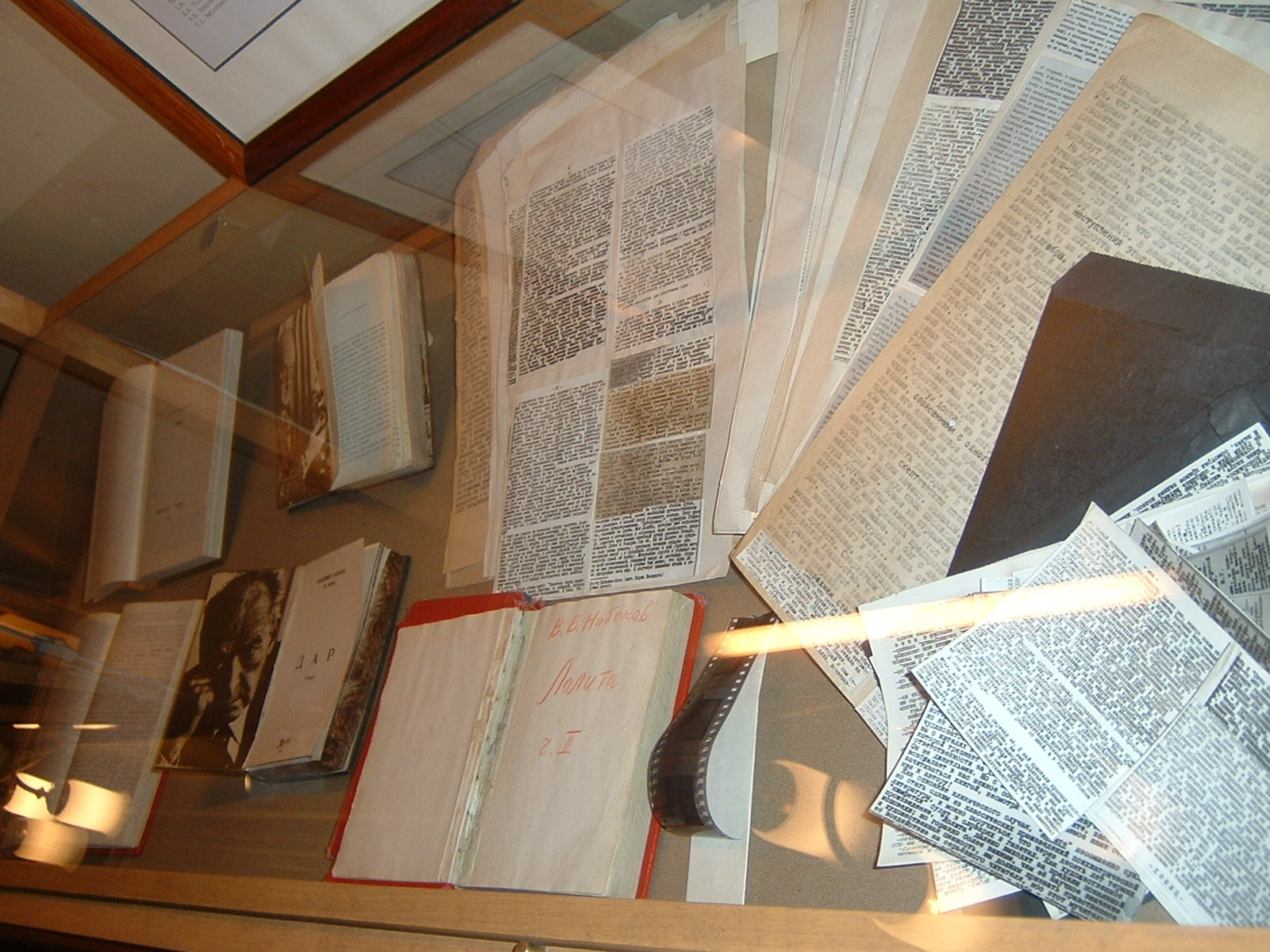
Samizdat books by Nabokov made in Russia

== See also ==
- List of museums in Saint Petersburg
