= Maryino Estate =

Estate near St. Petersburg, Russia

- Марьино
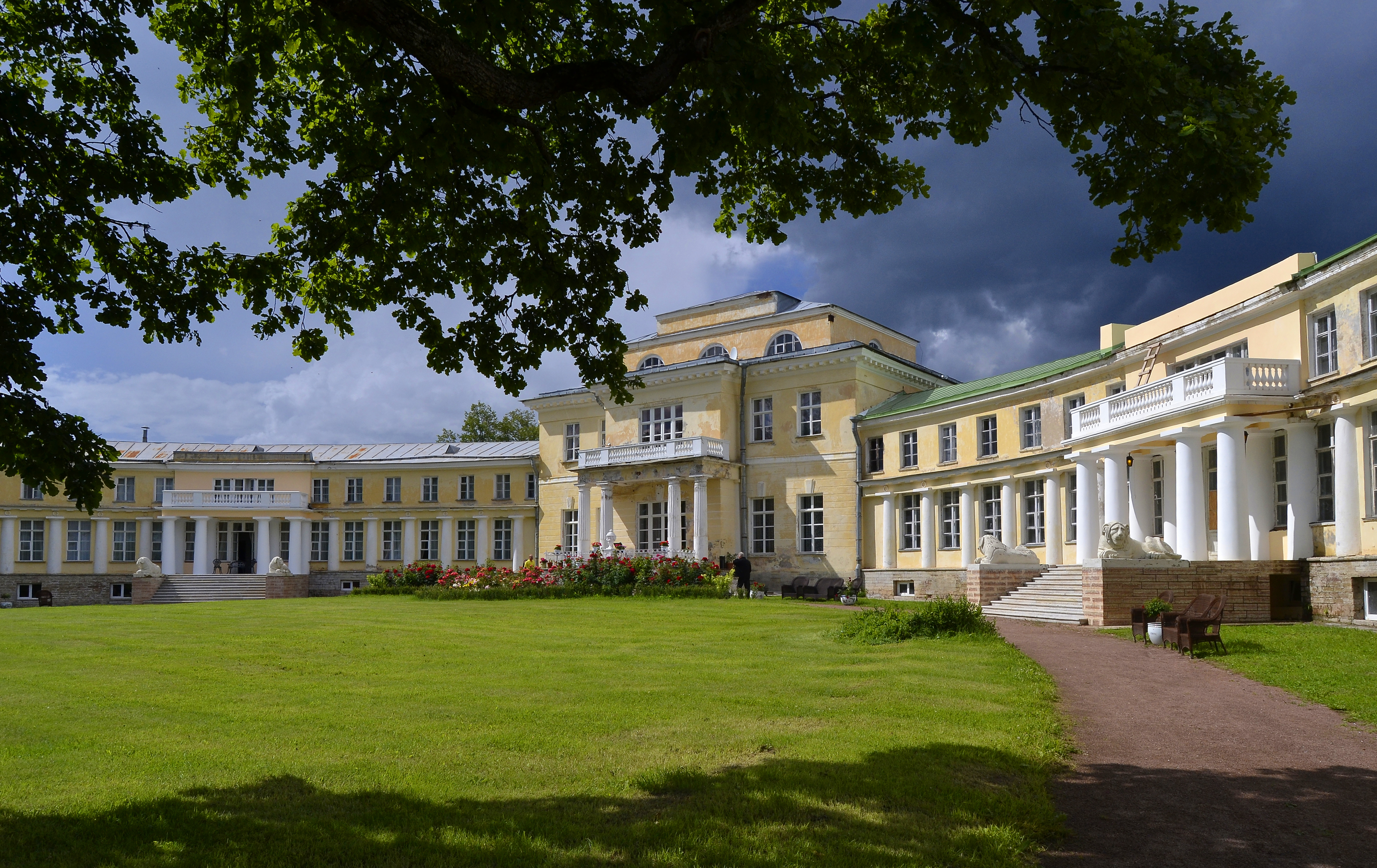
- Interactive map of Maryino Estate
- Location: Adrianovo, Leningrad Oblast, Russia
- Type: Estate
- Beginning date: 1813
- Completion date: 1845
- Dedicated to: Stroganov family

Maryino Estate (Russian: Марьино) is the estate originally belonging to the wealthy Russian Stroganov family. The estate was built in the early 1800s, and is located in Tosnensky District in Leningrad Oblast, not far from St. Petersburg.

== History ==
In 1726, on the lands belonging to Grigory Stroganov, which was then inherited by his widow Marya Stroganova (née Novosiltsova). The estate soon began construction, and was eventually named in her honor.

Since 1799, the estate, which was part of the Stroganov family majorat, became the property of Count Pavel Stroganov, and then after 1817, belonged to his widow Sophie Stroganova (née Princess Golitsyna, 1775-1845). Sophie was responsible for managing the estate, and many who worked for her received education funded by her in other European countries.

In 1814-1817, the manor house was rebuilt in Neoclassical style under the direction of architect Ivan Kolodin, who designed an English garden and a number of pavilions. The process also included architects like H. Meyer, Adam Menelaws, and Peter Sadovnikov.

In 1825, an agricultural school was founded in Maryino, where 50 peasant orphans were sent from the Stroganov estates in Perm for training. The Russian botanist Alexander Teploukhov also conducted some of his experiments in Maryino.

Since 1845, Maryino Estate was owned by Princess Adelaide (Aglaya Pavlovna Golitsyna, 1799-1882), a lady-in-waiting and recipient of the Order of Saint Catherine. In 1886, the estate passed to her grandson, Prince Pavel Golitsyn, who owned it until 1914. Afterwards, the property passed to his son Sergei, but not long before Maryino became public property after the Bolshevik Revolution in 1917.

In the following years, the estate served several different purposes, including housing a museum, a sanatorium for members of the Russian Academy of Sciences, an orphanage, a boarding house, and a military plant.

Since 2008, the Maryino estate has been under the ownership of Galina Georgievna Stepanova.

Outside the entrances are several lion statues, including one pair of Medici lions.

== Gallery ==
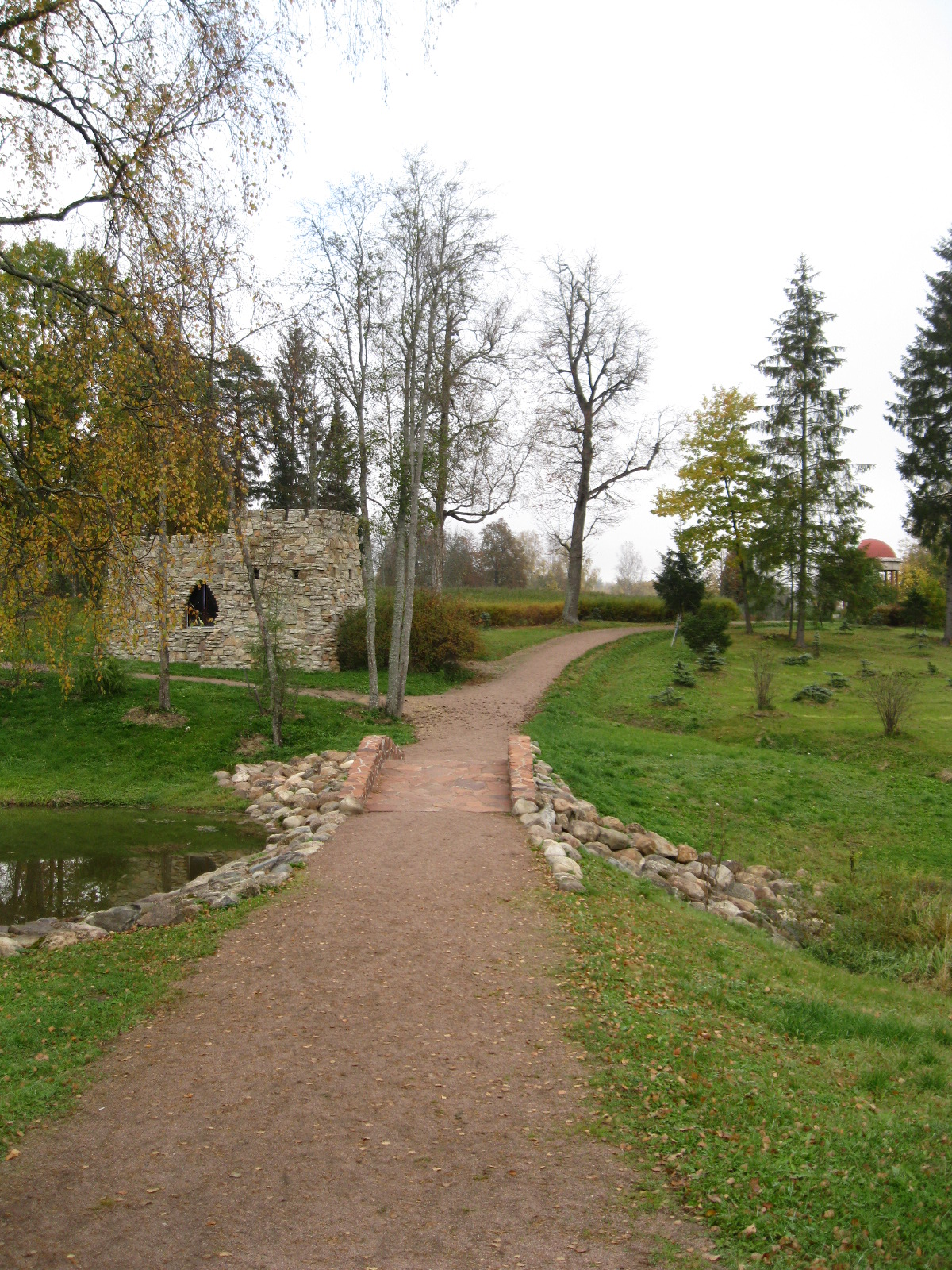

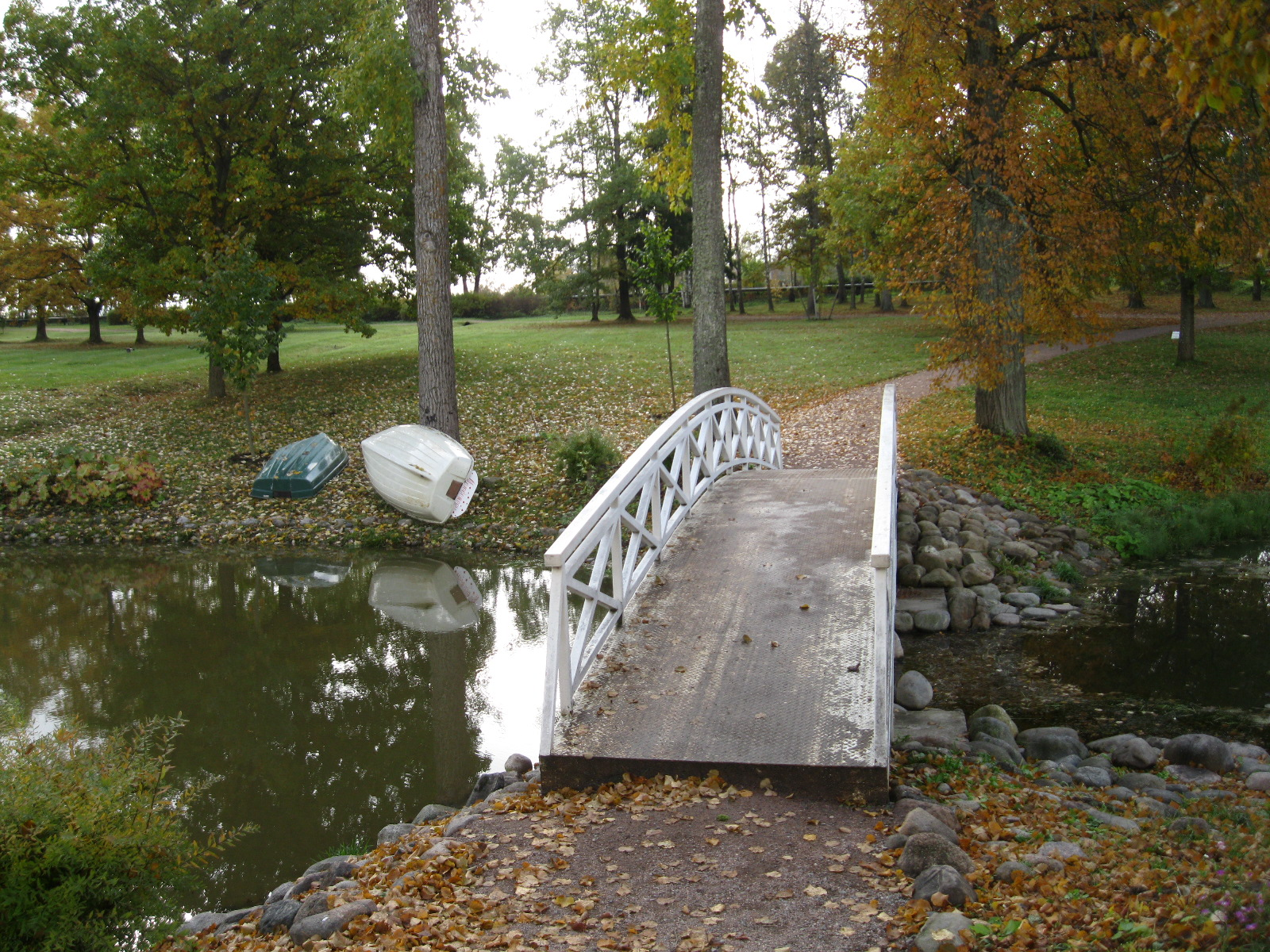

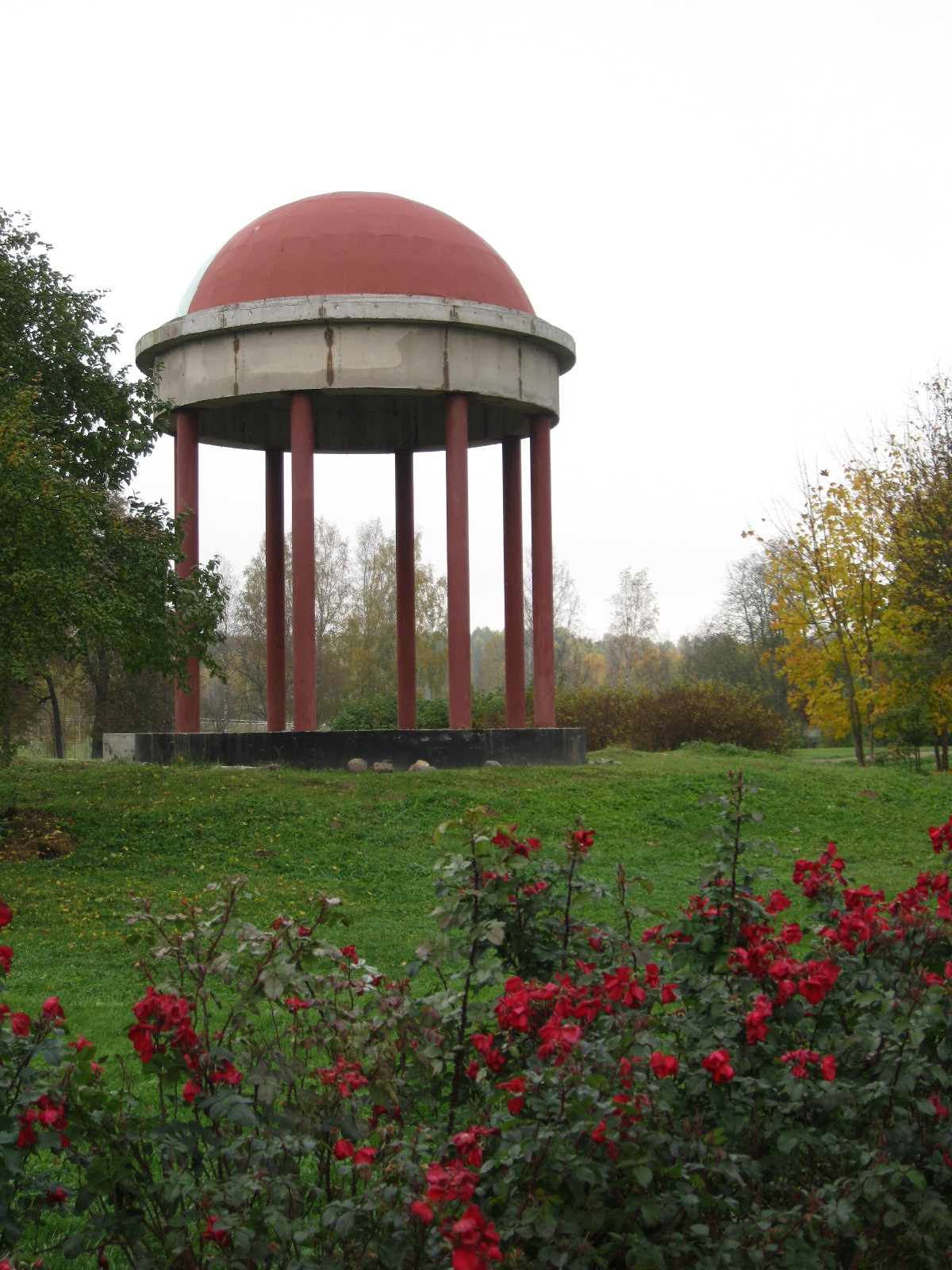

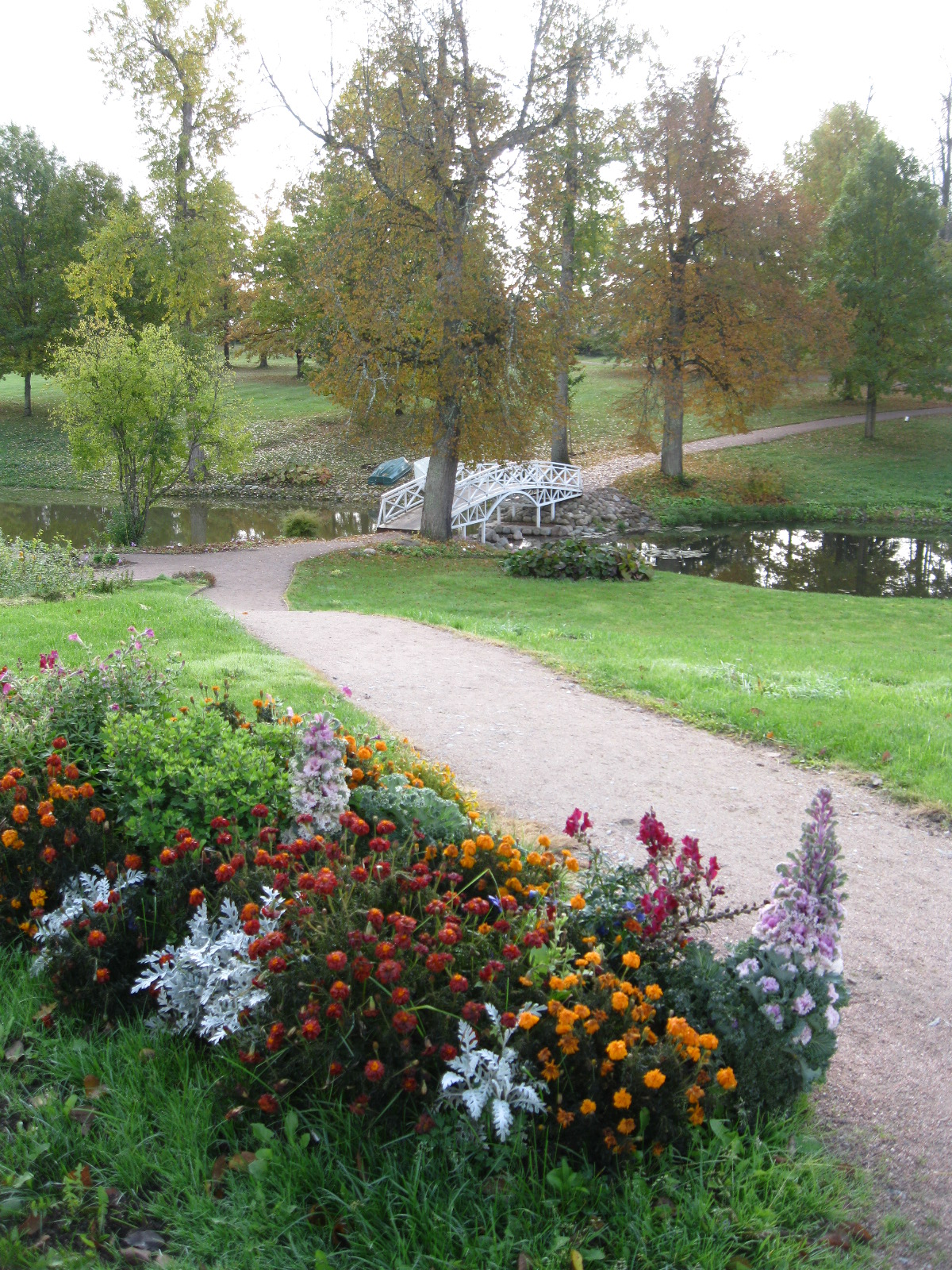

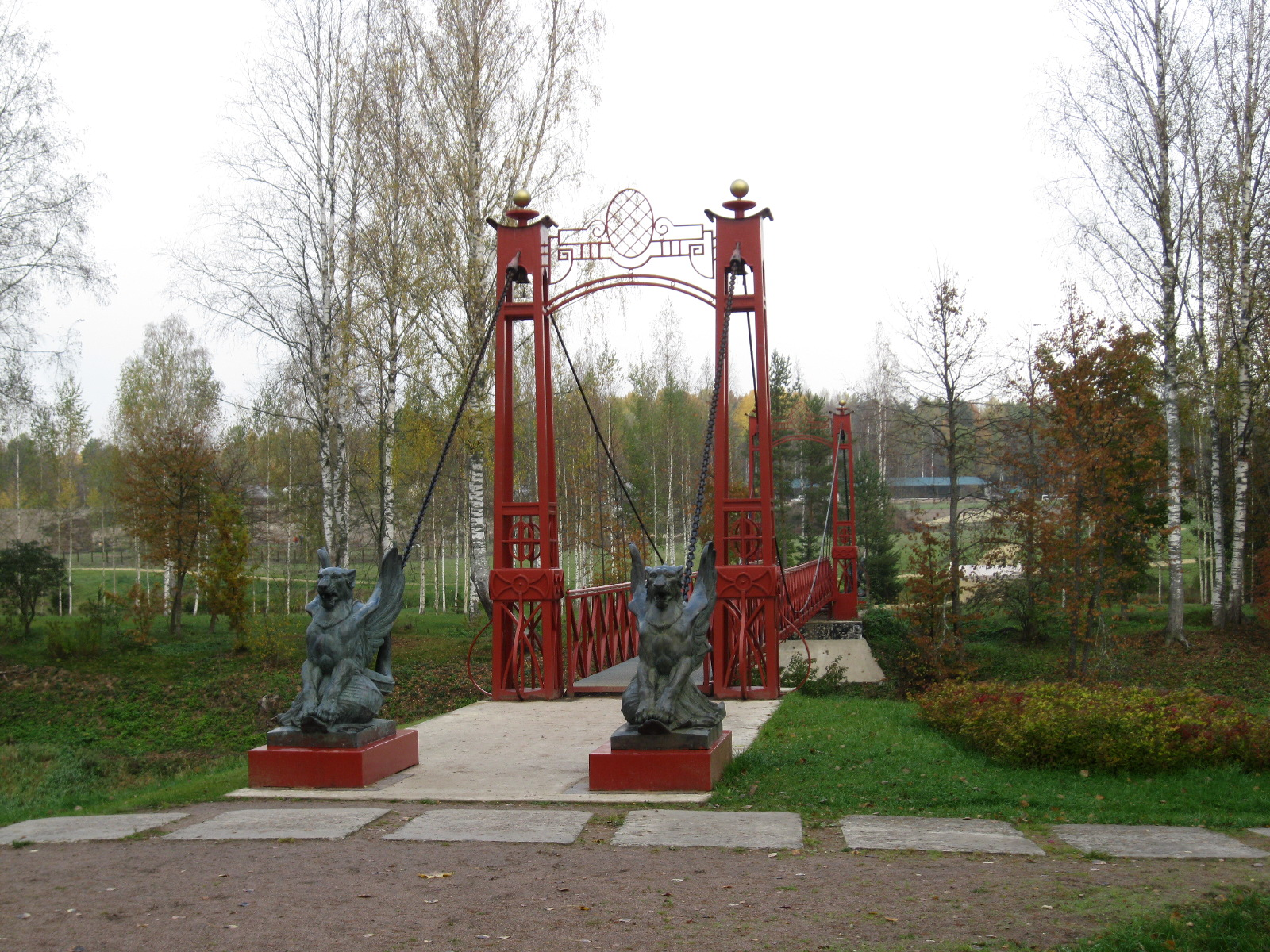

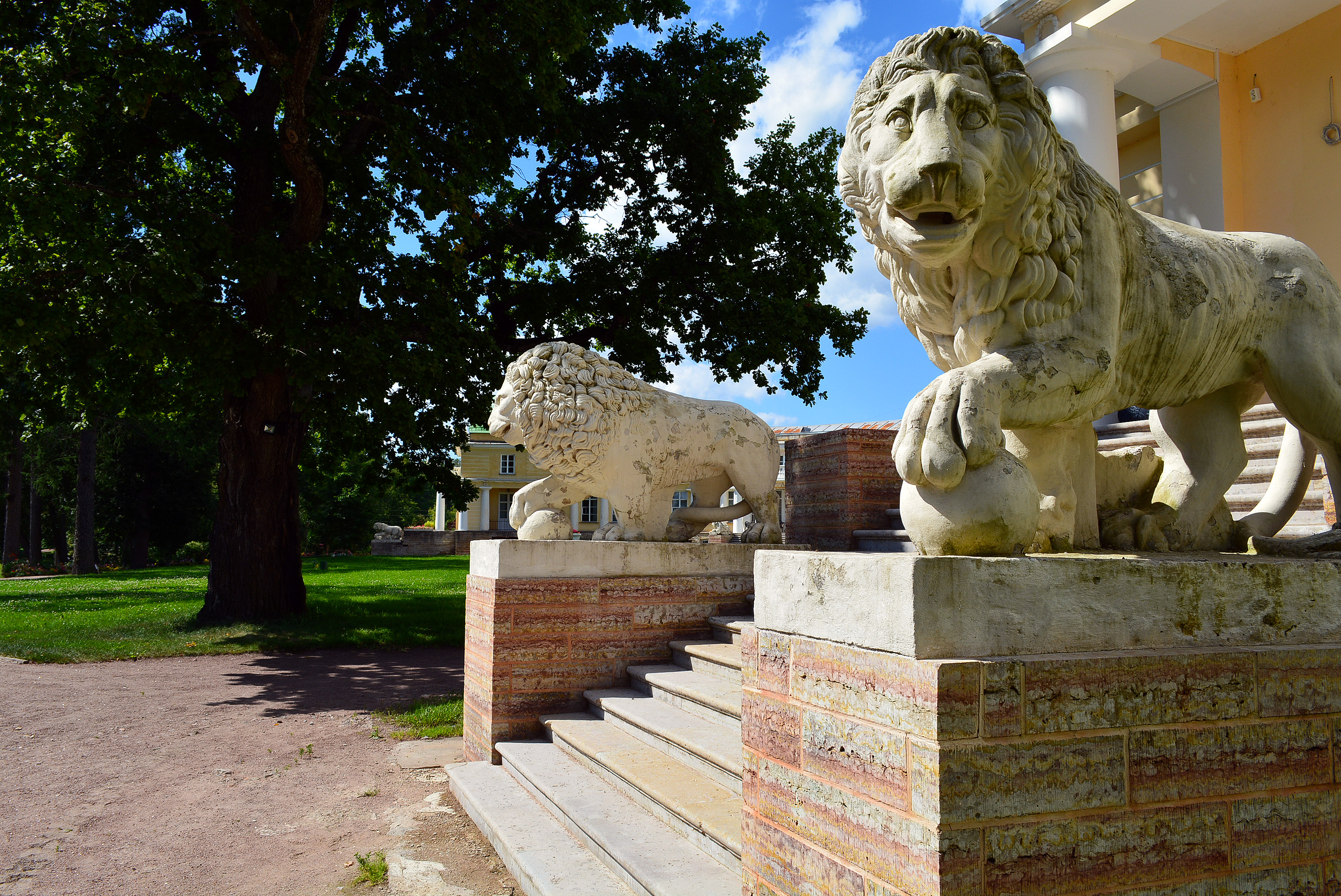
