= Rozhdestveno Memorial Estate =

Estate and museum in Russia

Coordinates: 59°19′01″N 29°56′46″E

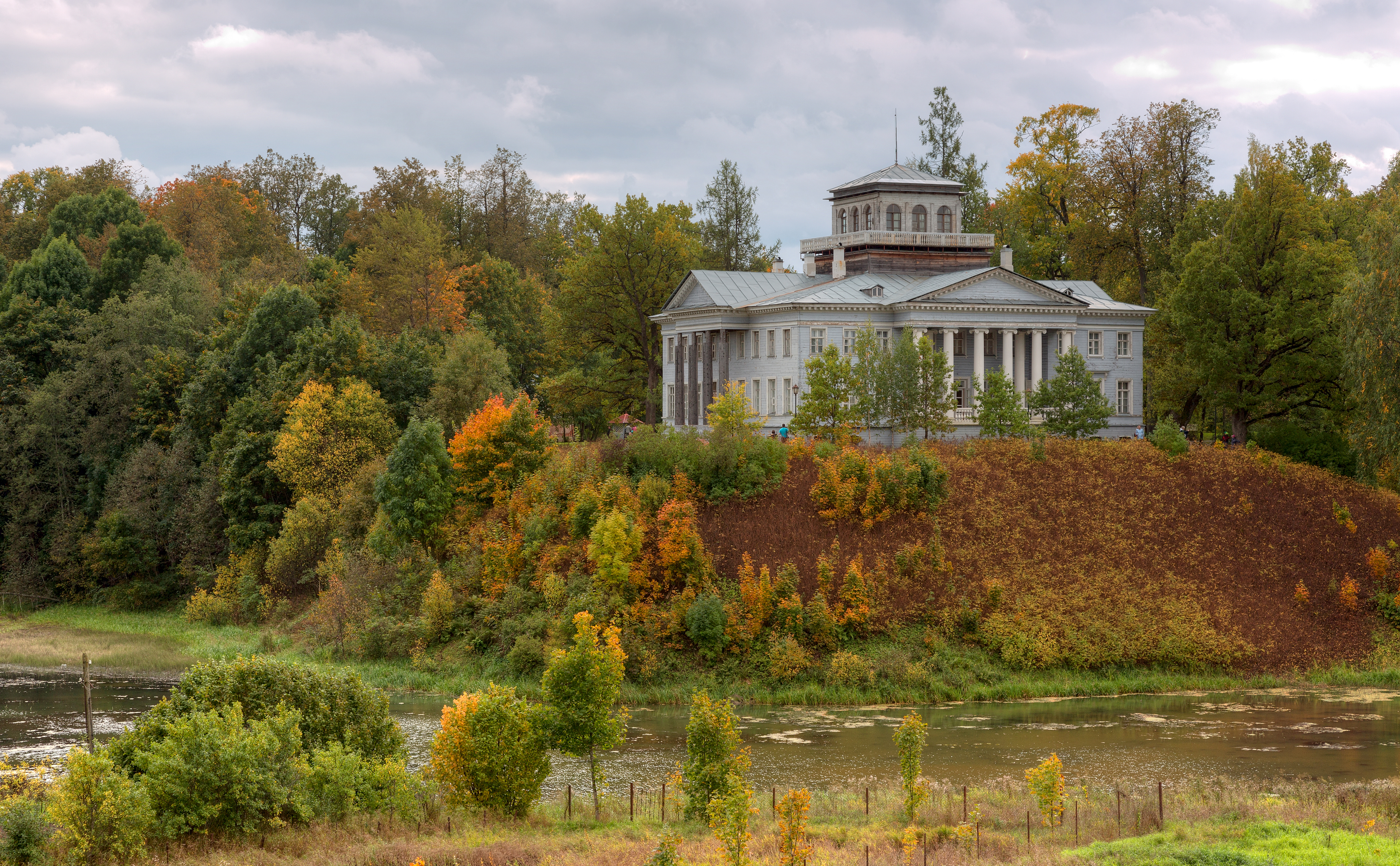
Nabokov inherited the estate from his uncle in 1916

The Rozhdestveno Memorial Estate (Russian: [rɐʐˈdʲestvʲɪnə]) is a writer's house museum and park near Siverskaya, Gatchinsky District, Leningrad Oblast, that commemorates the most famous owner of the estate, Vladimir Nabokov; the Batovo and Vyra estates, also immortalized by Nabokov, are nearby. As Nabokov spent part of his youth at Vyra, he visited his grandmother at Batovo and his uncle at Rozhdestveno. The Batovo mansion burned down in 1925 and Vyra was destroyed in 1944, leaving Rozhdestveno as the sole survivor of the triad of estates owned by the Nabokov family.

The estate is named after the Rozhdestva Bogoroditsy Church (Church of the Nativity of Our Lady). The mansion, designed in the Italian style, displays six Ionic columns supporting the main facade. The roof is crowned by a rectangular belvedere. Inside, the large center hall was used for balls and formal receptions. While rooms on the ground floor served for official functions, rooms on the second floor contained the actual living quarters. The kitchen and other household facilities were located in the basement. Stables and other estate buildings are nearby. During the nineteenth century the estate was acquired by Nabokov's grandfather Ivan Rukavishnikov. It was inherited by his son, Vasiliy Ivanovich Rukavishnikov, in 1901. "Uncle Ruka" died in 1916 and bequeathed the estate along with "what would amount nowadays to a couple of million dollars" to his nephew Vladimir Nabokov. Nabokov did not enjoy his property for long. In 1917, during the revolution, he left the Leningrad area in 1917 never to see the villa again.

The museum did not start as a memorial to Nabokov, when, in 1957, it began as a venue to show the local history, and was then converted into a museum of a local collective farm named after Lenin. With the presentation of photos from Nabokov's cook the former estate owners entered the picture. In 1974 the "Museum of Local History and Tradition" moved to the manor, and ten years later it was transformed into the "Rozhdestveno Historic Literary and Memorial Museum of Vladimir Nabokov". Nabokov readings started in 1988, and the Nabokov Room was opened in 1992. Significant damage was done by a fire in 1995. While the museum commemorates Nabokov it also displays the life of Russian nobility and of the common people of the area from the final years of Imperial Russia.

== Vandalism ==
- On the 20 February 2013, vandals attacked the Nabokov Rozhdestveno Memorial Estate for promoting pedophilia. This followed a series of incidents in Saint Petersburg, in which the Nabokov house was attacked and a producer of a play based on his work was beaten.

== See also ==
- Nabokov House
