= Ivan Rukavishnikov (gold miner) =

Russian mining engineer

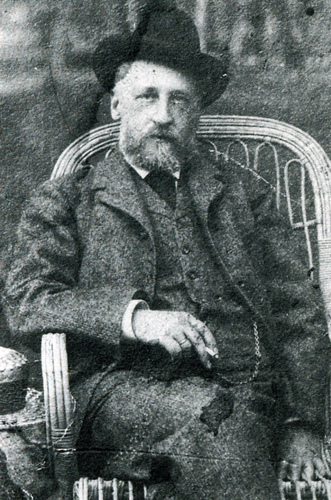
- Born: 1843; Kazan
- Died: 1901 (aged 57–58)

Ivan Vasilyevich Rukavishnikov (Russian: Иван Васильевич Рукавишников; 1843–1901) was a mining engineer, gold-miner, one of the co-owners of Lena Gold Mining Partnership. He was the grandfather of the notable writer Vladimir Nabokov. He was from the Russian Empire.

== Biography ==
Ivan Rukavishnikov was born in Kazan into an Old Believer family.

He graduated from the Physics and Mathematics Faculty of Moscow University and the Faculty of Law of St. Petersburg University.

== Awards ==
He was awarded the Order of Saint Vladimir.
