= Vsevolozhsky family =

Russian aristocratic family

The Vsevolozhsky family was a Russian aristocratic family descended from the Rostislavichi of Smolensk.

The family was granted Zherekhovo, a village in Vladimir by Tsar Michael in 1622.
