= Bolotsky =

Bolotsky (Russian: Болотский) is the name of the following rural localities in Vladimir Oblast, Russia:

- Bolotsky, Kovrovsky District, Vladimir Oblast, a village in Ivanovskoye Rural Settlement of Kovrovsky District
- Bolotsky, Sudogodsky District, Vladimir Oblast, a village in Andreyevskoye Rural Settlement of Sudogodsky District
