= Dorofeyevo =

Dorofeyevo Дорофеево
- Village
- Location within Vladimir Oblast Location within Russia
- Coordinates: 56°02′N 40°52′E
- Country: Russia
- Region: Vladimir Oblast
- District: Sudogodsky District
- Time zone: UTC+3:00

Dorofeyevo (Russian: Дорофеево) is a rural locality (a village) in Lavrovskoye Rural Settlement, Sudogodsky District, Vladimir Oblast, Russia. The population was 38 as of 2010. There are 3 streets.

== Geography ==
Dorofeyevo is located 13 km north of Sudogda (the district's administrative centre) by road. Myzino is the nearest rural locality.
