= Bolshaya Kozlovka =

Bolshaya Kozlovka Большая Козловка
- Village
- Location within Vladimir Oblast Location within Russia
- Coordinates: 55°57′N 41°02′E
- Country: Russia
- Region: Vladimir Oblast
- District: Sudogodsky District
- Time zone: UTC+3:00

Bolshaya Kozlovka (Russian: Большая Козловка) is a rural locality (a village) in Andreyevskoye Rural Settlement, Sudogodsky District, Vladimir Oblast, Russia. The population was 2 as of 2010.

== Geography ==
Bolshaya Kozlovka is located 13 km east of Sudogda (the district's administrative centre) by road. Malaya Kozlovka is the nearest rural locality.
