= Trofimovka =

Trofimovka Трофимовка
- Village
- Location within Vladimir Oblast Location within Russia
- Coordinates: 56°09′N 40°51′E
- Country: Russia
- Region: Vladimir Oblast
- District: Sudogodsky District
- Time zone: UTC+3:00

Trofimovka (Russian: Трофимовка) is a rural locality (a village) in Lavrovskoye Rural Settlement, Sudogodsky District, Vladimir Oblast, Russia. The population was 11 as of 2010.

== Geography ==
Trofimovka is located on the Klyazma River, 31 km north of Sudogda (the district's administrative centre) by road. Kiselnitsa is the nearest rural locality.
