= Posyolok Lnozavoda =

Posyolok Lnozavoda Посёлок Льнозавода
- Settlement
- Location within Vladimir Oblast Location within Russia
- Coordinates: 55°57′N 40°29′E
- Country: Russia
- Region: Vladimir Oblast
- District: Sudogodsky District
- Time zone: UTC+3:00

Posyolok Lnozavoda (Russian: Посёлок Льнозавода) is a rural locality (a settlement) in Golovinskoye Rural Settlement, Sudogodsky District, Vladimir Oblast, Russia. The population was 34 as of 2010.

== Geography ==
It is located 3 km east from Golovino, 25 km west from Sudogda.
