= Korostelikha =

Korostelikha Коростелиха
- Village
- Location within Vladimir Oblast Location within Russia
- Coordinates: 55°58′N 40°46′E
- Country: Russia
- Region: Vladimir Oblast
- District: Sudogodsky District
- Time zone: UTC+3:00

Korostelikha (Russian: Коростелиха) is a rural locality (a village) in Muromtsevskoye Rural Settlement, Sudogodsky District, Vladimir Oblast, Russia. The population was 4 as of 2010.

== Geography ==
Korostelikha is located 7 km northwest of Sudogda (the district's administrative centre) by road. Penki is the nearest rural locality.
