= Burlygino =

Burlygino Бурлыгино
- Village
- Location within Vladimir Oblast Location within Russia
- Coordinates: 55°54′N 40°35′E
- Country: Russia
- Region: Vladimir Oblast
- District: Sudogodsky District
- Time zone: UTC+3:00

Burlygino (Russian: Бурлыгино) is a rural locality (a village) in Golovinskoye Rural Settlement, Sudogodsky District, Vladimir Oblast, Russia. The population was 93 as of 2010. There are 2 streets.

== Geography ==
Burlygino is located 24 km southwest of Sudogda (the district's administrative centre) by road. Turovo is the nearest rural locality.
