= Mostishchi, Vladimir Oblast =

Mostishchi Мостищи
- Village
- Location within Vladimir Oblast Location within Russia
- Coordinates: 55°50′N 41°11′E
- Country: Russia
- Region: Vladimir Oblast
- District: Sudogodsky District
- Time zone: UTC+3:00

Mostishchi (Russian: Мостищи) is a rural locality (a village) in Andreyevskoye Rural Settlement, Sudogodsky District, Vladimir Oblast, Russia. The population was 8 as of 2010.

== Geography ==
Mostishchi is located 28 km southeast of Sudogda, the administrative center of the district, by road. Novaya is the nearest rural locality.
