= Turovo, Sudogodsky District, Vladimir Oblast =

Turovo Турово
- Village
- Location within Vladimir Oblast Location within Russia
- Coordinates: 55°54′N 40°34′E
- Country: Russia
- Region: Vladimir Oblast
- District: Sudogodsky District
- Time zone: UTC+3:00

Turovo (Russian: Турово) is a rural locality (a village) in Golovinskoye Rural Settlement, Sudogodsky District, Vladimir Oblast, Russia. The population was 7 as of 2010.

== Geography ==
Turovo is located 11 km south-east from Golovino, 25 km southwest of Sudogda (the district's administrative centre) by road. Burlygino is the nearest rural locality.
