= Bakhtino =

Bakhtino Бахтино
- Village
- Location within Vladimir Oblast Location within Russia
- Coordinates: 56°05′N 41°02′E
- Country: Russia
- Region: Vladimir Oblast
- District: Sudogodsky District
- Time zone: UTC+3:00

Bakhtino (Russian: Бахтино) is a rural locality (a village) in Andreyevskoye Rural Settlement, Sudogodsky District, Vladimir Oblast, Russia. The population was 2 as of 2010.

== Geography ==
Bakhtino is located 38 km northeast of Sudogda (the district's administrative centre) by road. Kartmazovo is the nearest rural locality.
