= Likino, Vladimir Oblast =

Likino Ликино
- Selo
- Location within Vladimir Oblast Location within Russia
- Coordinates: 55°56′N 41°04′E
- Country: Russia
- Region: Vladimir Oblast
- District: Sudogodsky District
- Time zone: UTC+3:00

Likino (Russian: Ликино) is a rural locality (a selo) in Andreyevskoye Rural Settlement, Sudogodsky District, Vladimir Oblast, Russia. The population was 724 as of 2010. There are 6 streets.

== Geography ==
Likino is located 15 km east of Sudogda (the district's administrative centre) by road. Tyurmerovka is the nearest rural locality.
