= Moshok =

Moshok Мошок
- Selo
- Location within Vladimir Oblast Location within Russia
- Coordinates: 55°48′N 41°13′E
- Country: Russia
- Region: Vladimir Oblast
- District: Sudogodsky District
- Time zone: UTC+3:00

Moshok (Russian: Мошок) is a rural locality (a selo) and the administrative center of Moshokskoye Rural Settlement, Sudogodsky District, Vladimir Oblast, Russia. The population was 1,133 as of 2010. There are 13 streets.

== Geography ==
Moshok is located 33 km southeast of Sudogda (the district's administrative centre) by road. Kolchevo is the nearest rural locality.
