= Pigasovo =

Village in Vladimir Oblast, Russia (population: 17)

Pigasovo Пигасово
- Village
- Location within Vladimir Oblast Location within Russia
- Coordinates: 55°54′N 40°39′E
- Country: Russia
- Region: Vladimir Oblast
- District: Sudogodsky District
- Time zone: UTC+3:00

Pigasovo (Russian: Пигасово) is a rural locality (a village) in Golovinskoye Rural Settlement, Sudogodsky District, Vladimir Oblast, Russia. As of 2023, the population was 17.

== Geography ==
Pigasovo is located 28 km southwest of Sudogda (the district's administrative centre) by road and Avdotyino is the nearest rural locality.
