= Mitkino =

Mitkino Митькино
- Village
- Location within Vladimir Oblast Location within Russia
- Coordinates: 55°58′N 40°38′E
- Country: Russia
- Region: Vladimir Oblast
- District: Sudogodsky District
- Time zone: UTC+3:00

Mitkino (Russian: Митькино) is a rural locality (a village) in Golovinskoye Rural Settlement, Sudogodsky District, Vladimir Oblast, Russia. The population was 1 as of 2010.

== Geography ==
Mitkino is located on the Soyma River, 16 km west of Sudogda (the district's administrative centre) by road. Kostrovo is the nearest rural locality.
