= Vysokovo, Sudogodsky District, Vladimir Oblast =

Vysokovo Высоково
- Village
- Location within Vladimir Oblast Location within Russia
- Coordinates: 56°02′N 40°26′E
- Country: Russia
- Region: Vladimir Oblast
- District: Sudogodsky District
- Time zone: UTC+3:00

Vysokovo (Russian: Высоково) is a rural locality (a village) in Vyatkinskoye Rural Settlement, Sudogodsky District, Vladimir Oblast, Russia. The population was 31 as of 2010. There are 5 streets.

== Geography ==
Vysokovo is located 40 km northwest of Sudogda (the district's administrative centre) by road. Pavlovskaya is the nearest rural locality.
