= Alexandrovo, Sudogodsky District, Vladimir Oblast =

Alexandrovo Александрово
- Selo
- Location within Vladimir Oblast Location within Russia
- Coordinates: 55°56′N 40°37′E
- Country: Russia
- Region: Vladimir Oblast
- District: Sudogodsky District
- Time zone: UTC+3:00

Alexandrovo (Russian: Александрово) is a rural locality (a selo) in Golovinskoye Rural Settlement, Sudogodsky District, Vladimir Oblast, Russia. The population was 5 as of 2010.

== Geography ==
Alexandrovo is located 20 km west of Sudogda (the district's administrative centre) by road. Mordasovo is the nearest rural locality.
