= Stanki, Sudogodsky District, Vladimir Oblast =

Stanki Станки
- Village
- Location within Vladimir Oblast Location within Russia
- Coordinates: 56°03′N 40°40′E
- Country: Russia
- Region: Vladimir Oblast
- District: Sudogodsky District
- Time zone: UTC+3:00

Stanki (Russian: Станки) is a rural locality (a village) in Vyatkinskoye Rural Settlement, Sudogodsky District, Vladimir Oblast, Russia. The population was 6 as of 2010. There are 3 streets.

== Geography ==
Stanki is located 25 km northwest of Sudogda (the district's administrative centre) by road. Sokolovo is the nearest rural locality.
