= Novoye Polkhovo =

Novoye Polkhovo Новое Полхово
- Village
- Location within Vladimir Oblast Location within Russia
- Coordinates: 55°58′N 40°55′E
- Country: Russia
- Region: Vladimir Oblast
- District: Sudogodsky District
- Time zone: UTC+3:00

Novoye Polkhovo (Russian: Новое Полхово) is a rural locality (a village) in Lavrovskoye Rural Settlement, Sudogodsky District, Vladimir Oblast, Russia. The population was 62 as of 2010. There are 6 streets.

== Geography ==
Novoye Polkhovo is located on the Yada River, 6 km northeast of Sudogda (the district's administrative centre) by road. Zagorye is the nearest rural locality.
