= Slashchyovo =

Slashchyovo Слащёво
- Village
- Location within Vladimir Oblast Location within Russia
- Coordinates: 56°04′N 40°48′E
- Country: Russia
- Region: Vladimir Oblast
- District: Sudogodsky District
- Time zone: UTC+3:00

Slashchyovo (Russian: Слащёво) is a rural locality (a village) in Lavrovskoye Rural Settlement, Sudogodsky District, Vladimir Oblast, Russia. The population was 21 as of 2010.

== Geography ==
Slashchyovo is located on the Sudogda River, 15 km north of Sudogda (the district's administrative centre) by road. Mikhalevo is the nearest rural locality.
