= Beg, Sudogodsky District, Vladimir Oblast =

Beg Бег
- Settlement
- Location within Vladimir Oblast Location within Russia
- Coordinates: 55°56′N 40°50′E
- Country: Russia
- Region: Vladimir Oblast
- District: Sudogodsky District
- Time zone: UTC+3:00

Beg (Russian: Бег) is a rural locality (a settlement) in Muromtsevskoye Rural Settlement, Sudogodsky District, Vladimir Oblast, Russia. The population was 948 as of 2010. There are 7 streets.

== Geography ==
Beg is located 2 km southwest of Sudogda (the district's administrative centre) by road. Sudogda is the nearest rural locality.
