= Peredel (settlement) =

Peredel Передел
- Settlement
- Location within Vladimir Oblast Location within Russia
- Coordinates: 55°54′N 40°59′E
- Country: Russia
- Region: Vladimir Oblast
- District: Sudogodsky District
- Time zone: UTC+3:00

Peredel (Russian: Передел) is a rural locality (a settlement) in Muromtsevskoye Rural Settlement, Sudogodsky District, Vladimir Oblast, Russia. The population was 153 as of 2010. There are 8 streets.

== Geography ==
Peredel is located 13 km southeast of Sudogda (the district's administrative centre) by road. Peredel (village) is the nearest rural locality.
