= Gridino, Sudogodsky District, Vladimir Oblast =

Gridino Гридино
- Village
- Location within Vladimir Oblast Location within Russia
- Coordinates: 56°01′N 40°18′E
- Country: Russia
- Region: Vladimir Oblast
- District: Sudogodsky District
- Time zone: UTC+3:00

Gridino (Russian: Гридино) is a rural locality (a village) in Vyatkinskoye Rural Settlement, Sudogodsky District, Vladimir Oblast, Russia. The population was 234 as of 2010.

== Geography ==
The village is located 21 km south from Vladimir, 43 km north-west from Sudogda.
