= Demukhino =

Demukhino Демухино
- Village
- Location within Vladimir Oblast Location within Russia
- Coordinates: 55°50′N 41°20′E
- Country: Russia
- Region: Vladimir Oblast
- District: Sudogodsky District
- Time zone: UTC+3:00

Demukhino (Russian: Демухино) is a rural locality (a village) in Moshokskoye Rural Settlement, Sudogodsky District, Vladimir Oblast, Russia. The population was 21 as of 2010.

== Geography ==
Demukhino is located 45 km southeast of Sudogda (the district's administrative centre) by road. Gonobilovo is the nearest rural locality.
