= Mitino, Sudogodsky District, Vladimir Oblast =

Mitino Митино
- Village
- Location within Vladimir Oblast Location within Russia
- Coordinates: 55°56′N 41°20′E
- Country: Russia
- Region: Vladimir Oblast
- District: Sudogodsky District
- Time zone: UTC+3:00

Mitino (Russian: Митино) is a rural locality (a village) in Moshokskoye Rural Settlement, Sudogodsky District, Vladimir Oblast, Russia. The population was 15 as of 2010.

== Geography ==
Mitino is located 55 km east of Sudogda (the district's administrative centre) by road. Radilovo is the nearest rural locality.
