= Timeryovo, Vladimir Oblast =

Timeryovo Тимерёво
- Village
- Location within Vladimir Oblast Location within Russia
- Coordinates: 56°03′N 40°44′E
- Country: Russia
- Region: Vladimir Oblast
- District: Sudogodsky District
- Time zone: UTC+3:00

Timeryovo (Russian: Тимерёво) is a rural locality (a village) in Lavrovskoye Rural Settlement, Sudogodsky District, Vladimir Oblast, Russia. The population was 15 as of 2010.

== Geography ==
Timeryovo is located 15 km north-west from Lavrovo, 21 km northwest of Sudogda (the district's administrative centre) by road. Natalyinka is the nearest rural locality.
