= Karpovo, Sudogodsky District, Vladimir Oblast =

Karpovo Карпово
- Village
- Location within Vladimir Oblast Location within Russia
- Coordinates: 56°04′N 40°46′E
- Country: Russia
- Region: Vladimir Oblast
- District: Sudogodsky District
- Time zone: UTC+3:00

Karpovo (Russian: Карпово) is a rural locality (a village) in Lavrovskoye Rural Settlement, Sudogodsky District, Vladimir Oblast, Russia. The population was 1 as of 2010, and the district had three streets.

== Geography ==
Karpovo is located on the Voyninga River, 18 km north of Sudogda (the district's administrative centre) by road. Aksenovo is the nearest rural locality.
