= Novokarpovka =

Novokarpovka Новокарповка
- Village
- Location within Vladimir Oblast Location within Russia
- Coordinates: 56°05′N 40°41′E
- Country: Russia
- Region: Vladimir Oblast
- District: Sudogodsky District
- Time zone: UTC+3:00

Novokarpovka (Russian: Новокарповка) is a rural locality (a village) in Vyatkinskoye Rural Settlement, Sudogodsky District, Vladimir Oblast, Russia. The population was 7 as of 2010.

== Geography ==
Novokarpovka is located 45 km northwest of Sudogda (the district's administrative centre) by road. Sokolovo is the nearest rural locality.
