= Nepeytsino =

Nepeytsino Непейцыно
- Village
- Location within Vladimir Oblast Location within Russia
- Coordinates: 55°59′N 41°02′E
- Country: Russia
- Region: Vladimir Oblast
- District: Sudogodsky District
- Time zone: UTC+3:00

Nepeytsino (Russian: Непейцыно) is a rural locality (a village) in Andreyevskoye Rural Settlement, Sudogodsky District, Vladimir Oblast, Russia. The population was 30 as of 2010.

== Geography ==
Nepeytsino is located 30 km northeast of Sudogda (the district's administrative centre) by road. Bolshaya Kozlovka is the nearest rural locality.
