= Ovtsyno =

Ovtsyno Овцыно
- Village
- Location within Vladimir Oblast Location within Russia
- Coordinates: 56°00′N 40°46′E
- Country: Russia
- Region: Vladimir Oblast
- District: Sudogodsky District
- Time zone: UTC+3:00

Ovtsyno (Russian: Овцыно) is a rural locality (a village) in Golovinskoye Rural Settlement, Sudogodsky District, Vladimir Oblast, Russia. The population was 109 as of 2010. There are 4 streets.

== Geography ==
Ovtsyno is located on the Soyma River, 15 km northwest of Sudogda (the district's administrative centre) by road. Khokhlachi is the nearest rural locality.
