= Brykino =

Brykino Брыкино
- Village
- Location within Vladimir Oblast Location within Russia
- Coordinates: 55°56′N 41°12′E
- Country: Russia
- Region: Vladimir Oblast
- District: Sudogodsky District
- Time zone: UTC+3:00

Brykino (Russian: Брыкино) is a rural locality (a village) in Andreyevskoye Rural Settlement, Sudogodsky District, Vladimir Oblast, Russia. The population was 21 as of 2010.

== Geography ==
The village is located 3 km east from Andreyevo, 23 km east from Sudogda.
