= Dubyonki, Vladimir Oblast =

Dubyonki Дубёнки
- Village
- Location within Vladimir Oblast Location within Russia
- Coordinates: 55°53′N 40°43′E
- Country: Russia
- Region: Vladimir Oblast
- District: Sudogodsky District
- Time zone: UTC+3:00

Dubyonki (Russian: Дубёнки) is a rural locality (a village) in Muromtsevskoye Rural Settlement, Sudogodsky District, Vladimir Oblast, Russia. The population was 19 as of 2010.

== Geography ==
Dubyonki is located on the Dubyonka River, 15 km southwest of Sudogda (the district's administrative centre) by road. Klavdino is the nearest rural locality.
