= Spas-Beseda =

Spas-Beseda Спас-Беседа
- Selo
- Location within Vladimir Oblast Location within Russia
- Coordinates: 55°59′N 40°48′E
- Country: Russia
- Region: Vladimir Oblast
- District: Sudogodsky District
- Time zone: UTC+3:00

Spas-Beseda (Russian: Спас-Беседа) is a rural locality (a selo) in Lavrovskoye Rural Settlement, Sudogodsky District, Vladimir Oblast, Russia. The population was 8 as of 2010. There are 3 streets.

== Geography ==
Spas-Beseda is located 7 km north of Sudogda (the district's administrative centre) by road. Lavrovo is the nearest rural locality.
