= Cherepovo, Vladimir Oblast =

Cherepovo Черепово
- Village
- Location within Vladimir Oblast Location within Russia
- Coordinates: 55°59′N 40°23′E
- Country: Russia
- Region: Vladimir Oblast
- District: Sudogodsky District
- Time zone: UTC+3:00

Cherepovo (Russian: Черепово) is a rural locality (a village) in Golovinskoye Rural Settlement, Sudogodsky District, Vladimir Oblast, Russia. The population was 3 as of 2010.

== Geography ==
Cherepovo is located 38 km west of Sudogda (the district's administrative centre) by road. Prokunino is the nearest rural locality.
