= Korostelyovo =

Korostelyovo Коростелёво
- Village
- Location within Vladimir Oblast Location within Russia
- Coordinates: 56°01′N 40°16′E
- Country: Russia
- Region: Vladimir Oblast
- District: Sudogodsky District
- Time zone: UTC+3:00

Korostelyovo (Russian: Коростелёво) is a rural locality (a village) in Vyatkinskoye Rural Settlement, Sudogodsky District, Vladimir Oblast, Russia. The population was 42 as of 2010.

== Geography ==
Korostelyovo is located 45 km northwest of Sudogda (the district's administrative centre) by road. Fryazino is the nearest rural locality.
