= Baygushi =

Baygushi Байгуши
- Village
- Location within Vladimir Oblast Location within Russia
- Coordinates: 56°04′N 40°29′E
- Country: Russia
- Region: Vladimir Oblast
- District: Sudogodsky District
- Time zone: UTC+3:00

Baygushi (Russian: Байгуши) is a rural locality (a village) in Vyatkinskoye Rural Settlement, Sudogodsky District, Vladimir Oblast, Russia. The population was 112 as of 2010. There are 7 streets.

== Geography ==
Baygushi is located 29 km northwest of Sudogda (the district's administrative centre) by road. Vyatkino is the nearest rural locality.
