= Bogdantsevo =

Bogdantsevo Богданцево
- Village
- Location within Vladimir Oblast Location within Russia
- Coordinates: 56°07′N 40°45′E
- Country: Russia
- Region: Vladimir Oblast
- District: Sudogodsky District
- Time zone: UTC+3:00

Bogdantsevo (Russian: Богданцево) is a rural locality (a village) in Lavrovskoye Rural Settlement, Sudogodsky District, Vladimir Oblast, Russia. The population was 11 as of 2010.

== Geography ==
Bogdantsevo is located 24 km north of Sudogda (the district's administrative centre) by road. Maslovo is the nearest rural locality.
