= Torzhkovo =

Torzhkovo Торжково
- Village
- Location within Vladimir Oblast Location within Russia
- Coordinates: 56°03′N 40°46′E
- Country: Russia
- Region: Vladimir Oblast
- District: Sudogodsky District
- Time zone: UTC+3:00

Torzhkovo (Russian: Торжково) is a rural locality (a village) in Lavrovskoye Rural Settlement, Sudogodsky District, Vladimir Oblast, Russia. The population was 6 as of 2010.

== Geography ==
Torzhkovo is located on the Voyninga River, 18 km northwest of Sudogda (the district's administrative centre) by road. Sukhovka is the nearest rural locality.
