= Smykovo =

Smykovo Смыково
- Village
- Location within Vladimir Oblast Location within Russia
- Coordinates: 56°07′N 40°53′E
- Country: Russia
- Region: Vladimir Oblast
- District: Sudogodsky District
- Population (2010): 38
- Time zone: UTC+3:00

Smykovo (Russian: Смыково) is a rural locality (a village) in Lavrovskoye Rural Settlement, Sudogodsky District, Vladimir Oblast, Russia. The population was 38 as of 2010.

== Geography ==
Smykovo is located 23 km north of Sudogda (the district's administrative centre) by road. Michurino is the nearest rural locality.
