= Tolstovo =

Tolstovo Толстово
- Village
- Location within Vladimir Oblast Location within Russia
- Coordinates: 55°56′N 40°23′E
- Country: Russia
- Region: Vladimir Oblast
- District: Sudogodsky District
- Time zone: UTC+3:00

Tolstovo (Russian: Толстово) is a rural locality (a village) in Golovinskoye Rural Settlement, Sudogodsky District, Vladimir Oblast, Russia. The population was 5 as of 2010.

== Geography ==
Tolstovo is located 3 km south-west from Golovino, 36 km west of Sudogda (the district's administrative centre) by road. Rogovo is the nearest rural locality.
