= Prokunino =

Prokunino Прокунино
- Village
- Location within Vladimir Oblast Location within Russia
- Coordinates: 55°58′N 40°22′E
- Country: Russia
- Region: Vladimir Oblast
- District: Sudogodsky District
- Time zone: UTC+3:00

Prokunino (Russian: Прокунино) is a rural locality (a village) in Golovinskoye Rural Settlement, Sudogodsky District, Vladimir Oblast, Russia. The population was 4 as of 2010.

== Geography ==
It is located 4 km north-west from Golovino, 3 km east from Sudogda.
