= Tikhonovo, Sudogodsky District, Vladimir Oblast =

Tikhonovo Тихоново
- Village
- Location within Vladimir Oblast Location within Russia
- Coordinates: 55°56′N 40°33′E
- Country: Russia
- Region: Vladimir Oblast
- District: Sudogodsky District
- Time zone: UTC+3:00

Tikhonovo (Russian: Тихоново) is a rural locality (a village) in Golovinskoye Rural Settlement, Sudogodsky District, Vladimir Oblast, Russia. The population was 3 as of 2010. There are 2 streets.

== Geography ==
Tikhonovo is located 10 km south-east from Golovino, 21 km west of Sudogda (the district's administrative centre) by road. Spirino is the nearest rural locality.
