= Chamerevo =

Chamerevo Чамерево
- Selo
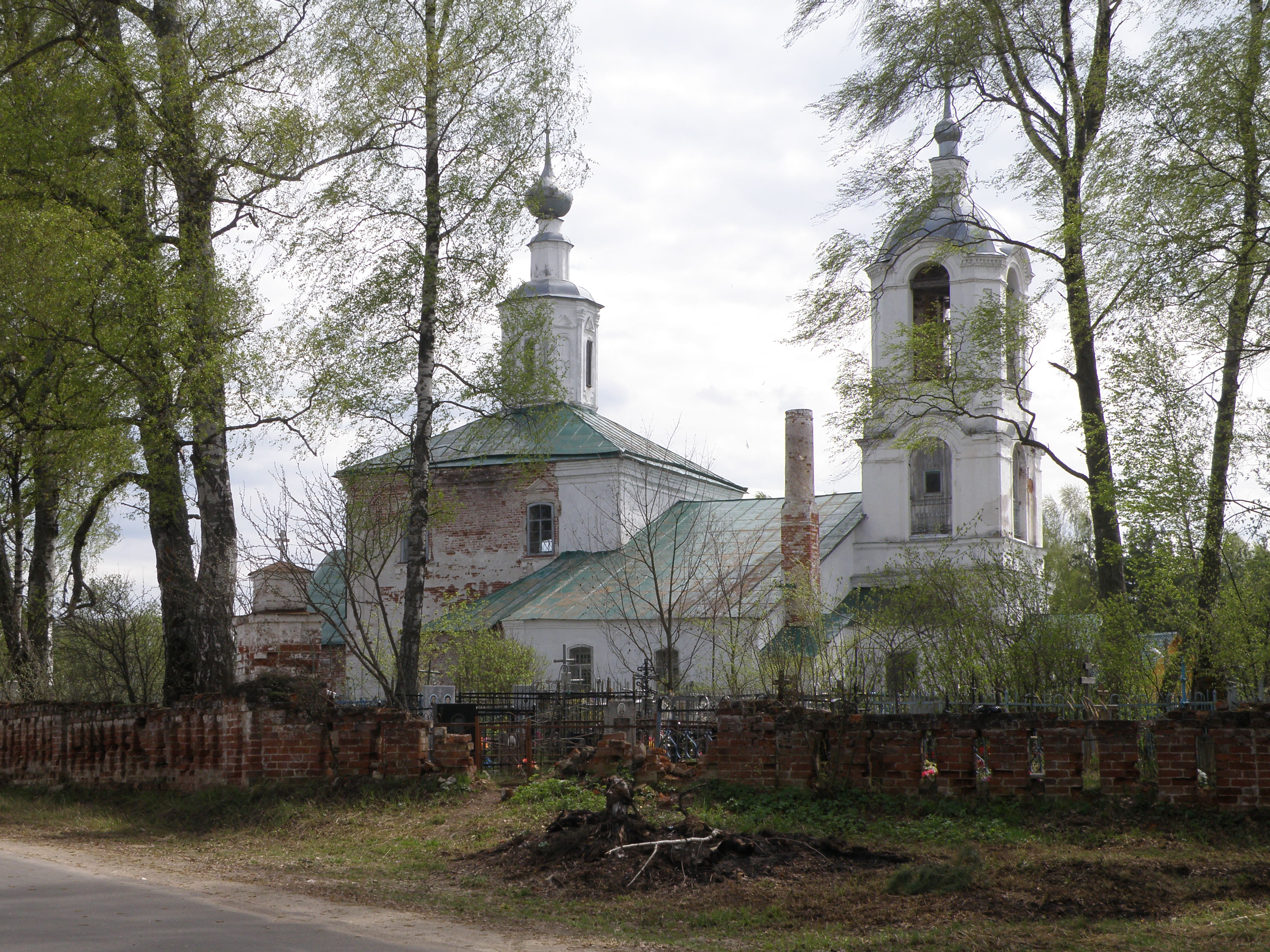
- Church in the area

- Location within Vladimir Oblast Location within Russia
- Coordinates: 56°04′N 40°47′E
- Country: Russia
- Region: Vladimir Oblast
- District: Sudogodsky District
- Time zone: UTC+3:00

Chamerevo (Russian: Чамерево) is a rural locality (a selo) in Lavrovskoye Rural Settlement, Sudogodsky District, Vladimir Oblast, Russia. The population was 572 as of 2010. There are 13 streets.

== Geography ==
Chamerevo is located on the right bank of the Voyninga River, 15 km north of Sudogda (the district's administrative centre) by road. Slashchyovo is the nearest rural locality.
