= Spas-Kupalishche =

Spas-Kupalishche Спас-Купалище
- Selo
- Location within Vladimir Oblast Location within Russia
- Coordinates: 56°08′N 40°49′E
- Country: Russia
- Region: Vladimir Oblast
- District: Sudogodsky District
- Time zone: UTC+3:00

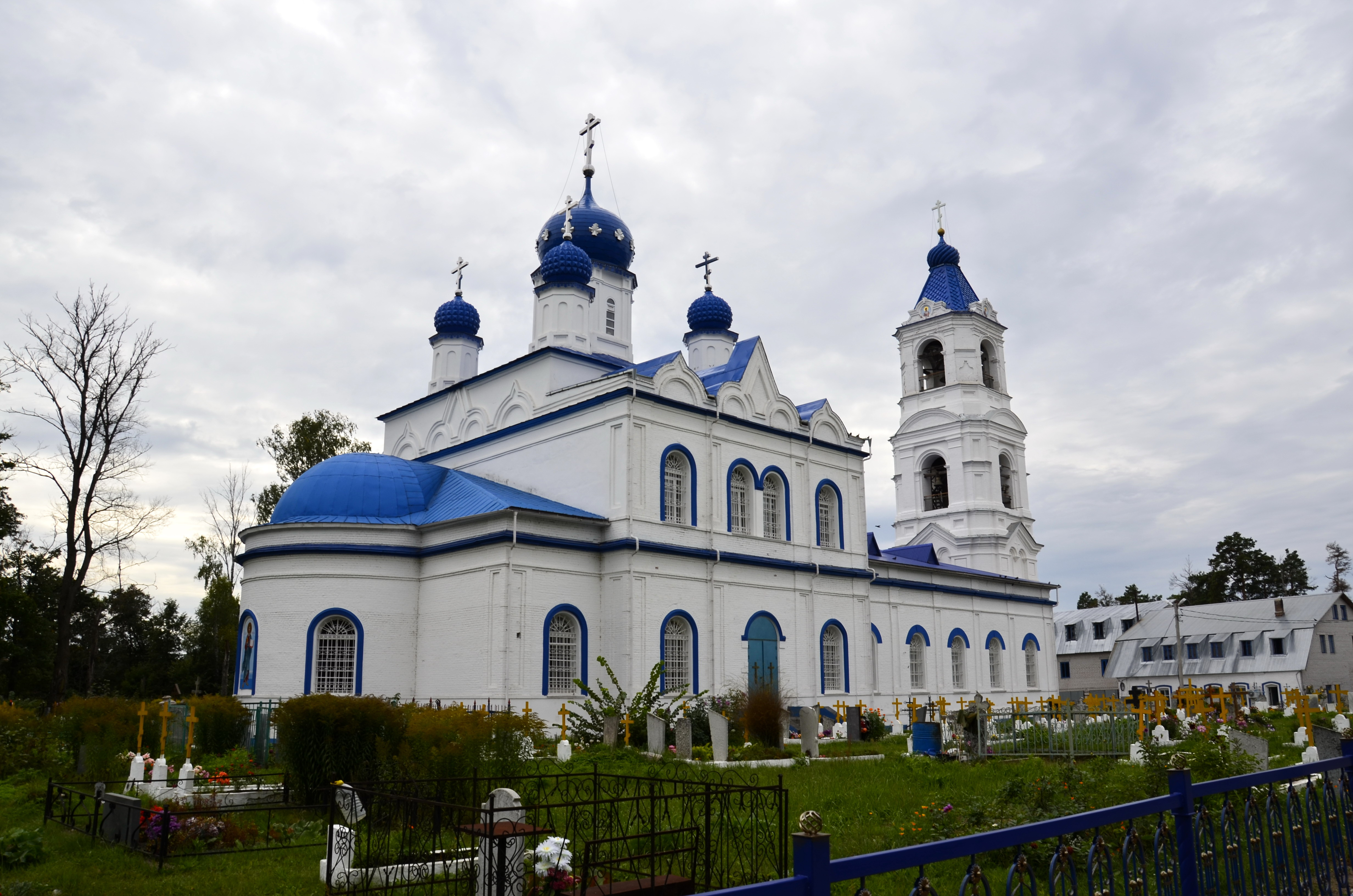
A Church in Spas-Kupalishche

Spas-Kupalishche (Russian: Спас-Купалище) is a rural locality (a selo) in Lavrovskoye Rural Settlement, Sudogodsky District, Vladimir Oblast, Russia. The population was 34 as of 2010.

== Geography ==
Spas-Kupalishche is located on the right bank of the Klyazma River, 31 km north of Sudogda (the district's administrative centre) by road. Danilovka is the nearest rural locality.
