= Gorki, Sudogodsky District, Vladimir Oblast =

Gorki Горки
- Village
- Location within Vladimir Oblast Location within Russia
- Coordinates: 55°54′N 40°54′E
- Country: Russia
- Region: Vladimir Oblast
- District: Sudogodsky District
- Time zone: UTC+3:00

Gorki (Russian: Горки) is a rural locality (a village) in Muromtsevskoye Rural Settlement, Sudogodsky District, Vladimir Oblast, Russia. The population was 139 as of 2010.

== Geography ==
Gorki is located 7 km south of Sudogda (the district's administrative centre) by road. Muromtsevo is the nearest rural locality.
