= Baraki, Vladimir Oblast =

Baraki Бараки
- Village
- Location within Vladimir Oblast Location within Russia
- Coordinates: 56°02′N 40°32′E
- Country: Russia
- Region: Vladimir Oblast
- District: Sudogodsky District
- Time zone: UTC+3:00

Baraki (Russian: Бараки) is a rural locality (a village) in Vyatkinskoye Rural Settlement, Sudogodsky District, Vladimir Oblast, Russia. The population was 826 as of 2010. There are 18 streets.

== Geography ==
Baraki is located 24 km northwest of Sudogda (the district's administrative centre) by road. Vyatkino is the nearest rural locality.
