= Mitroshino =

Mitroshino Митрошино
- Village
- Location within Vladimir Oblast Location within Russia
- Coordinates: 55°58′N 40°29′E
- Country: Russia
- Region: Vladimir Oblast
- District: Sudogodsky District
- Time zone: UTC+3:00

Mitroshino (Russian: Митрошино) is a rural locality (a village) in Golovinskoye Rural Settlement, Sudogodsky District, Vladimir Oblast, Russia. The population was 6 as of 2010.

== Geography ==
Mitroshino is located 28 km west of Sudogda (the district's administrative centre) by road. Inyutino is the nearest rural locality.
