= Nevryuyevo =

Nevryuyevo Неврюево
- Village
- Location within Vladimir Oblast Location within Russia
- Coordinates: 56°00′N 40°26′E
- Country: Russia
- Region: Vladimir Oblast
- District: Sudogodsky District
- Time zone: UTC+3:00

Nevryuyevo (Russian: Неврюево) is a rural locality (a village) in Vyatkinskoye Rural Settlement, Sudogodsky District, Vladimir Oblast, Russia. The population was 15 as of 2010.

== Geography ==
Nevryuyevo is located 45 km northwest of Sudogda (the district's administrative centre) by road. Nizhnyaya Zaninka is the nearest rural locality.
