= Kashmanovo =

Kashmanovo Кашманово
- Village
- Location within Vladimir Oblast Location within Russia
- Coordinates: 55°56′N 40°35′E
- Country: Russia
- Region: Vladimir Oblast
- District: Sudogodsky District
- Time zone: UTC+3:00

Kashmanovo (Russian: Кашманово) is a rural locality (a village) in Golovinskoye Rural Settlement, Sudogodsky District, Vladimir Oblast, Russia. The population was 3 as of 2010.

== Geography ==
Kashmanovo is located 20 km west of Sudogda (the district's administrative centre) by road. Brykino is the nearest rural locality.
