= Alfyorovo (Muromtsevskoye Rural Settlement), Sudogodsky District, Vladimir Oblast =

Alfyorovo Алфёрово
- Village
- Location within Vladimir Oblast Location within Russia
- Coordinates: 55°51′N 40°55′E
- Country: Russia
- Region: Vladimir Oblast
- District: Sudogodsky District
- Time zone: UTC+3:00

Alfyorovo (Russian: Алфёрово) is a rural locality (a village) in Muromtsevskoye Rural Settlement, Sudogodsky District, Vladimir Oblast, Russia. The population was 11 as of 2010.

== Geography ==
It is located 10 km south from Muromtsevo, 13 km south from Sudogda.
