= Lukinskogo doma invalidov =

Lukinskogo doma invalidov Лукинского дома инвалидов
- Settlement
- Location within Vladimir Oblast Location within Russia
- Coordinates: 55°59′N 40°30′E
- Country: Russia
- Region: Vladimir Oblast
- District: Sudogodsky District
- Time zone: UTC+3:00

Lukinskogo doma invalidov (Russian: Лукинского дома инвалидов) is a rural locality (a settlement) in Golovinskoye Rural Settlement, Sudogodsky District, Vladimir Oblast, Russia. The population was 111 as of 2010.

== Geography ==
Lukinskogo doma invalidov is located 28 km west of Sudogda (the district's administrative centre) by road. Komary is the nearest rural locality.
