= Zayastrebye =

Zayastrebye Заястребье
- Selo
- Location within Vladimir Oblast Location within Russia
- Coordinates: 55°51′N 40°56′E
- Country: Russia
- Region: Vladimir Oblast
- District: Sudogodsky District
- Time zone: UTC+3:00

Zayastrebye (Russian: Заястребье) is a rural locality (a selo) in Muromtsevskoye Rural Settlement, Sudogodsky District, Vladimir Oblast, Russia. The population was 28 as of 2010.

== Geography ==
Zayastrebye is located 16 km southeast of Sudogda (the district's administrative centre) by road. Alferovo is the nearest rural locality.
