= Staroye Chubarovo =

Staroye Chubarovo Старое Чубарово
- Village
- Location within Vladimir Oblast Location within Russia
- Coordinates: 55°58′N 40°57′E
- Country: Russia
- Region: Vladimir Oblast
- District: Sudogodsky District
- Time zone: UTC+3:00

Staroye Chubarovo (Russian: Старое Чубарово) is a rural locality (a village) in Lavrovskoye Rural Settlement, Sudogodsky District, Vladimir Oblast, Russia. The population was 8 as of 2010.

== Geography ==
Staroye Chubarovo is located on the Yada River, 9 km east of Sudogda (the district's administrative centre) by road. Zagorye is the nearest rural locality.
