= Staroye Kubayevo =

Staroye Kubayevo Старое Кубаево
- Village
- Location within Vladimir Oblast Location within Russia
- Coordinates: 55°53′N 41°13′E
- Country: Russia
- Region: Vladimir Oblast
- District: Sudogodsky District
- Time zone: UTC+3:00

Staroye Kubayevo (Russian: Старое Кубаево) is a rural locality (a village) in Andreyevskoye Rural Settlement, Sudogodsky District, Vladimir Oblast, Russia. The population was 1 as of 2010.

== Geography ==
Staroye Kubayevo is located 28 km southeast of Sudogda (the district's administrative centre) by road. Novaya is the nearest rural locality.
