= Kliny, Sudogodsky District, Vladimir Oblast =

Kliny Клины
- Village
- Location within Vladimir Oblast Location within Russia
- Coordinates: 55°56′N 40°37′E
- Country: Russia
- Region: Vladimir Oblast
- District: Sudogodsky District
- Time zone: UTC+3:00

Kliny (Russian: Клины) is a rural locality (a village) in Golovinskoye Rural Settlement, Sudogodsky District, Vladimir Oblast, Russia. The population was 14 as of 2010.

== Geography ==
Kliny is located on the Kamenka River, 19 km west of Sudogda (the district's administrative centre) by road. Kashmanovo is the nearest rural locality.
