= Proskurinskaya =

Proskurinskaya Проскуринская
- Village
- Location within Vladimir Oblast Location within Russia
- Coordinates: 56°02′N 40°29′E
- Country: Russia
- Region: Vladimir Oblast
- District: Sudogodsky District
- Time zone: UTC+3:00

Proskurinskaya (Russian: Проскуринская) is a rural locality (a village) in Vyatkinskoye Rural Settlement, Sudogodsky District, Vladimir Oblast, Russia. The population was 6 as of 2010.

== Geography ==
Proskurinskaya is located 36 km northwest of Sudogda (the district's administrative centre) by road. Pavlovskaya is the nearest rural locality.
