= Kolychevo =

Kolychevo Колычево
- Village
- Location within Vladimir Oblast Location within Russia
- Coordinates: 55°46′N 41°17′E
- Country: Russia
- Region: Vladimir Oblast
- District: Sudogodsky District
- Time zone: UTC+3:00

Kolychevo (Russian: Колычево) is a rural locality (a village) in Moshokskoye Rural Settlement, Sudogodsky District, Vladimir Oblast, Russia. The population was 102 as of 2010. There are 2 streets.

== Geography ==
Kolychevo is located 39 km southeast of Sudogda (the district's administrative centre) by road. Karevo is the nearest rural locality.
