= Lunkovo =

Lunkovo Луньково
- Village
- Location within Vladimir Oblast Location within Russia
- Coordinates: 55°57′N 40°34′E
- Country: Russia
- Region: Vladimir Oblast
- District: Sudogodsky District
- Time zone: UTC+3:00

Lunkovo (Russian: Луньково) is a rural locality (a village) in Golovinskoye Rural Settlement, Sudogodsky District, Vladimir Oblast, Russia. The population was 11 as of 2010. There are 2 streets.

== Geography ==
Lunkovo is located 21 km west of Sudogda (the district's administrative centre) by road. Brykino is the nearest rural locality.
