= Brykino (Golovinskoye Rural Settlement), Sudogodsky District, Vladimir Oblast =

Brykino Брыкино
- Village
- Location within Vladimir Oblast Location within Russia
- Coordinates: 55°56′N 40°34′E
- Country: Russia
- Region: Vladimir Oblast
- District: Sudogodsky District
- Time zone: UTC+3:00

Brykino (Russian: Брыкино) is a rural locality (a village) in Golovinskoye Rural Settlement, Sudogodsky District, Vladimir Oblast, Russia. The population was 5 as of 2010.

== Geography ==
The village is located 10 km south-east from Golovino, 19 km west from Sudogda.
