= Bokusha =

Bokusha Бокуша
- Village
- Location within Vladimir Oblast Location within Russia
- Coordinates: 56°03′N 40°48′E
- Country: Russia
- Region: Vladimir Oblast
- District: Sudogodsky District
- Time zone: UTC+3:00

Bokusha (Russian: Бокуша) is a rural locality (a village) in Lavrovskoye Rural Settlement, Sudogodsky District, Vladimir Oblast, Russia. The population was 22 as of 2010.

== Geography ==
Bokusha is located 14 km north of Sudogda (the district's administrative centre) by road. Popelyonki is the nearest rural locality.
