= Prokunino (Muromtsevskoye Rural Settlement), Sudogodsky District, Vladimir Oblast =

Prokunino Прокунино
- Village
- Location within Vladimir Oblast Location within Russia
- Coordinates: 55°50′N 40°47′E
- Country: Russia
- Region: Vladimir Oblast
- District: Sudogodsky District
- Time zone: UTC+3:00

Prokunino (Russian: Прокунино) is a rural locality (a village) in Muromtsevskoye Rural Settlement, Sudogodsky District, Vladimir Oblast, Russia. The population was 24 as of 2010.

== Geography ==
It is located on the Poboyka River, 15 km south from Sudogda.
