= Kondryayevo =

Kondryayevo Кондряево
- Village
- Location within Vladimir Oblast Location within Russia
- Coordinates: 55°49′N 41°03′E
- Country: Russia
- Region: Vladimir Oblast
- District: Sudogodsky District
- Time zone: UTC+3:00

Kondryayevo (Russian: Кондряево) is a rural locality (a village) in Moshokskoye Rural Settlement, Sudogodsky District, Vladimir Oblast, Russia. The population was 403 as of 2010. There are 4 streets.

== Geography ==
Kondryayevo is located 45 km southeast of Sudogda (the district's administrative centre) by road. Nikolskoye is the nearest rural locality.
