= Pogrebishchi =

Pogrebishchi Погребищи
- Village
- Location within Vladimir Oblast Location within Russia
- Coordinates: 56°03′N 40°28′E
- Country: Russia
- Region: Vladimir Oblast
- District: Sudogodsky District
- Time zone: UTC+3:00

Pogrebishchi (Russian: Погребищи) is a rural locality (a village) in Vyatkinskoye Rural Settlement, Sudogodsky District, Vladimir Oblast, Russia. The population was 46 as of 2010. There are 10 streets.

== Geography ==
Pogrebishchi is located 35 km northwest of Sudogda (the district's administrative centre) by road. Vyatkino is the nearest rural locality.
