= Popelyonki =

Popelyonki Попелёнки
- Village
- Location within Vladimir Oblast Location within Russia
- Coordinates: 56°03′N 40°49′E
- Country: Russia
- Region: Vladimir Oblast
- District: Sudogodsky District
- Time zone: UTC+3:00

Popelyonki (Russian: Попелёнки) is a rural locality (a village) in Lavrovskoye Rural Settlement, Sudogodsky District, Vladimir Oblast, Russia. The population was 6 as of 2010. There are 2 streets.

== Geography ==
Popelyonki is located on the Sudogda River, 14 km north of Sudogda (the district's administrative centre) by road.
