= Zagorye =

Zagorye Загорье
- Village
- Location within Vladimir Oblast Location within Russia
- Coordinates: 55°58′N 40°56′E
- Country: Russia
- Region: Vladimir Oblast
- District: Sudogodsky District
- Time zone: UTC+3:00

Zagorye (Russian: Загорье) is a rural locality (a village) in Lavrovskoye Rural Settlement, Sudogodsky District, Vladimir Oblast, Russia. The population was 46 as of 2010.

== Geography ==
Zagorye is located 8 km northeast of Sudogda (the district's administrative centre) by road. Novoye Polkhovo is the nearest rural locality.
