= Staroye Polkhovo =

Staroye Polkhovo Старое Полхово
- Village
- Location within Vladimir Oblast Location within Russia
- Coordinates: 55°57′N 40°54′E
- Country: Russia
- Region: Vladimir Oblast
- District: Sudogodsky District
- Time zone: UTC+3:00

Staroye Polkhovo (Russian: Старое Полхово) is a rural locality (a village) in Lavrovskoye Rural Settlement, Sudogodsky District, Vladimir Oblast, Russia. The population was 86 as of 2010. There are 6 streets.

== Geography ==
Staroye Polkhovo is located 4 km northeast of Sudogda (the district's administrative centre) by road. Novoye Polkhovo is the nearest rural locality.
