= Peredel =

Peredel Передел
- Village
- Location within Vladimir Oblast Location within Russia
- Coordinates: 55°54′N 40°59′E
- Country: Russia
- Region: Vladimir Oblast
- District: Sudogodsky District
- Time zone: UTC+3:00

Peredel (Russian: Передел) is a rural locality (a village) in Muromtsevskoye Rural Settlement, Sudogodsky District, Vladimir Oblast, Russia. The population was 32 as of 2010.

== Geography ==
Peredel is located 11 km southeast of Sudogda (the district's administrative centre) by road. Peredel (settlement) is the nearest rural locality.
