= Lavrovo, Sudogodsky District, Vladimir Oblast =

Lavrovo Лаврово
- Village
- Location within Vladimir Oblast Location within Russia
- Coordinates: 55°58′N 40°50′E
- Country: Russia
- Region: Vladimir Oblast
- District: Sudogodsky District
- Time zone: UTC+3:00

Lavrovo (Russian: Лаврово) is a rural locality (a village) and the administrative center of Lavrovskoye Rural Settlement, Sudogodsky District, Vladimir Oblast, Russia. The population was 702 as of 2010. There are 12 streets.

== Geography ==
Lavrovo is located 5 km north of Sudogda (the district's administrative centre) by road. Spas-Beseda is the nearest rural locality.
