= Kolesnya =

Kolesnya Колесня
- Village
- Location within Vladimir Oblast Location within Russia
- Coordinates: 55°55′N 41°01′E
- Country: Russia
- Region: Vladimir Oblast
- District: Sudogodsky District
- Time zone: UTC+3:00

Kolesnya (Russian: Колесня) is a rural locality (a village) in Lavrovskoye Rural Settlement, Sudogodsky District, Vladimir Oblast, Russia. The population was 22 as of 2010.

== Geography ==
Kolesnya is located 18 km southeast of Sudogda (the district's administrative centre) by road. Peredel is the nearest rural locality.
