= Yakushevo =

Yakushevo Якушево
- Village
- Location within Vladimir Oblast Location within Russia
- Coordinates: 56°01′N 40°20′E
- Country: Russia
- Region: Vladimir Oblast
- District: Sudogodsky District
- Time zone: UTC+3:00

Yakushevo (Russian: Якушево) is a rural locality (a village) in Vyatkinskoye Rural Settlement, Sudogodsky District, Vladimir Oblast, Russia. The population was 3 as of 2010. There are 4 streets.

== Geography ==
Yakushevo is located 47 km northwest of Sudogda (the district's administrative centre) by road. Konyushino is the nearest rural locality.
