= Daniltsevo =

Daniltsevo Данильцево
- Village
- Location within Vladimir Oblast Location within Russia
- Coordinates: 55°51′N 40°47′E
- Country: Russia
- Region: Vladimir Oblast
- District: Sudogodsky District
- Time zone: UTC+3:00

Daniltsevo (Russian: Данильцево) is a rural locality (a village) in Muromtsevskoye Rural Settlement, Sudogodsky District, Vladimir Oblast, Russia. The population was 10 as of 2010.

== Geography ==
Daniltsevo is located on the Poboyka River, 14 km south of Sudogda (the district's administrative centre) by road. Volnaya Artemovka is the nearest rural locality.
