= Yazykovo, Vladimir Oblast =

Yazykovo Языково
- Selo
- Location within Vladimir Oblast Location within Russia
- Coordinates: 55°58′N 41°13′E
- Country: Russia
- Region: Vladimir Oblast
- District: Sudogodsky District
- Time zone: UTC+3:00

Yazykovo (Russian: Языково) is a rural locality (a selo) in Andreyevskoye Rural Settlement, Sudogodsky District, Vladimir Oblast, Russia. The population was 48 as of 2010.

== Geography ==
Yazykovo is located 28 km east of Sudogda (the district's administrative centre) by road. Bolotsky is the nearest rural locality.
