= Kordon Moshokskogo lesnichestva =

Kordon Moshokskogo lesnichestva Кордон Мошокского лесничества
- Kordon
- Location within Vladimir Oblast Location within Russia
- Coordinates: 55°50′N 41°16′E
- Country: Russia
- Region: Vladimir Oblast
- District: Sudogodsky District
- Time zone: UTC+3:00

Kordon Moshokskogo lesnichestva (Russian: Кордон Мошокского лесничества) is a rural locality (a kordon) in Moshokskoye Rural Settlement, Sudogodsky District, Vladimir Oblast, Russia. The population was 8 as of 2010.

== Geography ==
It is located 3 km north from Moshok, 30 km south-east from Sudogda.
