= Vyozhki =

Vyozhki Вёжки
- Village
- Location within Vladimir Oblast Location within Russia
- Coordinates: 55°53′N 41°19′E
- Country: Russia
- Region: Vladimir Oblast
- District: Sudogodsky District
- Time zone: UTC+3:00

Vyozhki (Russian: Вёжки) is a rural locality (a village) in Moshokskoye Rural Settlement, Sudogodsky District, Vladimir Oblast, Russia. The population was 51 as of 2010.

== Geography ==
Vyozhki is located 50 km east of Sudogda (the district's administrative centre) by road. Sinitsino is the nearest rural locality.
