= Malakhovo, Sudogodsky District, Vladimir Oblast =

Malakhovo Малахово
- Village
- Location within Vladimir Oblast Location within Russia
- Coordinates: 56°01′N 40°17′E
- Country: Russia
- Region: Vladimir Oblast
- District: Sudogodsky District
- Time zone: UTC+3:00

Malakhovo (Russian: Малахово) is a rural locality (a village) in Vyatkinskoye Rural Settlement, Sudogodsky District, Vladimir Oblast, Russia. The population was 22 as of 2010. There are 2 streets.

== Geography ==
Malakhovo is located 46 km northwest of Sudogda (the district's administrative centre) by road. Verkhnyaya Zaninka is the nearest rural locality.
