= Travinino =

Travinino Травинино
- Village
- Location within Vladimir Oblast Location within Russia
- Coordinates: 55°52′N 40°54′E
- Country: Russia
- Region: Vladimir Oblast
- District: Sudogodsky District
- Time zone: UTC+3:00

Travinino (Russian: Травинино) is a rural locality (a village) in Muromtsevskoye Rural Settlement, Sudogodsky District, Vladimir Oblast, Russia. The population was 58 as of 2010.

== Geography ==
Travinino is located on the Yastreb River, 12 km south of Sudogda (the district's administrative centre) by road. Dvorishnevo is the nearest rural locality.
