= Nikitino, Sudogodsky District, Vladimir Oblast =

Nikitino Никитино
- Village
- Location within Vladimir Oblast Location within Russia
- Coordinates: 55°58′N 40°27′E
- Country: Russia
- Region: Vladimir Oblast
- District: Sudogodsky District
- Time zone: UTC+3:00

Nikitino (Russian: Никитино) is a rural locality (a village) in Golovinskoye Rural Settlement, Sudogodsky District, Vladimir Oblast, Russia. The population was 9 as of 2010.

== Geography ==
Nikitino is located 33 km west of Sudogda (the district's administrative centre) by road. Alferovo is the nearest rural locality.
