= Sokolovo, Sudogodsky District, Vladimir Oblast =

Sokolovo Соколово
- Village
- Location within Vladimir Oblast Location within Russia
- Coordinates: 56°04′N 40°40′E
- Country: Russia
- Region: Vladimir Oblast
- District: Sudogodsky District
- Time zone: UTC+3:00

Sokolovo (Russian: Соколово) is a rural locality (a village) in Vyatkinskoye Rural Settlement, Sudogodsky District, Vladimir Oblast, Russia. The population was 25 as of 2010. There are 5 streets.

== Geography ==
Sokolovo is located on the Ushcherka River, 27 km northwest of Sudogda (the district's administrative centre) by road. Stanki is the nearest rural locality.
