= Volnaya Artyomovka =

Volnaya Artyomovka Вольная Артёмовка
- Village
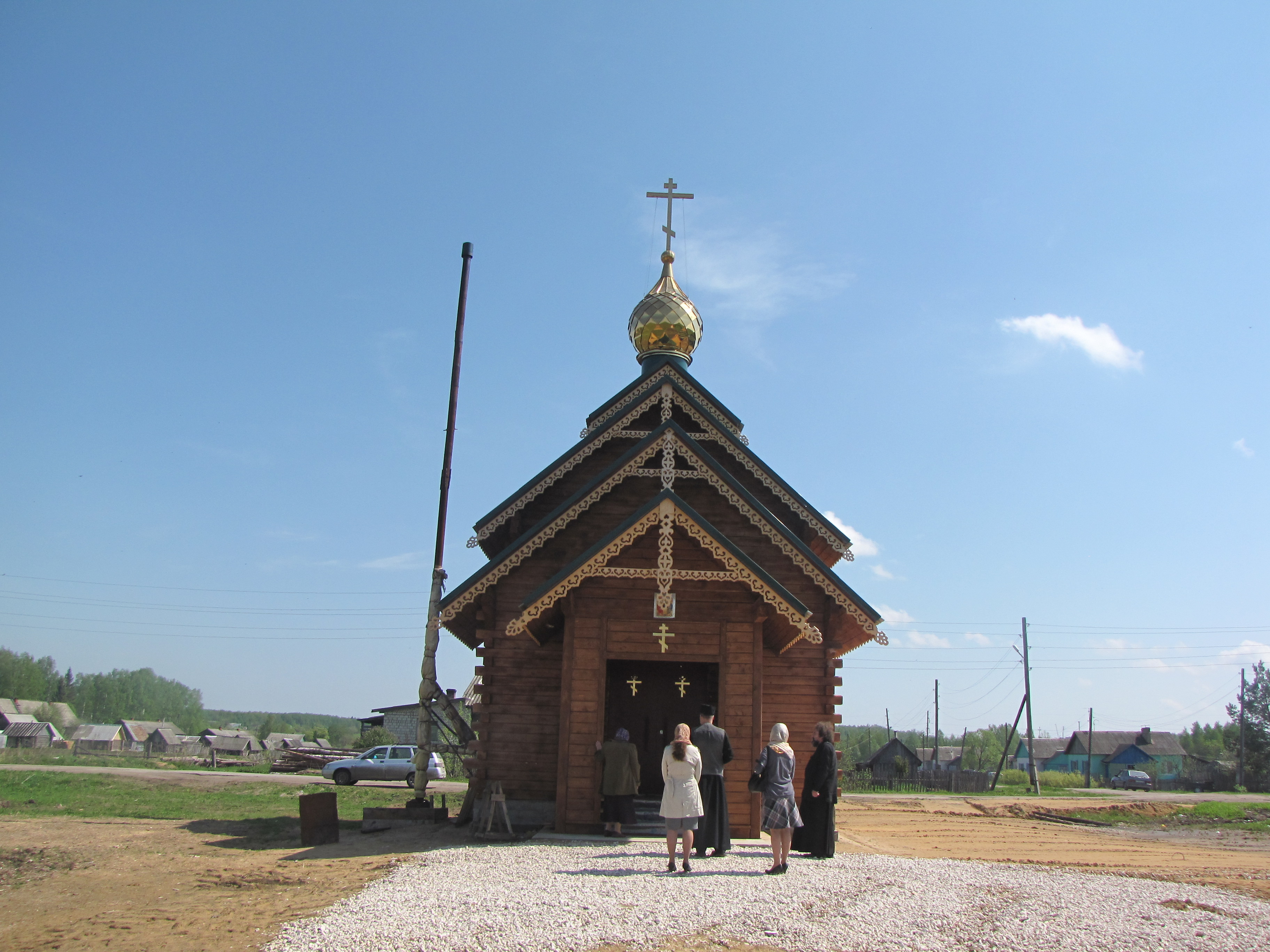
- Church of the Life-Giving Trinity in Volnaya Artyomivka

- Location within Vladimir Oblast Location within Russia
- Coordinates: 55°50′N 40°47′E
- Country: Russia
- Region: Vladimir Oblast
- District: Sudogodsky District
- Time zone: UTC+3:00

Volnaya Artyomovka (Russian: Вольная Артёмовка) is a rural locality (a village) in Muromtsevskoye Rural Settlement, Sudogodsky District, Vladimir Oblast, Russia. The population was 199 as of 2010. There are 4 streets.

== Geography ==
Volnaya Artyomovka is located on the Poboyka River, 15 km south of Sudogda (the district's administrative centre) by road. Daniltsevo is the nearest rural locality.
