= Ilyino, Sudogodsky District, Vladimir Oblast =

Ilyino Ильино
- Village
- Location within Vladimir Oblast Location within Russia
- Coordinates: 55°54′N 40°36′E
- Country: Russia
- Region: Vladimir Oblast
- District: Sudogodsky District
- Time zone: UTC+3:00

Ilyino (Russian: Ильино) is a rural locality (a village) in Golovinskoye Rural Settlement, Sudogodsky District, Vladimir Oblast, Russia. The population was 408 as of 2010. There are 5 streets.

== Geography ==
Ilyino is located 23 km west of Sudogda (the district's administrative centre) by road. Burlygino is the nearest rural locality.
