= Ladoga, Vladimir Oblast =

Ladoga Ладога
- Village
- Location within Vladimir Oblast Location within Russia
- Coordinates: 56°03′N 40°26′E
- Country: Russia
- Region: Vladimir Oblast
- District: Sudogodsky District
- Time zone: UTC+3:00

Ladoga (Russian: Ладога) is a rural locality (a village) in Vyatkinskoye Rural Settlement, Sudogodsky District, Vladimir Oblast, Russia. The population was 1 as of 2010. There are 2 streets.

== Geography ==
Ladoga is located 5 km north of Sudogda (the district's administrative centre) by road. Lavrovo is the nearest rural locality.
