= Lukhtonovo =

Lukhtonovo Лухтоново
- Village
- Location within Vladimir Oblast Location within Russia
- Coordinates: 56°02′N 40°50′E
- Country: Russia
- Region: Vladimir Oblast
- District: Sudogodsky District
- Time zone: UTC+3:00

Lukhtonovo (Russian: Лухтоново) is a rural locality (a village) in the Lavrovskoye Rural Settlement, Sudogodsky District, Vladimir Oblast, Russia. The population was 171 as of 2010. There are 4 streets.

== Geography ==
Lukhtonovo is located on the Sudogda River, 11 km north of Sudogda (the district's administrative centre) by road. Bykovo is the nearest rural locality.
