= Maryukhino =

Maryukhino Марюхино
- Village
- Location within Vladimir Oblast Location within Russia
- Coordinates: 55°57′N 40°24′E
- Country: Russia
- Region: Vladimir Oblast
- District: Sudogodsky District
- Time zone: UTC+3:00

Maryukhino (Russian: Марюхино) is a rural locality (a village) in Golovinskoye Rural Settlement, Sudogodsky District, Vladimir Oblast, Russia. The population was 8 as of 2010.

== Geography ==
Maryukhino is located on the Pol River, 34 km west of Sudogda (the district's administrative centre) by road. Rogovo is the nearest rural locality.
