= Novo-Petrovo =

Novo-Petrovo Ново-Петрово
- Village
- Location within Vladimir Oblast Location within Russia
- Coordinates: 56°02′N 40°40′E
- Country: Russia
- Region: Vladimir Oblast
- District: Sudogodsky District
- Time zone: UTC+3:00

Novo-Petrovo (Russian: Ново-Петрово) is a rural locality (a village) in Vyatkinskoye Rural Settlement, Sudogodsky District, Vladimir Oblast, Russia. The population was 208 as of 2010. There are 3 streets.

== Geography ==
Novo-Petrovo is located 23 km northwest of Sudogda (the district's administrative centre) by road. Stanki is the nearest rural locality.
