= Soyma =

Soyma Сойма
- Village
- Location within Vladimir Oblast Location within Russia
- Coordinates: 55°58′N 40°43′E
- Country: Russia
- Region: Vladimir Oblast
- District: Sudogodsky District
- Time zone: UTC+3:00

Soyma (Russian: Сойма) is a rural locality (a village) in Golovinskoye Rural Settlement, Sudogodsky District, Vladimir Oblast, Russia. The population was 391 as of 2010. There are 6 streets.

== Geography ==
Soyma is located on the Soyma River, 10 km northwest of Sudogda (the district's administrative centre) by road. Penki is the nearest rural locality.
