= Malaya Kozlovka =

Malaya Kozlovka Малая Козловка
- Village
- Location within Vladimir Oblast Location within Russia
- Coordinates: 55°56′N 41°00′E
- Country: Russia
- Region: Vladimir Oblast
- District: Sudogodsky District
- Time zone: UTC+3:00

Malaya Kozlovka (Russian: Малая Козловка) is a rural locality (a village) in Lavrovskoye Rural Settlement, Sudogodsky District, Vladimir Oblast, Russia. The population was 5 as of 2010.

== Geography ==
Malaya Kozlovka is located 11 km east of Sudogda (the district's administrative centre) by road. Kolesnya is the nearest rural locality.
