= Posyolok imeni Vorovskogo =

Posyolok imeni Vorovskogo Посёлок имени Воровского
- Settlement
- Location within Vladimir Oblast Location within Russia
- Coordinates: 55°43′N 41°07′E
- Country: Russia
- Region: Vladimir Oblast
- District: Sudogodsky District
- Time zone: UTC+3:00

Posyolok imeni Vorovskogo (Russian: Посёлок имени Воровского) is a rural locality (a settlement) in Moshokskoye Rural Settlement, Sudogodsky District, Vladimir Oblast, Russia. The population was 2,048 as of 2010. There are 18 streets.

== Geography ==
The settlement is located 45 km southeast of Sudogda (the district's administrative centre) by road. Yazvitsy is the nearest rural locality.
