= Komary, Vladimir Oblast =

Komary Комары
- Village
- Location within Vladimir Oblast Location within Russia
- Coordinates: 55°59′N 40°30′E
- Country: Russia
- Region: Vladimir Oblast
- District: Sudogodsky District
- Time zone: UTC+3:00

Komary (Russian: Комары) is a rural locality (a village) in Golovinskoye Rural Settlement, Sudogodsky District, Vladimir Oblast, Russia. The population was 6 as of 2010.

== Geography ==
Komary is located 27 km northwest of Sudogda (the district's administrative centre) by road. Lukinskogo doma invalidov is the nearest rural locality.
