= Gonobilovo =

Gonobilovo Гонобилово
- Village
- Location within Vladimir Oblast Location within Russia
- Coordinates: 55°48′N 41°19′E
- Country: Russia
- Region: Vladimir Oblast
- District: Sudogodsky District
- Time zone: UTC+3:00

Gonobilovo (Russian: Гонобилово) is a rural locality (a village) in Moshokskoye Rural Settlement, Sudogodsky District, Vladimir Oblast, Russia. The population was 250 as of 2010. There are 2 streets.

== Geography ==
Gonobilovo is located on the Kostyanka River, 40 km southeast of Sudogda (the district's administrative centre) by road. Shustovo is the nearest rural locality.
