= Goryachevo =

Goryachevo Горячево
- Village
- Location within Vladimir Oblast Location within Russia
- Coordinates: 55°45′N 41°18′E
- Country: Russia
- Region: Vladimir Oblast
- District: Sudogodsky District
- Time zone: UTC+3:00

Goryachevo (Russian: Горячево) is a rural locality (a village) in Moshokskoye Rural Settlement, Sudogodsky District, Vladimir Oblast, Russia. The population was 15 as of 2010.

== Geography ==
Goryachevo is located 41 km southeast of Sudogda (the district's administrative centre) by road. Kolychevo is the nearest rural locality.
