= Gladyshevo =

Gladyshevo Гладышево
- Village
- Location within Vladimir Oblast Location within Russia
- Coordinates: 55°49′N 41°07′E
- Country: Russia
- Region: Vladimir Oblast
- District: Sudogodsky District
- Time zone: UTC+3:00

Gladyshevo (Russian: Гладышево) is a rural locality (a village) in Moshokskoye Rural Settlement, Sudogodsky District, Vladimir Oblast, Russia. The population was 58 as of 2010.

== Geography ==
Gladyshevo is located 40 km southeast of Sudogda (the district's administrative centre) by road. Kondryayevo is the nearest rural locality.
