= Kudryavtsevo, Sudogodsky District, Vladimir Oblast =

Kudryavtsevo Кудрявцево
- Village
- Location within Vladimir Oblast Location within Russia
- Coordinates: 55°51′N 40°44′E
- Country: Russia
- Region: Vladimir Oblast
- District: Sudogodsky District
- Time zone: UTC+3:00

Kudryavtsevo (Russian: Кудрявцево) is a rural locality (a village) in Muromtsevskoye Rural Settlement, Sudogodsky District, Vladimir Oblast, Russia. The population was 7 as of 2010.

== Geography ==
Kudryavtsevo is located 17 km southwest of Sudogda (the district's administrative centre) by road. Klavdino is the nearest rural locality.
