= Trukhachyovo =

Trukhachyovo Трухачёво
- Village
- Location within Vladimir Oblast Location within Russia
- Coordinates: 56°06′N 40°47′E
- Country: Russia
- Region: Vladimir Oblast
- District: Sudogodsky District
- Time zone: UTC+3:00

Trukhachyovo (Russian: Трухачёво) is a rural locality (a village) in Lavrovskoye Rural Settlement, Sudogodsky District, Vladimir Oblast, Russia. The population was 5 as of 2010.

== Geography ==
Trukhachyovo is located on the Sudogda River, 20 km north of Sudogda (the district's administrative centre) by road. Isakovo is the nearest rural locality.
