= Kamenets, Vladimir Oblast =

Kamenets Каменец
- Village
- Location within Vladimir Oblast Location within Russia
- Coordinates: 55°55′N 40°25′E
- Country: Russia
- Region: Vladimir Oblast
- District: Sudogodsky District
- Time zone: UTC+3:00

Kamenets (Russian: Каменец) is a rural locality (a village) in Golovinskoye Rural Settlement, Sudogodsky District, Vladimir Oblast, Russia. The population was 46 as of 2010.

== Geography ==
Kamenets is located 32 km west of Sudogda (the district's administrative centre) by road. Golovino is the nearest rural locality.
