= Vyatkino =

Vyatkino Вяткино
- Settlement
- Location within Vladimir Oblast Location within Russia
- Coordinates: 56°03′N 40°29′E
- Country: Russia
- Region: Vladimir Oblast
- District: Sudogodsky District
- Time zone: UTC+3:00

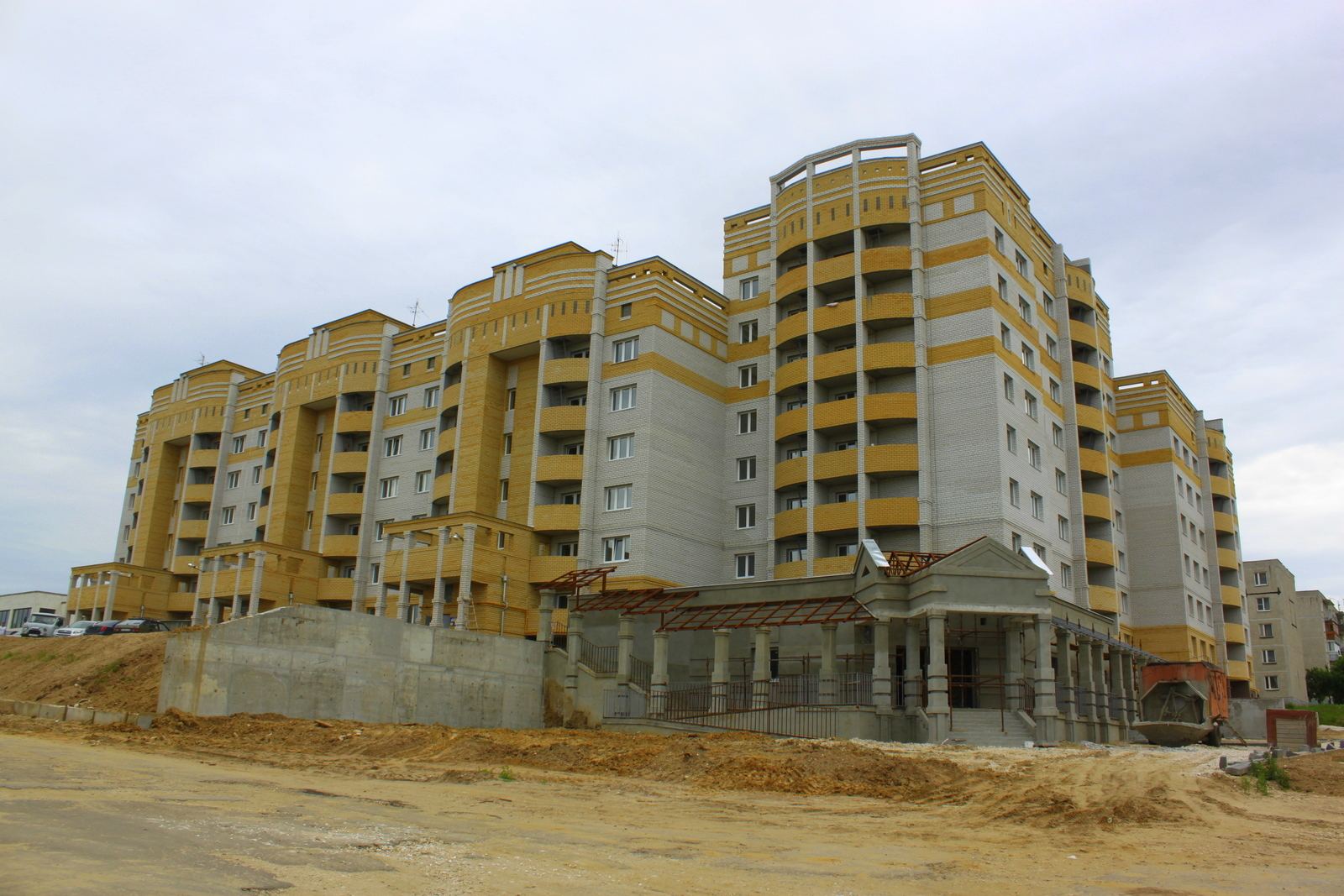
Vyatkino

Vyatkino (Russian: Вяткино) is a rural locality (a settlement) and the administrative center of Vyatkinskoye Rural Settlement, Sudogodsky District, Vladimir Oblast, Russia. The population was 1,338 as of 2010. There are 20 streets.

== Geography ==
Vyatkino is located 34 km northwest of Sudogda (the district's administrative centre) by road. Pogrebishchi is the nearest rural locality.
