= Natalyinka =

Natalyinka Натальинка
- Village
- Location within Vladimir Oblast Location within Russia
- Coordinates: 56°04′N 40°44′E
- Country: Russia
- Region: Vladimir Oblast
- District: Sudogodsky District
- Time zone: UTC+3:00

Natalyinka (Russian: Натальинка) is a rural locality (a village) in Lavrovskoye Rural Settlement, Sudogodsky District, Vladimir Oblast, Russia. The population was 12 as of 2010.

== Geography ==
Natalyinka is located 19 km northwest of Sudogda (the district's administrative centre) by road. Aksenovo is the nearest rural locality.
