= Khokhlachi =

Khokhlachi Хохлачи
- Village
- Location within Vladimir Oblast Location within Russia
- Coordinates: 55°59′N 40°44′E
- Country: Russia
- Region: Vladimir Oblast
- District: Sudogodsky District
- Time zone: UTC+3:00

Khokhlachi (Russian: Хохлачи) is a rural locality (a village) in Golovinskoye Rural Settlement, Sudogodsky District, Vladimir Oblast, Russia. The population was 42 as of 2010.

== Geography ==
Khokhlachi is located on the Soyma River, 13 km northwest of Sudogda (the district's administrative centre) by road. Ovtsyno is the nearest rural locality.
