= Alfyorovo (Golovinskoye Rural Settlement), Sudogodsky District, Vladimir Oblast =

Alfyorovo Алфёрово
- Village
- Location within Vladimir Oblast Location within Russia
- Coordinates: 55°57′N 40°27′E
- Country: Russia
- Region: Vladimir Oblast
- District: Sudogodsky District
- Time zone: UTC+3:00

Alfyorovo (Russian: Алфёрово) is a rural locality (a village) in Golovinskoye Rural Settlement, Sudogodsky District, Vladimir Oblast, Russia. The population was 16 as of 2010.

== Geography ==
The village is located 1.5 km north-east from Golovino, 29 km west from Sudogda.
