= Starikovo =

Starikovo Стариково
- Village
- Location within Vladimir Oblast Location within Russia
- Coordinates: 55°55′N 40°25′E
- Country: Russia
- Region: Vladimir Oblast
- District: Sudogodsky District
- Time zone: UTC+3:00

Starikovo (Russian: Стариково) is a rural locality (a village) in Golovinskoye Rural Settlement, Sudogodsky District, Vladimir Oblast, Russia. The population was 8 as of 2010.

== Geography ==
Starikovo is located 34 km west of Sudogda (the district's administrative centre) by road. Kamenets is the nearest rural locality.
