= Bashevo, Vladimir Oblast =

Bashevo Башево
- Village
- Location within Vladimir Oblast Location within Russia
- Coordinates: 55°55′N 40°51′E
- Country: Russia
- Region: Vladimir Oblast
- District: Sudogodsky District
- Time zone: UTC+3:00

Bashevo (Russian: Башево) is a rural locality (a village) in Muromtsevskoye Rural Settlement, Sudogodsky District, Vladimir Oblast, Russia. The population was 20 as of 2010.

== Geography ==
Bashevo is located on the Sudogda River, 5 km south of Sudogda (the district's administrative centre) by road. Berezhki is the nearest rural locality.
