= Borisogleb, Sudogodsky District, Vladimir Oblast =

Borisogleb Борисоглеб
- Selo
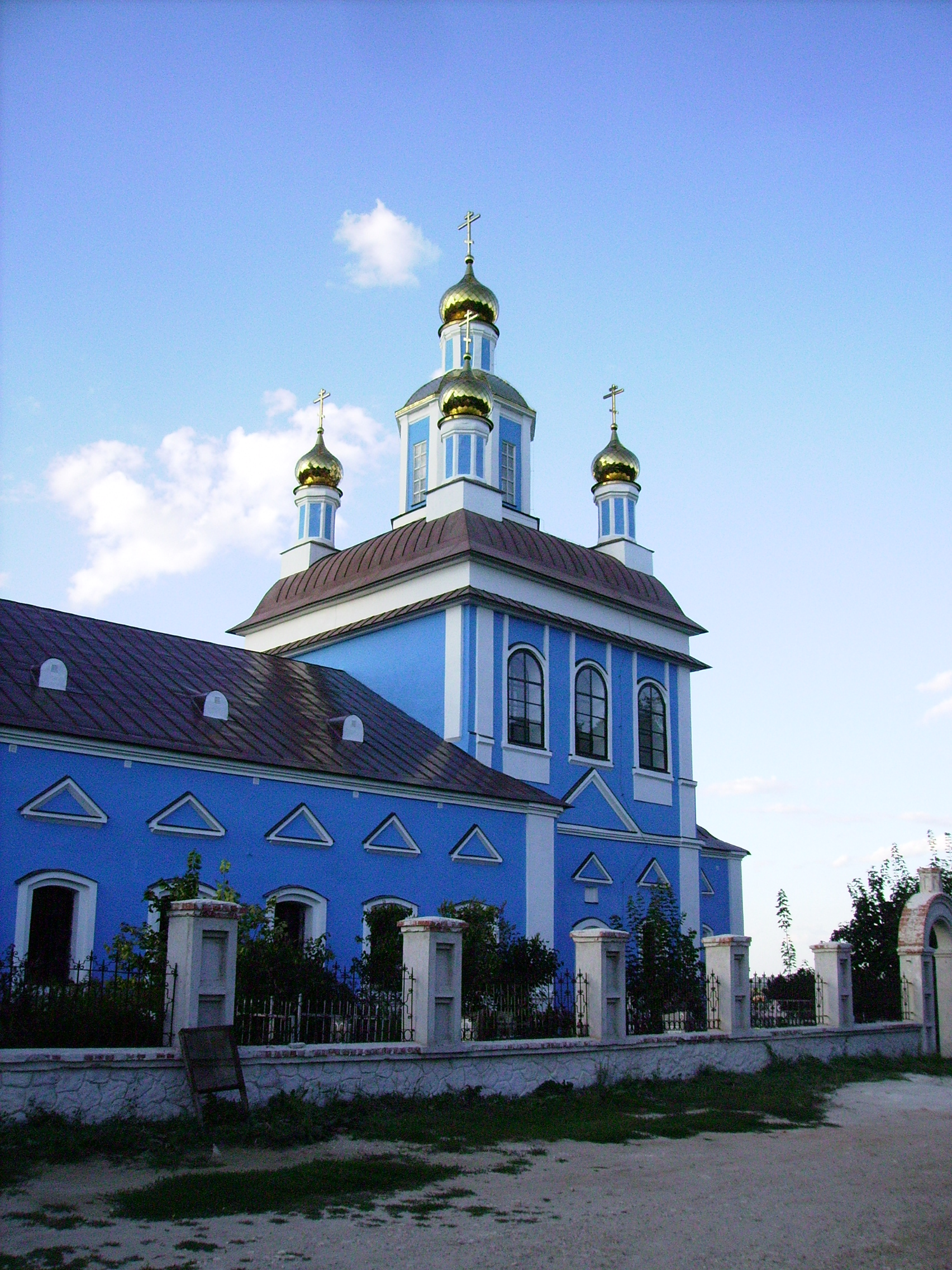
- Borisoglebskaya Church (2011)

- Location within Vladimir Oblast Location within Russia
- Coordinates: 56°00′N 40°21′E
- Country: Russia
- Region: Vladimir Oblast
- District: Sudogodsky District
- Time zone: UTC+3:00

Borisogleb (Russian: Борисоглеб) is a rural locality (a selo) in Vyatkinskoye Rural Settlement, Sudogodsky District, Vladimir Oblast, Russia. The population was 2 as of 2010.

== Geography ==
Borisogleb is located 48 km northwest of Sudogda (the district's administrative centre) by road. Konyushino is the nearest rural locality.
