= Fryazino, Vladimir Oblast =

Fryazino Фрязино
- Village
- Location within Vladimir Oblast Location within Russia
- Coordinates: 56°02′N 40°17′E
- Country: Russia
- Region: Vladimir Oblast
- District: Sudogodsky District
- Time zone: UTC+3:00

Fryazino (Russian: Фрязино) is a rural locality (a village) in Vyatkinskoye Rural Settlement, Sudogodsky District, Vladimir Oblast, Russia. The population was 29 as of 2010.

== Geography ==
Fryazino is located 48 km northwest of Sudogda (the district's administrative centre) by road. Korostelevo is the nearest rural locality.
