= Bolotsky, Sudogodsky District, Vladimir Oblast =

Bolotsky Болотский
- Settlement
- Location within Vladimir Oblast Location within Russia
- Coordinates: 55°58′N 41°07′E
- Country: Russia
- Region: Vladimir Oblast
- District: Sudogodsky District
- Time zone: UTC+3:00

Bolotsky (Russian: Болотский) is a rural locality (a settlement) in Andreyevskoye Rural Settlement, Sudogodsky District, Vladimir Oblast, Russia. The population was 694 as of 2010. There are 13 streets.

== Geography ==
Bolotsky is located 24 km east of Sudogda (the district's administrative centre) by road. Andreyevo is the nearest rural locality.
