= Rayki, Russia =

Rayki Райки
- Village
- Location within Vladimir Oblast Location within Russia
- Coordinates: 55°53′N 40°50′E
- Country: Russia
- Region: Vladimir Oblast
- District: Sudogodsky District
- Time zone: UTC+3:00

Rayki (Russian: Райки) is a rural locality (a village) in Muromtsevskoye Rural Settlement, Sudogodsky District, Vladimir Oblast, Russia. The population was 22 as of 2010.

== Geography ==
Rayki is located on the Sudogda River, 8 km south of Sudogda (the district's administrative centre) by road. Berezhki is the nearest rural locality.
