= Rayki =

Rayki may refer to:

- Rayki, Russia, a village near Vladimir
- Rayki, Ukraine, a village near Zhytomyr, eponym of the Luka-Raikovetska culture
