= Ovsyanikovo =

Ovsyanikovo Овсяниково
- Village
- Location within Vladimir Oblast Location within Russia
- Coordinates: 55°50′N 40°54′E
- Country: Russia
- Region: Vladimir Oblast
- District: Sudogodsky District
- Time zone: UTC+3:00

Ovsyanikovo (Russian: Овсяниково) is a rural locality (a village) in Muromtsevskoye Rural Settlement, Sudogodsky District, Vladimir Oblast, Russia. The population was 34 as of 2010.
