= Bolotsky, Kovrovsky District, Vladimir Oblast =

Bolotsky Болотский
- Settlement
- Location within Vladimir Oblast Location within Russia
- Coordinates: 56°00′N 41°18′E
- Country: Russia
- Region: Vladimir Oblast
- District: Kovrovsky District
- Time zone: UTC+3:00

Bolotsky (Russian: Болотский) is a rural locality (a settlement) in Ivanovskoye Rural Settlement, Kovrovsky District, Vladimir Oblast, Russia. The population was 302 as of 2010.

== Geography ==
Bolotsky is located 51 km south of Kovrov (the district's administrative centre) by road. Yazykovo is the nearest rural locality.
