= Sudogda =

Town in Vladimir Oblast, Russia

Sudogda Судогда
- Town
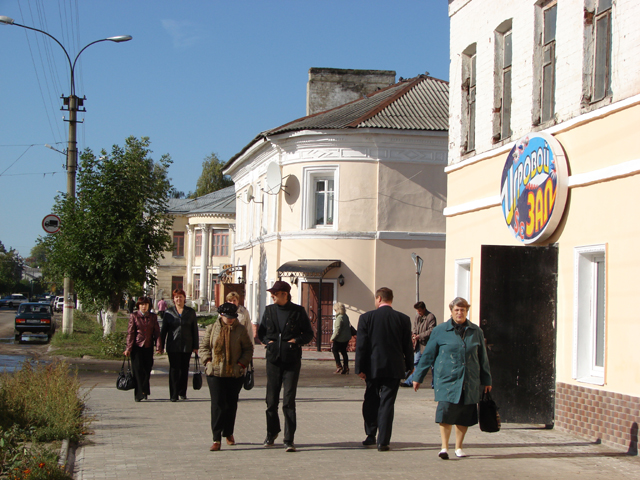
- In central Sudogda

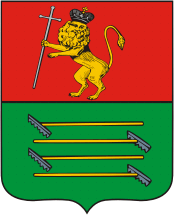
- Coat of arms
- Interactive map of Sudogda
- Location of Sudogda Sudogda (Vladimir Oblast)
- Coordinates: 55°57′N 40°52′E
- Country: Russia
- Federal subject: Vladimir Oblast
- Administrative district: Sudogodsky District
- First mentioned: 17th century
- Town status since: 1778
- Elevation: 100 m (330 ft)

Population (2010 Census)
  - Total: 11,848
  - Estimate (2021): 10,408 (−12.2%)

Administrative status
  - Capital of: Sudogodsky District

Municipal status
  - Municipal district: Sudogodsky Municipal District
  - Urban settlement: Sudogda Urban Settlement
  - Capital of: Sudogodsky Municipal District, Sudogda Urban Settlement
- Time zone: UTC+3 (MSK)
- Postal code: 601350
- OKTMO ID: 17652101001
- Website: www.sudogdagorod.ru

Sudogda (Russian: Су́догда) is a town and the administrative center of Sudogodsky District in Vladimir Oblast, Russia, located on the left bank of the river Sudogda (Klyazma's tributary) 40 kilometers (25 mi) southeast of Vladimir, the administrative center of the oblast. Population: 10,408 (2021 census); 11,848 (2010 census); 13,328 (2002 census); 14,191 (1989 Soviet census).

== History ==
First mentioned in the 17th century documents as the sloboda of Sudogodskaya (Судогодская), it was later known as the selo of Sudogda. Town status was granted to it in 1778.

== Administrative and municipal status ==
Within the framework of administrative divisions, Sudogda serves as the administrative center of Sudogodsky District, to which it is directly subordinated. As a municipal division, the town of Sudogda is incorporated within Sudogodsky Municipal District as Sudogda Urban Settlement.
