= Sudogodsky District =

Sudogodsky District Судогодский район (Russian)
- District
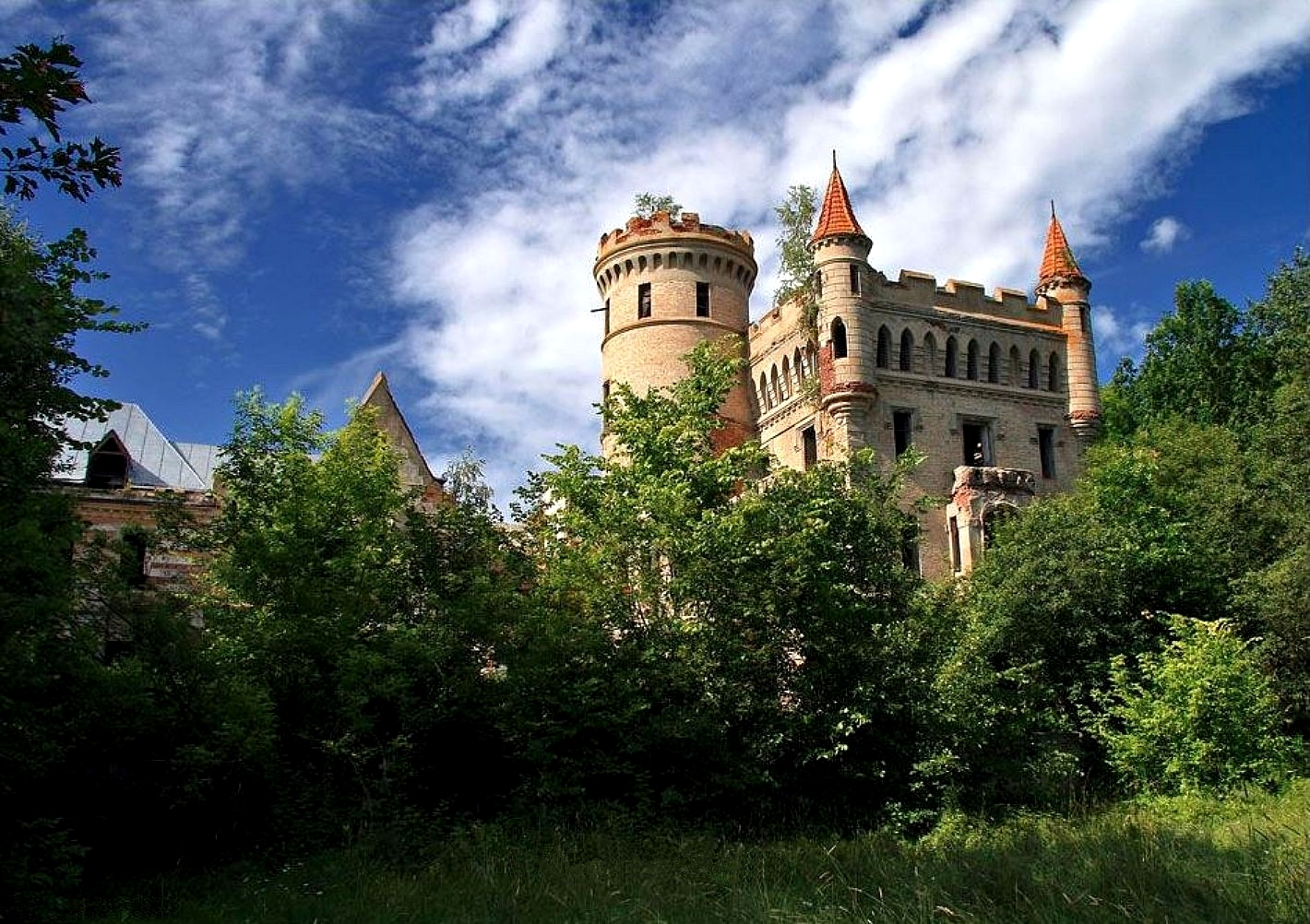
- Remains of Muromtsevo Estate

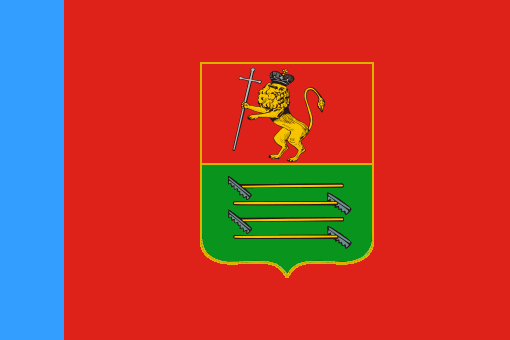
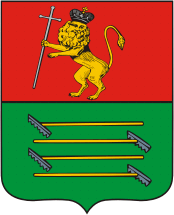
- Flag Coat of arms
- Location of Sudogodsky District in Vladimir Oblast
- Coordinates: 55°57′N 40°52′E
- Country: Russia
- Federal subject: Vladimir Oblast
- Established: 10 April 1929
- Administrative center: Sudogda

Area
  - Total: 1,616 km^{2} (624 sq mi)

Population (2010 Census)
  - Total: 41,177
  - Density: 25.48/km^{2} (66.00/sq mi)
  - Urban: 28.8%
  - Rural: 71.2%

Administrative structure
  - Inhabited localities: 1 cities/towns, 202 rural localities

Municipal structure
  - Municipally incorporated as: Sudogodsky Municipal District
  - Municipal divisions: 1 urban settlements, 6 rural settlements
- Time zone: UTC+3 (MSK)
- OKTMO ID: 17652000
- Website: http://admsud.avo.ru/

Sudogodsky District (Russian: Судого́дский райо́н) is an administrative and municipal district (raion), one of the sixteen in Vladimir Oblast, Russia. It is located in the center of the oblast. The area of the district is 1,616 square kilometers (624 sq mi). Its administrative center is the town of Sudogda. Population: 35,529 (2021 census); 41,177 (2010 census); 44,429 (2002 Census); 45,946 (1989 Soviet census). The population of Sudogda accounts for 29.3% of the district's total population.
