= Churilovo =

Churayevo may refer to:

- Churilovo, Bulgaria, a village in Blagoevgrad Province
- Churilovo, Kharovsky District, Vologda Oblast, a rural locality in Russia
- Churilovo, Kursky District, Kursk Oblast, a rural locality in Russia
- Churilovo, Sheksninsky District, Vologda Oblast, a rural locality in Russia
- Churilovo, Sobinsky District, Vladimir Oblast, a rural locality in Russia
