= Parfentyevo =

Parfentyevo Парфентьево
- Village
- Location within Vladimir Oblast Location within Russia
- Coordinates: 56°03′N 40°09′E
- Country: Russia
- Region: Vladimir Oblast
- District: Sobinsky District
- Time zone: UTC+3:00

Parfentyevo (Russian: Парфентьево) is a rural locality (a village) in Kolokshanskoye Rural Settlement, Sobinsky District, Vladimir Oblast, Russia. The population was 98 as of 2010.

== Geography ==
Parfentyevo is located 16 km northeast of Sobinka (the district's administrative centre) by road. Koloksha is the nearest rural locality.
