= Voshilovo =

Voshilovo Вошилово
- Village
- Location within Vladimir Oblast Location within Russia
- Coordinates: 55°57′N 40°14′E
- Country: Russia
- Region: Vladimir Oblast
- District: Sobinsky District
- Time zone: UTC+3:00

Voshilovo (Russian: Вошилово) is a rural locality (a village) in Aserkhovskoye Rural Settlement, Sobinsky District, Vladimir Oblast, Russia. The population was 5 as of 2010.

== Geography ==
Voshilovo is located 18 km southeast of Sobinka (the district's administrative centre) by road. Aserkhovo is the nearest rural locality.
