= Ivlevo =

Ivlevo Ивлево
- Village
- Location within Vladimir Oblast Location within Russia
- Coordinates: 56°03′N 40°10′E
- Country: Russia
- Region: Vladimir Oblast
- District: Sobinsky District
- Time zone: UTC+3:00

Ivlevo (Russian: Ивлево) is a rural locality (a village) in Kolokshanskoye Rural Settlement, Sobinsky District, Vladimir Oblast, Russia. The population was 14 as of 2010.

== Geography ==
Ivlevo is located on the Klyazma River, 19 km northeast of Sobinka (the district's administrative centre) by road. Baranniki is the nearest rural locality.
