= Tolpukhovo =

Tolpukhovo Толпухово
- Village
- Location within Vladimir Oblast Location within Russia
- Coordinates: 56°08′N 40°02′E
- Country: Russia
- Region: Vladimir Oblast
- District: Sobinsky District
- Time zone: UTC+3:00

Tolpukhovo (Russian: Толпухово) is a rural locality (a village) and the administrative center of Tolpukhovskoye Rural Settlement, Sobinsky District, Vladimir Oblast, Russia. The population was 782 as of 2010. There are 16 streets.

== Geography ==
Tolpukhovo is located 22 km north of Sobinka (the district's administrative centre) by road. Ryzhkovo is the nearest rural locality.
