= Pesteryugino =

Pesteryugino Пестерюгино
- Village
- Location within Vladimir Oblast Location within Russia
- Coordinates: 56°06′N 39°59′E
- Country: Russia
- Region: Vladimir Oblast
- District: Sobinsky District
- Time zone: UTC+3:00

Pesteryugino (Russian: Пестерюгино) is a rural locality (a village) in Kurilovskoye Rural Settlement, Sobinsky District, Vladimir Oblast, Russia. The population was 1 as of 2010.

== Geography ==
Pesteryugino is located 17 km north of Sobinka (the district's administrative centre) by road. Stavrovo is the nearest rural locality.

== History ==
In the late 19th and early 20th centuries, the village was a part of Kuznetsovsky volost of Vladimir uyezd. Since 1924 it has been a part of Stavrovskaya volost. In 1859 there were 38 households in the village, in 1905, 60 households, and in 1926, 51 households.

Starting in 1929, the village was the centre of the Pesteruginsky village council of the Stavrovsky district. In 1932, it became part of the Yurovsky village council of the Sobinsky district. In 1945 the village was again in the Stavrovsky district, which changed again 1965 as it became part of the Sobinsky district. Since 1976 it has been part of the Kurilovsky village council, and since 2005 Kurilovsky rural settlement.
