= Sergeyevo, Sobinsky District, Vladimir Oblast =

Sergeyevo Сергеево
- Village
- Location within Vladimir Oblast Location within Russia
- Coordinates: 56°04′N 39°55′E
- Country: Russia
- Region: Vladimir Oblast
- District: Sobinsky District
- Time zone: UTC+3:00

Sergeyevo (Russian: Сергеево) is a rural locality (a village) in Kurilovskoye Rural Settlement, Sobinsky District, Vladimir Oblast, Russia. The population was 4 in 2010.

== Geography ==
Sergeyevo is located on the Vorsha River, 14 km northwest of Sobinka (the district's administrative centre) by road. Rybkhoz Vorsha is the nearest rural locality.
