= Maximikha, Vladimir Oblast =

Maximikha Максимиха
- Village
- Location within Vladimir Oblast Location within Russia
- Coordinates: 55°50′N 40°08′E
- Country: Russia
- Region: Vladimir Oblast
- District: Sobinsky District
- Time zone: UTC+3:00

Maximikha (Russian: Максимиха) is a rural locality (a village) in Bereznikovskoye Rural Settlement, Sobinsky District, Vladimir Oblast, Russia. The population was 13 as of 2010.

== Geography ==
Maximikha is located 28 km southeast of Sobinka (the district's administrative centre) by road. Kosmino is the nearest rural locality.
