= Stolbishchi =

Stolbishchi Столбищи
- Village
- Location within Vladimir Oblast Location within Russia
- Coordinates: 56°03′N 40°02′E
- Country: Russia
- Region: Vladimir Oblast
- District: Sobinsky District
- Time zone: UTC+3:00

Stolbishchi (Russian: Столбищи) is a rural locality (a village) in Vorshinskoye Rural Settlement, Sobinsky District, Vladimir Oblast, Russia. The population was 6 as of 2010.

== Geography ==
Stolbishchi is located on the Vorsha River, 18 km northeast of Sobinka (the district's administrative centre) by road. Dubrovka is the nearest rural locality.
