= Pushnino (Bereznikovskoye Rural Settlement), Sobinsky District, Vladimir Oblast =

Pushnino Пушнино
- Village
- Location within Vladimir Oblast Location within Russia
- Coordinates: 55°48′N 40°01′E
- Country: Russia
- Region: Vladimir Oblast
- District: Sobinsky District
- Time zone: UTC+3:00

Pushnino (Russian: Пушнино) is a rural locality (a village) in Bereznikovskoye Rural Settlement, Sobinsky District, Vladimir Oblast, Russia. The population was 14 as of 2010.

== Geography ==
The village is located 10 km south-west from Berezniki, 28 km south from Sobinka.
