= Kosmino, Vladimir Oblast =

Kosmino Косьмино
- Village
- Location within Vladimir Oblast Location within Russia
- Coordinates: 55°49′N 40°09′E
- Country: Russia
- Region: Vladimir Oblast
- District: Sobinsky District
- Time zone: UTC+3:00

Kosmino (Russian: Косьмино) is a rural locality (a village) in Bereznikovskoye Rural Settlement, Sobinsky District, Vladimir Oblast, Russia. The population was 6 as of 2010.

== Geography ==
Kosmino is located 29 km southeast of Sobinka (the district's administrative centre) by road. Turovo is the nearest rural locality.
