= Astafyevo =

Astafyevo Астафьево
- Village
- Location within Vladimir Oblast Location within Russia
- Coordinates: 56°06′N 40°03′E
- Country: Russia
- Region: Vladimir Oblast
- District: Sobinsky District
- Time zone: UTC+3:00

Astafyevo (Russian: Астафьево) is a rural locality (a village) in Vorshinskoye Rural Settlement, Sobinsky District, Vladimir Oblast, Russia. The population was 15 as of 2010.

== Geography ==
Astafyevo is located 27 km northeast of Sobinka (the district's administrative centre) by road. Yerosovo is the nearest rural locality.
