= Bukholovo, Sobinsky District, Vladimir Oblast =

Bukholovo Бухолово
- Village
- Location within Vladimir Oblast Location within Russia
- Coordinates: 56°16′N 40°02′E
- Country: Russia
- Region: Vladimir Oblast
- District: Sobinsky District
- Time zone: UTC+3:00

Bukholovo (Russian: Бухолово) is a rural locality (a village) in Tolpukhovskoye Rural Settlement, Sobinsky District, Vladimir Oblast, Russia. The population was 33 as of 2010. There are 3 streets.

== Geography ==
Bukholovo is located 42 km north of Sobinka (the district's administrative centre) by road. Pavlovskoye is the nearest rural locality.
