= Monakovo, Vladimir Oblast =

Monakovo Монаково
- Village
- Location within Vladimir Oblast Location within Russia
- Coordinates: 56°08′N 39°58′E
- Country: Russia
- Region: Vladimir Oblast
- District: Sobinsky District
- Time zone: UTC+3:00

Monakovo (Russian: Монаково) is a rural locality (a village) in Tolpukhovskoye Rural Settlement, Sobinsky District, Vladimir Oblast, Russia. The population was 4 as of 2010. There are 3 streets.

== Geography ==
Monakovo is located 20 km north of Sobinka (the district's administrative centre) by road. Stavrovo is the nearest rural locality.
