= Nikulino (Tolpukhovskoye Rural Settlement), Sobinsky District, Vladimir Oblast =

Nikulino Никулино
- Village
- Location within Vladimir Oblast Location within Russia
- Coordinates: 56°08′N 39°56′E
- Country: Russia
- Region: Vladimir Oblast
- District: Sobinsky District
- Time zone: UTC+3:00

Nikulino (Russian: Никулино) is a rural locality (a village) in Tolpukhovskoye Rural Settlement, Sobinsky District, Vladimir Oblast, Russia. The population was 5 as of 2010.

== Geography ==
The village is located 5 km south-west from Tolpukhovo, 19 km north from Sobinka.
