= Ugor, Vladimir Oblast =

Ugor Угор
- Village
- Location within Vladimir Oblast Location within Russia
- Coordinates: 56°02′N 40°08′E
- Country: Russia
- Region: Vladimir Oblast
- District: Sobinsky District
- Time zone: UTC+3:00

Ugor (Russian: Угор) is a rural locality (a village) in Vorshinskoye Rural Settlement, Sobinsky District, Vladimir Oblast, Russia. The population was 221 as of 2010. There are 5 streets.

== Geography ==
Ugor is located on the Koloksha River, 16 km northeast of Sobinka (the district's administrative centre) by road. Khryastovo is the nearest rural locality.
