= Fyodorovka, Sobinsky District, Vladimir Oblast =

Fyodorovka Фёдоровка
- Village
- Location within Vladimir Oblast Location within Russia
- Coordinates: 56°03′N 39°57′E
- Country: Russia
- Region: Vladimir Oblast
- District: Sobinsky District
- Time zone: UTC+3:00

Fyodorovka (Russian: Фёдоровка) is a rural locality (a village) in Kurilovskoye Rural Settlement, Sobinsky District, Vladimir Oblast, Russia. The population was 13 as of 2010.

== Geography ==
Fyodorovka is located 14 km northwest of Sobinka (the district's administrative centre) by road. Uvarovo is the nearest rural locality.
