= Goryamino =

Goryamino Горямино
- Village
- Location within Vladimir Oblast Location within Russia
- Coordinates: 56°11′N 39°48′E
- Country: Russia
- Region: Vladimir Oblast
- District: Sobinsky District
- Time zone: UTC+3:00

Goryamino (Russian: Горямино) is a rural locality (a village) in Cherkutinskoye Rural Settlement, Sobinsky District, Vladimir Oblast, Russia. The population was 1 as of 2010.

== Geography ==
Goryamino is located on the Vorsha River, 33 km northwest of Sobinka (the district's administrative centre) by road. Demikhovo is the nearest rural locality.
