= Yermonino =

Yermonino Ермонино
- Village
- Location within Vladimir Oblast Location within Russia
- Coordinates: 56°08′N 39°57′E
- Country: Russia
- Region: Vladimir Oblast
- District: Sobinsky District
- Time zone: UTC+3:00

Yermonino (Russian: Ермонино) is a rural locality (a village) in Tolpukhovskoye Rural Settlement, Sobinsky District, Vladimir Oblast, Russia. The population was 236 as of 2010. There are 4 streets.

== Geography ==
Yermonino is located 21 km north of Sobinka (the district's administrative centre) by road. Nikulino is the nearest rural locality.
