= Kharitonovo, Vladimir Oblast =

Kharitonovo Харитоново
- Village
- Location within Vladimir Oblast Location within Russia
- Coordinates: 55°54′N 39°53′E
- Country: Russia
- Region: Vladimir Oblast
- District: Sobinsky District
- Time zone: UTC+3:00

Kharitonovo (Russian: Харитоново) is a rural locality (a village) in Kopninskoye Rural Settlement, Sobinsky District, Vladimir Oblast, Russia. The population was 7 as of 2010.

== Geography ==
Kharitonovo is located 25 km southwest of Sobinka (the district's administrative centre) by road. Fedotovo is the nearest rural locality.
