= Pasynkovo =

Pasynkovo Пасынково
- Village
- Location within Vladimir Oblast Location within Russia
- Coordinates: 56°09′N 39°47′E
- Country: Russia
- Region: Vladimir Oblast
- District: Sobinsky District
- Time zone: UTC+3:00

Pasynkovo (Russian: Пасынково) is a rural locality (a village) in Cherkutinskoye Rural Settlement, Sobinsky District, Vladimir Oblast, Russia. The population was 1 as of 2010.

== Geography ==
Pasynkovo is located 37 km northwest of Sobinka (the district's administrative centre) by road. Volkovo is the nearest rural locality.
