= Kudelino =

Kudelino Куделино
- Village
- Location within Vladimir Oblast Location within Russia
- Coordinates: 56°11′N 39°48′E
- Country: Russia
- Region: Vladimir Oblast
- District: Sobinsky District
- Time zone: UTC+3:00

Kudelino (Russian: Куделино) is a rural locality (a village) in Rozhdestvenskoye Rural Settlement, Sobinsky District, Vladimir Oblast, Russia. The locality's population was 3 as of 2010.

== Geography ==
Kudelino is located on the Vorsha River, 33 km northwest of Sobinka (the district's administrative centre) by road. Demikhovo is the nearest rural locality.
