= Konino =

Konino Конино
- Village
- Location within Vladimir Oblast Location within European Russia Location within Russia
- Coordinates: 56°02′N 40°05′E
- Country: Russia
- Region: Vladimir Oblast
- District: Sobinsky District
- Time zone: UTC+3:00

Konino (Russian: Конино) is a rural locality (a village) in Vorshinskoye Rural Settlement, Sobinsky District, Vladimir Oblast, Russia. The population was 146 as of 2010. There are 4 streets.

== Geography ==
Konino is located on the right bank of the Vorsha River, 12 km northeast of Sobinka (the district's administrative centre) by road. Kuzmino is the nearest rural locality.
