= Gnusovo =

Gnusovo Гнусово
- Village
- Location within Vladimir Oblast Location within Russia
- Coordinates: 56°00′N 39°52′E
- Country: Russia
- Region: Vladimir Oblast
- District: Sobinsky District
- Time zone: UTC+3:00

Gnusovo (Russian: Гнусово) is a rural locality (a village) in Kopninskoye Rural Settlement, Sobinsky District, Vladimir Oblast, Russia. The population was 23 as of 2010.

== Geography ==
Gnusovo is located 15 km northwest of Sobinka (the district's administrative centre) by road. Omoforovo is the nearest rural locality.
