= Baranniki =

Baranniki Баранники
- Village
- Location within Vladimir Oblast Location within Russia
- Coordinates: 56°03′N 40°09′E
- Country: Russia
- Region: Vladimir Oblast
- District: Sobinsky District
- Time zone: UTC+3:00

Baranniki (Russian: Баранники) is a rural locality (a village) in Kolokshanskoye Rural Settlement, Sobinsky District, Vladimir Oblast, Russia. The population was 6 as of 2010. Baranniki is located 27 km northeast of Sobinka (the district's administrative centre) by road. Ivlevo is the nearest rural locality.
