= Khrenovo (Kurilovskoye Rural Settlement), Sobinsky District, Vladimir Oblast =

Khrenovo Хреново
- Village
- Location within Vladimir Oblast Location within Russia
- Coordinates: 56°07′N 39°49′E
- Country: Russia
- Region: Vladimir Oblast
- District: Sobinsky District
- Time zone: UTC+3:00

Khrenovo (Russian: Хреново) is a rural locality (a village) in Kurilovskoye Rural Settlement, Sobinsky District, Vladimir Oblast, Russia. The population was 7 as of 2010.

== Geography ==
The village is located 14 km north-west from Kurilovo, 23 km north-west from Sobinka.
