= Sulukovo =

Sulukovo Сулуково
- Village
- Location within Vladimir Oblast Location within Russia
- Coordinates: 56°09′N 40°02′E
- Country: Russia
- Region: Vladimir Oblast
- District: Sobinsky District
- Time zone: UTC+3:00

Sulukovo (Russian: Сулуково) is a rural locality (a village) in Tolpukhovskoye Rural Settlement, Sobinsky District, Vladimir Oblast, Russia. The population was 16 as of 2010. There are 5 streets.

== Geography ==
Sulukovo is located 23 km north of Sobinka (the district's administrative centre) by road. Ryzhkovo is the nearest rural locality.
