= Bratilovo =

Bratilovo Братилово
- Village
- Location within Vladimir Oblast Location within Russia
- Coordinates: 55°59′N 40°09′E
- Country: Russia
- Region: Vladimir Oblast
- District: Sobinsky District
- Time zone: UTC+3:00

Bratilovo (Russian: Братилово) is a rural locality (a village) in Aserkhovskoye Rural Settlement, Sobinsky District, Vladimir Oblast, Russia. The population was 14 as of 2010.

== Geography ==
Bratilovo is located 11 km southeast of Sobinka (the district's administrative centre) by road. Litovka is the nearest rural locality.
