= Bolshiye Ostrova =

Bolshiye Ostrova Большие Острова
- Village
- Location within Vladimir Oblast Location within Russia
- Coordinates: 55°47′N 40°09′E
- Country: Russia
- Region: Vladimir Oblast
- District: Sobinsky District
- Time zone: UTC+3:00

Bolshiye Ostrova (Russian: Большие Острова) is a rural locality (a village) in Bereznikovskoye Rural Settlement, Sobinsky District, Vladimir Oblast, Russia. The population was 16 as of 2010.

== Geography ==
Bolshiye Ostrova is located 34 km southeast of Sobinka (the district's administrative centre) by road. Malye Ostrova is the nearest rural locality.
