= Petrushino, Sobinsky District, Vladimir Oblast =

Petrushino Петрушино
- Village
- Location within Vladimir Oblast Location within Russia
- Coordinates: 55°58′N 39°55′E
- Country: Russia
- Region: Vladimir Oblast
- District: Sobinsky District
- Time zone: UTC+3:00

Petrushino (Russian: Петрушино) is a rural locality (a village) in Kopninskoye Rural Settlement, Sobinsky District, Vladimir Oblast, Russia. The population was 32 as of 2010.

== Geography ==
Petrushino is located 17 km west of Sobinka (the district's administrative centre) by road. Lapino is the nearest rural locality.
