= Burykino =

Burykino Бурыкино
- Village
- Location within Vladimir Oblast Location within Russia
- Coordinates: 56°11′N 39°56′E
- Country: Russia
- Region: Vladimir Oblast
- District: Sobinsky District
- Time zone: UTC+3:00

Burykino (Russian: Бурыкино) is a rural locality (a village) in Rozhdestvenskoye Rural Settlement, Sobinsky District, Vladimir Oblast, Russia. The population was 8 as of 2010. There are 2 streets.

== Geography ==
Burykino is located 6 km east from Rozhdestveno, 40 km north of Sobinka (the district's administrative centre) by road. Taratinka is the nearest rural locality.
