= Malye Ostrova =

Malye Ostrova Малые Острова
- Village
- Location within Vladimir Oblast Location within Russia
- Coordinates: 55°47′N 40°10′E
- Country: Russia
- Region: Vladimir Oblast
- District: Sobinsky District
- Time zone: UTC+3:00

Malye Ostrova (Russian: Малые Острова) is a rural locality (a village) in Bereznikovskoye Rural Settlement, Sobinsky District, Vladimir Oblast, Russia. The population was 8 as of 2010.

== Geography ==
Malye Ostrova is located 33 km southeast of Sobinka (the district's administrative centre) by road. Bolshiye Ostrova is the nearest rural locality.
