= Korobovo =

Korobovo Коробово
- Village
- Location within Vladimir Oblast Location within Russia
- Coordinates: 55°51′N 40°12′E
- Country: Russia
- Region: Vladimir Oblast
- District: Sobinsky District
- Time zone: UTC+3:00

Korobovo (Russian: Коробово) is a rural locality (a village) in Bereznikovskoye Rural Settlement, Sobinsky District, Vladimir Oblast, Russia. The population was 8 as of 2010.

== Geography ==
Korobovo is located 31 km southeast of Sobinka (the district's administrative centre) by road. Golovino is the nearest rural locality.
