= Taratinka =

Taratinka Таратинка
- Village
- Location within Vladimir Oblast Location within Russia
- Coordinates: 56°11′N 39°57′E
- Country: Russia
- Region: Vladimir Oblast
- District: Sobinsky District
- Time zone: UTC+3:00

Taratinka (Russian: Таратинка) is a rural locality (a village) in Tolpukhovskoye Rural Settlement, Sobinsky District, Vladimir Oblast, Russia. The population was 9 as of 2010.

== Geography ==
Taratinka is located 26 km north of Sobinka (the district's administrative centre) by road. Burykino is the nearest rural locality.
