= Perebor, Vladimir Oblast =

Perebor Перебор
- Village
- Location within Vladimir Oblast Location within Russia
- Coordinates: 55°58′N 39°58′E
- Country: Russia
- Region: Vladimir Oblast
- District: Sobinsky District
- Time zone: UTC+3:00

Perebor (Russian: Перебор) is a rural locality (a village) in Bereznikovskoye Rural Settlement, Sobinsky District, Vladimir Oblast, Russia. The population was 16 as of 2010.

== Geography ==
Perebor is located on the Klyazma River, 5 km southwest of Sobinka (the district's administrative centre) by road. Sobinka is the nearest rural locality.
