= Batyushkovo =

Batyushkovo Батюшково
- Village
- Location within Vladimir Oblast Location within Russia
- Coordinates: 56°06′N 40°08′E
- Country: Russia
- Region: Vladimir Oblast
- District: Sobinsky District
- Time zone: UTC+3:00

Batyushkovo (Russian: Батюшково) is a rural locality (a village) in Vorshinskoye Rural Settlement, Sobinsky District, Vladimir Oblast, Russia. The population was 19 as of 2010.

== Geography ==
Batyushkovo is located 28 km northeast of Sobinka (the district's administrative centre) by road. Nazarovo is the nearest rural locality.
