= Zhabino =

Zhabino Жабино
- Village
- Location within Vladimir Oblast Location within Russia
- Coordinates: 55°50′N 40°14′E
- Country: Russia
- Region: Vladimir Oblast
- District: Sobinsky District
- Time zone: UTC+3:00

Zhabino (Russian: Жабино) is a rural locality (a village) in Bereznikovskoye Rural Settlement, Sobinsky District, Vladimir Oblast, Russia. The population was 4 as of 2010.

== Geography ==
Zhabino is located 33 km southeast of Sobinka (the district's administrative centre) by road. Golovino is the nearest rural locality.
