= Kadyevo =

Kadyevo Кадыево
- Village
- Location within Vladimir Oblast Location within Russia
- Coordinates: 56°01′N 40°11′E
- Country: Russia
- Region: Vladimir Oblast
- District: Sobinsky District
- Time zone: UTC+3:00

Kadyevo (Russian: Кадыево) is a rural locality (a village) in Aserkhovskoye Rural Settlement, Sobinsky District, Vladimir Oblast, Russia. The population was 9 as of 2010.

== Geography ==
Kadyevo is located 9 km east of Sobinka (the district's administrative centre) by road. Val is the nearest rural locality.

== History ==
In the late 19th to early 20th century, the village was part of the Vorshinskaya volost of the Vladimir district, since 1926 this is part of the Sobinskaya volost. In 1859 there were 34 households, in 1905 - 48 households, in 1926 - 48 households, an agricultural cooperative and an elementary school. Since 1929, the village has been the center of the Kadyevsky Selsoviet of the Sobinsky district, since 1965 it has been part of the Vyshmanovsky Selsoviet, since 2005 it has been part of the Aserkhovsky rural settlement.
