= Lapino, Sobinsky District, Vladimir Oblast =

Village in Russia

Lapino Лапино
- Village
- Location within Vladimir Oblast Location within Russia
- Coordinates: 55°59′N 39°56′E
- Country: Russia
- Region: Vladimir Oblast
- District: Sobinsky District
- Time zone: UTC+3:00

Lapino (Russian: Лапино) is a rural locality (a village) in Kopninskoye Rural Settlement, Sobinsky District, Vladimir Oblast, Russia. The population was 3 as of 2010.

== Geography ==
Lapino is located 17 km west of Sobinka (the district's administrative centre) by road. Petrushino is the nearest rural locality.
