= Shuvalikha =

Shuvalikha Шувалиха
- Village
- Location within Vladimir Oblast Location within Russia
- Coordinates: 55°47′N 40°03′E
- Country: Russia
- Region: Vladimir Oblast
- District: Sobinsky District
- Time zone: UTC+3:00

Shuvalikha (Russian: Шувалиха) is a rural locality (a village) in Bereznikovskoye Rural Settlement, Sobinsky District, Vladimir Oblast, Russia. The population was 15 as of 2010.

== Geography ==
Shuvalikha is located 30 km south of Sobinka (the district's administrative centre) by road. Pushnino is the nearest rural locality.
