= Fetinino =

Fetinino Фетинино
- Selo
- Location within Vladimir Oblast Location within Russia
- Coordinates: 56°16′N 39°51′E
- Country: Russia
- Region: Vladimir Oblast
- District: Sobinsky District
- Time zone: UTC+3:00

Fetinino (Russian: Фетинино) is a rural locality (a selo) in Rozhdestvenskoye Rural Settlement, Sobinsky District, Vladimir Oblast, Russia. The population was 462 as of 2010. There are 6 streets.

== Geography ==
Fetinino is located 42 km north of Sobinka (the district's administrative centre) by road. Stopino is the nearest rural locality.
