= Kishleyevo =

Kishleyevo Кишлеево
- Selo
- Location within Vladimir Oblast Location within Russia
- Coordinates: 56°14′N 40°01′E
- Country: Russia
- Region: Vladimir Oblast
- District: Sobinsky District
- Time zone: UTC+3:00

Kishleyevo (Russian: Кишлеево) is a rural locality (a selo) in Tolpukhovskoye Rural Settlement, Sobinsky District, Vladimir Oblast, Russia. The population was 396 as of 2010. There are 9 streets.

== Geography ==
Kishleyevo is located 33 km north of Sobinka (the district's administrative centre) by road. Danilovka is the nearest rural locality.
