= Ratmirovo =

Ratmirovo Ратмирово
- Selo
- Location within Vladimir Oblast Location within Russia
- Coordinates: 56°12′N 39°53′E
- Country: Russia
- Region: Vladimir Oblast
- District: Sobinsky District
- Time zone: UTC+3:00

Ratmirovo (Russian: Ратмирово) is a rural locality (a selo) in Rozhdestvenskoye Rural Settlement, Sobinsky District, Vladimir Oblast, Russia. The population was 23 as of 2010.

== Geography ==
Ratmirovo is located 32 km north of Sobinka (the district's administrative centre) by road. Rozhdestveno is the nearest rural locality.
