= Shunovo =

Shunovo Шуново
- Village
- Location within Vladimir Oblast Location within Russia
- Coordinates: 56°11′N 39°50′E
- Country: Russia
- Region: Vladimir Oblast
- District: Sobinsky District
- Time zone: UTC+3:00

Shunovo (Russian: Шуново) is a rural locality (a village) in Rozhdestvenskoye Rural Settlement, Sobinsky District, Vladimir Oblast, Russia. The population was 31 as of 2010. There are 4 streets.

== Geography ==
Shunovo is located 32 km northwest of Sobinka (the district's administrative centre) by road. Borisovo is the nearest rural locality.
