= Aserkhovo =

Aserkhovo Асерхово
- Settlement
- Location within Vladimir Oblast Location within Russia
- Coordinates: 55°56′N 40°14′E
- Country: Russia
- Region: Vladimir Oblast
- District: Sobinsky District
- Time zone: UTC+3:00

Aserkhovo (Russian: Асерхово) is a rural locality (a settlement) and the administrative center of Aserkhovskoye Rural Settlement, Sobinsky District, Vladimir Oblast, Russia. The population was 788 as of 2010. There are 16 streets.

== Geography ==
Aserkhovo is located 20 km southeast of Sobinka (the district's administrative centre) by road. Voshilovo is the nearest rural locality.
