= Levino, Sobinsky District, Vladimir Oblast =

Levino Левино
- Village
- Location within Vladimir Oblast Location within Russia
- Coordinates: 55°54′N 40°01′E
- Country: Russia
- Region: Vladimir Oblast
- District: Sobinsky District
- Time zone: UTC+3:00

Levino (Russian: Левино) is a rural locality (a village) in Bereznikovskoye Rural Settlement, Sobinsky District, Vladimir Oblast, Russia. The population was 17 as of 2010.

== Geography ==
Levino is located 14 km south of Sobinka (the district's administrative centre) by road. Shepeli is the nearest rural locality.
