= Rybkhoz Vorsha =

Rybkhoz Vorsha Рыбхоз Ворша
- Village
- Location within Vladimir Oblast Location within Russia
- Coordinates: 56°02′N 40°04′E
- Country: Russia
- Region: Vladimir Oblast
- District: Sobinsky District
- Time zone: UTC+3:00

Rybkhoz Vorsha (Russian: Рыбхоз Ворша) is a rural locality (a village) in Kurilovskoye Rural Settlement, Sobinsky District, Vladimir Oblast, Russia. The population was 52 as of 2010.

== Geography ==
Rybkhoz Vorsha is located on the Vorsha River, 10 km northeast of Sobinka (the district's administrative centre) by road. Konino is the nearest rural locality.
