= Yurovo, Sobinsky District, Vladimir Oblast =

Yurovo Юрово
- Selo
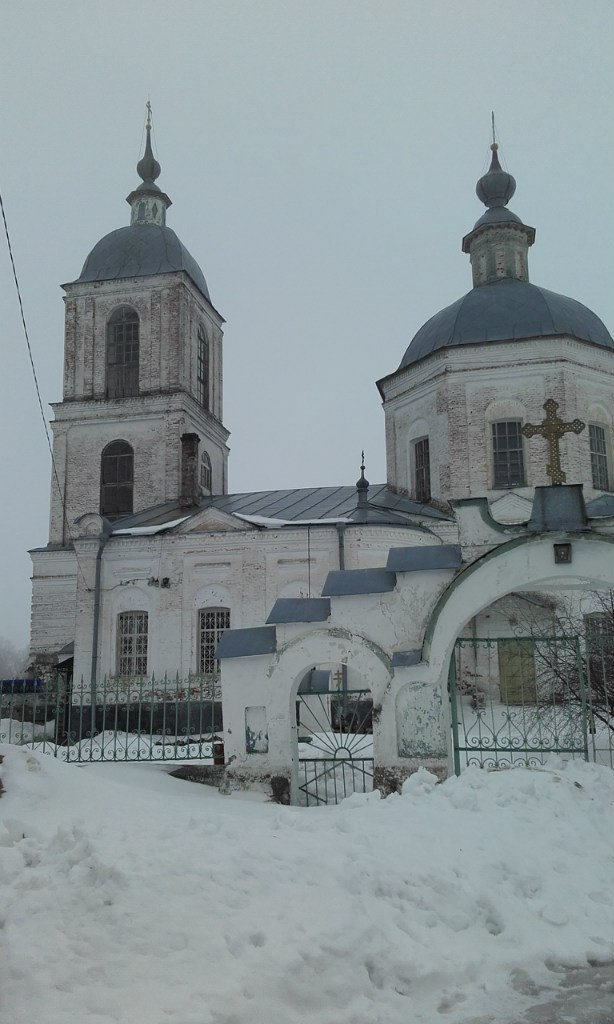
- Church of St Nicholas the Wonderworker

- Location within Vladimir Oblast Location within Russia
- Coordinates: 56°06′N 39°55′E
- Country: Russia
- Region: Vladimir Oblast
- District: Sobinsky District
- Time zone: UTC+3:00

Yurovo (Russian: Юрово) is a rural locality (a selo) in Kurilovskoye Rural Settlement, Sobinsky District, Vladimir Oblast, Russia. The population was 21 as of 2010.

== Geography ==
Yurovo is located on the Vezhbolovka River, 18 km (11 mi) north of Sobinka (the district's administrative centre) by road. Kopytovo is the nearest rural locality.
