= Vishnyakovo, Sobinsky District, Vladimir Oblast =

Vishnyakovo Вишняково
- Village
- Location within Vladimir Oblast Location within Russia
- Coordinates: 56°04′N 39°54′E
- Country: Russia
- Region: Vladimir Oblast
- District: Sobinsky District
- Time zone: UTC+3:00

Vishnyakovo (Russian: Вишняково) is a rural locality (a village) in Kurilovskoye Rural Settlement, Sobinsky District, Vladimir Oblast, Russia. The population was 5 as of 2010. There are 2 streets.

== Geography ==
Vishnyakovo is located on the Vorsha River, 14 km north of Sobinka (the district's administrative centre) by road. Koroyedovo is the nearest rural locality.
