= Golubino, Vladimir Oblast =

Golubino Голубино
- Village
- Location within Vladimir Oblast Location within Russia
- Coordinates: 55°48′N 40°04′E
- Country: Russia
- Region: Vladimir Oblast
- District: Sobinsky District
- Time zone: UTC+3:00

Golubino (Russian: Голубино) is a rural locality (a village) in Bereznikovskoye Rural Settlement, Sobinsky District, Vladimir Oblast, Russia. The population was 6 as of 2010.

== Geography ==
Golubino is located 28 km south of Sobinka (the district's administrative centre) by road. Shuvalikha is the nearest rural locality.
