= Undolsky =

Undolsky Ундольский
- Settlement
- Location within Vladimir Oblast Location within Russia
- Coordinates: 56°01′N 39°56′E
- Country: Russia
- Region: Vladimir Oblast
- District: Sobinsky District
- Time zone: UTC+3:00

Undolsky (Russian: Ундольский) is a rural locality (a settlement) in Kopninskoye Rural Settlement, Sobinsky District, Vladimir Oblast, Russia. The population was 409 as of 2010. There are 4 streets.

== Geography ==
Undolsky is located 9 km northwest of Sobinka (the district's administrative centre) by road. Lakinsk is the nearest rural locality.
