= Oderikhino =

Oderikhino Одерихино
- Village
- Location within Vladimir Oblast Location within Russia
- Coordinates: 56°05′N 40°09′E
- Country: Russia
- Region: Vladimir Oblast
- District: Sobinsky District
- Time zone: UTC+3:00

Oderikhino (Russian: Одерихино) is a rural locality (a village) in Kolokshanskoye Rural Settlement, Sobinsky District, Vladimir Oblast, Russia. The population was 85 as of 2010. There are 3 streets.

== Geography ==
Oderikhino is located 21 km northeast of Sobinka (the district's administrative centre) by road. Energetik is the nearest rural locality.
