= Nikulino (Aserkhovskoye Rural Settlement), Sobinsky District, Vladimir Oblast =

Nikulino Никулино
- Village
- Location within Vladimir Oblast Location within Russia
- Coordinates: 56°00′N 40°09′E
- Country: Russia
- Region: Vladimir Oblast
- District: Sobinsky District
- Time zone: UTC+3:00

Nikulino (Russian: Никулино) is a rural locality (a village) in Aserkhovskoye Rural Settlement, Sobinsky District, Vladimir Oblast, Russia. The population was 4 as of 2010.

== Geography ==
The village is located 10 km north-west from Aserkhovo, 10 km east from Sobinka.
