= Remni =

Remni Ремни
- Village
- Location within Vladimir Oblast Location within Russia
- Coordinates: 55°59′N 40°15′E
- Country: Russia
- Region: Vladimir Oblast
- District: Sobinsky District
- Time zone: UTC+3:00

Remni (Russian: Ремни) is a rural locality (a village) in Aserkhovskoye Rural Settlement, Sobinsky District, Vladimir Oblast, Russia. The population was 5 as of 2010. There are 2 streets.

== Geography ==
Remni is located 18 km east of Sobinka (the district's administrative centre) by road. Meshchera is the nearest rural locality.
