= Novosyolovo, Sobinsky District, Vladimir Oblast =

Novosyolovo Новосёлово
- Village
- Location within Vladimir Oblast Location within Russia
- Coordinates: 55°55′N 39°55′E
- Country: Russia
- Region: Vladimir Oblast
- District: Sobinsky District
- Time zone: UTC+3:00

Novosyolovo (Russian: Новосёлово) is a rural locality (a village) in Kopninskoye Rural Settlement, Sobinsky District, Vladimir Oblast, Russia. The population was 26 as of 2010.

== Geography ==
Novosyolovo is located on the Silunikha River, 24 km southwest of Sobinka (the district's administrative centre) by road. Zarechnoye is the nearest rural locality.
