= Bratonezh =

Bratonezh Братонеж
- Village
- Location within Vladimir Oblast Location within Russia
- Coordinates: 55°56′N 39°50′E
- Country: Russia
- Region: Vladimir Oblast
- District: Sobinsky District
- Time zone: UTC+3:00

Bratonezh (Russian: Братонеж) is a rural locality (a village) in Kopninskoye Rural Settlement, Sobinsky District, Vladimir Oblast, Russia. The population was 2 as of 2010.

== Geography ==
Bratonezh is located 8 km west from Zarechnoye, 27 km southwest of Sobinka (the district's administrative centre) by road. Fedotovo is the nearest rural locality.
