= Luchinskoye =

Luchinskoye Лучинское
- Village
- Location within Vladimir Oblast Location within Russia
- Coordinates: 56°11′N 40°01′E
- Country: Russia
- Region: Vladimir Oblast
- District: Sobinsky District
- Time zone: UTC+3:00

Luchinskoye (Russian: Лучинское) is a rural locality (a village) in Tolpukhovskoye Rural Settlement, Sobinsky District, Vladimir Oblast, Russia. The population was 143 as of 2010. There are 4 streets.

== Geography ==
Luchinskoye is located 26 km north of Sobinka (the district's administrative centre) by road. Bezvodnoye is the nearest rural locality.
