= Zhokhovo =

Zhokhovo Жохово
- Village
- Location within Vladimir Oblast Location within Russia
- Coordinates: 55°52′N 39°50′E
- Country: Russia
- Region: Vladimir Oblast
- District: Sobinsky District
- Time zone: UTC+3:00

Zhokhovo (Russian: Жохово) is a rural locality (a village) in Kopninskoye Rural Settlement, Sobinsky District, Vladimir Oblast, Russia. The population was 107 as of 2010.

== Geography ==
Zhokhovo is located on the left bank of the Klyazma River, 26 km southwest of Sobinka (the district's administrative centre) by road. Pogost is the nearest rural locality.
