= Khrenovo =

Khrenovo Хреново
- Village
- Location within Vladimir Oblast Location within Russia
- Coordinates: 56°00′N 39°57′E
- Country: Russia
- Region: Vladimir Oblast
- District: Sobinsky District
- Time zone: UTC+3:00

Khrenovo (Russian: Хреново) is a rural locality (a village) in Kopninskoye Rural Settlement, Sobinsky District, Vladimir Oblast, Russia. The population was 105 as of 2010.

== Geography ==
The village is located on the Undolka River, 8 km north-west from Sobinka.
