= Antsiferovo, Vladimir Oblast =

Antsiferovo Анциферово
- Village
- Location within Vladimir Oblast Location within Russia
- Coordinates: 56°08′N 39°50′E
- Country: Russia
- Region: Vladimir Oblast
- District: Sobinsky District
- Time zone: UTC+3:00

Antsiferovo (Russian: Анциферово) is a rural locality (a village) in Kurilovskoye Rural Settlement, Sobinsky District, Vladimir Oblast, Russia. The population was 6 as of 2010.

== Geography ==
Antsiferovo is located 35 km northwest of Sobinka (the district's administrative centre) by road. Glukhovo is the nearest rural locality.
