= Podvyazye, Sobinsky District, Vladimir Oblast =

Podvyazye Подвязье
- Village
- Location within Vladimir Oblast Location within Russia
- Coordinates: 56°15′N 40°03′E
- Country: Russia
- Region: Vladimir Oblast
- District: Sobinsky District
- Time zone: UTC+3:00

Podvyazye (Russian: Подвязье) is a rural locality (a village) in Tolpukhovskoye Rural Settlement, Sobinsky District, Vladimir Oblast, Russia. The population was 5 as of 2010.

== Geography ==
Podvyazye is located 37 km north of Sobinka (the district's administrative centre) by road. Bukholovo is the nearest rural locality.
