= Piskutino =

Piskutino Пискутино
- Village
- Location within Vladimir Oblast Location within Russia
- Coordinates: 56°15′N 39°49′E
- Country: Russia
- Region: Vladimir Oblast
- District: Sobinsky District
- Time zone: UTC+3:00

Piskutino (Russian: Пискутино) is a rural locality (a village) in Rozhdestvenskoye Rural Settlement, Sobinsky District, Vladimir Oblast, Russia. The population was 4 as of 2010.

== Geography ==
Piskutino is located on the Yeza River, 45 km north of Sobinka (the district's administrative centre) by road. Stopino is the nearest rural locality.
