= Mitrofanikha =

Mitrofanikha Митрофаниха
- Village
- Location within Vladimir Oblast Location within Russia
- Coordinates: 55°56′N 39°54′E
- Country: Russia
- Region: Vladimir Oblast
- District: Sobinsky District
- Time zone: UTC+3:00

Mitrofanikha (Russian: Митрофаниха) is a rural locality (a village) in Kopninskoye Rural Settlement, Sobinsky District, Vladimir Oblast, Russia. The population was 46 as of 2010. There are 3 streets.

== Geography ==
Mitrofanikha is located on the Silunikha River, 22 km southwest of Sobinka (the district's administrative centre) by road. Zarechnoye is the nearest rural locality.
