= Spirino =

Spirino Спирино
- Village
- Location within Vladimir Oblast Location within Russia
- Coordinates: 56°04′N 39°51′E
- Country: Russia
- Region: Vladimir Oblast
- District: Sobinsky District
- Time zone: UTC+3:00

Spirino (Russian: Спирино) is a rural locality (a village) in Kurilovskoye Rural Settlement, Sobinsky District, Vladimir Oblast, Russia. Population:3 (2021 census); 3 (2010 census); 5 (2002 census);

== Geography ==
Spirino is located on the Vorsha River, 18 km northwest of Sobinka (the district's administrative centre) by road. Stepankovo is the nearest rural locality.
