= Bulanovo =

Bulanovo Буланово
- Selo
- Location within Vladimir Oblast Location within Russia
- Coordinates: 56°00′N 40°15′E
- Country: Russia
- Region: Vladimir Oblast
- District: Sobinsky District
- Time zone: UTC+3:00

Bulanovo (Russian: Буланово) is a rural locality (a selo) in Aserkhovskoye Rural Settlement, Sobinsky District, Vladimir Oblast, Russia. The population was 14 as of 2010.

== Geography ==
Bulanovo is located 20 km (12 mi) east of Sobinka (the district's administrative centre) by road. Meshchera is the nearest rural locality.
