= Stepanikha =

Stepanikha Степаниха
- Village
- Location within Vladimir Oblast Location within Russia
- Coordinates: 56°14′N 39°55′E
- Country: Russia
- Region: Vladimir Oblast
- District: Sobinsky District
- Time zone: UTC+3:00

Stepanikha (Russian: Степаниха) is a rural locality (a village) in Rozhdestvenskoye Rural Settlement, Sobinsky District, Vladimir Oblast, Russia. The population was 1 as of 2010.

== Geography ==
Stepanikha is located 38 km north of Sobinka (the district's administrative centre) by road. Chaganovo is the nearest rural locality.
