= Rozhdestveno, Sobinsky District, Vladimir Oblast =

Rozhdestveno Рождествено
- Village
- Location within Vladimir Oblast Location within Russia
- Coordinates: 56°11′N 39°53′E
- Country: Russia
- Region: Vladimir Oblast
- District: Sobinsky District
- Time zone: UTC+3:00

Rozhdestveno (Russian: Рождествено) is a rural locality (a village) and the administrative center of Rozhdestvenskoye Rural Settlement, Sobinsky District, Vladimir Oblast, Russia. The population was 700 as of 2010. There are 13 streets.

== Geography ==
Rozhdestveno is located 30 km north of Sobinka (the district's administrative centre) by road. Ratmirovo is the nearest rural locality.
