= Rukav =

Rukav Рукав
- Village
- Location within Vladimir Oblast Location within Russia
- Coordinates: 56°05′N 40°12′E
- Country: Russia
- Region: Vladimir Oblast
- District: Sobinsky District
- Time zone: UTC+3:00

Rukav (Russian: Рукав) is a rural locality (a village) in Kolokshanskoye Rural Settlement, Sobinsky District, Vladimir Oblast, Russia. The population was 129 as of 2010.

== Geography ==
Rukav is located 22 km northeast of Sobinka (the district's administrative centre) by road. Yuryevets is the nearest rural locality.
