= Kopytovo =

Kopytovo Копытово
- Village
- Location within Vladimir Oblast Location within Russia
- Coordinates: 56°06′N 39°55′E
- Country: Russia
- Region: Vladimir Oblast
- District: Sobinsky District
- Time zone: UTC+3:00

Kopytovo (Russian: Копытово) is a rural locality (a village) in Kurilovskoye Rural Settlement, Sobinsky District, Vladimir Oblast, Russia. The population was 7 as of 2010.

== Geography ==
Kopytovo is located 19 km north of Sobinka (the district's administrative centre) by road. Yurovo is the nearest rural locality.
