= Orekhovo, Vladimir Oblast =

Orekhovo Орехово
- Village
- Location within Vladimir Oblast Location within Russia
- Coordinates: 56°09′N 39°52′E
- Country: Russia
- Region: Vladimir Oblast
- District: Sobinsky District
- Time zone: UTC+3:00

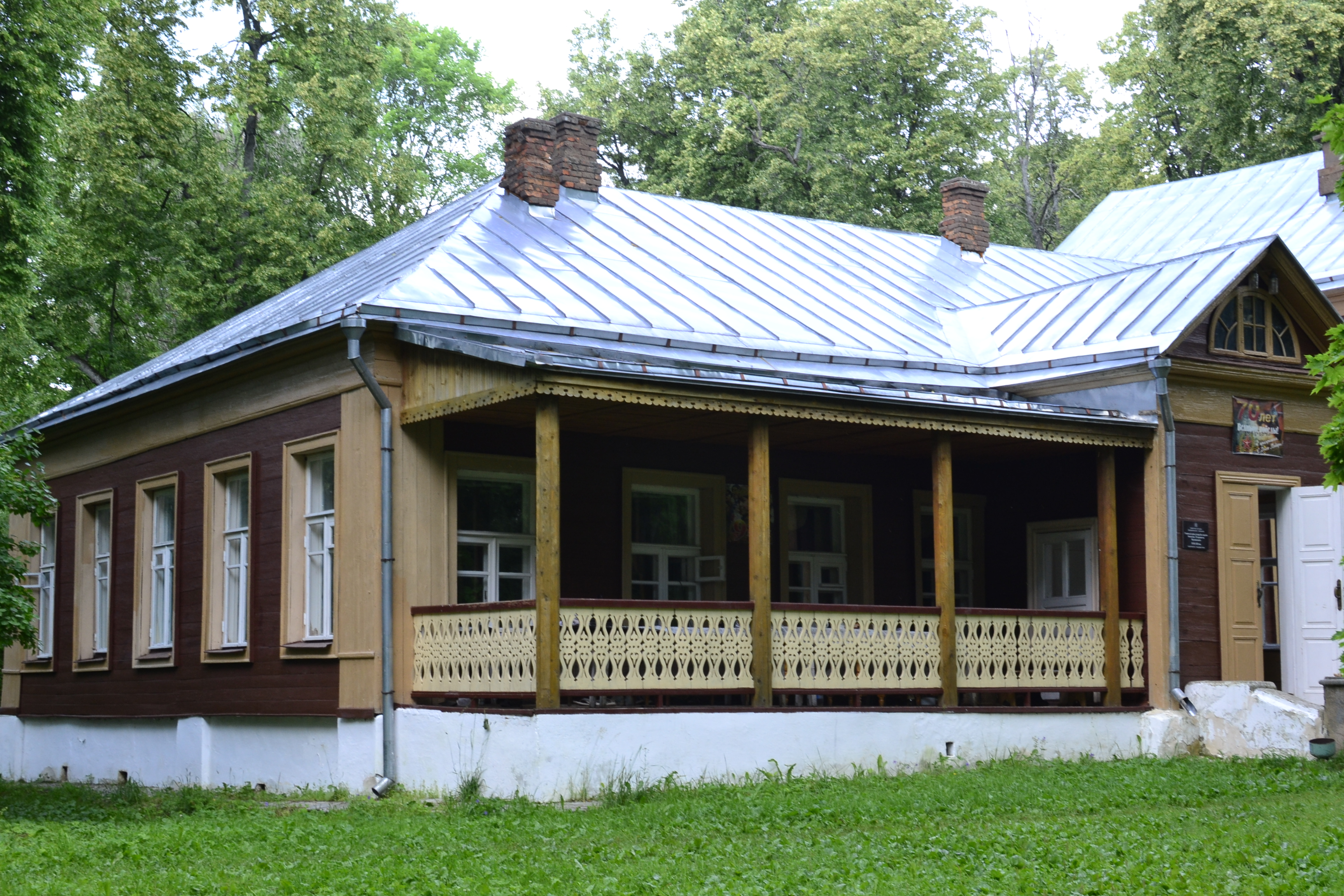
A home in Orekhovo

Orekhovo (Russian: Орехово) is a rural locality (a village) in Tolpukhovskoye Rural Settlement, Sobinsky District, Vladimir Oblast, Russia. The population was 16 as of 2010. There are 4 streets.

== Geography ==
Orekhovo is located on the Vezhbolovka River, 28 km north of Sobinka (the district's administrative centre) by road. Novino is the nearest rural locality.
