= Mikhlino =

Mikhlino Михлино
- Village
- Location within Vladimir Oblast Location within Russia
- Coordinates: 56°11′N 40°09′E
- Country: Russia
- Region: Vladimir Oblast
- District: Sobinsky District
- Time zone: UTC+3:00

Mikhlino (Russian: Михлино) is a rural locality (a village) in Tolpukhovskoye Rural Settlement, Sobinsky District, Vladimir Oblast, Russia. The population was 4 as of 2010.

== Geography ==
Mikhlino is located 32 km northeast of Sobinka (the district's administrative centre) by road. Volosovo is the nearest rural locality.
