= Vasilyovo, Sobinsky District, Vladimir Oblast =

Vasilyovo Василёво
- Village
- Location within Vladimir Oblast Location within Russia
- Coordinates: 56°13′N 39°51′E
- Country: Russia
- Region: Vladimir Oblast
- District: Sobinsky District
- Time zone: UTC+3:00

Vasilyovo (Russian: Василёво) is a rural locality (a village) in Rozhdestvenskoye Rural Settlement, Sobinsky District, Vladimir Oblast, Russia. The population was 8 as of 2010.

== Geography ==
Vasilyovo is located 39 km north of Sobinka (the district's administrative centre) by road. Kornevo is the nearest rural locality.
