= Koverlevo =

Koverlevo Коверлево
- Village
- Location within Vladimir Oblast Location within Russia
- Coordinates: 56°13′N 40°03′E
- Country: Russia
- Region: Vladimir Oblast
- District: Sobinsky District
- Time zone: UTC+3:00

Koverlevo (Russian: Коверлево) is a rural locality (a village) in Tolpukhovskoye Rural Settlement, Sobinsky District, Vladimir Oblast, Russia. The population was 11 as of 2010.

== Geography ==
Koverlevo is located 31 km north of Sobinka (the district's administrative centre) by road. Danilovka is the nearest rural locality.
