= Strukovo =

Strukovo Струково
- Village
- Location within Vladimir Oblast Location within Russia
- Coordinates: 56°08′N 40°08′E
- Country: Russia
- Region: Vladimir Oblast
- District: Sobinsky District
- Time zone: UTC+3:00

Strukovo (Russian: Струково) is a rural locality (a village) in Kolokshanskoye Rural Settlement, Sobinsky District, Vladimir Oblast, Russia. The population was 12 as of 2010.

== Geography ==
Strukovo is located 29 km northeast of Sobinka (the district's administrative centre) by road. Roganovo is the nearest rural locality.
