= Malakhovo, Sobinsky District, Vladimir Oblast =

Malakhovo Малахово
- Village
- Location within Vladimir Oblast Location within Russia
- Coordinates: 55°49′N 40°13′E
- Country: Russia
- Region: Vladimir Oblast
- District: Sobinsky District
- Time zone: UTC+3:00

Malakhovo (Russian: Малахово) is a rural locality (a village) in Bereznikovskoye Rural Settlement, Sobinsky District, Vladimir Oblast, Russia. The population was 9 as of 2010.

== Geography ==
Malakhovo is located 34 km southeast of Sobinka (the district's administrative centre) by road. Zhabino is the nearest rural locality.
