= Meshchyora, Sobinsky District, Vladimir Oblast =

Meshchyora Мещёра
- Village
- Location within Vladimir Oblast Location within Russia
- Coordinates: 55°59′N 40°15′E
- Country: Russia
- Region: Vladimir Oblast
- District: Sobinsky District
- Time zone: UTC+3:00

Meshchyora (Russian: Мещёра) is a rural locality (a village) in Aserkhovskoye Rural Settlement, Sobinsky District, Vladimir Oblast, Russia. The population was 1 as of 2010.

== Geography ==
Meshchyora is located 20 km east of Sobinka (the district's administrative centre) by road. Bulanovo is the nearest rural locality.
