= Sheldyakovo =

Sheldyakovo Шелдяково
- Village
- Location within Vladimir Oblast Location within Russia
- Coordinates: 56°09′N 39°59′E
- Country: Russia
- Region: Vladimir Oblast
- District: Sobinsky District
- Time zone: UTC+3:00

Sheldyakovo (Russian: Шелдяково) is a rural locality (a village) in Tolpukhovskoye Rural Settlement, Sobinsky District, Vladimir Oblast, Russia. The population was 16 as of 2010.

== Geography ==
Sheldyakovo is located 23 km north of Sobinka (the district's administrative centre) by road. Dobrynino is the nearest rural locality.
