= Pogost, Sobinsky District, Vladimir Oblast =

Pogost Погост
- Village
- Location within Vladimir Oblast Location within Russia
- Coordinates: 55°52′N 39°51′E
- Country: Russia
- Region: Vladimir Oblast
- District: Sobinsky District
- Time zone: UTC+3:00

Pogost (Russian: Погост) is a rural locality (a village) in Kopninskoye Rural Settlement, Sobinsky District, Vladimir Oblast, Russia. The population was 29 as of 2010.

== Geography ==
Pogost is located 25 km southwest of Sobinka (the district's administrative centre) by road. Zhokhovo is the nearest rural locality.
