= Kolokolnitsa =

Kolokolnitsa Колокольница
- Village
- Location within Vladimir Oblast Location within Russia
- Coordinates: 56°00′N 40°10′E
- Country: Russia
- Region: Vladimir Oblast
- District: Sobinsky District
- Time zone: UTC+3:00

Kolokolnitsa (Russian: Колокольница) is a rural locality (a village) in Aserkhovskoye Rural Settlement, Sobinsky District, Vladimir Oblast, Russia. The population was 17 as of 2010.

== Geography ==
Kolokolnitsa is located 11 km east of Sobinka (the district's administrative centre) by road. Pushnino is the nearest rural locality.
