= Vorsha, Vladimir Oblast =

Vorsha Ворша
- Selo
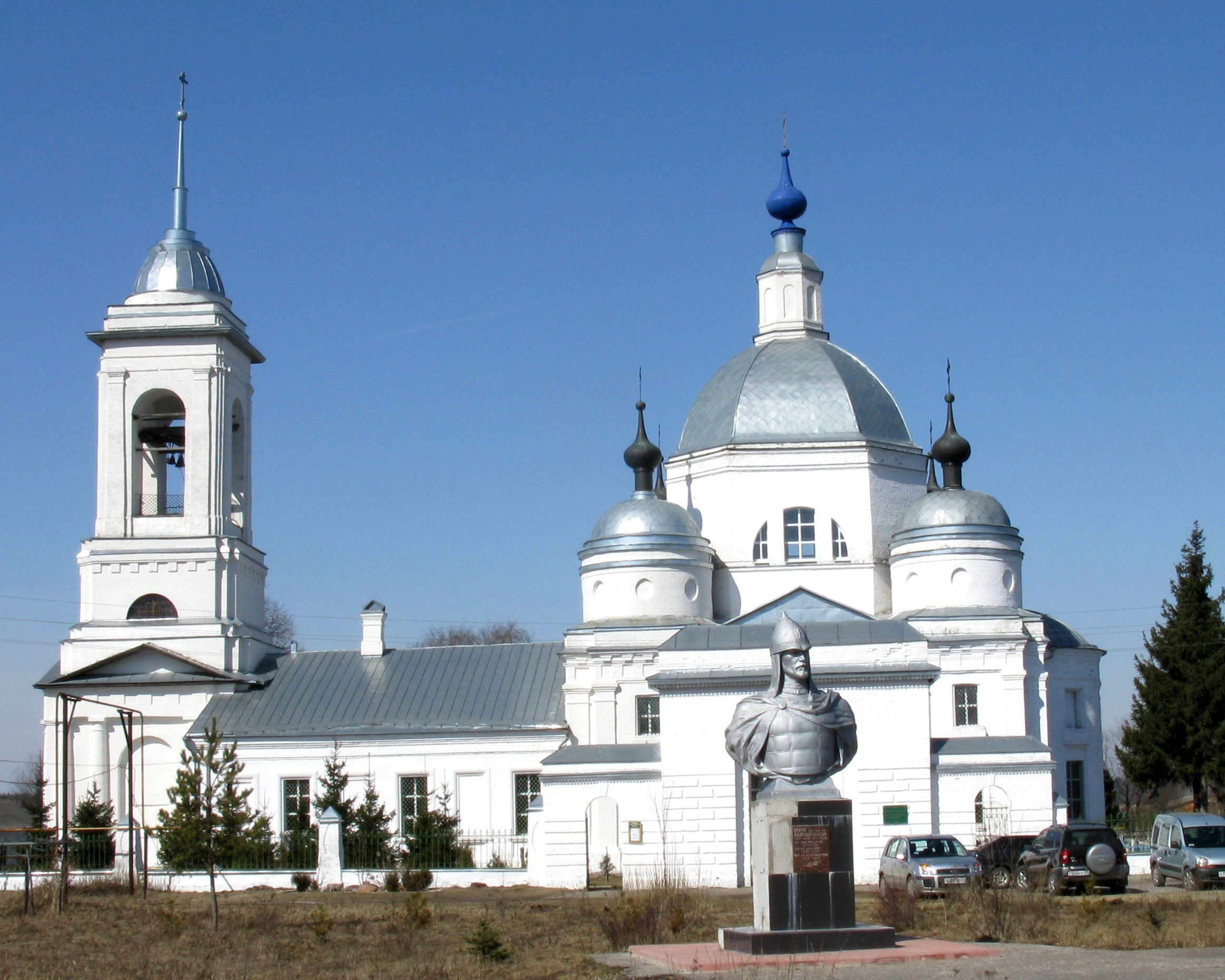

- Location within Vladimir Oblast Location within Russia
- Coordinates: 56°02′N 40°04′E
- Country: Russia
- Region: Vladimir Oblast
- District: Sobinsky District
- Time zone: UTC+3:00

Vorsha (Russian: Ворша) is a rural locality (a selo) and the administrative center of Vorshinskoye Rural Settlement, Sobinsky District, Vladimir Oblast, Russia. The population was 1,437 as of 2010. There are 8 streets.

== Geography ==
Vorsha is located on the right bank of the Vorsha River, 10 km northeast of Sobinka (the district's administrative centre) by road. Konino is the nearest rural locality.
