= Ugryumikha =

Ugryumikha Угрюмиха
- Village
- Location within Vladimir Oblast Location within Russia
- Coordinates: 55°54′N 40°02′E
- Country: Russia
- Region: Vladimir Oblast
- District: Sobinsky District
- Time zone: UTC+3:00

Ugryumikha (Russian: Угрюмиха) is a rural locality (a village) in Bereznikovskoye Rural Settlement, Sobinsky District, Vladimir Oblast, Russia. The population was 18 as of 2010.

== Geography ==
Ugryumikha is located 15 km south of Sobinka (the district's administrative centre) by road. Dubrovo is the nearest rural locality.
