= Bolshoye Ivankovo =

Bolshoye Ivankovo Большое Иваньково
- Village
- Location within Vladimir Oblast Location within Russia
- Coordinates: 56°03′N 40°12′E
- Country: Russia
- Region: Vladimir Oblast
- District: Sobinsky District
- Time zone: UTC+3:00

Bolshoye Ivankovo (Russian: Большое Иваньково) is a rural locality (a village) in Kolokshanskoye Rural Settlement, Sobinsky District, Vladimir Oblast, Russia. The population was 68 as of 2010. There are 2 streets.

== Geography ==
Bolshoye Ivankovo is located 27 km northeast of Sobinka (the district's administrative centre) by road. Ustye is the nearest rural locality.
