= Chizhovo =

Chizhovo Чижово
- Village
- Location within Vladimir Oblast Location within Russia
- Coordinates: 56°07′N 40°06′E
- Country: Russia
- Region: Vladimir Oblast
- District: Sobinsky District
- Time zone: UTC+3:00

Chizhovo (Russian: Чижово) is a rural locality (a village) in Vorshinskoye Rural Settlement, Sobinsky District, Vladimir Oblast, in the Russian Federation. During the 2010 census, the population was 9.

There are 20 streets in the village.

Grigory Potemkin was born in the village in around 1739.

== Geography ==
Chizhovo is located 29 km northeast of Sobinka (the district's administrative centre) by road. Buzakovo is the nearest rural locality.
