= Yelkhovitsa =

Yelkhovitsa Елховица
- Village
- Location within Vladimir Oblast Location within Russia
- Coordinates: 56°01′N 40°04′E
- Country: Russia
- Region: Vladimir Oblast
- District: Sobinsky District
- Time zone: UTC+3:00

Yelkhovitsa (Russian: Елховица) is a rural locality (a village) in Vorshinskoye Rural Settlement, Sobinsky District, Vladimir Oblast, Russia. The population was 23 as of 2010.

== Geography ==
Yelkhovitsa is located 13 km northeast of Sobinka (the district's administrative centre) by road. Kuzmino is the nearest rural locality.
