= Vyshmanovo =

Village in russia

Vyshmanovo Вышманово
- Village
- Location within Vladimir Oblast Location within Russia
- Coordinates: 55°59′N 40°12′E
- Country: Russia
- Region: Vladimir Oblast
- District: Sobinsky District
- Time zone: UTC+3:00

Vyshmanovo (Russian: Вышманово) is a rural locality (a village) in Aserkhovskoye Rural Settlement, Sobinsky District, Vladimir Oblast, Russia. The population was 372 as of 2010. There are 10 streets.

== Geography ==
Vyshmanovo is located 14 km east of Sobinka (the district's administrative centre) by road. Zaprudye is the nearest rural locality.
