= Bokovino =

Bokovino Боковино
- Village
- Location within Vladimir Oblast Location within Russia
- Coordinates: 56°01′N 40°12′E
- Country: Russia
- Region: Vladimir Oblast
- District: Sobinsky District
- Time zone: UTC+3:00

Bokovino (Russian: Боковино) is a rural locality (a village) in Aserkhovskoye Rural Settlement, Sobinsky District, Vladimir Oblast, Russia. The population was 4 as of 2010.

== Geography ==
Bokovino is located 14 km east of Sobinka (the district's administrative centre) by road. Mosyagino is the nearest rural locality.
