= Chaganovo =

Chaganovo Чаганово
- Village
- Location within Vladimir Oblast Location within Russia
- Coordinates: 56°13′N 39°56′E
- Country: Russia
- Region: Vladimir Oblast
- District: Sobinsky District
- Time zone: UTC+3:00

Chaganovo (Russian: Чаганово) is a rural locality (a village) in Rozhdestvenskoye Rural Settlement, Sobinsky District, Vladimir Oblast, Russia. The population was 10 as of 2010. There are 3 streets.

== Geography ==
Chaganovo is located on the Koloksha River, 37 km north of Sobinka (the district's administrative centre) by road. Meshchera is the nearest rural locality.
