= Krutoyak =

Krutoyak Крутояк
- Village
- Location within Vladimir Oblast Location within Russia
- Coordinates: 55°56′N 39°59′E
- Country: Russia
- Region: Vladimir Oblast
- District: Sobinsky District
- Time zone: UTC+3:00

Krutoyak (Russian: Крутояк) is a rural locality (a village) in Bereznikovskoye Rural Settlement, Sobinsky District, Vladimir Oblast, Russia. The population was 77 as of 2010.

== Geography ==
Krutoyak is located on the Klyazma River, 8 km southwest of Sobinka (the district's administrative centre) by road. Perebor is the nearest rural locality.
