= Zaprudye =

Zaprudye (Russian: Запрудье) is the name of several localities in Russia.

- Zaprudye, Vladimir Oblast
- ru:Запрудье (Смоленская область)
- ru:Запрудье (Бежецкий район)
- ru:Запрудье (Калязинский район)
- ru:Запрудье (Сандовский район)
- ru:Запрудье (Сонковский район)

== See also ==
- Zapruddia, Ukrainian equivalent
- Zapruddzye, Belarus equivalent
- Užuprūdžiai, Lithuanian equivalent
