= Sobinsky =

Sobinsky (masculine), Sobinskaya (feminine), or Sobinskoye (neuter) may refer to:

- Sobinsky District, a district of Vladimir Oblast, Russia
- Sobinsky (rural locality), a rural locality (a pochinok) in the Udmurt Republic, Russia
