= Churilovo, Sobinsky District, Vladimir Oblast =

Churilovo Чурилово
- Village
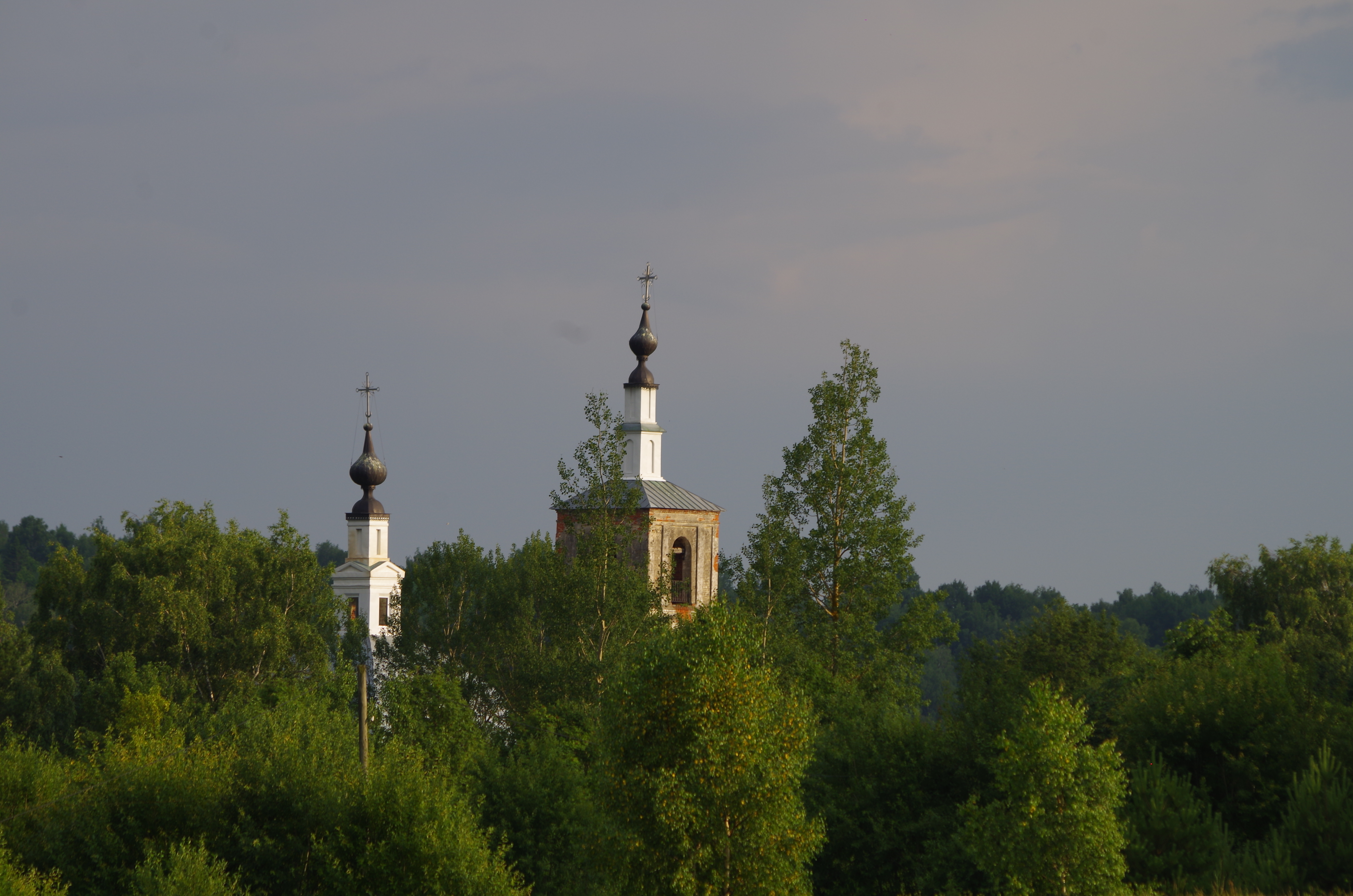

- Location within Vladimir Oblast Location within Russia
- Coordinates: 56°09′N 40°08′E
- Country: Russia
- Region: Vladimir Oblast
- District: Sobinsky District
- Time zone: UTC+3:00

Churilovo (Russian: Чурилово) is a rural locality (a village) in Tolpukhovskoye Rural Settlement, Sobinsky District, Vladimir Oblast, Russia. The population was 8 as of 2010.

== Geography ==
Churilovo is located on the Kolochka River, 28 km northeast of Sobinka (the district's administrative centre) by road. Krutoy Ovrag is the nearest rural locality.
