= Zapruddia =

Zapruddia or Zapruddya may refer to the following localities in Ukraine:

- Zapruddia, Bila Tserkva Raion, Kyiv Oblast
- Zapruddia, Kamin-Kashyrskyi Raion, Volyn Oblast

== See also ==
- Zapruddzye, Belarusian equivalent
- Zaprudye, Russian equivalent
- Užuprūdžiai, Lithuanian equivalent
