= Užuprūdžiai =

Užuprūdžiai is the name of several localities in Lithuania.

- Užuprūdžiai (Panevėžys)
- Užuprūdžiai (Vilnius)

== See also ==
- Zapruddzie, Belarusian equivalent
- Zapruddia, Ukrainian equivalent
- Zaprudye, Russian equivalent
