= Zapruddzye =

Zapruddzye or Zapruddzie (Belarusian: Запруддзе) is the name of several localities in Belarus.

== Grodno region ==
- be:Запруддзе (Зэльвенскі раён)

== Minsk region ==
- be:Запруддзе (Барысаўскі раён)
- be:Запруддзе (Валожынскі раён)
- be:Запруддзе (Крупскі раён)
- be:Запруддзе (Уздзенскі раён)

== Mogilev region ==
- be:Запруддзе (Горацкі раён)
- be:Запруддзе (Круглянскі раён)
- be:Запруддзе (Махаўскі сельсавет
- be:Запруддзе (Падгор’еўскі сельсавет

== Vitebsk region ==
- be:Запруддзе (Глыбоцкі раён)
- be:Запруддзе (Сенненскі раён)
- be:Запруддзе (Талачынскі раён)
- be:Запруддзе (Віцебскі раён)

== See also ==
- Zapruddia, Ukrainian equivalent
- Zaprudye, Russian equivalent
- Užuprūdžiai, Lithuanian equivalent
