= Churilovo, Sheksninsky District, Vologda Oblast =

Churilovo Чурилово
- Village
- Location within Vologda Oblast Location within Russia
- Coordinates: 59°12′N 38°42′E
- Country: Russia
- Region: Vologda Oblast
- District: Sheksninsky District
- Time zone: UTC+3:00

Churilovo (Russian: Чурилово) is a rural locality (a village) in Chyobsarskoye Urban Settlement, Sheksninsky District, Vologda Oblast, Russia. The population was 12 as of 2002.

== Geography ==
Churilovo is located 34 km east of Sheksna (the district's administrative centre) by road. Selino is the nearest rural locality.
