= Sobinka =

Sobinka Собинка
- Town

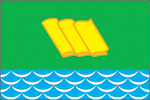
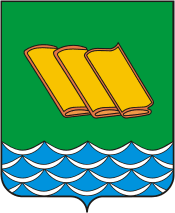
- Flag Coat of arms
- Interactive map of Sobinka
- Location of Sobinka Sobinka (Europe) Sobinka (Russia)
- Coordinates: 56°00′N 40°02′E
- Country: Russia
- Federal subject: Vladimir Oblast
- Administrative district: Sobinsky District
- Founded: 1858
- Town status since: 1939
- Elevation: 105 m (344 ft)

Population (2010 Census)
  - Total: 19,482
  - Estimate (2021): 17,444 (−10.5%)

Administrative status
  - Capital of: Sobinsky District

Municipal status
  - Municipal district: Sobinsky Municipal District
  - Urban settlement: Sobinka Urban Settlement
  - Capital of: Sobinsky Municipal District, Sobinka Urban Settlement
- Time zone: UTC+3 (MSK)
- Postal code: 601200
- OKTMO ID: 17650101001
- Website: sobinka-city.ru

Sobinka (Russian: Со́бинка) is a town and the administrative center of Sobinsky District in Vladimir Oblast, Russia, located on the right bank of the Klyazma River (Oka's tributary), 37 kilometers (23 mi) southwest of Vladimir, the administrative center of the oblast. Population: 17,444 (2021 census); 19,482 (2010 census); 21,054 (2002 census); 23,720 (1989 Soviet census).

== History ==
It was called Komavangard (Комавангард) for a short period in the 1920s. It was granted town status in 1939.

== Administrative and municipal status ==
Within the framework of administrative divisions, Sobinka serves as the administrative center of Sobinsky District, to which it is directly subordinated. As a municipal division, the town of Sobinka is incorporated within Sobinsky Municipal District as Sobinka Urban Settlement.
