= Sobinsky District =

Sobinsky District Собинский район (Russian)
- District
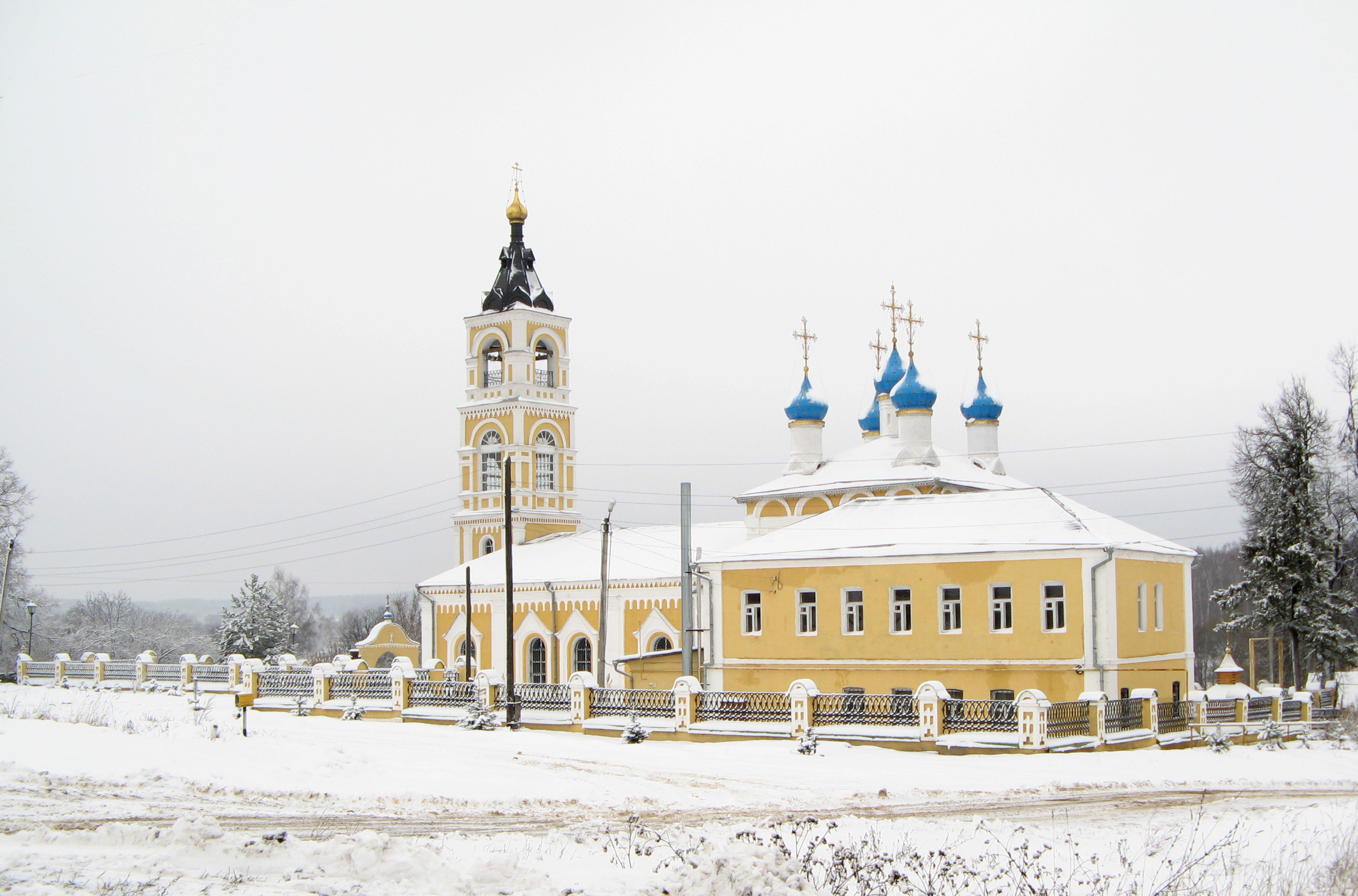
- Church of the Theotokos of Kazan (Lakinsk), Sobinsky District

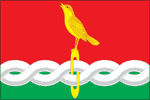
- Flag Coat of arms
- Location of Sobinsky District in Vladimir Oblast
- Coordinates: 55°59′N 40°01′E
- Country: Russia
- Federal subject: Vladimir Oblast
- Established: 10 June 1929
- Administrative center: Sobinka

Area
  - Total: 1,523.8 km^{2} (588.3 sq mi)

Population (2010 Census)
  - Total: 58,801
  - Density: 38.588/km^{2} (99.943/sq mi)
  - Urban: 73.1%
  - Rural: 26.9%

Administrative structure
  - Inhabited localities: 2 cities/towns, 1 urban-type settlements, 195 rural localities

Municipal structure
  - Municipally incorporated as: Sobinsky Municipal District
  - Municipal divisions: 3 urban settlements, 9 rural settlements
- Time zone: UTC+3 (MSK)
- OKTMO ID: 17650000
- Website: http://www.sbnray.ru/

Sobinsky District (Russian: Со́бинский райо́н) is an administrative and municipal district (raion), one of the sixteen in Vladimir Oblast, Russia. It is located in the center and the south of the oblast. The area of the district is 1,523.8 square kilometers (588.3 sq mi). Its administrative center is the town of Sobinka. Population: 50,883 (2021 census); 58,801 (2010 census); 24,864 (2002 Census); 25,549 (1989 Soviet census). The population of Sobinka accounts for 34.3% of the district's total population.
