= Dubrovo =

Dubrovo may refer to several places in Russia:

- Dubrovo, Perm Krai
- Dubrovo, Cherepovetsky District, Vologda Oblast
- Dubrovo, Gorokhovetsky District, Vladimir Oblast
- Dubrovo, Selivanovsky District, Vladimir Oblast
- Dubrovo, Sobinsky District, Vladimir Oblast
- Dubrovo, Vologodsky District, Vologda Oblast
