= Malyshevo =

Malyshevo (Russian: Малышево) is the name of several rural localities in Russia:

- Malyshevo, Kovrovsky District, Vladimir Oblast, a village in Malyginskoye Rural Settlement of Kovrovsky District, Vladimir Oblast
- Malyshevo, Selivanovsky District, Vladimir Oblast, a village in and the administrative center of Malyshevskoye Rural Settlement in Selivanovsky District, Vladimir Oblast
- Malyshevo, Kaduysky District, Vologda Oblast, a village in Nikolskoye Rural Settlement, Kaduysky District, Vologda Oblast
