= Takovikha =

Takovikha Таковиха
- Village
- Location within Vladimir Oblast Location within Russia
- Coordinates: 56°00′N 41°37′E
- Country: Russia
- Region: Vladimir Oblast
- District: Selivanovsky District
- Time zone: UTC+3:00

Takovikha (Russian: Таковиха) is a rural locality (a village) in Volosatovskoye Rural Settlement, Selivanovsky District, Vladimir Oblast, Russia. The population was 3 as of 2010.

== Geography ==
Takovikha is located 32 km north of Krasnaya Gorbatka (the district's administrative centre) by road. Shevinskaya is the nearest rural locality.
