= Savkovo, Selivanovsky District, Vladimir Oblast =

Savkovo Савково
- Village
- Location within Vladimir Oblast Location within Russia
- Coordinates: 55°39′N 41°35′E
- Country: Russia
- Region: Vladimir Oblast
- District: Selivanovsky District
- Time zone: UTC+3:00

Savkovo (Russian: Савково) is a rural locality (a village) in Malyshevskoye Rural Settlement, Selivanovsky District, Vladimir Oblast, Russia. The population was 23 as of 2010.

== Geography ==
Savkovo is located 40 km southwest of Krasnaya Gorbatka (the district's administrative centre) by road. Zakharovo is the nearest rural locality.
