= Pervomaysky, Selivanovsky District, Vladimir Oblast =

Pervomaysky Первомайский
- Settlement
- Location within Vladimir Oblast Location within Russia
- Coordinates: 55°40′N 41°22′E
- Country: Russia
- Region: Vladimir Oblast
- District: Selivanovsky District
- Time zone: UTC+3:00

Pervomaysky (Russian: Первомайский) is a rural locality (a settlement) in Malyshevskoye Rural Settlement, Selivanovsky District, Vladimir Oblast, Russia. The population was 343 as of 2010. There are 8 streets.

== Geography ==
Pervomaysky is located 41 km southwest of Krasnaya Gorbatka (the district's administrative centre) by road. Troitsko-Kolychyovo is the nearest rural locality.
