= Lukoyanikha =

Lukoyanikha Лукояниха
- Village
- Location within Vladimir Oblast Location within Russia
- Coordinates: 55°57′N 41°40′E
- Country: Russia
- Region: Vladimir Oblast
- District: Selivanovsky District
- Time zone: UTC+3:00

Lukoyanikha (Russian: Лукояниха) is a rural locality (a village) in Volosatovskoye Rural Settlement, Selivanovsky District, Vladimir Oblast, Russia. The population was 13 as of 2010.

== Geography ==
Lukoyanikha is located 20 km northwest of Krasnaya Gorbatka (the district's administrative centre) by road. Novy Byt is the nearest rural locality.
