= Kochergino =

Kochergino Кочергино
- Village
- Location within Vladimir Oblast Location within Russia
- Coordinates: 55°42′N 41°24′E
- Country: Russia
- Region: Vladimir Oblast
- District: Selivanovsky District
- Time zone: UTC+3:00

Kochergino (Russian: Кочергино) is a rural locality (a village) in Malyshevskoye Rural Settlement, Selivanovsky District, Vladimir Oblast, Russia. The population was 299 as of 2010. There are 4 streets.

== Geography ==
Kochergino is located 37 km southwest of Krasnaya Gorbatka (the district's administrative centre) by road. Maryevka is the nearest rural locality.
