= Kostenets, Vladimir Oblast =

Kostenets Костенец
- Settlement
- Location within Vladimir Oblast Location within Russia
- Coordinates: 55°48′N 41°25′E
- Country: Russia
- Region: Vladimir Oblast
- District: Selivanovsky District
- Time zone: UTC+3:00

Kostenets (Russian: Костенец) is a rural locality (a settlement) in Malyshevskoye Rural Settlement, Selivanovsky District, Vladimir Oblast, Russia. The population was 260 as of 2010.

== Geography ==
Kostenets is located 37 km southwest of Krasnaya Gorbatka (the district's administrative centre) by road. Yuromka is the nearest rural locality.
