= Delovo =

Delovo Делово
- Village
- Location within Vladimir Oblast Location within Russia
- Coordinates: 55°47′N 41°47′E
- Country: Russia
- Region: Vladimir Oblast
- District: Selivanovsky District
- Time zone: UTC+3:00

Delovo (Russian: Делово) is a rural locality (a village) in Novlyanskoye Rural Settlement, Selivanovsky District, Vladimir Oblast, Russia. The population was 86 as of 2010. There are 3 streets.

== Geography ==
Delovo is located 11 km south of Krasnaya Gorbatka (the district's administrative centre) by road. Parshovo is the nearest rural locality.
