= Shulgino, Vladimir Oblast =

Shulgino Шульгино
- Village
- Location within Vladimir Oblast Location within Russia
- Coordinates: 55°46′N 41°44′E
- Country: Russia
- Region: Vladimir Oblast
- District: Selivanovsky District
- Time zone: UTC+3:00

Church of the Dormition in Shulgino.

Shulgino (Russian: Шульгино) is a rural locality (a village) in Novlyanskoye Rural Settlement, Selivanovsky District, Vladimir Oblast, Russia. The population was 92 as of 2010. There are 5 streets.

== Geography ==
Shulgino is located 12 km south of Krasnaya Gorbatka (the district's administrative centre) by road. Selishche is the nearest rural locality.
