= Neklyudovo, Selivanovsky District, Vladimir Oblast =

Neklyudovo Неклюдово
- Village
- Location within Vladimir Oblast Location within Russia
- Coordinates: 55°44′N 41°32′E
- Country: Russia
- Region: Vladimir Oblast
- District: Selivanovsky District
- Time zone: UTC+3:00

Neklyudovo (Russian: Неклюдово) is a rural locality (a village) in Malyshevskoye Rural Settlement, Selivanovsky District, Vladimir Oblast, Russia. The population was 40 as of 2010.

== Geography ==
Neklyudovo is located 25 km southwest of Krasnaya Gorbatka (the district's administrative centre) by road. Malyshevo is the nearest rural locality.
