= Pchyolkino =

Pchyolkino Пчёлкино
- Village
- Location within Vladimir Oblast Location within Russia
- Coordinates: 55°55′N 41°41′E
- Country: Russia
- Region: Vladimir Oblast
- District: Selivanovsky District
- Time zone: UTC+3:00

Pchyolkino (Russian: Пчёлкино) is a rural locality (a village) in Volosatovskoye Rural Settlement, Selivanovsky District, Vladimir Oblast, Russia. The population was 8 as of 2010.

== Geography ==
Pchyolkino is located 10 km north of Krasnaya Gorbatka (the district's administrative centre) by road. Lukoyanikha is the nearest rural locality.
