= Troitsko-Kolychyovo =

Troitsko-Kolychyovo Троицко-Колычёво
- Village
- Location within Vladimir Oblast Location within Russia
- Coordinates: 55°41′N 41°20′E
- Country: Russia
- Region: Vladimir Oblast
- District: Selivanovsky District
- Time zone: UTC+3:00

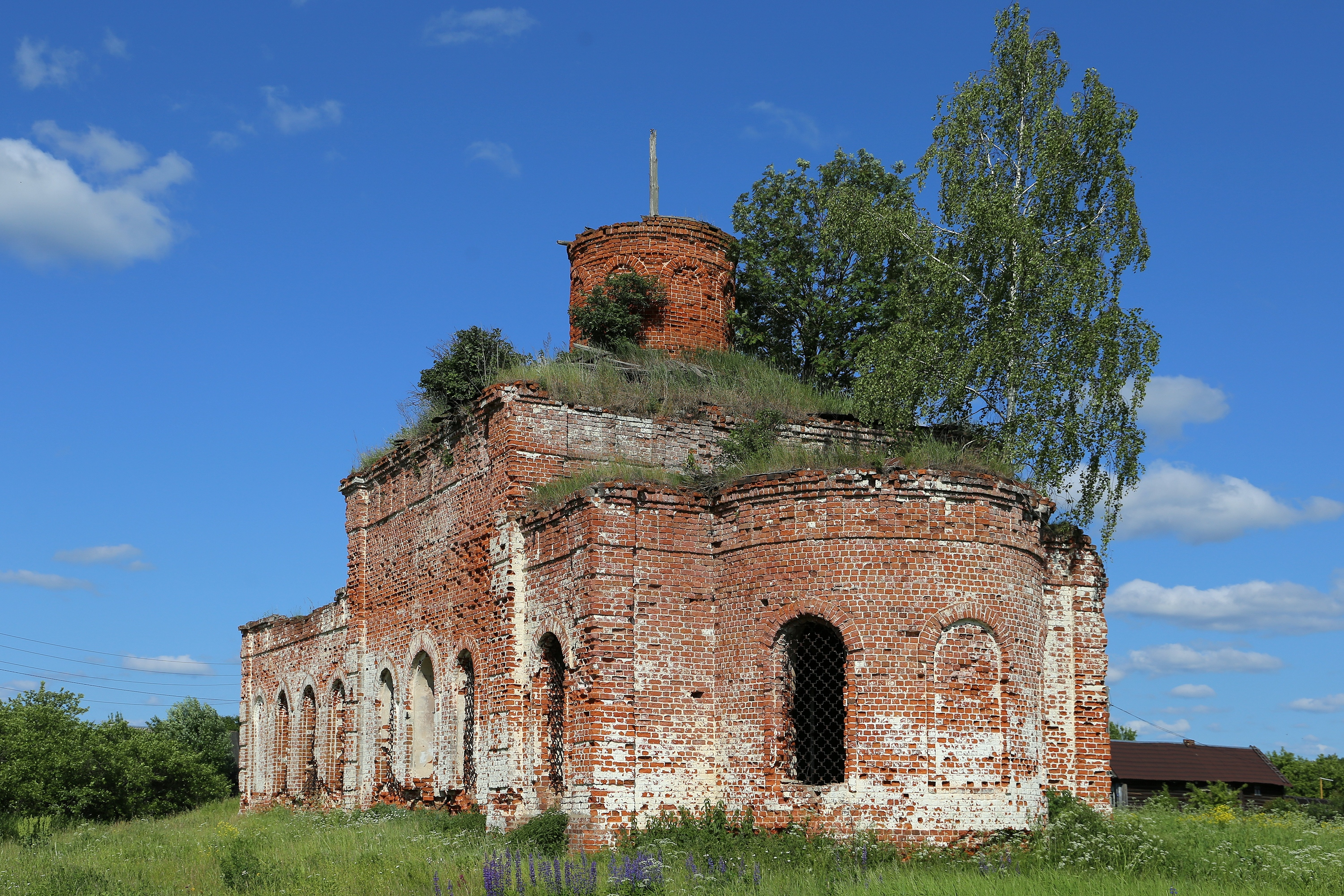

Troitsko-Kolychyovo (Russian: Троицко-Колычёво) is a rural locality (a village) in Malyshevskoye Rural Settlement, Selivanovsky District, Vladimir Oblast, Russia. The population was 15 as of 2010.

== Geography ==
Troitsko-Kolychyovo is located 43 km southwest of Krasnaya Gorbatka (the district's administrative centre) by road. Pervomaysky is the nearest rural locality.
