= Staroye Bibeyevo =

Staroye Bibeyevo Старое Бибеево
- Village
- Location within Vladimir Oblast Location within Russia
- Coordinates: 55°42′N 41°27′E
- Country: Russia
- Region: Vladimir Oblast
- District: Selivanovsky District
- Time zone: UTC+3:00

Staroye Bibeyevo (Russian: Старое Бибеево) is a rural locality (a village) in Malyshevskoye Rural Settlement, Selivanovsky District, Vladimir Oblast, Russia. The population was 6 as of 2010.

== Geography ==
Staroye Bibeyevo is located on the Ushna River, 38 km southwest from Krasnaya Gorbatka (the district's administrative centre) by road. Novoye Bibeyevo is the nearest rural locality.
