= Novy Byt, Selivanovsky District, Vladimir Oblast =

Novy Byt Новый Быт
- Settlement
- Location within Vladimir Oblast Location within Russia
- Coordinates: 55°58′N 41°37′E
- Country: Russia
- Region: Vladimir Oblast
- District: Selivanovsky District
- Time zone: UTC+3:00

Novy Byt (Russian: Новый Быт) is a rural locality (a settlement) and the administrative center of Volosatovskoye Rural Settlement, Selivanovsky District, Vladimir Oblast, Russia. The population was 1,047 as of 2010. There are 17 streets.

== Geography ==
Novy Byt is located 18 km northwest of Krasnaya Gorbatka (the district's administrative centre) by road. Lukoyanikha is the nearest rural locality.
