= Drachyovo =

Drachyovo Драчёво
- Selo
- Location within Vladimir Oblast Location within Russia
- Coordinates: 55°41′N 41°37′E
- Country: Russia
- Region: Vladimir Oblast
- District: Selivanovsky District
- Time zone: UTC+3:00

Drachyovo (Russian: Драчёво) is a rural locality (a selo) in Malyshevskoye Rural Settlement, Selivanovsky District, Vladimir Oblast, Russia. The population was 487 as of 2010. There are 3 streets.

== Geography ==
Drachyovo is located 33 km south of Krasnaya Gorbatka (the district's administrative centre) by road. Nagovitsyno is the nearest rural locality.
