= Novlyanka =

Novlyanka Новлянка
- Village
- Location within Vladimir Oblast Location within Russia
- Coordinates: 55°47′N 41°44′E
- Country: Russia
- Region: Vladimir Oblast
- District: Selivanovsky District
- Time zone: UTC+3:00

Novlyanka (Russian: Новлянка) is a rural locality (a village) and the administrative center of Novlyanskoye Rural Settlement, Selivanovsky District, Vladimir Oblast, Russia. The population was 894 as of 2010. There are 5 streets.

== Geography ==
Novlyanka is located on the right bank of the Ushna River, 9 km south of Krasnaya Gorbatka (the district's administrative centre) by road. Lobanovo is the nearest rural locality.
