= Yesipovo =

Yesipovo Есипово
- Village
- Location within Vladimir Oblast Location within Russia
- Coordinates: 55°54′N 41°47′E
- Country: Russia
- Region: Vladimir Oblast
- District: Selivanovsky District
- Time zone: UTC+3:00

Yesipovo (Russian: Есипово) is a rural locality (a village) in Chertkovskoye Rural Settlement, Selivanovsky District, Vladimir Oblast, Russia. According to the 2010 census, the population was 23.

Mercedes-Benz has opened a factory called Mosvocia (its first in Russia) near Yesipovo in April 2019.

== Geography ==
Yesipovo is on the Kestromka River, 7 km north of Krasnaya Gorbatka (the district's administrative centre) by road. Voshchikha is the nearest rural locality.
