= Nikulino, Selivanovsky District, Vladimir Oblast =

Nikulino Никулино
- Selo
- Location within Vladimir Oblast Location within Russia
- Coordinates: 55°37′N 41°41′E
- Country: Russia
- Region: Vladimir Oblast
- District: Selivanovsky District
- Time zone: UTC+3:00

Nikulino (Russian: Никулино) is a rural locality (a selo) in Malyshevskoye Rural Settlement, Selivanovsky District, Vladimir Oblast, Russia. The population was 2 as of 2010.

== Geography ==
Nikulino is located 36 km south of Krasnaya Gorbatka (the district's administrative centre) by road. Poshatovo is the nearest rural locality.
