= Mokrovo =

Mokrovo Мокрово
- Village
- Location within Vladimir Oblast Location within Russia
- Coordinates: 55°58′N 41°52′E
- Country: Russia
- Region: Vladimir Oblast
- District: Selivanovsky District
- Time zone: UTC+3:00

Mokrovo (Russian: Мокрово) is a rural locality (a village) in Chertkovskoye Rural Settlement, Selivanovsky District, Vladimir Oblast, Russia. The population was 1 as of 2010.

== Geography ==
Mokrovo is located on the Tetrukh River, 27 km northeast from Krasnaya Gorbatka (the district's administrative centre) by road. Goritsy is the nearest rural locality.
