= Sanchugovo =

Sanchugovo Санчугово
- Village
- Location within Vladimir Oblast Location within Russia
- Coordinates: 55°41′N 41°40′E
- Country: Russia
- Region: Vladimir Oblast
- District: Selivanovsky District
- Time zone: UTC+3:00

Sanchugovo (Russian: Санчугово) is a rural locality (a village) in Malyshevskoye Rural Settlement, Selivanovsky District, Vladimir Oblast, Russia. The population was 6 as of 2010.

== Geography ==
Sanchugovo is located 30 km south of Krasnaya Gorbatka (the district's administrative centre) by road. Gubino is the nearest rural locality.
