= Senkovo, Selivanovsky District, Vladimir Oblast =

Senkovo Сеньково
- Village
- Location within Vladimir Oblast Location within Russia
- Coordinates: 55°51′N 41°27′E
- Country: Russia
- Region: Vladimir Oblast
- District: Selivanovsky District
- Time zone: UTC+3:00

Senkovo (Russian: Сеньково) is a rural locality (a village) in Volosatovskoye Rural Settlement, Selivanovsky District, Vladimir Oblast, Russia. The population was 2 as of 2010.

== Geography ==
Senkovo is located 21 km west of Krasnaya Gorbatka (the district's administrative centre) by road. Skalovo is the nearest rural locality.
