= Mityakovo =

Mityakovo Митяково
- Village
- Location within Vladimir Oblast Location within Russia
- Coordinates: 55°57′N 41°46′E
- Country: Russia
- Region: Vladimir Oblast
- District: Selivanovsky District
- Time zone: UTC+3:00

Mityakovo (Russian: Митяково) is a rural locality (a village) in Chertkovskoye Rural Settlement, Selivanovsky District, Vladimir Oblast, Russia. The population was 6 as of 2010.

== Geography ==
Mityakovo is located 14 km north from Krasnaya Gorbatka (the district's administrative centre) by road. Bolshoye Grigorovo is the nearest rural locality.
