= Nikolo-Ushna =

Nikolo-Ushna Николо-Ушна
- Village
- Location within Vladimir Oblast Location within Russia
- Coordinates: 55°44′N 41°26′E
- Country: Russia
- Region: Vladimir Oblast
- District: Selivanovsky District
- Time zone: UTC+3:00

Nikolo-Ushna (Russian: Николо-Ушна) is a rural locality (a village) in Malyshevskoye Rural Settlement, Selivanovsky District, Vladimir Oblast, Russia. The population was 47 as of 2010.

== Geography ==
Nikolo-Ushna is located on the Ushna River, 32 km southwest of Krasnaya Gorbatka (the district's administrative centre) by road. Karpovo is the nearest rural locality.
