= Korelkino =

Korelkino Корелкино
- Village
- Location within Vladimir Oblast Location within Russia
- Coordinates: 55°41′N 41°38′E
- Country: Russia
- Region: Vladimir Oblast
- District: Selivanovsky District
- Time zone: UTC+3:00

Korelkino (Russian: Корелкино) is a rural locality (a village) in Malyshevskoye Rural Settlement, Selivanovsky District, Vladimir Oblast, Russia. The population was 11 as of 2010.

== Geography ==
Korelkino is located 36 km south of Krasnaya Gorbatka (the district's administrative centre) by road. Drachyovo is the nearest rural locality.
