= Vysokovo, Selivanovsky District, Vladimir Oblast =

Vysokovo Высоково
- Village
- Location within Vladimir Oblast Location within Russia
- Coordinates: 55°50′N 41°46′E
- Country: Russia
- Region: Vladimir Oblast
- District: Selivanovsky District
- Time zone: UTC+3:00

Vysokovo (Russian: Высоково) is a rural locality (a village) in Novlyanskoye Rural Settlement, Selivanovsky District, Vladimir Oblast, Russia. The population was 539 as of 2010. There are 5 streets.

== Geography ==
Vysokovo is located on the Ushna River, 4 km south of Krasnaya Gorbatka (the district's administrative centre) by road. Andreyevka is the nearest rural locality.
