= Savino, Selivanovsky District, Vladimir Oblast =

Savino Савино
- Village
- Location within Vladimir Oblast Location within Russia
- Coordinates: 55°42′N 41°41′E
- Country: Russia
- Region: Vladimir Oblast
- District: Selivanovsky District
- Time zone: UTC+3:00

Savino (Russian: Савино) is a rural locality (a village) in Malyshevskoye Rural Settlement, Selivanovsky District, Vladimir Oblast, Russia. The population was 19 as of 2010.

== Geography ==
Savino is located 20 km south of Krasnaya Gorbatka (the district's administrative centre) by road. Fedorkovo is the nearest rural locality.
