= Nagovitsyno =

Nagovitsyno Наговицыно
- Village
- Location within Vladimir Oblast Location within Russia
- Coordinates: 55°40′N 41°38′E
- Country: Russia
- Region: Vladimir Oblast
- District: Selivanovsky District
- Time zone: UTC+3:00

Nagovitsyno (Russian: Наговицыно) is a rural locality (a village) in Malyshevskoye Rural Settlement, Selivanovsky District, Vladimir Oblast, Russia. The population was 2 as of 2010.

== Geography ==
The village is located 10 km south-east from Malyshevo, 27 km south from Krasnaya Gorbatka.
