= Bolshoye Ugryumovo =

Bolshoye Ugryumovo Большое Угрюмово
- Village
- Location within Vladimir Oblast Location within Russia
- Coordinates: 55°41′N 41°34′E
- Country: Russia
- Region: Vladimir Oblast
- District: Selivanovsky District
- Time zone: UTC+3:00

Bolshoye Ugryumovo (Russian: Большое Угрюмово) is a rural locality (a village) in Malyshevskoye Rural Settlement, Selivanovsky District, Vladimir Oblast, Russia. The population was 29 as of 2010.

== Geography ==
Bolshoye Ugryumovo is located 32 km southwest of Krasnaya Gorbatka (the district's administrative centre) by road. Drachyovo is the nearest rural locality.
