= Krasnaya Ushna =

Krasnaya Ushna Красная Ушна
- Settlement
- Location within Vladimir Oblast Location within Russia
- Coordinates: 55°47′N 41°33′E
- Country: Russia
- Region: Vladimir Oblast
- District: Selivanovsky District
- Time zone: UTC+3:00

Krasnaya Ushna (Russian: Красная Ушна) is a rural locality (a settlement) in Malyshevskoye Rural Settlement, Selivanovsky District, Vladimir Oblast, Russia. The population was 553 as of 2010. There are 9 streets.

== Geography ==
Krasnaya Ushna is located on the Ushna River, 17 km southwest of Krasnaya Gorbatka (the district's administrative centre) by road. Yartsevo is the nearest rural locality.
