= Shiryayevo, Vladimir Oblast =

Shiryayevo Ширяево
- Village
- Location within Vladimir Oblast Location within Russia
- Coordinates: 55°57′N 41°54′E
- Country: Russia
- Region: Vladimir Oblast
- District: Selivanovsky District
- Time zone: UTC+3:00

Shiryayevo (Russian: Ширяево) is a rural locality (a village) in Chertkovskoye Rural Settlement, Selivanovsky District, Vladimir Oblast, Russia. The population was 20 as of 2010. There are 2 streets.

== Geography ==
Shiryayevo is located 23 km northeast of Krasnaya Gorbatka (the district's administrative centre) by road. Nadezhdino is the nearest rural locality.
