= Ivonino =

Ivonino Ивонино
- Village
- Location within Vladimir Oblast Location within Russia
- Coordinates: 55°57′N 41°33′E
- Country: Russia
- Region: Vladimir Oblast
- District: Selivanovsky District
- Time zone: UTC+3:00

Ivonino (Russian: Ивонино) is a rural locality (a village) in Volosatovskoye Rural Settlement, Selivanovsky District, Vladimir Oblast, Russia. The population was 10 as of 2010.

== Geography ==
Ivonino is located 19 km northwest from Krasnaya Gorbatka (the district's administrative centre) by road. Denisovo is the nearest rural locality.
