= Parshovo =

Parshovo Паршово
- Village
- Location within Vladimir Oblast Location within Russia
- Coordinates: 55°48′N 41°47′E
- Country: Russia
- Region: Vladimir Oblast
- District: Selivanovsky District
- Time zone: UTC+3:00

Parshovo (Russian: Паршово) is a rural locality (a village) in Novlyanskoye Rural Settlement, Selivanovsky District, Vladimir Oblast, Russia. The population was 3 as of 2010.

== Geography ==
Parshovo is located 12 km south of Krasnaya Gorbatka (the district's administrative centre) by road. Delovo is the nearest rural locality.
