= Belkovo, Selivanovsky District, Vladimir Oblast =

Belkovo Бельково
- Village
- Location within Vladimir Oblast Location within Russia
- Coordinates: 55°50′N 41°41′E
- Country: Russia
- Region: Vladimir Oblast
- District: Selivanovsky District
- Time zone: UTC+3:00

Belkovo (Russian: Бельково) is a rural locality (a village) in Novlyanskoye Rural Settlement, Selivanovsky District, Vladimir Oblast, Russia. The population was 40 as of 2010.

== Geography ==
Belkovo is located 6 km southwest of Krasnaya Gorbatka (the district's administrative centre) by road. Khvostsovo is the nearest rural locality.
