= Novoye Bibeyevo =

Novoye Bibeyevo Новое Бибеево
- Village
- Location within Vladimir Oblast Location within Russia
- Coordinates: 55°42′N 41°27′E
- Country: Russia
- Region: Vladimir Oblast
- District: Selivanovsky District
- Time zone: UTC+3:00

Novoye Bibeyevo (Russian: Новое Бибеево) is a rural locality (a village) in Malyshevskoye Rural Settlement, Selivanovsky District, Vladimir Oblast, Russia. The population was 10 as of 2010.

== Geography ==
Novoye Bibeyevo is located on the Ushna River, 36 km southwest of Krasnaya Gorbatka (the district's administrative centre) by road. Staroye Bibeyevo is the nearest rural locality.
