= Selishchi =

Selishchi (Russian: Селищи) is the name of several rural localities in Russia.

== Ivanovo Oblast ==
As of 2022, two rural localities in Ivanovo Oblast bear this name:

- Selishchi, Lukhsky District, Ivanovo Oblast, a village in Lukhsky District
- Selishchi, Yuzhsky District, Ivanovo Oblast, a village in Yuzhsky District

== Republic of Mordovia ==
As of 2022, three rural localities in the Republic of Mordovia bear this name:

- Selishchi, Atyashevsky District, Republic of Mordovia, a selo in Selishchinsky Selsoviet of Atyashevsky District
- Selishchi, Ichalkovsky District, Republic of Mordovia, a selo in Beregovo-Syresevsky Selsoviet of Ichalkovsky District
- Selishchi, Krasnoslobodsky District, Republic of Mordovia, a selo in Selishchinsky Selsoviet of Krasnoslobodsky District

== Nizhny Novgorod Oblast ==
As of 2022, three rural localities in Nizhny Novgorod Oblast bear this name:

- Selishchi, Krasnoslobodsky Selsoviet, Bor, Nizhny Novgorod Oblast, a village in Krasnoslobodsky Selsoviet of the town of oblast significance of Bor
- Selishchi, Yamnovsky Selsoviet, Bor, Nizhny Novgorod Oblast, a selo in Yamnovsky Selsoviet of the town of oblast significance of Bor
- Selishchi, Perevozsky District, Nizhny Novgorod Oblast, a village in Tsentralny Selsoviet of Perevozsky District

== Novgorod Oblast ==
As of 2022, three rural localities in Novgorod Oblast bear this name:

- Selishchi, Chudovsky District, Novgorod Oblast, a village in Tregubovskoye Settlement of Chudovsky District
- Selishchi, Malovishersky District, Novgorod Oblast, a village under the administrative jurisdiction of the town of district significance of Malaya Vishera, Malovishersky District
- Selishchi, Soletsky District, Novgorod Oblast, a village in Dubrovskoye Settlement of Soletsky District

== Pskov Oblast ==
As of 2022, one rural locality in Pskov Oblast bears this name:

- Selishchi, Pskov Oblast, a village in Sebezhsky District

== Ryazan Oblast ==
As of 2022, one rural locality in Ryazan Oblast bears this name:

- Selishchi, Ryazan Oblast, a selo in Akhmatovsky Rural Okrug of Kasimovsky District

== Tver Oblast ==
As of 2022, five rural localities in Tver Oblast bear this name:

- Selishchi (Semendyayevskoye Rural Settlement), Kalyazinsky District, Tver Oblast, a village in Kalyazinsky District; municipally, a part of Semendyayevskoye Rural Settlement of that district
- Selishchi (Nerlskoye Rural Settlement), Kalyazinsky District, Tver Oblast, name of two villages in Kalyazinsky District; municipally, a part of Nerlskoye Rural Settlement of that district
- Selishchi, Kimrsky District, Tver Oblast, a village in Kimrsky District
- Selishchi, Maksatikhinsky District, Tver Oblast, a village in Maksatikhinsky District

== Vladimir Oblast ==
As of 2022, one rural locality in Vladimir Oblast bears this name:

- Selishchi, Vladimir Oblast, a village in Selivanovsky District

== Yaroslavl Oblast ==
As of 2022, one rural locality in Yaroslavl Oblast bears this name:

- Selishchi, Yaroslavl Oblast, a village in Stoginsky Rural Okrug of Gavrilov-Yamsky District
