= Maloye Grigorovo =

Maloye Grigorovo Малое Григорово
- Village
- Location within Vladimir Oblast Location within Russia
- Coordinates: 55°57′N 41°44′E
- Country: Russia
- Region: Vladimir Oblast
- District: Selivanovsky District
- Time zone: UTC+3:00

Maloye Grigorovo (Russian: Малое Григорово) is a rural locality (a village) in Chertkovskoye Rural Settlement, Selivanovsky District, Vladimir Oblast, Russia. The population was 4 as of 2010.

== Geography ==
Maloye Grigorovo is located on the Kestromka River, 18 km north of Krasnaya Gorbatka (the district's administrative centre) by road. Pribrezhnaya is the nearest rural locality.
