= Ivankovo (Chertkovskoye Rural Settlement), Selivanovsky District, Vladimir Oblast =

Ivankovo Иваньково
- Village
- Location within Vladimir Oblast Location within Russia
- Coordinates: 55°58′N 41°59′E
- Country: Russia
- Region: Vladimir Oblast
- District: Selivanovsky District
- Time zone: UTC+3:00

Ivankovo (Russian: Иваньково) is a rural locality (a village) in Chertkovskoye Rural Settlement, Selivanovsky District, Vladimir Oblast, Russia. The population was 57 as of 2010.

== Geography ==
The village is located on the Motra River, 5 km north from Chertkovo, 25 km north-east from Krasnaya Gorbatka.
