= Yuromka =

Yuromka Юромка
- Village
- Location within Vladimir Oblast Location within Russia
- Coordinates: 55°47′N 41°28′E
- Country: Russia
- Region: Vladimir Oblast
- District: Selivanovsky District
- Time zone: UTC+3:00

Yuromka (Russian: Юромка) is a rural locality (a village) in Malyshevskoye Rural Settlement, Selivanovsky District, Vladimir Oblast, Russia. The population was 82 as of 2010.

== Geography ==
Yuromka is located on the Ushna River, 35 km southwest from Krasnaya Gorbatka (the district's administrative centre) by road. Kostenets is the nearest rural locality.
