= Nadezhdino, Vladimir Oblast =

Nadezhdino Надеждино
- Village
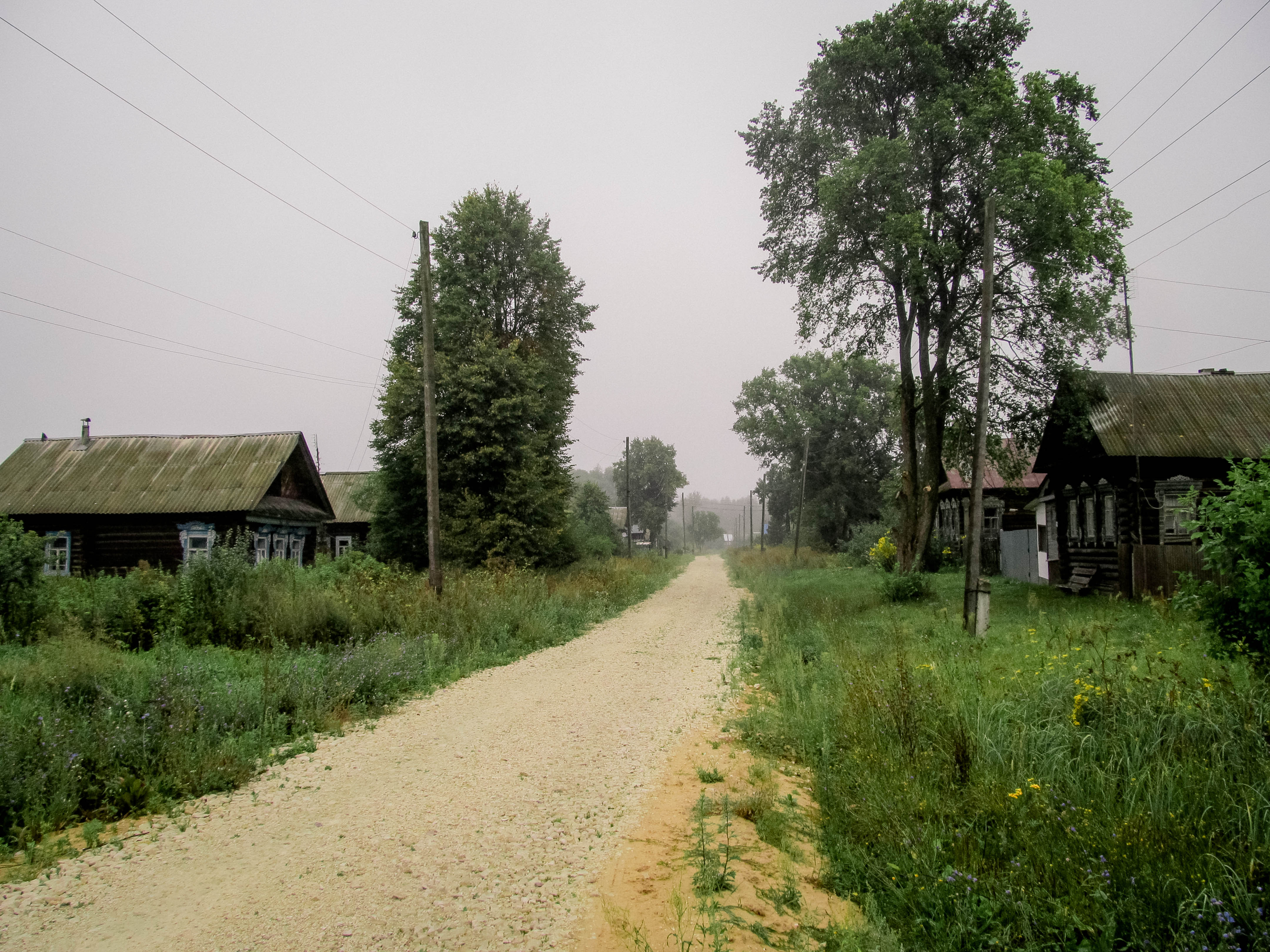

- Location within Vladimir Oblast Location within Russia
- Coordinates: 55°56′N 41°54′E
- Country: Russia
- Region: Vladimir Oblast
- District: Selivanovsky District
- Time zone: UTC+3:00

Nadezhdino (Russian: Надеждино) is a rural locality (a village) in Chertkovskoye Rural Settlement, Selivanovsky District, Vladimir Oblast, Russia. The population was 165 as of 2010. There are 4 streets.

== Geography ==
Nadezhdino is located on the Tetrukh River, 21 km northeast of Krasnaya Gorbatka (the district's administrative centre) by road. Chernovskaya is the nearest rural locality.
