= Karpovo, Selivanovsky District, Vladimir Oblast =

Karpovo Карпово
- Village
- Location within Vladimir Oblast Location within Russia
- Coordinates: 55°44′N 41°24′E
- Country: Russia
- Region: Vladimir Oblast
- District: Selivanovsky District
- Time zone: UTC+3:00

Karpovo (Russian: Карпово) is a rural locality (a village) in Malyshevskoye Rural Settlement, Selivanovsky District, Vladimir Oblast, Russia. The population was 55 as of 2010.

== Geography ==
Karpovo is located 36 km southwest of Krasnaya Gorbatka (the district's administrative centre) by road. Nikolo-Ushna is the nearest rural locality.
