= Perelozhnikovo =

Perelozhnikovo Переложниково
- Village
- Location within Vladimir Oblast Location within Russia
- Coordinates: 55°44′N 41°36′E
- Country: Russia
- Region: Vladimir Oblast
- District: Selivanovsky District
- Time zone: UTC+3:00

Perelozhnikovo (Russian: Переложниково) is a rural locality (a village) in Malyshevskoye Rural Settlement, Selivanovsky District, Vladimir Oblast, Russia. The population was 403 as of 2010. There are 5 streets.

== Geography ==
Perelozhnikovo is located 20 km southwest of Krasnaya Gorbatka (the district's administrative centre) by road. Bolshoye Koltsovo is the nearest rural locality.
