= Gubino, Vladimir Oblast =

Gubino Губино
- Village
- Location within Vladimir Oblast Location within Russia
- Coordinates: 55°41′N 41°40′E
- Country: Russia
- Region: Vladimir Oblast
- District: Selivanovsky District
- Time zone: UTC+3:00

Gubino (Russian: Губино) is a rural locality (a village) in Malyshevskoye Rural Settlement, Selivanovsky District, Vladimir Oblast, Russia. The population was 468 as of 2010. There are 5 streets.

== Geography ==
Gubino is located 30 km south of Krasnaya Gorbatka (the district's administrative centre) by road. Nagovitsyno is the nearest rural locality.
