= Kopnino, Selivanovsky District, Vladimir Oblast =

Kopnino Копнино
- Village
- Location within Vladimir Oblast Location within Russia
- Coordinates: 55°55′N 41°37′E
- Country: Russia
- Region: Vladimir Oblast
- District: Selivanovsky District
- Time zone: UTC+3:00

Kopnino (Russian: Копнино) is a rural locality (a village) in Volosatovskoye Rural Settlement, Selivanovsky District, Vladimir Oblast, Russia. The population was 369 as of 2010. There are 3 streets.

== Geography ==
Kopnino is located on the Kestromka River, 12 km northwest of Krasnaya Gorbatka (the district's administrative centre) by road. Matveyevka is the nearest rural locality.
