= Bolshoye Grigorovo, Selivanovsky District, Vladimir Oblast =

Bolshoye Grigorovo Большое Григорово
- Village
- Location within Vladimir Oblast Location within Russia
- Coordinates: 55°58′N 41°45′E
- Country: Russia
- Region: Vladimir Oblast
- District: Selivanovsky District
- Time zone: UTC+3:00

Bolshoye Grigorovo (Russian: Большое Григорово) is a rural locality (a village) in Chertkovskoye Rural Settlement, Selivanovsky District, Vladimir Oblast, Russia. The population was 10 as of 2010.

== Geography ==
Bolshoye Grigorovo is located on the Kestromka River, 15 km north of Krasnaya Gorbatka (the district's administrative centre) by road. Pribrezhnaya is the nearest rural locality.
