= Skalovo =

Skalovo Скалово
- Village
- Location within Vladimir Oblast Location within Russia
- Coordinates: 55°52′N 41°31′E
- Country: Russia
- Region: Vladimir Oblast
- District: Selivanovsky District
- Time zone: UTC+3:00

Skalovo (Russian: Скалово) is a rural locality (a village) in Volosatovskoye Rural Settlement, Selivanovsky District, Vladimir Oblast, Russia. The population was 39 as of 2010.

== Geography ==
Skalovo is located 20 km west of Krasnaya Gorbatka (the district's administrative centre) by road. Matveyevka is the nearest rural locality.
