= Khvostsovo =

Khvostsovo Хвосцово
- Village
- Location within Vladimir Oblast Location within Russia
- Coordinates: 55°51′N 41°42′E
- Country: Russia
- Region: Vladimir Oblast
- District: Selivanovsky District
- Time zone: UTC+3:00

Khvostsovo (Russian: Хвосцово) is a rural locality (a village) in Novlyanskoye Rural Settlement, Selivanovsky District, Vladimir Oblast, Russia. The population was 41 as of 2010.

== Geography ==
Khvostsovo is located 8 km west of Krasnaya Gorbatka (the district's administrative centre) by road. Yershovo is the nearest rural locality.
