= Voshchikha =

Voshchikha Вощиха
- Village
- Location within Vladimir Oblast Location within Russia
- Coordinates: 55°55′N 41°48′E
- Country: Russia
- Region: Vladimir Oblast
- District: Selivanovsky District
- Time zone: UTC+3:00

Voshchikha (Russian: Вощиха) is a rural locality (a village) in Chertkovskoye Rural Settlement, Selivanovsky District, Vladimir Oblast, Russia. The population was 33 as of 2010.

== Geography ==
Voshchikha is located on the Tetrukh River, 9 km northeast of Krasnaya Gorbatka (the district's administrative centre) by road. Yesipovo is the nearest rural locality.
