= Ivankovo (Malyshevskoye Rural Settlement), Selivanovsky District, Vladimir Oblast =

Ivankovo Иваньково
- Village
- Location within Vladimir Oblast Location within Russia
- Coordinates: 55°43′N 41°42′E
- Country: Russia
- Region: Vladimir Oblast
- District: Selivanovsky District
- Time zone: UTC+3:00

Ivankovo (Russian: Иваньково) is a rural locality (a village) in Malyshevskoye Rural Settlement, Selivanovsky District, Vladimir Oblast, Russia. The population was 9 as of 2010.

== Geography ==
The village is located 15 km east from Malyshevo, 19 km south from Krasnaya Gorbatka.
