= Alyoshkovo =

Alyoshkovo Алёшково
- Village
- Location within Vladimir Oblast Location within Russia
- Coordinates: 55°59′N 41°59′E
- Country: Russia
- Region: Vladimir Oblast
- District: Selivanovsky District
- Time zone: UTC+3:00

Alyoshkovo (Russian: Алёшково) is a rural locality (a village) in Chertkovskoye Rural Settlement, Selivanovsky District, Vladimir Oblast, Russia. The population was 4 as of 2010.

== Geography ==
Alyoshkovo is located 30 km northeast of Krasnaya Gorbatka (the district's administrative centre) by road. Ivankovo is the nearest rural locality.
