= Tuchkovo, Vladimir Oblast =

Tuchkovo Тучково
- Selo
- Location within Vladimir Oblast Location within Russia
- Coordinates: 55°53′N 41°39′E
- Country: Russia
- Region: Vladimir Oblast
- District: Selivanovsky District
- Time zone: UTC+3:00

Tuchkovo (Russian: Тучково) is a rural locality (a selo) in Volosatovskoye Rural Settlement, Selivanovsky District, Vladimir Oblast, Russia. The population was 9 as of 2010.

== Geography ==
Tuchkovo is located on the Kolp River, 11 km northwest from Krasnaya Gorbatka (the district's administrative centre) by road. Krasnaya Gorbatka is the nearest rural locality.
