= Zhary, Selivanovsky District, Vladimir Oblast =

Zhary Жары
- Village
- Location within Vladimir Oblast Location within Russia
- Coordinates: 55°48′N 41°31′E
- Country: Russia
- Region: Vladimir Oblast
- District: Selivanovsky District
- Time zone: UTC+3:00

Zhary (Russian: Жары) is a rural locality (a village) in Malyshevskoye Rural Settlement, Selivanovsky District, Vladimir Oblast, Russia. The population was 22 as of 2010.

== Geography ==
Zhary is located on the Ushna River, 21 km southwest of Krasnaya Gorbatka (the district's administrative centre) by road. Krasnaya Ushna is the nearest rural locality.
