= Maryevka, Vladimir Oblast =

Maryevka Марьевка
- Village
- Location within Vladimir Oblast Location within Russia
- Coordinates: 55°42′N 41°23′E
- Country: Russia
- Region: Vladimir Oblast
- District: Selivanovsky District
- Time zone: UTC+3:00

Maryevka (Russian: Марьевка) is a rural locality (a village) in Malyshevskoye Rural Settlement, Selivanovsky District, Vladimir Oblast, Russia. The population was 25 as of 2010.

== Geography ==
Maryevka is located 38 km southwest of Krasnaya Gorbatka (the district's administrative centre) by road. Kochergino is the nearest rural locality.
