= Selishchi, Vladimir Oblast =

Selishchi Селищи
- Village
- Location within Vladimir Oblast Location within Russia
- Coordinates: 55°45′N 41°45′E
- Country: Russia
- Region: Vladimir Oblast
- District: Selivanovsky District
- Time zone: UTC+3:00

Selishchi (Russian: Селищи) is a rural locality (a village) in Novlyanskoye Rural Settlement, Selivanovsky District, Vladimir Oblast, Russia. The population was 32 as of 2010.

== Geography ==
Selishchi is located 13 km south of Krasnaya Gorbatka (the district's administrative centre) by road. Shulgino is the nearest rural locality.
