= Oznobishino =

Oznobishino (Russian: Ознобишино) is the name of several rural localities in Russia:

- Oznobishino, Moscow, a selo in Shchapovskoye Settlement of Troitsky Administrative Okrug in the federal city of Moscow
- Oznobishino, Nizhny Novgorod Oblast, a village in Veryakushsky Selsoviet of Diveyevsky District in Nizhny Novgorod Oblast; 55°10′N 43°43′E
- Oznobishino, Vladimir Oblast, a village in Selivanovsky District of Vladimir Oblast
