= 2013 Oznobishino bus crash =

Motor vehicle incident in Russia

Coordinates: 55.3974°N 37.4386°E

- Location of Moscow Oblast in Russia

Details
- Date: 13 July 2013
- Location: Oznobishino, Moscow Oblast, Russia

Statistics
- Deaths: 18
- Injured: 60

The 2013 Oznobishino bus crash occurred on 13 July 2013 at about 13:00 local time (09:00 UTC) when a bus carrying 64 people was hit by a KAMAZ truck in Oznobishino, Moscow Oblast, about 25 miles (40 km) southwest of Moscow. At least 18 people died and another 60 people were injured, with 12 of them in critical condition. 14 of the victims died at the scene and another four died in hospital. The bus had been travelling from Podolsk to Kurkino when the accident occurred, ripping its back half off.

== Crash ==
The truck driver was thrown out of his vehicle and survived the impact, as did the bus driver, though both were injured. The truck driver has been identified as a 46-year-old named Hrachya Harutyunyan (Арутюнян Грачья). The truck itself is reportedly owned by a private company. The Russian authorities declared the following Monday to be a day of mourning in Moscow following the accident. The driver was subsequently charged with violating traffic rules and faces up to seven years' imprisonment if convicted. Sogaz, the company responsible for insuring the bus, said that it would pay the families of each of the deceased a sum of around 2 million rubles ($60,000) in compensation, while the injured would receive around 600,000 rubles ($20,000) each.

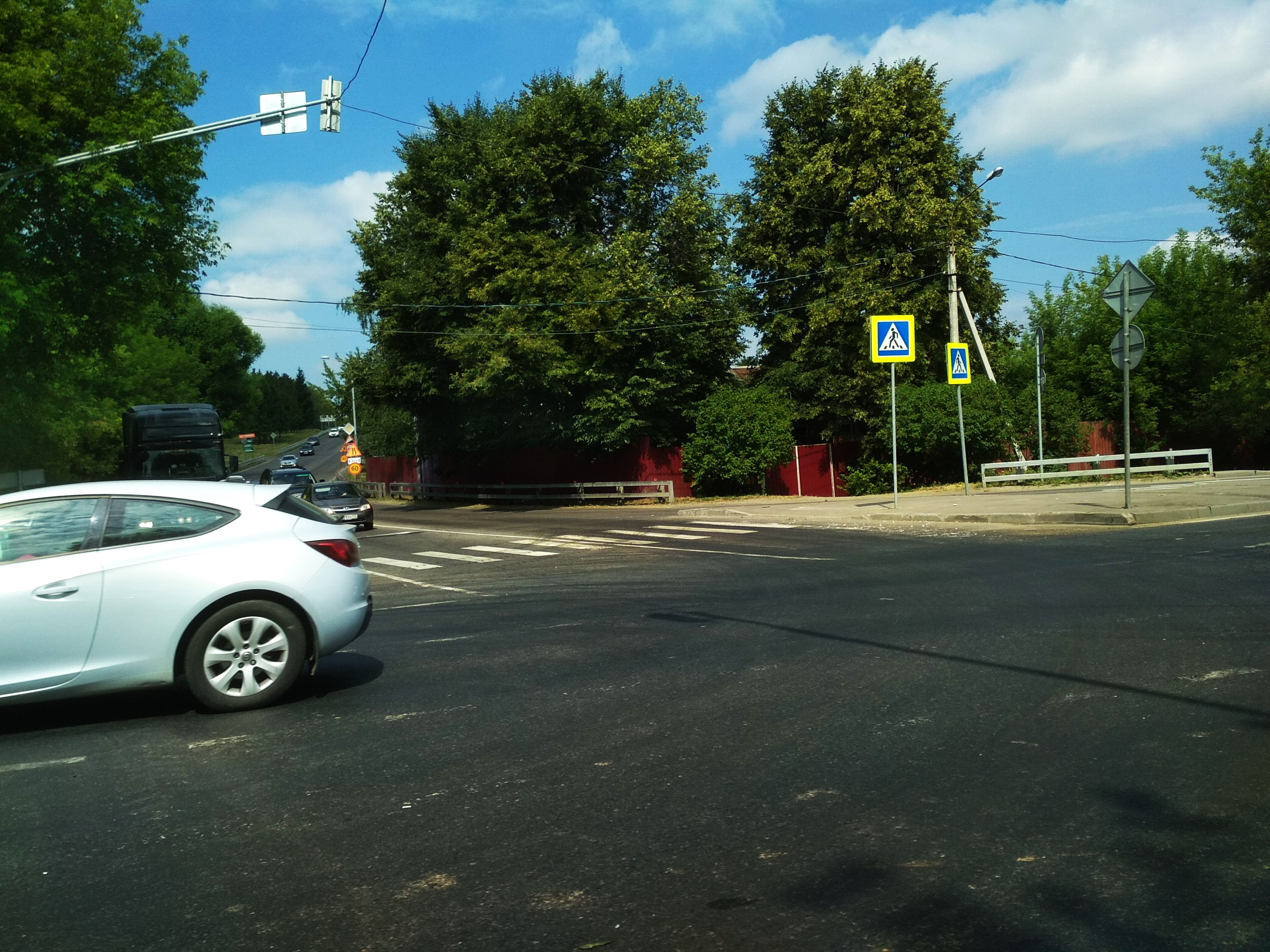
Перекресток Ознобишино — Александрово

The circumstances of the crash prompted a debate about whether the layout of the road had been a contributing factor and whether further measures were needed to crack down on bad driving. Andrei Vorobyov, the acting governor of the Moscow region, called for a tightening of the rules on public transport and goods vehicles. He also announced an inspection of the region's public buses and "difficult crossroads". Viktor Pokhmelkin, the head of the Movement of Russian Motorists, said that there was a history of frequent collisions at the intersection where the crash occurred. A widely read Russian blogger, Rustem Adagamov, argued that the road from which the truck driver occurred was winding and lacked traffic signs, preventing the truck driver from seeing the bus in time, though a survivor from the bus said that she had seen the truck coming from some distance away. The truck may also have been overloaded and may have had faulty brakes.

Questions were also raised about tightening vehicle licensing rules. The truck had reportedly been using expired transit plates, temporary licence plates that are only supposed to be used on new cars. They are used illegally to evade vehicle checks in the police national vehicle database and to evade paying taxes. A Russian legislator proposed increasing the penalties for driving illegally using such plates, while another legislator announced measures requiring holders of foreign commercial drivers' licences to acquire an equivalent Russian driving licence.

== Court hearings and reaction in Armenia ==
Court hearings of Hrachya Harutyunyan started on 15 July 2013. He was brought into the courthouse wearing inappropriate clothing, a women's dressing-gown. This sparked discontent in Armenia. A protest was held in front of the Russian embassy in Yerevan on 16 July.

== See also ==
- 2009 Rostov-on-Don bus crash
