= Dubrovo, Selivanovsky District, Vladimir Oblast =

Dubrovo Дуброво
- Selo
- Location within Vladimir Oblast Location within Russia
- Coordinates: 55°48′N 41°51′E
- Country: Russia
- Region: Vladimir Oblast
- District: Selivanovsky District
- Time zone: UTC+3:00

Dubrovo (Russian: Дуброво) is a rural locality (a selo) in Novlyanskoye Rural Settlement, Selivanovsky District, Vladimir Oblast, Russia. The population was 95 as of 2010. There are 4 streets.

== Geography ==
Dubrovo is located on the Ushna River, 15 km southeast of Krasnaya Gorbatka (the district's administrative centre) by road. Kondrakovo is the nearest rural locality.
