= Malyshevo, Selivanovsky District, Vladimir Oblast =

Malyshevo Малышево
- Selo
- Location within Vladimir Oblast Location within Russia
- Coordinates: 55°43′N 41°32′E
- Country: Russia
- Region: Vladimir Oblast
- District: Selivanovsky District
- Time zone: UTC+3:00

Malyshevo (Russian: Малышево) is a rural locality (a selo) and the administrative center of Malyshevskoye Rural Settlement, Selivanovsky District, Vladimir Oblast, Russia. The population was 799 as of 2010. There are 9 streets.

== Geography ==
Malyshevo is located 26 km southwest of Krasnaya Gorbatka (the district's administrative centre) by road. Mitrofanovo is the nearest rural locality.
