= Oznobishino, Vladimir Oblast =

Oznobishino Ознобишино
- village
- Interactive map of Oznobishino
- Location of Oznobishino Oznobishino (Vladimir Oblast)
- Coordinates: 55°46′01″N 41°24′36″E
- Country: Russia
- Federal subject: Vladimir Oblast
- Administrative district: Selivanovsky District
- Selsoviet: Malyshevskoye rural settlement
- Founded: 14th century

Population (2010 Census)
  - Total: 19
  - Estimate (2021): 21 (+10.5%)

Municipal status
  - Municipal district: Selivanovsky Municipal District
  - Rural settlement: Malyshevskoye rural settlement
- Time zone: UTC+3 (MSK)
- Postal code: 602223
- OKTMO ID: 17648416231

Oznobíshino (Russian: Озноби́шино) is a village in Malyshevskoye rural settlement of Selivanovsky District in Vladimir Oblast, Russia.

== Geography ==
The village is located at a distance of 50 km from Krasnaya Gorbatka ("Red Upland"), which is the administrative center of Selivanovsky District. The village is situated on the plain. The river Ushna flows near the village.

== History ==
=== Oznobishino hill fort ===
Oznobishino hill fort is located at a distance of one km from the Oznobishino village, in the forest, on the high right bank of the Ushna river, at a distance of three km below than the hill fort near the selo Karpovo. Oznobishino hill fort was discovered in 1950 by a group of students of Ivanovo State Teacher Training Institute: N. Barinova, G. Ivanova, K. Katkov and Yu. Sokolov, at the time of archaeological prospecting on the Ushna river. Oznobishino hill fort was dated to from the end of the 2nd to the 5th or 6th centuries.

A later Oznobishino hill fort was dated to 7th–11th and 17th centuries.

The hill fort was located at a distance of 6 km from the old land route Moscow-Vladimir-Murom-Nizhny Novgorod-Kazan. The hill fort could serve as a haven for water transport. As a result of the shallowing of the Ushna in the 14th and 15th centuries, the hill fort lost its role of watch and servicing shipping point, and it was abandoned. The inhabitants moved to the left sloping bank, flooded by 50–100 m in each spring. The inhabitants settled on a small hill, located at a distance of 400–500 m from the shore. The main occupations of the inhabitants were hunting, fishing and cattle breeding. Initially there was a small number of households (2-5), but it gradually reached 23 to the 18th century.

=== Oznobishino sel`tso in pre-revolutionary period ===
On maps and plans of the Economic notes to the General land-surveying of the 52 gubernii of Russia (1765–1782) sel`tso Oznobishino of Sudogodsky Uyezd was denoted as a plot No. 575; there were number 23 households and 108 inhabitants (55 male and 53 female).

In the 18th century the Oznobishino sel`tso consisted of two parts. The first upper part (23 households) belonged to the nobles: to the governorate (provincial) secretary Andrian and to poruchik (lieutenant) Aleksandr Vladimirovich Gofmans. The second lower part (without buildings) belonged to the nadvorny (court) counselor M.F. Shul`gina. The co-owners of the sel`tso were 8 people: Guriy Petrov's son Dubenskiy, Grigoriy Alekseevich Dubenskiy, Ivan Ivan's son Rogovskiy, Anisya Fyodor's daughter Kravkova, Avdotya Ivan's daughter Sencherirova, Osip Sergeev Lukin, Aleksandr Fyodorov Lukin and Aleksey Boris's son Borisov.

Geographical, social and economic situation of the sel`tso described briefly: "(it) located on the left bank of the river Usna, near the nameless ravine; above a grass (there is) seigniorial (manor) wood house, ground is uliginous, cereals and haying are moderate, forest (is for) fire-wood, peasants at obrok". (the quote according to)

The manor house belonged to Gofmans. Tangle of lilac remained at this place up to now. Adjacent territories of both parts of Oznobishino were wastelands: slopings and semi-wastelands, made by the slash-and-burn agricultural system and assarts in the 14th and 15th centuries, and by the fallow agricultural system in the form of three-field crop rotation in the 18th century: fields was exhausted after 4–6 years of use and these lands left for haying or for forest natural regeneration. Five persons of a list of 39 co-owners of adjacent territories were owners of Oznobishino sel`tso. Obrok peasants of this little-inhabited village (23 households, 108 inhabitants, including about 60 children) were able to supply the needs of many (about 45) owners.

Before the October Revolution Oznobishino was a part of Sudogodsky Uyezd in Vladimir Guberniya. The population in 1859 was 188.

In 1898, there were 34 households, the number of inhabitants reached 154 people, including 90 children.

=== The Soviet period and the present ===
In 1917-1923 there was absolute maximum of inhabitants for the history of the village: 214, including 150 children (70%). The scale of living of peasants in the early 20th century, as in the 18th and 19th centuries, was mainly average or below average. There were few wealthy masters (10%).

There was overpopulation of households and increasing the number of households was impossible: from the east the extension was limited by the descent to the river, from the west and from the north – by the ravine and forest. As a result, from 1923 to 1930 there was the resettlement from the first upper part to the second part, spaced from the first at a distance of 500–700 meters. The number of households in the new place increased from 32 to 45. About 10 of the old and firm houses or of the new houses were moved from the old location to the new one. Most of the owners built houses on the new place when they still lived on the old place. The neighbors helped large families and poor families to build their houses.

In 1933 the household of Gavrila Yakovlevich Shul`gin was "dekulakizated" (dispossessed and repressed by Soviet power). The family had six children: five sons and one daughter. The villagers did not consider this family was kulaks.

The pre-war years (1937–1941) can be called the time of prosperity of the kolkhoz Oznobishino. There was dairy-farm, stables with smithy, mill on the Usna river, bee-garden, potato storage, machine and tractor station with fuel station, fuels and lubricants oils. All the households had cattle. Large village herd was until the 1980s.

During the Great Patriotic War in 1941–1945, 29 villagers fell. Natalya Mironova lost all of her family: her husband Pyotr fell in the Finnish War in 1939, her three sons (Ivan, Mikhail, Nikolay) fell in the Great Patriotic War. Three sons fell in each of the families: Nikitins and Kozlovs. During the war in one of the 4 houses of large house, where located the bureau, four-year school was opened for children born before the war. 40 children studied in the class. Teachers lived in the other half of the village. The school was until 1970.

According to the agriculture reforms by Nikita Khrushchev small "unpromising" villages everywhere interflowed in the urban-type settlement. Like the Maksimovka (12 households, 4 km to the north) the Oznobishino village had to join the sovkhoz (Soviet state farm) Shustovo-Gonobilovo. This triggered a strong wave of inhabitants protest. A.M. Kulikova (born in 1929) stated that she will not go away, even if there will be only her house in this place. All villagers unanimously supported her, and the government retreated. The village remained in the Malyshevo kolkhoz "Named for the Second Pyatiletka". In 1960 the kolkhoz became a sovkhoz. In 1960 a water tower and two water-pumps were built in the village (before water was taken from the river Ushna, there were wells).

In 1960–1980s Oznobishino population decreased, which was caused by the job hunting, the desire to provide children with an education, including higher, and by other family reasons.

In 1992 the sovkhoz was closed. Because of the remigration of descendants (children, grandchildren, great-grandchildren) of the indigenous inhabitants and because of the buying of houses by "dachniki", Oznobishino is preserved. But, as an agriculture settlement (as it was until 1991), as well as an active participant of the market post-Soviet reforms, Oznobishino ceased to exist, it became a dacha settlement.

== Demography ==
Social and demographic situation in Oznobishino was typical for the most villages in Central Russia.

According to statistics of house sales in the village since 1923, there were more than 70 transactions of purchase and sale by 40 owners. Two houses sold to Murom; three houses sold to other settlements of the Vladimir Oblast.

In 2012 there was registered 52 houses in Oznobishino, including 16 houses by local residents and 36 ones by dachniki from Moscow, Vladimir and Murom. 18 people in 6 houses registered as village residents (they lived all the year round). The number of inhabitants in summer reached 180, including 80 children.

== Culture ==
Historically the population of the village practice Orthodoxy. Patron saint's day was Spring Nikola, May 22, and Winter Nikola, December 19. Funeral rites and commemoration for the dead in Oznobishino took place in accordance with definite Canon. In the 20th century, the Oznobishino was known as the best one in music and dancing. People came from all the surrounding villages in order to dance (they walked 5–12 km).

Now there are the Memorial to the villages of Oznobishino fallen in the Great Patriotic War (honour roll), 2006, and the Museum of village things, both of them are homemade.

== Gallery ==
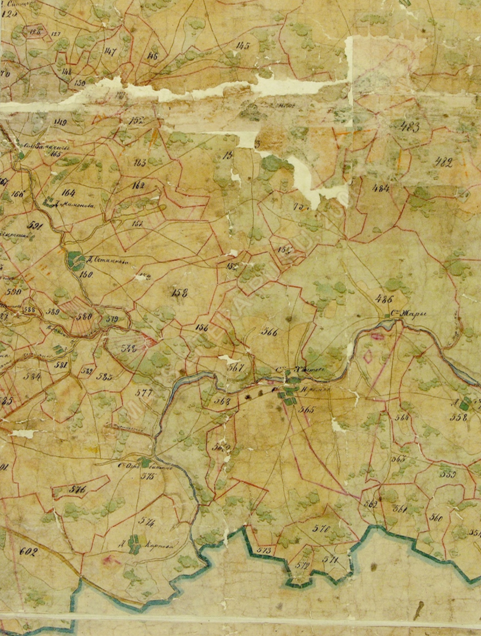
Oznobishino sel`tso, No. 575, 1776 (Economic notes to the General land-surveying of the 52 gubernii of Russia (1765–1782)

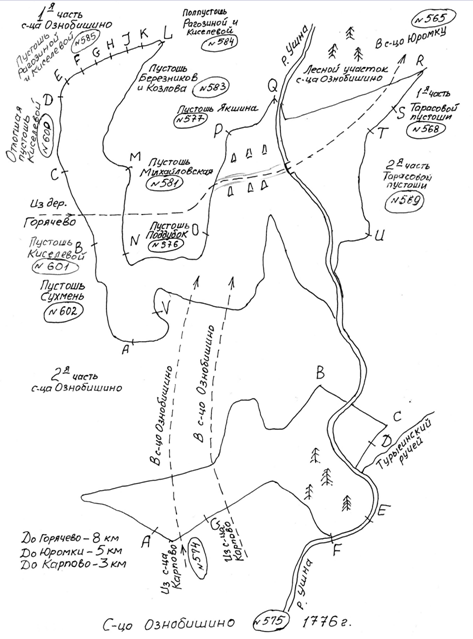
Oznobishino sel`tso No.575, 1776, relative figure (Economic notes to the General land-surveying of the 52 gubernii of Russia (1765–1782)

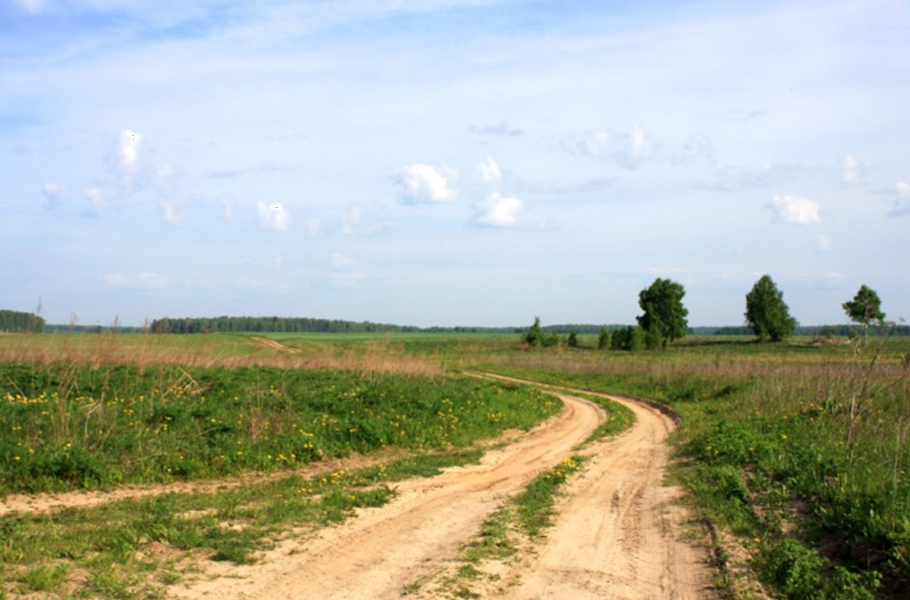
The road from Karpovo to Oznobishino
