= Dubrovo, Sobinsky District, Vladimir Oblast =

Dubrovo Дуброво
- Village
- Location within Vladimir Oblast Location within Russia
- Coordinates: 55°54′N 40°02′E
- Country: Russia
- Region: Vladimir Oblast
- District: Sobinsky District
- Time zone: UTC+3:00

Dubrovo (Russian: Дуброво) is a rural locality (a village) in Bereznikovskoye Rural Settlement, Sobinsky District, Vladimir Oblast, Russia. The population was 68 as of 2010.

== Geography ==
Dubrovo is located 14 km south of Sobinka (the district's administrative centre) by road. Shepeli is the nearest rural locality.
