= Dubrovo, Vologodsky District, Vologda Oblast =

Dubrovo Дуброво
- Village
- Location within Vologda Oblast Location within Russia
- Coordinates: 59°21′N 39°17′E
- Country: Russia
- Region: Vologda Oblast
- District: Vologodsky District
- Time zone: UTC+3:00

Dubrovo (Russian: Дуброво) is a rural locality (a village) in Kubenskoye Rural Settlement, Vologodsky District, Vologda Oblast, Russia. The population was 6 as of 2002.

== Geography ==
The distance to Vologda is 61 km, to Kubenskoye is 23 km. Kosyakovo, Odoleikha, Malonovlenskoye, Isakovo, Nizhneye, Maryino are the nearest rural localities.
