= Malyshevo, Kovrovsky District, Vladimir Oblast =

Malyshevo Малышево
- Selo
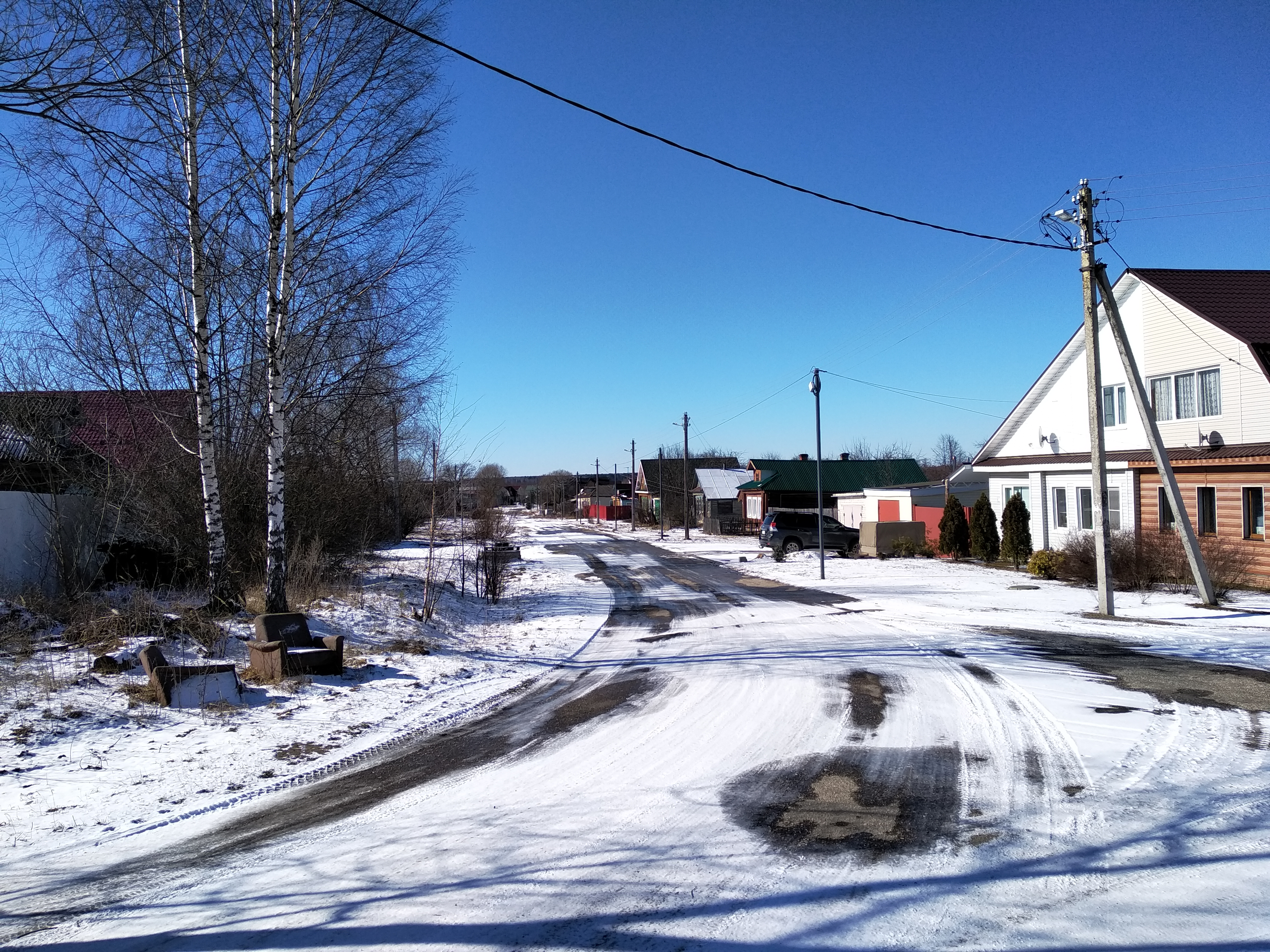
- Malyshevo

- Location within Vladimir Oblast Location within Russia
- Coordinates: 56°25′N 41°13′E
- Country: Russia
- Region: Vladimir Oblast
- District: Kovrovsky District
- Time zone: UTC+3:00

Malyshevo (Russian: Малышево) is a rural locality (a selo) in Malyginskoye Rural Settlement, Kovrovsky District, Vladimir Oblast, Russia. The population was 74 as of 2010.

== Geography ==
Malyshevo is located on the Uvod River, 11 km northwest of Kovrov (the district's administrative centre) by road. Kislyakovo is the nearest rural locality.
