= Dubrovo, Perm Krai =

Dubrovo Дуброво
- Village
- Location within Perm Krai Location within Russia
- Coordinates: 57°49′N 56°38′E
- Country: Russia
- Region: Perm Krai
- District: Permsky District
- Time zone: UTC+5:00

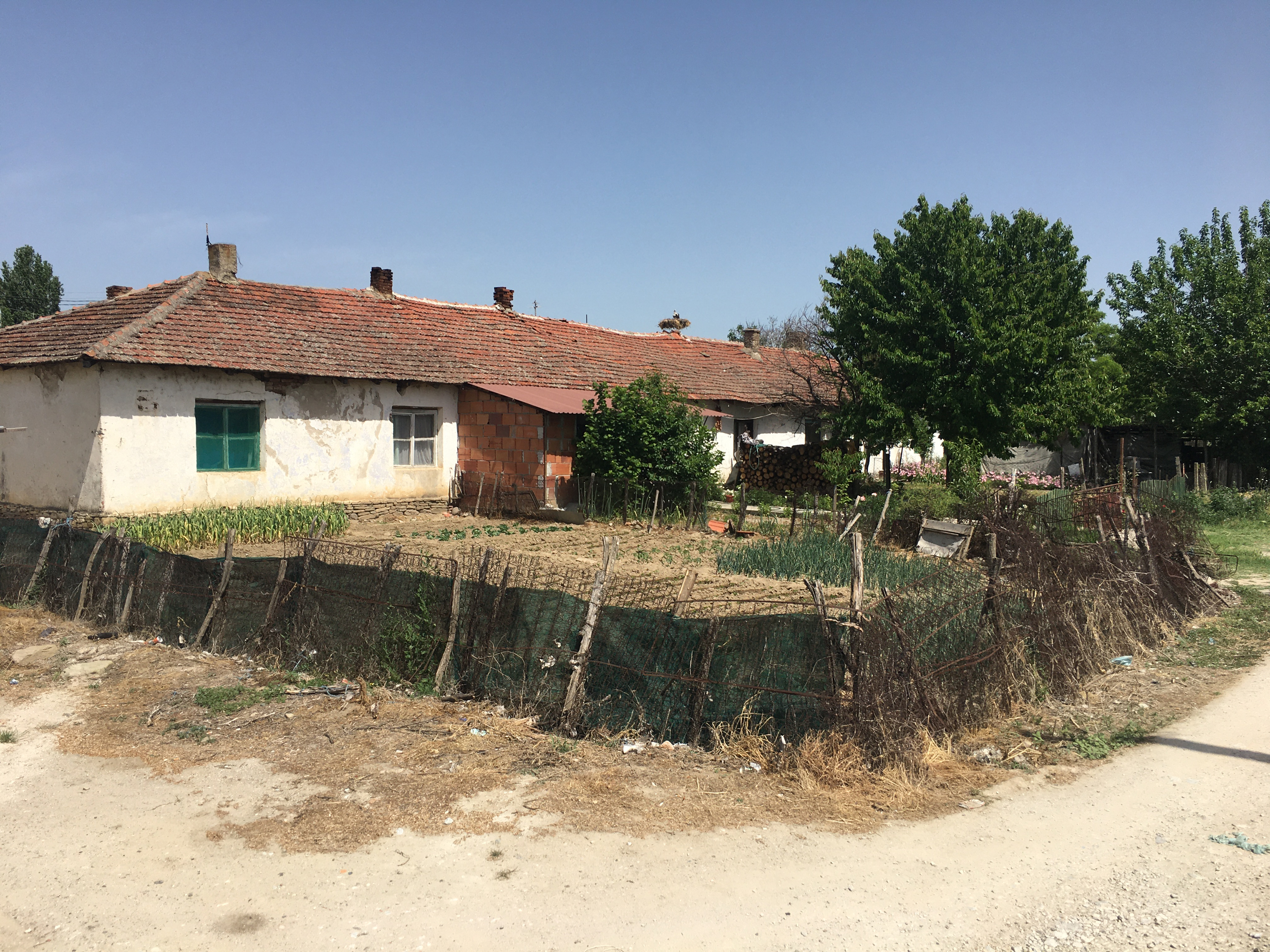

Dubrovo (Russian: Дуброво) is a rural locality (a village) in Dvurechenskoye Rural Settlement, Permsky District, Perm Krai, Russia. The population was 36 as of 2010. There are 8 streets.

== Geography ==
Dubrovo is located 42 km southeast of Perm (the district's administrative centre) by road. Gorny is the nearest rural locality.
