= Dubrovo, Gorokhovetsky District, Vladimir Oblast =

Dubrovo Дуброво
- Village
- Location within Vladimir Oblast Location within Russia
- Coordinates: 56°03′N 42°26′E
- Country: Russia
- Region: Vladimir Oblast
- District: Gorokhovetsky District
- Time zone: UTC+3:00

Dubrovo (Russian: Дуброво) is a rural locality (a village) in Denisovskoye Rural Settlement, Gorokhovetsky District, Vladimir Oblast, Russia. The population was 16 as of 2010.

== Geography ==
Dubrovo is located 26 km southwest of Gorokhovets (the district's administrative centre) by road. Vnukovo is the nearest rural locality.
