= Dubrovo, Cherepovetsky District, Vologda Oblast =

Dubrovo Дуброво
- Village
- Location within Vologda Oblast Location within Russia
- Coordinates: 59°00′N 37°32′E
- Country: Russia
- Region: Vologda Oblast
- District: Cherepovetsky District
- Time zone: UTC+3:00

Dubrovo (Russian: Дуброво) is a rural locality (a village) in Korotovskoye Rural Settlement, Cherepovetsky District, Vologda Oblast, Russia. The population was 85 as of 2002.

== Geography ==
Dubrovo is located 73 km (45 mi) southwest of Cherepovets (the district's administrative centre) by road. Fedosovo is the nearest rural locality.
