= Malyshevo, Kaduysky District, Vologda Oblast =

Malyshevo Малышево
- Village
- Location within Vologda Oblast Location within Russia
- Coordinates: 59°25′N 37°06′E
- Country: Russia
- Region: Vologda Oblast
- District: Kaduysky District
- Time zone: UTC+3:00

Malyshevo (Russian: Малышево) is a rural locality (a village) in Nikolskoye Rural Settlement, Kaduysky District, Vologda Oblast, Russia. The population was 1 as of 2002.

== Geography ==
The distance to Kaduy is 34 km, to Nikolskoye is 10 km. Kulikovo is the nearest rural locality.
