= Krasnaya Gorbatka =

Urban locality in Vladimir Oblast, Russia

Coordinates: 55°52′00″N 41°45′56″E

Krasnaya Gorbatka (Russian: Красная Горбатка) is an urban-type settlement and the administrative center of Selivanovsky District, Vladimir Oblast, Russia. Population: 7,998 (2021 census); 8,885 (2010 census); 9,441 (2002 census); 10,493 (1989 Soviet census).
