= Selivanovsky District =

Selivanovsky District Селивановский район (Russian)
- District
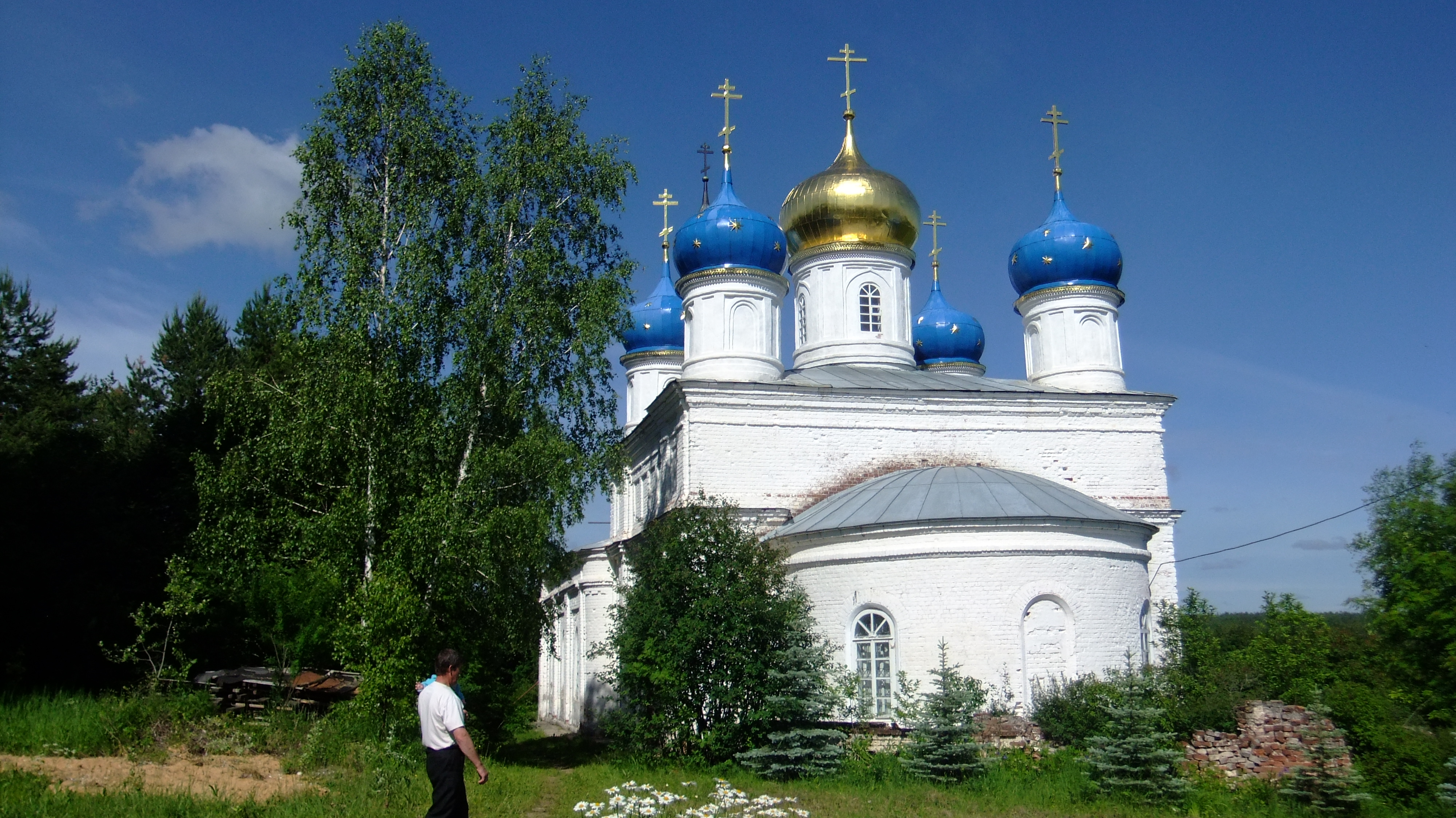
- Church of Our Lady of Vladimir, village Tuchkovo

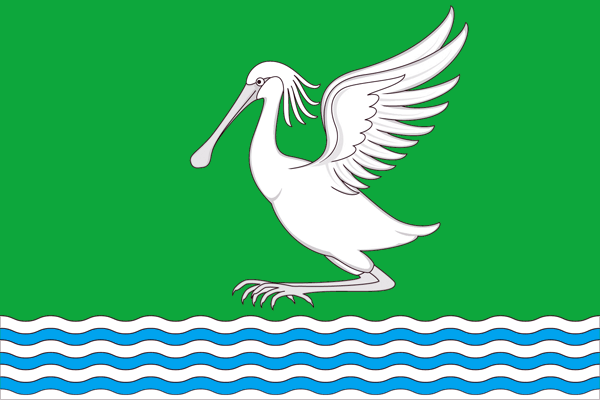
- Flag Coat of arms
- Location of Selivanovsky District in Vladimir Oblast
- Coordinates: 55°52′N 41°46′E
- Country: Russia
- Federal subject: Vladimir Oblast
- Established: 10 April 1929
- Administrative center: Krasnaya Gorbatka

Area
  - Total: 1,388 km^{2} (536 sq mi)

Population (2010 Census)
  - Total: 18,610
  - Density: 13.41/km^{2} (34.73/sq mi)
  - Urban: 47.7%
  - Rural: 52.3%

Administrative structure
  - Inhabited localities: 1 urban-type settlements, 89 rural localities

Municipal structure
  - Municipally incorporated as: Selivanovsky Municipal District
  - Municipal divisions: 1 urban settlements, 4 rural settlements
- Time zone: UTC+3 (MSK)
- OKTMO ID: 17648000
- Website: http://www.selivanovo.ru/

Selivanovsky District (Russian: Селива́новский райо́н) is an administrative and municipal district (raion), one of the sixteen in Vladimir Oblast, Russia. It is located in the east of the oblast. The area of the district is 1,388 square kilometers (536 sq mi). Its administrative center is the urban locality (a settlement) of Krasnaya Gorbatka. Population: 17,201 (2021 census); 18,610 (2010 census); 21,330 (2002 Census); 24,767 (1989 Soviet census). The population of Krasnaya Gorbatka accounts for 46.5% of the district's total population.
