= Bolymotikha =

Bolymotikha Болымотиха
- Village
- Location within Vladimir Oblast Location within Russia
- Coordinates: 56°13′N 42°08′E
- Country: Russia
- Region: Vladimir Oblast
- District: Vyaznikovsky District
- Time zone: UTC+3:00

Bolymotikha (Russian: Болымотиха) is a rural locality (a village) in Paustovskoye Rural Settlement, Vyaznikovsky District, Vladimir Oblast, Russia. The population was 81 as of 2010.

== Geography ==
Bolymotikha is located 7 km south of Vyazniki (the district's administrative centre) by road. Vyazniki is the nearest rural locality.
