= Serkovo =

Serkovo Серково
- Village
- Location within Vladimir Oblast Location within Russia
- Coordinates: 56°11′N 41°56′E
- Country: Russia
- Region: Vladimir Oblast
- District: Vyaznikovsky District
- Time zone: UTC+3:00

Serkovo (Russian: Серково) is a rural locality (a village) in Oktyabrskoye Rural Settlement, Vyaznikovsky District, Vladimir Oblast, Russia. The population was 892 as of 2010.

== Geography ==
The village is located 1 km from Pivovarovo, 20 km south-west from Vyazniki, 10 km from Senkovo.
