= Kostroma constituency =

Constituency of the State Duma of the Russian Federation

Kostroma single-member constituency
- Constituency of the Russian State Duma

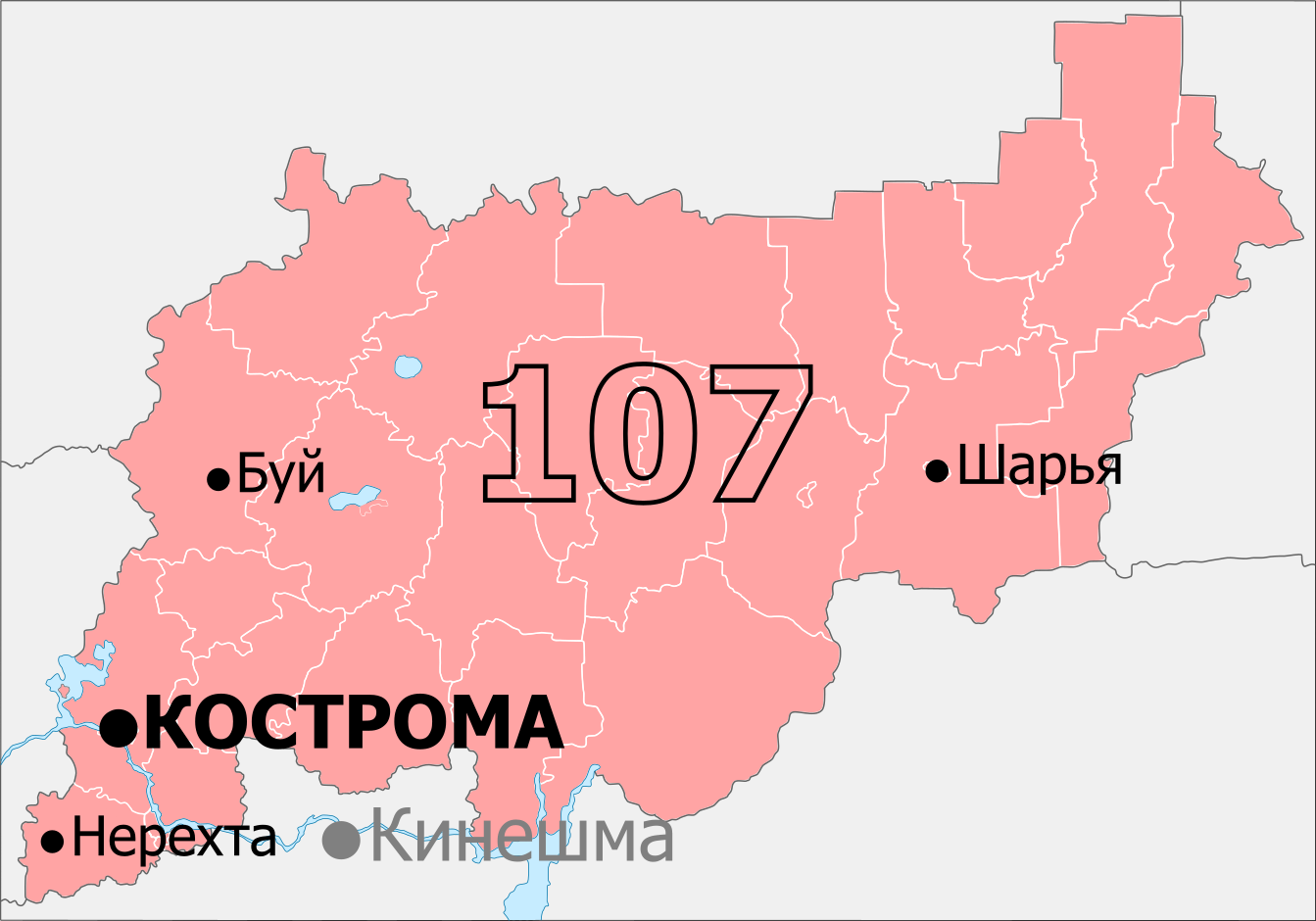
- Deputy: Aleksey Anokhin; United Russia
- Federal subject: Kostroma Oblast
- Districts: Antropovsky, Buy, Buysky, Chukhlomsky, Galich, Galichsky, Kadyysky, Kologrivsky, Kostroma, Kostromskoy, Krasnoselsky, Makaryevsky, Manturovo, Manturovsky, Mezhevskoy, Nerekhta, Nerekhtsky, Neya, Neysky, Oktyabrsky, Ostrovsky, Parfenyevsky, Pavinsky, Ponazyrevsky, Pyshchugsky, Sharya, Sharyinsky, Soligalichsky, Sudislavsky, Susaninsky, Vokhomsky, Volgorechensk
- Voters: 491,307 (2026)

The Kostroma constituency (No.108 (Note: No.95 in 1993-1995 and 2003-2007, No.94 in 1995-2003, No.107 in 2016–2026)) is a Russian legislative constituency in Kostroma Oblast. The constituency encompasses the entire territory of Kostroma Oblast.

The constituency has been represented since 2026 by United Russia deputy Aleksey Anokhin, former Chairman of the Kostroma Oblast Duma and First Deputy Governor of Kostroma Oblast, who won the open-seat after three-term United Russia incumbent Aleksey Sitnikov ran for Duma of Kostromskoy District.

== Boundaries ==
1993–2007, 2016–present: Antropovsky District, Buy, Buysky District, Chukhlomsky District, Galich, Galichsky District, Kadyysky District, Kologrivsky District, Kostroma, Kostromskoy District, Krasnoselsky District, Makaryevsky District, Manturovo, Manturovsky District, Mezhevskoy District, Nerekhta, Nerekhtsky District, Neya, Neysky District, Oktyabrsky District, Ostrovsky District, Parfenyevsky District, Pavinsky District, Ponazyrevsky District, Pyshchugsky District, Sharya, Sharyinsky District, Soligalichsky District, Sudislavsky District, Susaninsky District, Vokhomsky District, Volgorechensk
The constituency has been covering the entirety of Kostroma Oblast since its initial creation in 1993.

== Members elected ==
Election	Member	Party
1993	Adrian Puzanovsky	Dignity and Charity
1995	Adrian Puzanovsky	Agrarian Party
1999	Adrian Puzanovsky	Independent
2003	Yevgeny Trepov	United Russia
2007	Proportional representation - no election by constituency	
2011	Proportional representation - no election by constituency	
2016	Aleksey Sitnikov	United Russia
2021	Aleksey Sitnikov	United Russia
2026	Aleksey Anokhin	United Russia

== Election results ==
=== 1993 ===
Summary of the 12 December 1993 Russian legislative election in the Kostroma constituency
Candidate	Party	Votes	%
Adrian Puzanovsky	Dignity and Charity	117,135	33.01%
Aleksandr Voronin	Independent	–	18.32%
Viktor Gulyashko	Independent	–	–
Nikolay Isayev	Choice of Russia	–	–
Sergey Mormin	Liberal Democratic Party	–	–
Total		354,879	100%

=== 1995 ===
Summary of the 17 December 1995 Russian legislative election in the Kostroma constituency
Candidate	Party	Votes	%
Adrian Puzanovsky (incumbent)	Agrarian Party	109,363	26.95%
Anatoly Sidorov	Liberal Democratic Party	37,574	9.26%
Viktor Gulyashko	Trade Unions and Industrialists – Union of Labour	28,162	6.94%
Igor Smirnov	Independent	27,649	6.81%
Valentin Mamontov	Our Home – Russia	25,902	6.38%
Galina Zaikina	Independent	24,649	6.07%
Vladimir Voronin	Russian Union of Local Self-Government	21,427	5.28%
Andrey Lutchenkov	Independent	19,096	4.71%
Yury Timoshenko	Independent	17,345	4.27%
Alvin Yeryomin	Power to the People!	14,692	3.62%
Aleksandr Kulkov	Independent	8,514	2.10%
Aleksandr Gotovtsev	Party of Economic Freedom	8,386	2.07%
Aleksandr Sutyagin	Political Movement of Transport Workers	6,507	1.60%
Valery Vdovichev	Independent	5,424	1.34%
against all		40,757	10.04%
Total		405,753	100%

=== 1999 ===
Summary of the 19 December 1999 Russian legislative election in the Kostroma constituency
Candidate	Party	Votes	%
Adrian Puzanovsky (incumbent)	Independent	70,561	18.07%
Andrey Bychkov	Fatherland – All Russia	62,493	16.01%
Irina Pereverzeva	Independent	56,246	14.41%
Valentina Yamshchikova	Yabloko	48,003	12.29%
Pavel Romanets	Independent	32,074	8.21%
Andrey Lutchenkov	Independent	31,808	8.15%
Anatoly Mishanov	Independent	27,357	7.01%
Yevgeny Onegin	Kedr	10,232	2.62%
against all		45,643	11.69%
Total		390,444	100%

=== 2003 ===
Summary of the 7 December 2003 Russian legislative election in the Kostroma constituency
Candidate	Party	Votes	%
Yevgeny Trepov	United Russia	94,899	28.35%
Sergey Komissarov	Independent	69,969	20.90%
Vladimir Mikhaylov	People's Party	37,316	11.15%
Mikhail Vasin	Independent	33,624	10.05%
Sard Sardarov	Independent	18,294	5.47%
Marina Gordeyeva	Party of Russia's Rebirth-Russian Party of Life	17,094	5.11%
Aleksandr Chuyev	Rodina	13,013	3.89%
Mikhail Karlashov	Liberal Democratic Party	6,615	1.98%
Leonid Storozhev	Yabloko	5,467	1.63%
Anatoly Zaytsev	United Russian Party Rus'	2,113	0.63%
against all		31,475	9.40%
Total		335,092	100%

=== 2016 ===
Summary of the 18 September 2016 Russian legislative election in the Kostroma constituency
Candidate	Party	Votes	%
Aleksey Sitnikov	United Russia	80,762	38.12%
Valery Izhitsky	Communist Party	51,746	24.43%
Ruslan Fedorov	Liberal Democratic Party	20,877	9.85%
Aleksandr Plyusnin	A Just Russia	16,483	7.78%
Yevgeny Trepov	Rodina	13,702	6.47%
Vladimir Mikhaylov	Yabloko	12,139	5.73%
Vladimir Sabelnikov	Communists of Russia	3,868	1.83%
Aleksey Postnikov	Party of Growth	3,466	1.64%
Aleksandr Bakanov	The Greens	2,822	1.33%
Total		211,849	100%

=== 2021 ===
Summary of the 17-19 September 2021 Russian legislative election in the Kostroma constituency
Candidate	Party	Votes	%
Aleksey Sitnikov (incumbent)	United Russia	74,497	36.91%
Valery Izhitsky	Communist Party	58,623	29.04%
Vyacheslav Golovnikov	A Just Russia — For Truth	19,422	9.62%
Dmitry Fedin	New People	10,533	5.22%
Andrey Kuznetsov	Party of Pensioners	10,334	5.12%
Ruslan Fedorov	Liberal Democratic Party	10,125	5.02%
Aleksandr Lazutin	Yabloko	3,957	1.96%
Vladimir Salnikov	Rodina	2,850	1.41%
Valery Kirsanov	Civic Platform	2,553	1.26%
Andrey Shishov	Party of Growth	2,003	0.99%
Total		201,838	100%

=== 2026 ===
Summary of the 18-20 September 2026 Russian legislative election in the Kostroma constituency
Candidate	Party	Votes	%
Aleksey Anokhin	United Russia	115,067	50.16%
Valery Izhitsky	Communist Party	40,827	17.80%
Andrey Tarasov	Yabloko	16,536	7.21%
Yury Mindolin	Liberal Democratic Party	16,257	7.09%
Pavel Zayfidi	New People	15,930	6.94%
Yury Kudryavtsev	Party of Pensioners	10,715	4.67%
Anatoly Buy	A Just Russia	9,673	4.22%
Total		229,422	100%
