= Pochinok (inhabited locality) =

Pochinok (Russian: Починок) is the name of several inhabited localities in Russia.

== Modern localities ==
=== Arkhangelsk Oblast ===
As of 2012, one rural locality in Arkhangelsk Oblast bears this name:

- Pochinok, Arkhangelsk Oblast, a village in Zabelinsky Selsoviet of Kotlassky District

=== Bryansk Oblast ===
As of 2012, one rural locality in Bryansk Oblast bears this name:

- Pochinok, Bryansk Oblast, a village in Titovsky Rural Administrative Okrug of Pochepsky District; 52°50′N 33°19′E

=== Ivanovo Oblast ===
As of 2012, four rural localities in Ivanovo Oblast bear this name:

- Pochinok, Kineshemsky District, Ivanovo Oblast, a village in Kineshemsky District
- Pochinok, Palekhsky District, Ivanovo Oblast, a village in Palekhsky District
- Pochinok, Vichugsky District, Ivanovo Oblast, a village in Vichugsky District
- Pochinok, Zavolzhsky District, Ivanovo Oblast, a village in Zavolzhsky District

=== Kaluga Oblast ===
As of 2012, one rural locality in Kaluga Oblast bears this name:

- Pochinok, Kaluga Oblast, a village in Kuybyshevsky District

=== Kirov Oblast ===
As of 2012, one rural locality in Kirov Oblast bears this name:

- Pochinok, Kirov Oblast, a village in Kalachigovsky Rural Okrug of Verkhoshizhemsky District; 58°4′N 49°36′E

=== Kostroma Oblast ===
As of 2012, thirteen rural localities in Kostroma Oblast bear this name:

- Pochinok, Antropovsky District, Kostroma Oblast, a village in Palkinskoye Settlement of Antropovsky District; 58°12′N 42°42′E
- Pochinok, Galichsky District, Kostroma Oblast, a village in Dmitriyevskoye Settlement of Galichsky District; 58°22′N 42°15′E
- Pochinok, Chernyshevskoye Settlement, Kadyysky District, Kostroma Oblast, a village in Chernyshevskoye Settlement of Kadyysky District
- Pochinok, Yekaterinkinskoye Settlement, Kadyysky District, Kostroma Oblast, a village in Yekaterinkinskoye Settlement of Kadyysky District
- Pochinok, Kologrivsky District, Kostroma Oblast, a village in Sukhoverkhovskoye Settlement of Kologrivsky District; 58°47′N 44°18′E
- Pochinok, Makaryevsky District, Kostroma Oblast, a village in Ust-Neyskoye Settlement of Makaryevsky District; 57°59′N 43°38′E
- Pochinok, Manturovsky District, Kostroma Oblast, a village in Podvigalikhinskoye Settlement of Manturovsky District; 58°33′N 44°38′E
- Pochinok, Mikhalevskoye Settlement, Neysky District, Kostroma Oblast, a village in Mikhalevskoye Settlement of Neysky District
- Pochinok, Soltanovskoye Settlement, Neysky District, Kostroma Oblast, a village in Soltanovskoye Settlement of Neysky District
- Pochinok, Ostrovsky District, Kostroma Oblast, a village in Alexandrovskoye Settlement of Ostrovsky District; 57°41′N 42°23′E
- Pochinok, Sharyinsky District, Kostroma Oblast, a village in Zabolotskoye Settlement of Sharyinsky District; 58°17′N 45°49′E
- Pochinok, Soligalichsky District, Kostroma Oblast, a village in Soligalichskoye Settlement of Soligalichsky District; 59°4′N 42°21′E
- Pochinok, Susaninsky District, Kostroma Oblast, a village in Severnoye Settlement of Susaninsky District; 58°2′N 41°26′E

=== Leningrad Oblast ===
As of 2012, one rural locality in Leningrad Oblast bears this name:

- Pochinok, Leningrad Oblast, a settlement in Larionovskoye Settlement Municipal Formation of Priozersky District; 60°58′N 30°11′E

=== Mari El Republic ===
As of 2012, one rural locality in the Mari El Republic bears this name:

- Pochinok, Mari El Republic, a village in Gornoshumetsky Rural Okrug of Yurinsky District; 56°17′N 46°7′E

=== Nizhny Novgorod Oblast ===
As of 2012, four rural localities in Nizhny Novgorod Oblast bear this name:

- Pochinok, Chkalovsky District, Nizhny Novgorod Oblast, a village in Solomatovsky Selsoviet of Chkalovsky District; 56°44′N 42°53′E
- Pochinok, Chernyshikhinsky Selsoviet, Kstovsky District, Nizhny Novgorod Oblast, a village in Chernyshikhinsky Selsoviet of Kstovsky District; 55°57′N 44°43′E
- Pochinok, Novolikeyevsky Selsoviet, Kstovsky District, Nizhny Novgorod Oblast, a village in Novolikeyevsky Selsoviet of Kstovsky District; 56°5′N 44°19′E
- Pochinok, Sokolsky District, Nizhny Novgorod Oblast, a village in Volzhsky Selsoviet of Sokolsky District; 57°16′N 43°22′E

=== Novgorod Oblast ===
As of 2012, one rural locality in Novgorod Oblast bears this name:

- Pochinok, Novgorod Oblast, a village in Yamnikskoye Settlement of Demyansky District

=== Smolensk Oblast ===
As of 2012, eight inhabited localities in Smolensk Oblast bear this name:

Urban localities

- Pochinok, Pochinkovsky District, Smolensk Oblast, a town under the administrative jurisdiction of Pochinkovskoye Urban Settlement in Pochinkovsky District

Rural localities

- Pochinok, Dorogobuzhsky District, Smolensk Oblast, a village in Aleksinskoye Rural Settlement of Dorogobuzhsky District
- Pochinok, Beresnevskoye Rural Settlement, Dukhovshchinsky District, Smolensk Oblast, a village in Beresnevskoye Rural Settlement of Dukhovshchinsky District
- Pochinok, Beresnevskoye Rural Settlement, Dukhovshchinsky District, Smolensk Oblast, a village in Beresnevskoye Rural Settlement of Dukhovshchinsky District
- Pochinok, Dobrinskoye Rural Settlement, Dukhovshchinsky District, Smolensk Oblast, a village in Dobrinskoye Rural Settlement of Dukhovshchinsky District
- Pochinok, Tretyakovskoye Rural Settlement, Dukhovshchinsky District, Smolensk Oblast, a village in Tretyakovskoye Rural Settlement of Dukhovshchinsky District
- Pochinok, Kardymovsky District, Smolensk Oblast, a village in Netrizovskoye Rural Settlement of Kardymovsky District
- Pochinok, Rudnyansky District, Smolensk Oblast, a village in Ponizovskoye Rural Settlement of Rudnyansky District

=== Sverdlovsk Oblast ===
As of 2012, one rural locality in Sverdlovsk Oblast bears this name:

- Pochinok, Sverdlovsk Oblast, a village in Taraskovsky Selsoviet under the administrative jurisdiction of the closed administrative-territorial formation of Novouralsk

=== Tver Oblast ===
As of 2012, eleven rural localities in Tver Oblast bear this name:

- Pochinok, Filippkovskoye Rural Settlement, Bezhetsky District, Tver Oblast, a village in Filippkovskoye Rural Settlement of Bezhetsky District
- Pochinok, Zhitishchenskoye Rural Settlement, Bezhetsky District, Tver Oblast, a village in Zhitishchenskoye Rural Settlement of Bezhetsky District
- Pochinok, Firovsky District, Tver Oblast, a village in Velikooktyabrskoye Rural Settlement of Firovsky District
- Pochinok, Krasnokholmsky District, Tver Oblast, a village in Barbinskoye Rural Settlement of Krasnokholmsky District
- Pochinok, Maksatikhinsky District, Tver Oblast, a village in Malyshevskoye Rural Settlement of Maksatikhinsky District
- Pochinok, Penovsky District, Tver Oblast, a village in Zayevskoye Rural Settlement of Penovsky District
- Pochinok, Selizharovsky District, Tver Oblast, a village in Selishchenskoye Rural Settlement of Selizharovsky District
- Pochinok, Knyashchinskoye Rural Settlement, Vyshnevolotsky District, Tver Oblast, a village in Knyashchinskoye Rural Settlement of Vyshnevolotsky District
- Pochinok, Ovsishchenskoye Rural Settlement, Vyshnevolotsky District, Tver Oblast, a village in Ovsishchenskoye Rural Settlement of Vyshnevolotsky District
- Pochinok, Sorokinskoye Rural Settlement, Vyshnevolotsky District, Tver Oblast, a village in Sorokinskoye Rural Settlement of Vyshnevolotsky District
- Pochinok, Zapadnodvinsky District, Tver Oblast, a village in Ilyinskoye Rural Settlement of Zapadnodvinsky District

=== Vologda Oblast ===
As of 2012, thirty rural localities in Vologda Oblast bear this name:

- Pochinok, Fetininsky Selsoviet, Babushkinsky District, Vologda Oblast, a village in Fetininsky Selsoviet of Babushkinsky District
- Pochinok, Kosikovsky Selsoviet, Babushkinsky District, Vologda Oblast, a village in Kosikovsky Selsoviet of Babushkinsky District
- Pochinok, Domozerovsky Selsoviet, Cherepovetsky District, Vologda Oblast, a village in Domozerovsky Selsoviet of Cherepovetsky District
- Pochinok, Korotovsky Selsoviet, Cherepovetsky District, Vologda Oblast, a village in Korotovsky Selsoviet of Cherepovetsky District
- Pochinok, Yaganovsky Selsoviet, Cherepovetsky District, Vologda Oblast, a village in Yaganovsky Selsoviet of Cherepovetsky District
- Pochinok, Anokhinsky Selsoviet, Gryazovetsky District, Vologda Oblast, a village in Anokhinsky Selsoviet of Gryazovetsky District
- Pochinok, Frolovsky Selsoviet, Gryazovetsky District, Vologda Oblast, a village in Frolovsky Selsoviet of Gryazovetsky District
- Pochinok, Ploskovsky Selsoviet, Gryazovetsky District, Vologda Oblast, a village in Ploskovsky Selsoviet of Gryazovetsky District
- Pochinok, Ploskovsky Selsoviet, Gryazovetsky District, Vologda Oblast, a village in Ploskovsky Selsoviet of Gryazovetsky District
- Pochinok, Yurovsky Selsoviet, Gryazovetsky District, Vologda Oblast, a village in Yurovsky Selsoviet of Gryazovetsky District
- Pochinok, Kaduysky District, Vologda Oblast, a village in Velikoselsky Selsoviet of Kaduysky District
- Pochinok, Ilyinsky Selsoviet, Kharovsky District, Vologda Oblast, a village in Ilyinsky Selsoviet of Kharovsky District
- Pochinok, Kharovsky Selsoviet, Kharovsky District, Vologda Oblast, a village in Kharovsky Selsoviet of Kharovsky District
- Pochinok, Kubinsky Selsoviet, Kharovsky District, Vologda Oblast, a village in Kubinsky Selsoviet of Kharovsky District
- Pochinok, Kirillovsky District, Vologda Oblast, a village in Kolkachsky Selsoviet of Kirillovsky District
- Pochinok, Staroselsky Selsoviet, Mezhdurechensky District, Vologda Oblast, a village in Staroselsky Selsoviet of Mezhdurechensky District
- Pochinok, Sukhonsky Selsoviet, Mezhdurechensky District, Vologda Oblast, a village in Sukhonsky Selsoviet of Mezhdurechensky District
- Pochinok, Sizemsky Selsoviet, Sheksninsky District, Vologda Oblast, a village in Sizemsky Selsoviet of Sheksninsky District
- Pochinok, Yeremeyevsky Selsoviet, Sheksninsky District, Vologda Oblast, a village in Yeremeyevsky Selsoviet of Sheksninsky District
- Pochinok, Zheleznodorozhny Selsoviet, Sheksninsky District, Vologda Oblast, a village in Zheleznodorozhny Selsoviet of Sheksninsky District
- Pochinok, Borovetsky Selsoviet, Sokolsky District, Vologda Oblast, a village in Borovetsky Selsoviet of Sokolsky District
- Pochinok, Kokoshilovsky Selsoviet, Sokolsky District, Vologda Oblast, a village in Kokoshilovsky Selsoviet of Sokolsky District
- Pochinok, Bogorodsky Selsoviet, Ust-Kubinsky District, Vologda Oblast, a village in Bogorodsky Selsoviet of Ust-Kubinsky District
- Pochinok, Tomashsky Selsoviet, Ust-Kubinsky District, Vologda Oblast, a village in Tomashsky Selsoviet of Ust-Kubinsky District
- Pochinok, Kipelovsky Selsoviet, Vologodsky District, Vologda Oblast, a village in Kipelovsky Selsoviet of Vologodsky District
- Pochinok, Leskovsky Selsoviet, Vologodsky District, Vologda Oblast, a village in Leskovsky Selsoviet of Vologodsky District
- Pochinok, Raboche-Krestyansky Selsoviet, Vologodsky District, Vologda Oblast, a village in Raboche-Krestyansky Selsoviet of Vologodsky District
- Pochinok, Spassky Selsoviet, Vologodsky District, Vologda Oblast, a village in Spassky Selsoviet of Vologodsky District
- Pochinok, Staroselsky Selsoviet, Vologodsky District, Vologda Oblast, a village in Staroselsky Selsoviet of Vologodsky District
- Pochinok, Veprevsky Selsoviet, Vologodsky District, Vologda Oblast, a village in Veprevsky Selsoviet of Vologodsky District

=== Yaroslavl Oblast ===
As of 2012, twenty-six rural localities in Yaroslavl Oblast bear this name:

- Pochinok, Babayevsky Rural Okrug, Danilovsky District, Yaroslavl Oblast, a village in Babayevsky Rural Okrug of Danilovsky District
- Pochinok, Semlovsky Rural Okrug, Danilovsky District, Yaroslavl Oblast, a village in Semlovsky Rural Okrug of Danilovsky District
- Pochinok, Seredskoy Rural Okrug, Danilovsky District, Yaroslavl Oblast, a village in Seredskoy Rural Okrug of Danilovsky District
- Pochinok, Trofimovsky Rural Okrug, Danilovsky District, Yaroslavl Oblast, a village in Trofimovsky Rural Okrug of Danilovsky District
- Pochinok, Osetsky Rural Okrug, Lyubimsky District, Yaroslavl Oblast, a village in Osetsky Rural Okrug of Lyubimsky District
- Pochinok, Voskresensky Rural Okrug, Lyubimsky District, Yaroslavl Oblast, a village in Voskresensky Rural Okrug of Lyubimsky District
- Pochinok, Yermakovsky Rural Okrug, Lyubimsky District, Yaroslavl Oblast, a village in Yermakovsky Rural Okrug of Lyubimsky District
- Pochinok, Kryukovsky Rural Okrug, Myshkinsky District, Yaroslavl Oblast, a village in Kryukovsky Rural Okrug of Myshkinsky District
- Pochinok, Zarubinsky Rural Okrug, Myshkinsky District, Yaroslavl Oblast, a village in Zarubinsky Rural Okrug of Myshkinsky District
- Pochinok, Kukoboysky Rural Okrug, Pervomaysky District, Yaroslavl Oblast, a village in Kukoboysky Rural Okrug of Pervomaysky District
- Pochinok, Nikologorsky Rural Okrug, Pervomaysky District, Yaroslavl Oblast, a village in Nikologorsky Rural Okrug of Pervomaysky District
- Pochinok, Kladovsky Rural Okrug, Poshekhonsky District, Yaroslavl Oblast, a village in Kladovsky Rural Okrug of Poshekhonsky District
- Pochinok, Priukhrinsky Rural Okrug, Poshekhonsky District, Yaroslavl Oblast, a village in Priukhrinsky Rural Okrug of Poshekhonsky District
- Pochinok, Yudinsky Rural Okrug, Poshekhonsky District, Yaroslavl Oblast, a village in Yudinsky Rural Okrug of Poshekhonsky District
- Pochinok, Arefinsky Rural Okrug, Rybinsky District, Yaroslavl Oblast, a village in Arefinsky Rural Okrug of Rybinsky District
- Pochinok, Glebovsky Rural Okrug, Rybinsky District, Yaroslavl Oblast, a village in Glebovsky Rural Okrug of Rybinsky District
- Pochinok, Glebovsky Rural Okrug, Rybinsky District, Yaroslavl Oblast, a village in Glebovsky Rural Okrug of Rybinsky District
- Pochinok, Kamennikovsky Rural Okrug, Rybinsky District, Yaroslavl Oblast, a village in Kamennikovsky Rural Okrug of Rybinsky District
- Pochinok, Makarovsky Rural Okrug, Rybinsky District, Yaroslavl Oblast, a village in Makarovsky Rural Okrug of Rybinsky District
- Pochinok, Mikhaylovsky Rural Okrug, Rybinsky District, Yaroslavl Oblast, a village in Mikhaylovsky Rural Okrug of Rybinsky District
- Pochinok, Pogorelsky Rural Okrug, Rybinsky District, Yaroslavl Oblast, a village in Pogorelsky Rural Okrug of Rybinsky District
- Pochinok, Shashkovsky Rural Okrug, Rybinsky District, Yaroslavl Oblast, a village in Shashkovsky Rural Okrug of Rybinsky District
- Pochinok, Metenininsky Rural Okrug, Tutayevsky District, Yaroslavl Oblast, a village in Metenininsky Rural Okrug of Tutayevsky District
- Pochinok, Nikolsky Rural Okrug, Tutayevsky District, Yaroslavl Oblast, a village in Nikolsky Rural Okrug of Tutayevsky District
- Pochinok, Velikoselsky Rural Okrug, Tutayevsky District, Yaroslavl Oblast, a village in Velikoselsky Rural Okrug of Tutayevsky District
- Pochinok, Yaroslavsky District, Yaroslavl Oblast, a village in Tolbukhinsky Rural Okrug of Yaroslavsky District

== Renamed localities ==
- Pochinok, name of Konyginsky Pochinok, a village in Tsentralnoye Settlement of Buysky District in Kostroma Oblast, before December 2009; 58°37′N 41°50′E
- Pochinok, name of Kurilovsky Pochinok, a village in Tsentralnoye Settlement of Buysky District in Kostroma Oblast, before December 2009; 58°45′N 41°21′E
- Pochinok, name of Kaplinsky Pochinok, a village in Tsentralnoye Settlement of Buysky District in Kostroma Oblast, before December 2009; 58°16′N 41°1′E
- Pochinok, name of Borovsky Pochinok, a village in Tsentralnoye Settlement of Buysky District in Kostroma Oblast, before December 2009; 58°19′N 41°44′E

== Alternative names ==
- Pochinok, alternative name of Bolshoy Pochinok, a village in Kortsovskoye Settlement of Soligalichsky District in Kostroma Oblast; 58°55′N 42°13′E
- Pochinok, alternative name of Sokolovsky Pochinok, a village in Bolsherogachevskoye Rural Settlement of Dmitrovsky District in Moscow Oblast; 56°29′N 37°2′E
- Pochinok, alternative name of Pochinki, a village in Skorobogatovsky Selsoviet of Koverninsky District in Nizhny Novgorod Oblast; 56°54′N 43°49′E
