= Pustoshka =

Pustoshka (Russian: Пустошка) is the name of several inhabited localities in Russia.

== Arkhangelsk Oblast ==
As of 2010, one rural locality in Arkhangelsk Oblast bears this name:

- Pustoshka, Arkhangelsk Oblast, a village in Koydokursky Selsoviet of Kholmogorsky District

== Kostroma Oblast ==
As of 2010, four rural localities in Kostroma Oblast bear this name:

- Pustoshka, Kostromskoy District, Kostroma Oblast, a village in Shungenskoye Settlement of Kostromskoy District
- Pustoshka, Neysky District, Kostroma Oblast, a village in Soltanovskoye Settlement of Neysky District
- Pustoshka, Sharyinsky District, Kostroma Oblast, a village in Ivanovskoye Settlement of Sharyinsky District
- Pustoshka, Vokhomsky District, Kostroma Oblast, a village in Belkovskoye Settlement of Vokhomsky District

== Leningrad Oblast ==
As of 2010, two rural localities in Leningrad Oblast bear this name:

- Pustoshka, Gatchinsky District, Leningrad Oblast, a village in Novosvetskoye Settlement Municipal Formation of Gatchinsky District
- Pustoshka, Luzhsky District, Leningrad Oblast, a village in Serebryanskoye Settlement Municipal Formation of Luzhsky District

== Nizhny Novgorod Oblast ==
As of 2010, one rural locality in Nizhny Novgorod Oblast bears this name:

- Pustoshka, Nizhny Novgorod Oblast, a village in Novodmitriyevsky Selsoviet of the town of oblast significance of Vyksa

== Novgorod Oblast ==
As of 2010, seven rural localities in Novgorod Oblast bear this name:

- Pustoshka, Ilyinogorskoye Settlement, Demyansky District, Novgorod Oblast, a village in Ilyinogorskoye Settlement of Demyansky District
- Pustoshka, Polnovskoye Settlement, Demyansky District, Novgorod Oblast, a village in Polnovskoye Settlement of Demyansky District
- Pustoshka, Kholmsky District, Novgorod Oblast, a village in Morkhovskoye Settlement of Kholmsky District
- Pustoshka, Pestovsky District, Novgorod Oblast, a village in Bogoslovskoye Settlement of Pestovsky District
- Pustoshka, Poddorsky District, Novgorod Oblast, a village in Poddorskoye Settlement of Poddorsky District
- Pustoshka, Velikoselskoye Settlement, Starorussky District, Novgorod Oblast, a village in Velikoselskoye Settlement of Starorussky District
- Pustoshka, Zaluchskoye Settlement, Starorussky District, Novgorod Oblast, a village in Zaluchskoye Settlement of Starorussky District

== Pskov Oblast ==
As of 2010, nine inhabited localities in Pskov Oblast bear this name.

Urban localities

- Pustoshka, Pustoshkinsky District, Pskov Oblast, a town in Pustoshkinsky District

Rural localities

- Pustoshka, Bezhanitsky District, Pskov Oblast, a village in Bezhanitsky District
- Pustoshka (Sosonskaya Rural Settlement), Dedovichsky District, Pskov Oblast, a village in Dedovichsky District; municipally, a part of Sosonskaya Rural Settlement of that district
- Pustoshka (Pozherevitskaya Rural Settlement), Dedovichsky District, Pskov Oblast, a village in Dedovichsky District; municipally, a part of Pozherevitskaya Rural Settlement of that district
- Pustoshka, Novorzhevsky District, Pskov Oblast, a village in Novorzhevsky District
- Pustoshka (Berezhanskaya Rural Settlement), Ostrovsky District, Pskov Oblast, a village in Ostrovsky District; municipally, a part of Berezhanskaya Rural Settlement of that district
- Pustoshka (Shikovskaya Rural Settlement), Ostrovsky District, Pskov Oblast, a village in Ostrovsky District; municipally, a part of Shikovskaya Rural Settlement of that district
- Pustoshka, Porkhovsky District, Pskov Oblast, a village in Porkhovsky District
- Pustoshka, Sebezhsky District, Pskov Oblast, a village in Sebezhsky District

== Smolensk Oblast ==
As of 2010, five rural localities in Smolensk Oblast bear this name:

- Pustoshka, Kholm-Zhirkovsky District, Smolensk Oblast, a village under the administrative jurisdiction of Kholm-Zhirkovskoye Urban Settlement of Kholm-Zhirkovsky District
- Pustoshka, Novoduginsky District, Smolensk Oblast, a village in Izvekovskoye Rural Settlement of Novoduginsky District
- Pustoshka, Sychyovsky District, Smolensk Oblast, a village in Bekhteyevskoye Rural Settlement of Sychyovsky District
- Pustoshka, Poldnevskoye Rural Settlement, Ugransky District, Smolensk Oblast, a village in Poldnevskoye Rural Settlement of Ugransky District
- Pustoshka, Zakharyevskoye Rural Settlement, Ugransky District, Smolensk Oblast, a village in Zakharyevskoye Rural Settlement of Ugransky District

== Tver Oblast ==
As of 2010, eleven rural localities in Tver Oblast bear this name:

- Pustoshka (Grishinskoye Rural Settlement), Oleninsky District, Tver Oblast, a village in Oleninsky District; municipally, a part of Grishinskoye Rural Settlement of that district
- Pustoshka (Glazkovskoye Rural Settlement), Oleninsky District, Tver Oblast, a village in Oleninsky District; municipally, a part of Glazkovskoye Rural Settlement of that district
- Pustoshka (Kholmetskoye Rural Settlement), Oleninsky District, Tver Oblast, a village in Oleninsky District; municipally, a part of Kholmetskoye Rural Settlement of that district
- Pustoshka (Mostovskoye Rural Settlement), Oleninsky District, Tver Oblast, two villages in Oleninsky District; municipally, a part of Mostovskoye Rural Settlement of that district
- Pustoshka (Dmitrovskoye Rural Settlement), Selizharovsky District, Tver Oblast, a village in Selizharovsky District; municipally, a part of Dmitrovskoye Rural Settlement of that district
- Pustoshka (Okovetskoye Rural Settlement), Selizharovsky District, Tver Oblast, three villages in Selizharovsky District; municipally, a part of Okovetskoye Rural Settlement of that district
- Pustoshka, Spirovsky District, Tver Oblast, a village in Spirovsky District
- Pustoshka, Zharkovsky District, Tver Oblast, a settlement in Zharkovsky District

== Vologda Oblast ==
As of 2010, six rural localities in Vologda Oblast bear this name:

- Pustoshka, Kuysky natsionalny vepssky Selsoviet, Babayevsky District, Vologda Oblast, a village in Kuysky natsionalny vepssky Selsoviet of Babayevsky District
- Pustoshka, Novolukinsky Selsoviet, Babayevsky District, Vologda Oblast, a village in Novolukinsky Selsoviet of Babayevsky District
- Pustoshka, Timoshinsky Selsoviet, Babayevsky District, Vologda Oblast, a village in Timoshinsky Selsoviet of Babayevsky District
- Pustoshka, Cherepovetsky District, Vologda Oblast, a village in Nikolo-Ramensky Selsoviet of Cherepovetsky District
- Pustoshka, Sheksninsky District, Vologda Oblast, a village in Yershovsky Selsoviet of Sheksninsky District
- Pustoshka, Sokolsky District, Vologda Oblast, a village in Chuchkovsky Selsoviet of Sokolsky District

== Yaroslavl Oblast ==
As of 2010, three rural localities in Yaroslavl Oblast bear this name:

- Pustoshka, Nekouzsky District, Yaroslavl Oblast, a village in Latskovsky Rural Okrug of Nekouzsky District
- Pustoshka, Nekrasovsky District, Yaroslavl Oblast, a village in Yakushevsky Rural Okrug of Nekrasovsky District
- Pustoshka, Poshekhonsky District, Yaroslavl Oblast, a village in Voshchikovsky Rural Okrug of Poshekhonsky District
