= Administrative divisions of Kostroma Oblast =

Administrative districts of Russian federal subject

Kostroma Oblast Russia
- Administrative center: Kostroma

Administrative structure (as of 2013)
- Districts: 24
- Cities/towns: 12
- Urban-type settlements: 7
- Settlements (поселения): 137

Municipal structure (as of 2002)
- Rural settlements: 3,598 (inhabited); 789 (uninhabited)

Administrative divisions of Kostroma Oblast lists all of the various administrative divisions that comprise Kostroma Oblast in west-central Russia.

== Administrative divisions ==
- Cities and towns under the oblast's jurisdiction:
  - Kostroma (Кострома) (administrative center)
  - Buy (Буй)
  - Galich (Галич)
  - Manturovo (Мантурово)
  - Nerekhta (Нерехта)
  - Neya (Нея)
  - Sharya (Шарья)
    - Urban-type settlements under the town's jurisdiction:
      - Vetluzhsky (Ветлужский)
  - Volgorechensk (Волгореченск)
- Districts:
  - Antropovsky (Антроповский)
    - with 5 settlements under the district's jurisdiction.
  - Buysky (Буйский)
    - Urban-type settlements under the district's jurisdiction:
      - Chistye Bory (Чистые Боры)
    - with 2 settlements under the district's jurisdiction.
  - Chukhlomsky (Чухломский)
    - Towns under the district's jurisdiction:
      - Chukhloma (Чухлома)
    - with 7 settlements under the district's jurisdiction.
  - Galichsky (Галичский)
    - with 5 settlements under the district's jurisdiction.
  - Kadyysky (Кадыйский)
    - Urban-type settlements under the district's jurisdiction:
      - Kadyy (Кадый)
    - with 7 settlements under the district's jurisdiction.
  - Kologrivsky (Кологривский)
    - Towns under the district's jurisdiction:
      - Kologriv (Кологрив)
    - with 4 settlements under the district's jurisdiction.
  - Kostromskoy (Костромской)
    - with 13 settlements under the district's jurisdiction.
  - Krasnoselsky (Красносельский)
    - Urban-type settlements under the district's jurisdiction:
      - Krasnoye-na-Volge (Красное-на-Волге)
    - with 8 settlements under the district's jurisdiction.
  - Makaryevsky (Макарьевский)
    - Towns under the district's jurisdiction:
      - Makaryev (Макарьев)
    - with 7 settlements under the district's jurisdiction.
  - Manturovsky (Мантуровский)
    - with 5 settlements under the district's jurisdiction.
  - Mezhevskoy (Межевской)
    - with 4 settlements under the district's jurisdiction.
  - Nerekhtsky (Нерехтский)
    - with 4 settlements under the district's jurisdiction.
  - Neysky (Нейский)
    - with 8 settlements under the district's jurisdiction.
  - Oktyabrsky (Октябрьский)
    - with 5 settlements under the district's jurisdiction.
  - Ostrovsky (Островский)
    - with 6 settlements under the district's jurisdiction.
  - Parfenyevsky (Парфеньевский)
    - with 4 settlements under the district's jurisdiction.
  - Pavinsky (Павинский)
    - with 4 settlements under the district's jurisdiction.
  - Ponazyrevsky (Поназыревский)
    - Urban-type settlements under the district's jurisdiction:
      - Ponazyrevo (Поназырево)
    - with 3 settlements under the district's jurisdiction.
  - Pyshchugsky (Пыщугский)
    - with 4 settlements under the district's jurisdiction.
  - Sharyinsky (Шарьинский)
    - with 10 settlements under the district's jurisdiction.
  - Soligalichsky (Солигаличский)
    - Towns under the district's jurisdiction:
      - Soligalich (Солигалич)
    - with 7 settlements under the district's jurisdiction.
  - Sudislavsky (Судиславский)
    - Urban-type settlements under the district's jurisdiction:
      - Sudislavl (Судиславль)
    - with 3 settlements under the district's jurisdiction.
  - Susaninsky (Сусанинский)
    - Urban-type settlements under the district's jurisdiction:
      - Susanino (Сусанино)
    - with 6 settlements under the district's jurisdiction.
  - Vokhomsky (Вохомский)
    - with 6 settlements under the district's jurisdiction.
