= Neya (inhabited locality) =

Neya (Russian: Нея) is the name of several inhabited localities in Kostroma Oblast, Russia.

Urban localities

- Neya (town), a town; 58°18′N 43°52′E

Rural localities

- Neya (rural locality), a settlement in Khmelevskoye Settlement of Ponazyrevsky District; 58°24′N 46°31′E
