= Bolshoi Dor =

Village in Russia

Bolshoi Dor Большой Дор
- Village
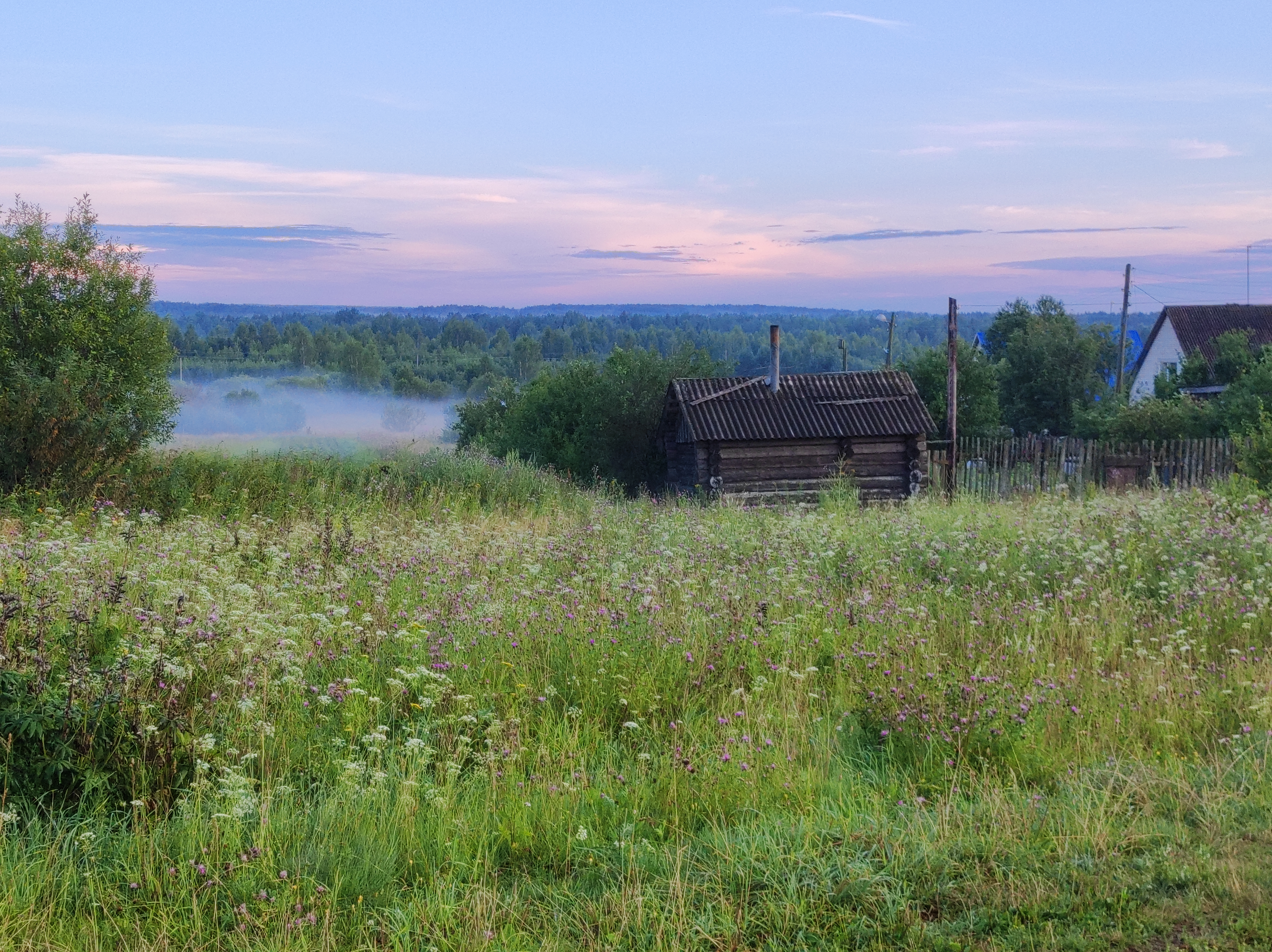
- Interactive map of Bolshoi Dor
- Location of Bolshoi Dor Bolshoi Dor (Kostroma Oblast)
- Coordinates: 58.342106°N 41.385159°E
- Country: Russia
- Federal subject: Kostroma Oblast
- Administrative district: Buysky District

Population
  - Estimate (156): 225 )
- Time zone: UTC+3 (MSK)
- Postal code: 157046
- OKTMO ID: 34604466157

Bolshoi Dor (Большой Дор) is a village in Buysky District in Kostroma Oblast, Russia.

== Geography ==
The village is located approximately 16 km or 10 mi away from the nearest town Buy next to the river Pis'ma (≈ 2 km or 1.25 mi).

Bolshoi Dor is surrounded by beautiful fields and forests.

== History ==
In 1872, 30 households were in the village. In 1907 the number increased up to 47

== Population ==
There was 149 people in 1872, 192 in 1897, 254 in 1907, 219 in 2002 and 156 in 2022. The number of people in the village is slowly decreasing.

== Infrastructure ==
A club, a school, one grocery shop, an outpatient clinic, a post office are located in the village. There is also a playground next to the club.

== Monuments ==
Next to the playground you can find a monument in honor of countrymen, who fought against the Nazi Germany in the Great Patriotic War.
