= Adrian Puzanovsky =

Russian politician (1942–2023)

- Адриан Пузановский

Member of the State Duma
- In office 1993–2003

Personal details
- Born: Adrian Georgyevich Puzanovsky; 3 January 1942 Edineț District, Romania
- Died: 21 October 2023 (aged 81)

Adrian Georgyevich Puzanovsky (Russian: Адриан Георгиевич Пузановский; 3 January 1942 – 21 October 2023) was a Russian politician who was a member of the first, second and third convocations of the State Duma from 1993 to 2003.

== Early life and career ==
Adrian Puzanovsky was born on 3 January 1942 in the Edineț District of the Moldavian Soviet Socialist Republic (now the Republic of Moldova), to his father, Georgy Yakovlevich, and to his mother, Anna Denisovna Puzanovskaya (Pchelkina).

In 1965, he graduated from the Chișinău State University named after V. I. Lenin. He was a doctor of economic sciences, and a professor. He was engaged in teaching activities. In 1982, he attended the Kostroma Agricultural Institute.

From 1993, Puzanovsky was a member of the first, second and third convocations of the State Duma from the Kostroma single-mandate constituency. In the first convocation he was elected from the Dignity and Charity bloc, in the second convocation - from the Agrarian Party, in the third he was a member of the People's Deputy group.

== Personal life and death ==
Puzanovsky was married to Margarita Semyonovna Puzanovskaya (born 1947). They had two children, son Aleksandr and daughter Valeria, and three grandchildren, Anfisa, Yevgeny, and Konstantin.

Adrian Puzanovsky died on 21 October 2023, at the age of 81.
