= Alexey Sitnikov =

Alexey Sitnikov may refer to:

- Alexei Sitnikov (born 1986), Russian and Azerbaijani ice dancer
- Alexey Sitnikov (politician, born 1971), Russian politician and member of the State Duma
- Alexey Sitnikov (politician, born 1966), Russian politician and senator from Yamalo-Nenets Autonomous Okrug
