= Vetluzhsky (urban locality) =

Vetluzhsky (Russian: Ветлужский; masculine), Vetluzhskaya (Ветлужская; feminine), or Vetluzhskoye (Ветлужское; neuter) is the name of several urban localities in Russia:

- Vetluzhsky, Kostroma Oblast, an urban-type settlement under the administrative jurisdiction of the town of oblast significance of Sharya, Kostroma Oblast
- Vetluzhsky, Nizhny Novgorod Oblast, a work settlement in Krasnobakovsky District of Nizhny Novgorod Oblast
