= Vetluzhsky =

Vetluzhsky (masculine), Vetluzhskaya (feminine), or Vetluzhskoye (neuter) may refer to:

- Vetluzhsky District, a district of Nizhny Novgorod Oblast, Russia
- Vetluzhsky (urban locality) (Vetluzhskaya, Vetluzhskoye), name of several urban localities in Russia
