= Kryakutnoy =

Fictional Russian inventor

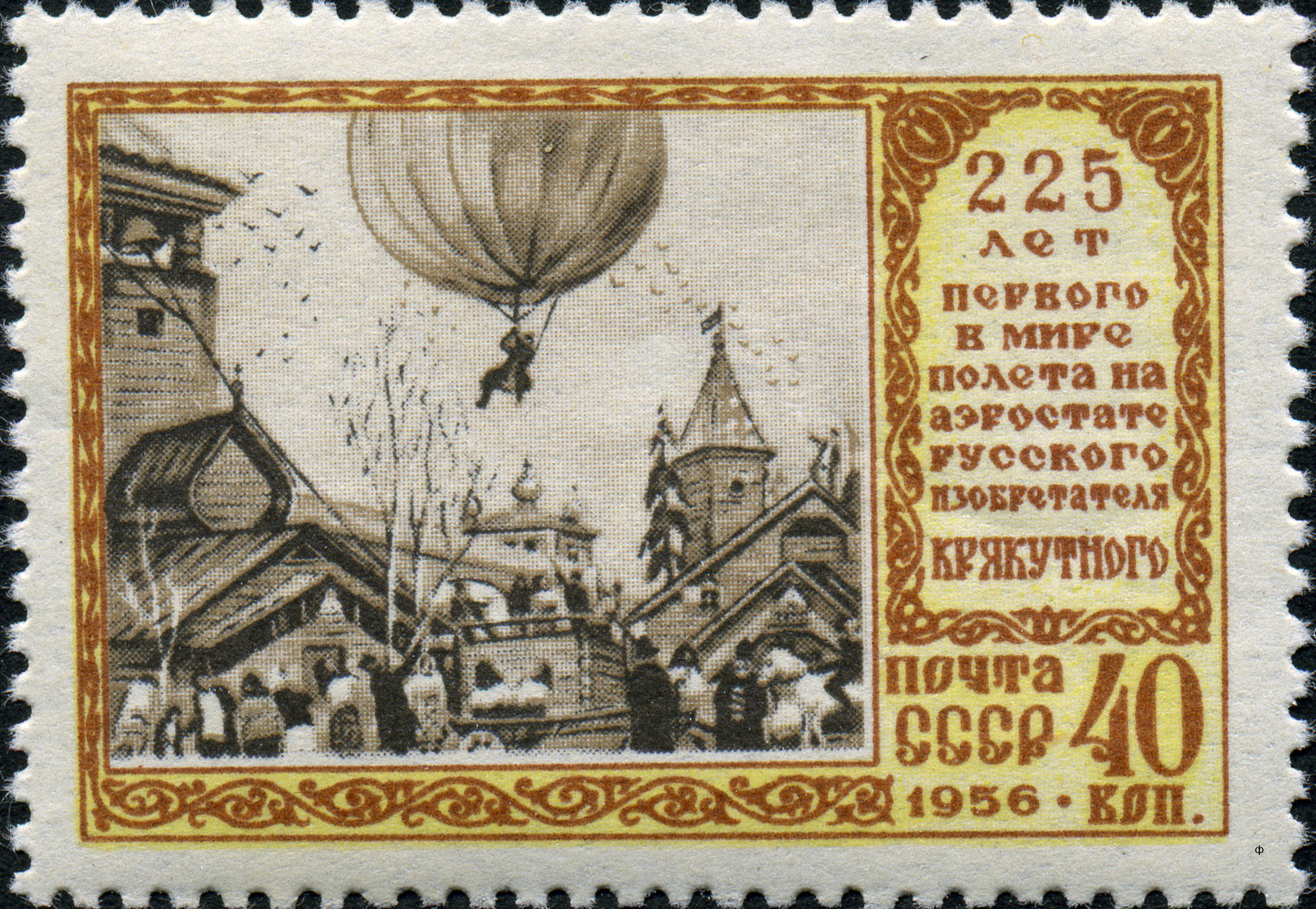
1956 Soviet stamp presenting Kryakutnoy as a real person

Kryakutnoy (Russian: Крякутной) or Furtzel (Russian: Фурцель) was a fictional early 18th-century Russian inventor, who allegedly invented the hot air balloon fifty years before the Montgolfier brothers.

In 1820s or 1830, collector and well-known forger Aleksandr Ivanovich Sulakadzev claimed to have discovered a following fragment in a chronicle attributed to a Ryazan police officer:

1731 года подьячий нерехтец Крякутной фурвин сделал как мяч большой, надул дымом поганым и вонючим, от него сделал петлю, сел в нее, и нечистая сила подняла его выше березы и после ударила о колокольню, но он уцепился за веревку, чем звонят, и так остался жив

Translated:

In 1731 scrivener Kryakutnoy from Nerekhta [a town close to Kostroma] made a furvin [an otherwise unknown word ostensibly signifying the balloon] like a big ball, blew it up with smoke unclean and smelly, made a loop, sat into it; and the devil raised him above the birch tree and the hit him of the bell tower; but he managed to hang onto a bell rope and so he survived.

Later the Sulakadzev's text tells that for his witchcraft the inventor should be executed, but was spared and only exiled to Solovetsky Monastery under promise to never fly again.

The text was interpreted as a description of a hot air balloon invented fifty years before Montgolfier brothers. The manuscript was discovered firstly in the 1900s and then rediscovered again in 1940s, at the time of Soviet fight against worshipping the West and was widely used to claim priority of Russian science in Aeronautics and was widely popularized. It is also shown in the Andrei Tarkovsky's movie Andrei Rublev (but set more than three hundred years earlier).

Kryakutnoy's story was largely used during Stalin's "anti-Cosmopolitan" campaign of the late 1940s, in which many foreign inventions and scientific achievements were credited to "forgotten" or "undervalued" Russian personalities of the past. His story was featured in the Big Soviet Encyclopedia, on a postage stamp, in multiple popular publications.

In 1958 Dmitry Likhachov published a book claiming that the original manuscript was falsified:

- The word нерехтец (nerekhtets, resident of Nerekhta) is written over немец (nemets, "German")
- The word Крякутной (Kryakutnoy) is written over крещёной (kreshchonoy, "baptized")
- The word Фурвин (furvin, "balloon") is written over Фурцель (Furtsel).

The change in the manuscript seems to be done by another hand at some point between 1831 and 1901 (possibly closer to the later date when the manuscript was first published). The rest of the document appears to be an original manuscript of Sulakadzev, whose work however has no credence either as he was known for his forgeries. The unlucky inventor of the hot air balloon thus was, according to Sulakadzev's original concoction, not a Nerekhta resident Kryakutnoy but a German baptized in Orthodox Christianity with the last name Furtzel. Later this fictional German was Russified to make the story more patriotic. Moreover, the German's name Furtzel (literally "farter") sounded like a reference to the invention.

Regardless of Likhachov's discovery, Kryakutnoy's story was still mentioned as real in popular publications, most notably in multiple publications of "Tekhnika-molodezhi" (a popular Soviet magazine of science fiction and popular mechanics).

Although the story is considered now by the historians to be a hoax, it is still mentioned occasionally in fiction and in popular writing on aeronautics. In particular, the city of Nerekhta, the alleged home city of the "inventor", organized the Ivan Kryakutnoy Ballooning Festival (the 1st took place in 2016, and the 3rd in 2019).

Although Kryakutnoy's first name was never mentioned in the source text, he is named as either Nikita or Ivan in popular publications, local memorials and exhibitions.
