= Kostromskoy District =

Kostromskoy District Костромской район (Russian)
- District
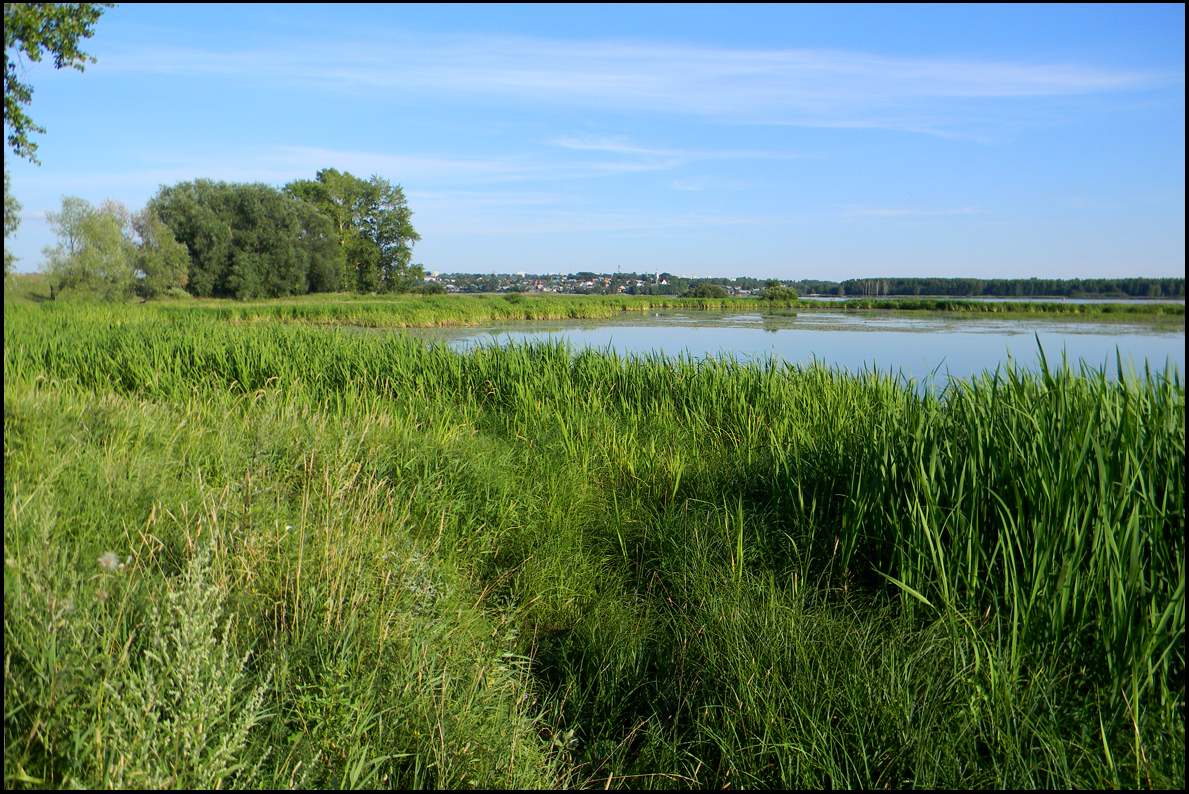
- Volga River, Kostromsky District

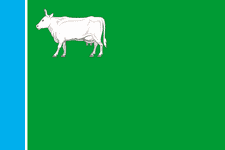
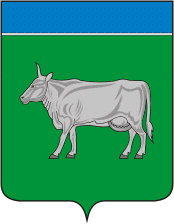
- Flag Coat of arms
- Location of Kostromskoy District in Kostroma Oblast
- Coordinates: 57°46′N 40°56′E
- Country: Russia
- Federal subject: Kostroma Oblast
- Established: 1928
- Administrative center: Kostroma

Area
  - Total: 2,032 km^{2} (785 sq mi)

Population (2010 Census)
  - Total: 44,524
  - Density: 21.91/km^{2} (56.75/sq mi)
  - Urban: 0%
  - Rural: 100%

Administrative structure
  - Administrative divisions: 13 Settlements
  - Inhabited localities: 279 rural localities

Municipal structure
  - Municipally incorporated as: Kostromskoy Municipal District
  - Municipal divisions: 0 urban settlements, 13 rural settlements
- Time zone: UTC+3 (MSK)
- OKTMO ID: 34614000
- Website: http://admkr.ru/

Kostromskoy District (Russian: Костромско́й райо́н) is an administrative and municipal district (raion), one of the twenty-four in Kostroma Oblast, Russia. It is located in the southwest of the oblast. The area of the district is 2,032 square kilometers (785 sq mi). Its administrative center is the city of Kostroma (which is not administratively a part of the district). Population: 42,407 (2021 census); 44,524 (2010 census); 43,904 (2002 Census); 49,442 (1989 Soviet census).

== Geography ==
Kostromskoy District is located on the western edge of Kostroma Oblast, on the border with Yaroslavl Oblast. The Volga River runs from west to east through the southern section of the district, and the Kostroma River enters from the north through the Gorky Reservoir. 44% of the district is in agricultural production, 32% is forested, and about 10% is a dense network of lakes, swamps, and rivers. Kostromskoy District surrounds the regional city of Kostroma, and is 270 km northeast of Moscow. The area measures 80 km (north-south), and 40 km (west-east); total area is 2,032 km2 (about 3% of Kostroma Oblast). The administrative center is the town of Kostroma.

The district is bordered on the north by Buysky District, on the east by Susaninsky District, Sudislavsky, and Krasnoselsky District; and on the south by Nerekhtsky District.

== History ==
Kostromskoy District was formally created in 1928 out of Kostroma Uyezd. In 1929 it became part of Ivanovo Industrial Oblast. In 1932 it was liquidated and attached to the City of Kostroma, then reconstituted in 1935. It became part of Yaroslavl Oblast in 1936, before finally becoming part of Kostroma Oblast in 1944.

== Administrative and municipal status ==
Within the framework of administrative divisions, Kostromskoy District is one of the twenty-four in the oblast. The city of Kostroma serves as its administrative center, despite being incorporated separately as a city of oblast significance—an administrative unit with the status equal to that of the districts.

As a municipal division, the district is incorporated as Kostromskoy Municipal District. The city of oblast significance of Kostroma is incorporated separately from the district as Kostroma Urban Okrug.
