= Manturovo =

Manturovo (Russian: Мантурово) is the name of several inhabited localities in Russia.

Urban localities

- Manturovo, Kostroma Oblast, a town in Kostroma Oblast

Rural localities

- Manturovo, Ivanovo Oblast, a village in Zavolzhsky District of Ivanovo Oblast
- Manturovo, Kursk Oblast, a selo in Manturovsky Selsoviet of Manturovsky District of Kursk Oblast
- Manturovo, Ryazan Oblast, a village in Bagramovsky Rural Okrug of Rybnovsky District of Ryazan Oblast
