= Viga (river) =

- Native name: Вига (Russian)

Location
- Country: Russia

Physical characteristics
- Mouth: Unzha
  - coordinates: 59°13′44″N 43°40′46″E
- Length: 175 km (109 mi)
- Basin size: 3,360 km^{2} (1,300 sq mi)

Basin features
- Progression: Unzha→ Volga→ Caspian Sea

The Viga (Russian: Вига) is a river in Kostroma Oblast in Russia, a right tributary of the Unzha. It is 175 kilometres (109 mi) long, and its basin covers 3,360 square kilometres (1,300 mi^{2}).
