= Chistye Bory =

Chistye Bory Чистые Боры
- Urban-type settlement
- Interactive map of Chistye Bory
- Location of Chistye Bory Chistye Bory (Kostroma Oblast)
- Coordinates: 58.3690°N 41.6532°E
- Country: Russia
- Federal subject: Kostroma Oblast
- Administrative district: Buysky District

Population (2010 Census)
  - Total: 4,796
  - Estimate (2025): 3,918 (−18.3%)
- Time zone: UTC+3 (MSK)
- Postal code: 157049
- OKTMO ID: 34604159051

Chistye Bory (Russian: Чи́стые Боры́) is an urban locality (an urban-type settlement) in Buysky District of Kostroma Oblast, Russia. Population: 4,048 (2021 census); 4,796 (2010 census); 5,056 (2002 census); 3,108 (1989 Soviet census).
