= Vetluzhsky, Kostroma Oblast =

Vetluzhsky Ветлужский
- Urban-type settlement
- Interactive map of Vetluzhsky
- Location of Vetluzhsky Vetluzhsky (Kostroma Oblast)
- Coordinates: 58.3943°N 45.4740°E
- Country: Russia
- Federal subject: Kostroma Oblast
- Administrative district: Sharya

Population (2010 Census)
  - Total: 12,224
  - Estimate (2025): 9,243 (−24.4%)
- Time zone: UTC+3 (MSK)
- Postal code: 157510
- OKTMO ID: 34730000056

Vetluzhsky (Russian: Ветлу́жский) is an urban locality (an urban-type settlement) in Kostroma Oblast, Russia. Population: 9,548 (2021 census); 12,224 (2010 census); 13,576 (2002 census); 15,029 (1989 Soviet census).

== Administrative and municipal status ==
Within the framework of administrative divisions, Vetluzhsky, as an administrative division, together with the town of Sharya and three rural localities, incorporated separately as the town of oblast significance of Sharya—an administrative unit with the status equal to that of the districts. As a municipal division, Vetluzhsky, as part of the town of oblast significance of Sharya, is incorporated as Sharya Urban Okrug.
