= Pochinok, Kipelovsky Selsoviet, Vologodsky District, Vologda Oblast =

Pochinok Починок
- Village
- Location within Vologda Oblast Location within Russia
- Coordinates: 59°18′N 39°07′E
- Country: Russia
- Region: Vologda Oblast
- District: Vologodsky District
- Time zone: UTC+3:00

Pochinok (Russian: Починок) is a rural locality (a village) in Mayskoye Rural Settlement, Vologodsky District, Vologda Oblast, Russia. The population was 2 as of 2002.

== Geography ==
The distance to Vologda is 67 km, to Striznevo is 16 km. Semyonkovo is the nearest rural locality.
