= Alexey Sitnikov (politician, born 1971) =

Russian politician

- Алексей Ситников
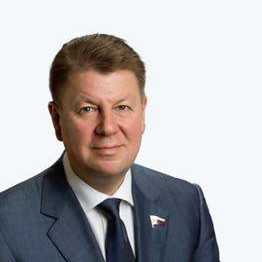

Member of the State Duma for Kostroma Oblast
- Incumbent
- Assumed office 5 October 2016
- Preceded by: constituency re-established
- Constituency: Kostroma-at-large (No. 107)

Member of the State Duma (Party List Seat)
- In office 21 December 2011 – 5 October 2016

Personal details
- Born: 19 June 1971 (age 55) Krasnoye-na-Volge, Kostroma Oblast, Russian SFSR, USSR
- Party: United Russia
- Education: Russian State Agrarian University – Moscow Timiryazev Agricultural Academy

Alexey Vladimirovich Sitnikov (Russian: Алексей Владимирович Ситников; June 19, 1971, Krasnoye-na-Volge, Kostroma Oblast) is a Russian political figure, deputy of the 8th State Duma.

From 2004 to 2016, Sitnikov was the deputy of the Kostroma Oblast Duma of the 3rd, 4th, 5th and 6th convocations. In 2011, he was elected deputy of the 6th State Duma. In 2016 and 2021, he was re-elected for the 7th and 8th State Dumas.

== See also ==
- List of Heroes of the Russian Federation
