= Nerekhta, Kostroma Oblast =

Town in Kostroma Oblast, Russia

Nerekhta Нерехта
- Town
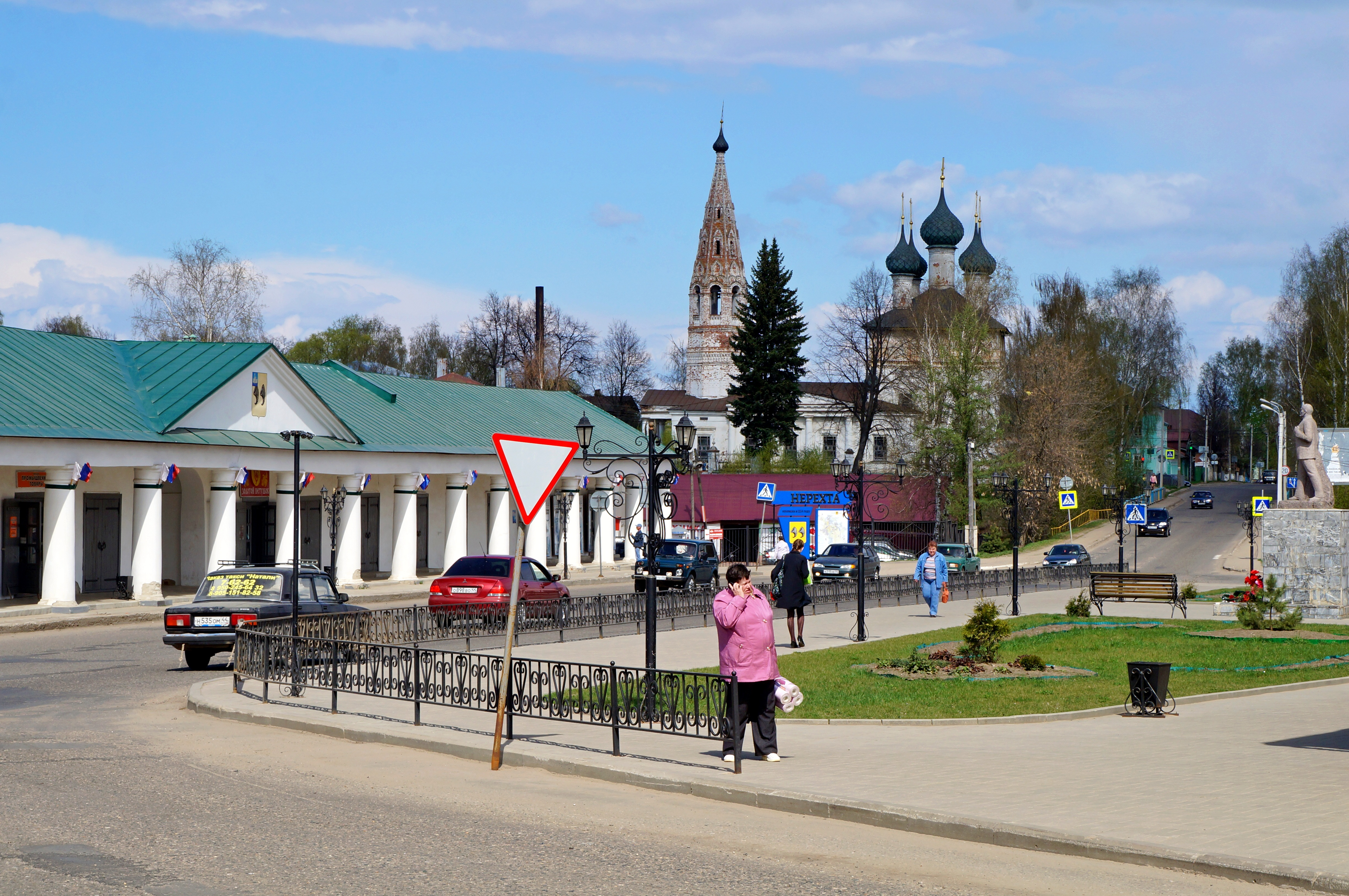
- Town Center ("Freedom Square"), Nerekhta

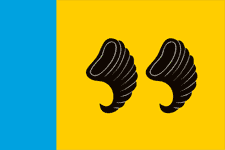
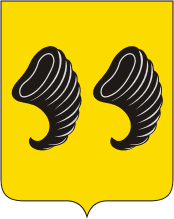
- Flag Coat of arms
- Interactive map of Nerekhta
- Location of Nerekhta Nerekhta (Kostroma Oblast)
- Coordinates: 57°27′N 40°35′E
- Country: Russia
- Federal subject: Kostroma Oblast
- Known since: early 13th century
- Elevation: 100 m (330 ft)

Population (2010 Census)
  - Total: 22,828
  - Estimate (2021): 19,977 (−12.5%)

Administrative status
  - Subordinated to: town of oblast significance of Nerekhta
  - Capital of: Nerekhtsky District, town of oblast significance of Nerekhta

Municipal status
  - Municipal district: Nerekhtsky Municipal District
  - Urban settlement: Nerekhta Urban Settlement
  - Capital of: Nerekhtsky Municipal District, Nerekhta Urban Settlement
- Time zone: UTC+3 (MSK)
- Postal code: 157800–157802
- Dialing code: +7 49431
- OKTMO ID: 34626101001
- Website: nerexta.ru

Nerekhta (Russian: Не́рехта) is a town in Kostroma Oblast, Russia. Population: 19,977 (2021 census); 22,828 (2010 census); 26,002 (2002 census); 29,295 (1989 Soviet census).

== History ==
The first historical record of the town is in the records of Pereslavl-Suzdal Monastery in 1214. The town does not retain many marks of antiquity, apart from several 17th-century churches. It has been known for its textiles since the 19th century.

== Etymology ==
The town is named after a river on which it's located. There are several other rivers named Nerekhta in central Russia, and this hydronym is believed to come from a substrate Finno-Ugric language (cf. Meadow Mari: нер 'cape, foreland'). The reconstruction *(i)ne-(j)еr-еxta ('river of a big lake') is viewed by Aleksandr Matveyev as unconvincing, since there are no big lakes within the basins of any rivers named Nerekhta.

== Administrative and municipal status ==
Within the framework of administrative divisions, Nerekhta serves as the administrative center of Nerekhtsky District, even though it is not a part of it. As an administrative division, it is incorporated separately as the town of oblast significance of Nerekhta—an administrative unit with a status equal to that of the districts. As a municipal division, the town of oblast significance of Nerekhta is incorporated within Nerekhtsky Municipal District as Nerekhta Urban Settlement.

== Transportation ==
Railway lines connect the town to Yaroslavl, Kostroma, and Ivanovo.

== Sports ==
The bandy club Start plays in a recreational league. It will participate in the Russian Rink Bandy Cup 2017.

== See also ==
- Kryakutnoy
