= Manturovo, Kostroma Oblast =

Town in Kostroma Oblast, Russia

Manturovo Мантурово
- Town
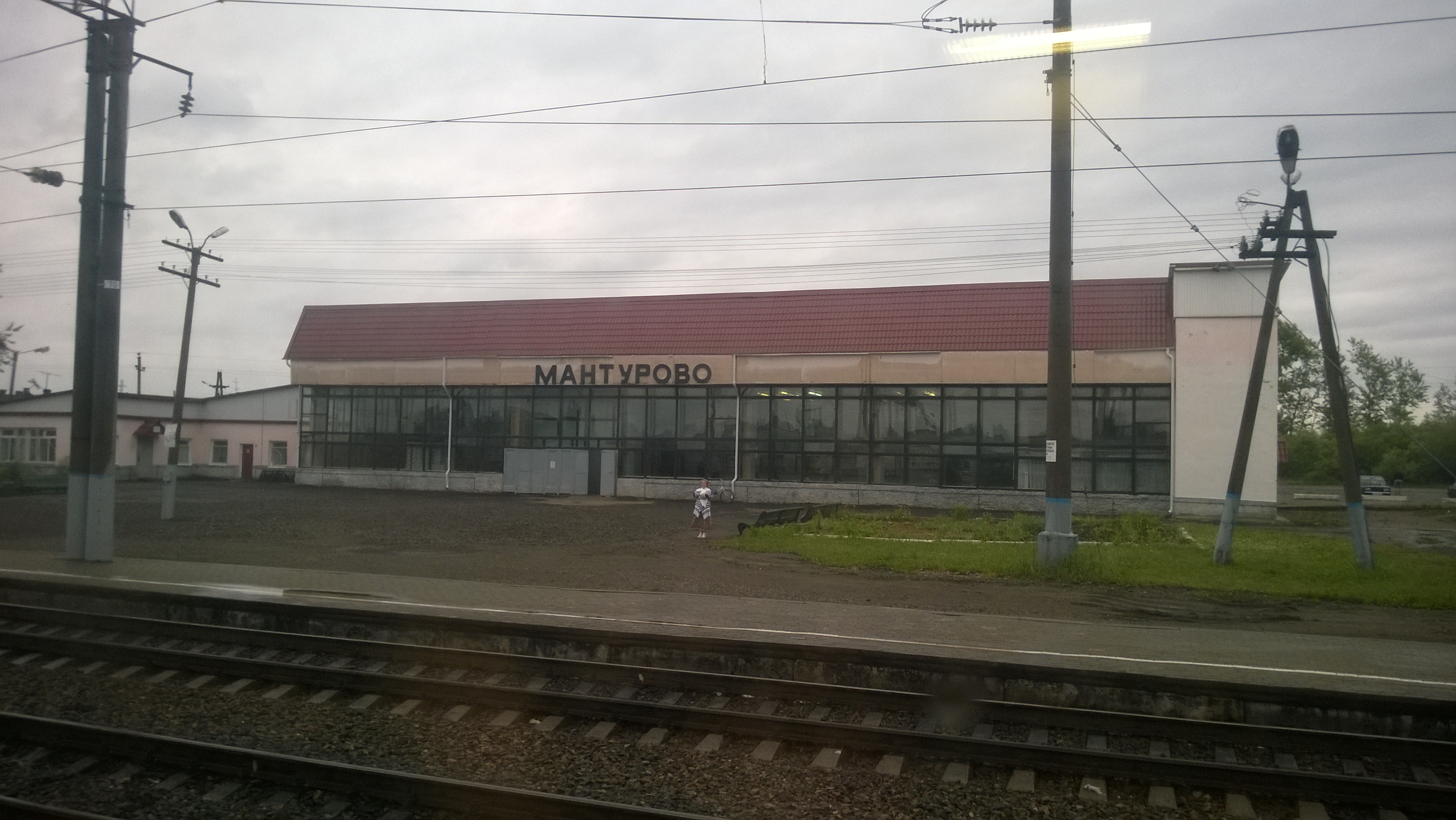
- Manturovo Station

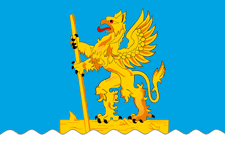
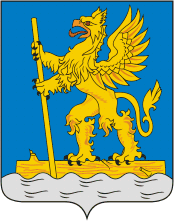
- Flag Coat of arms
- Interactive map of Manturovo
- Location of Manturovo Manturovo (Kostroma Oblast)
- Coordinates: 58°20′N 44°46′E
- Country: Russia
- Federal subject: Kostroma Oblast
- First mentioned: 1617
- Town status since: 1958
- Elevation: 120 m (390 ft)

Population (2010 Census)
  - Total: 17,479
  - Estimate (2021): 13,043 (−25.4%)

Administrative status
  - Subordinated to: town of oblast significance of Manturovo
  - Capital of: Manturovsky District, town of oblast significance of Manturovo

Municipal status
  - Urban okrug: Manturovo Urban Okrug
  - Capital of: Manturovo Urban Okrug, Manturovsky Municipal District
- Time zone: UTC+3 (MSK)
- Postal code: 157300
- OKTMO ID: 34714000001
- Website: manturovo.org

Manturovo (Russian: Ма́нтурово) is a town in Kostroma Oblast, Russia, located on the right bank of the Unzha River (Volga's tributary), 260 kilometers (160 mi) northeast of Kostroma, the administrative center of the oblast. Population: 13,043 (2021 census); 17,479 (2010 census); 19,457 (2002 census); 22,452 (1989 Soviet census); 22,000 (1970).

== Paleontology ==
Fossil of temnospondyl amphibian Wetlugasaurus was found in the Lower Triassic (Lower Olenekian) deposits of Manturovo.

== History ==
An ancient Finno-Ugric Meri trading settlement and a wooden hill fortress once existed on the site of modern Manturovo, at the confluence of the Unzha and Mezha Rivers. The name means Mantu = Podzol, Rova = higher place in sparsely coniferous forest. According to its name it have had a Saame or Nenents roots. Finno-Ugrian Rova derives from Saame (Sami) word Roavve which means hill or open place as result of forest fire. Thus the place was inhabited at least c. 2000 BCE. It became a Meri settlement by c. 300 CE and remained such until at least the 14th century.

The Russian village of Manturovo was first mentioned in 1617. Later on, it grew into a town and was granted town status in 1958.

== Administrative and municipal status ==
Within the framework of administrative divisions, Manturovo serves as the administrative center of Manturovsky District, even though it is not a part of it. As an administrative division, it is incorporated separately as the town of oblast significance of Manturovo—an administrative unit with a status equal to that of the districts. As a municipal division, the town of oblast significance of Manturovo is incorporated as Manturovo Urban Okrug.

== Economy and transportation ==
Manturovo was connected by St. Petersburg–Vyatka Railway to Vyatka and Perm in 1908. Since then it has developed from quiet country village railway station to a forest industry center including a big plywood factory. A Finnish forest company has plans to open a big modern forest industry center to Manturovo, nearly a billion euro investment, if Russian government guarantee its legal ownership according to the WTO standards.
