= Kadyy =

Urban locality in Kostroma Oblast, Russia

Kadyy Кадый
- Urban-type settlement
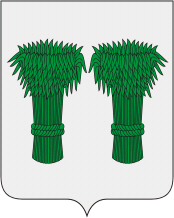
- Coat of arms
- Interactive map of Kadyy
- Location of Kadyy Kadyy (Kostroma Oblast)
- Coordinates: 57°47′21″N 43°11′11″E
- Country: Russia
- Federal subject: Kostroma Oblast
- Administrative district: Kadyysky District
- Elevation: 115 m (377 ft)

Population (2010 Census)
  - Total: 3,597
  - Estimate (2025): 2,930 (−18.5%)
- Time zone: UTC+3 (MSK)
- Postal code: 157980
- OKTMO ID: 34610151051

Kadyy (Russian: Кады́й) is an urban-type settlement and the administrative center of Kadyysky District, Kostroma Oblast, Russia. Population: 3,102 (2021 census); 3,597 (2010 census); 3,882 (2002 census); 4,147 (1989 Soviet census).
