= Pustoshka, Cherepovetsky District, Vologda Oblast =

Pustoshka Пустошка
- Village
- Location within Vologda Oblast Location within Russia
- Coordinates: 58°52′N 37°24′E
- Country: Russia
- Region: Vologda Oblast
- District: Cherepovetsky District
- Time zone: UTC+3:00

Pustoshka (Russian: Пустошка) is a rural locality (a village) in Nikolo-Ramenskoye Rural Settlement, Cherepovetsky District, Vologda Oblast, Russia. The population was 29 as of 2002.

== Geography ==
Pustoshka is located 74 km (46 mi) southwest of Cherepovets (the district's administrative centre) by road. Buzakovo is the nearest rural locality.
