= Unzha =

River in Russia

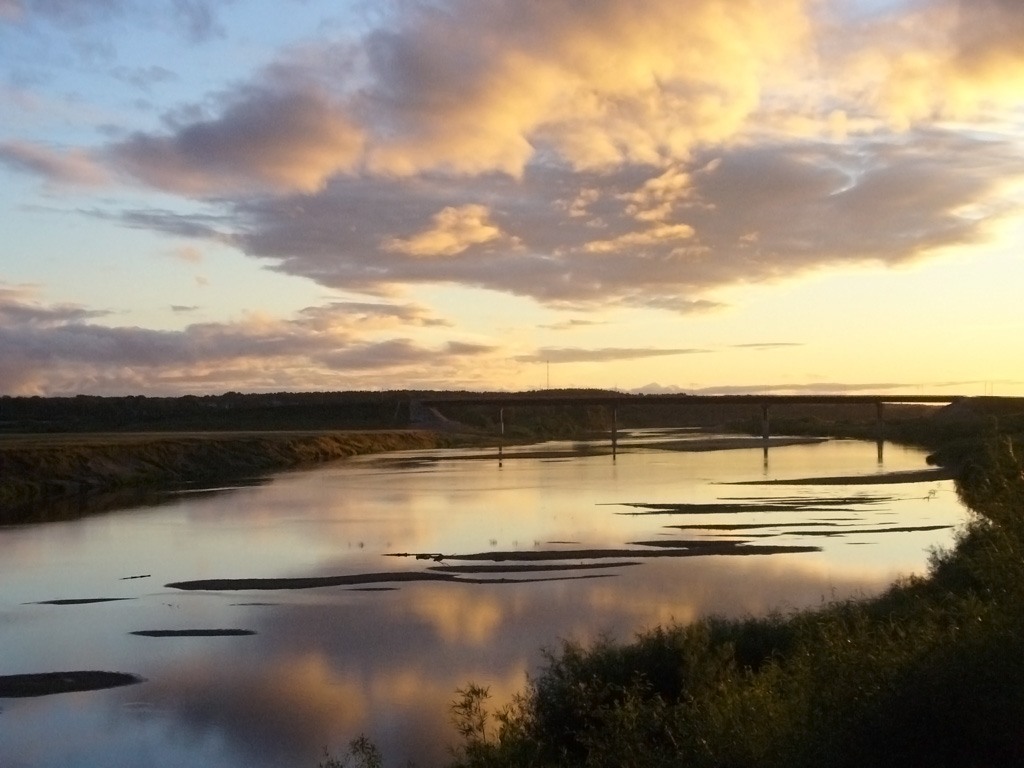
- Unzha near Kologriv
- Native name: Унжа (Russian)

Location
- Country: Russia

Physical characteristics
- Mouth: Volga
  - location: Gorky Reservoir
  - coordinates: 57.5628°N 43.4959°E
- Length: 426 km (265 mi)
- Basin size: 27,800 km^{2} (10,700 sq mi)

Basin features
- Progression: Volga→ Caspian Sea

The Unzha (Russian: Унжа) is a river in the Vologda and Kostroma oblasts of Russia. It is a tributary of the Volga, which it enters at the Gorky Reservoir. It is 426 kilometres (265 mi) long, and its basin covers 27,800 square kilometres (10,700 mi^{2}). The Unzha begins at the confluence of the rivers Kema and the Lundonga. It flows into the Unzhensky Cove of the Gorky Reservoir.

The Unzha freezes up between October and December and stays under the ice until April or May. The main tributaries are the Viga, Neya, and the Mezha. The towns of Kologriv, Manturovo and Makaryev are along the Unzha River.
