= Neya (town) =

Town in Kostroma Oblast, Russia

Neya Нея
- Town
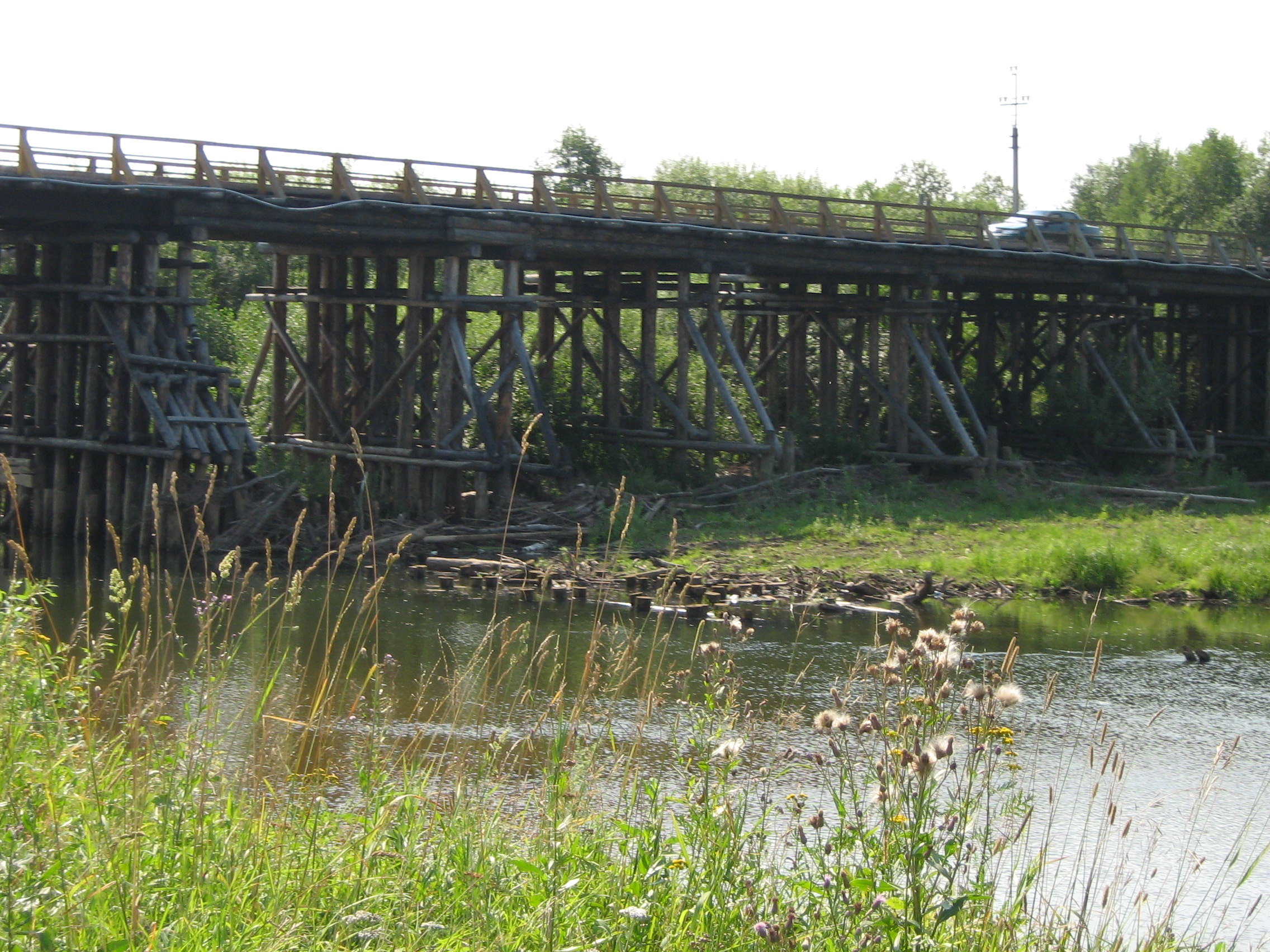
- Bridge over the Ney River, at the entrance to the town

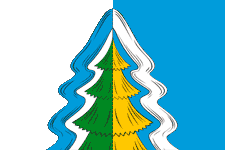
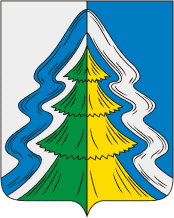
- Flag Coat of arms
- Interactive map of Neya
- Location of Neya Neya (Kostroma Oblast)
- Coordinates: 58°18′N 43°52′E
- Country: Russia
- Federal subject: Kostroma Oblast
- Founded: 1906
- Town status since: 1958
- Elevation: 105 m (344 ft)

Population (2010 Census)
  - Total: 9,827
  - Estimate (2021): 7,816 (−20.5%)

Administrative status
  - Subordinated to: town of oblast significance of Neya
  - Capital of: Neysky District, town of oblast significance of Neya

Municipal status
  - Municipal district: Neysky Municipal District
  - Urban settlement: Neya Urban Settlement
  - Capital of: Neysky Municipal District, Neya Urban Settlement
- Time zone: UTC+3 (MSK)
- Postal code: 157330–157332
- OKTMO ID: 34624101001
- Website: www.neya.info

Neya (Russian: Не́я) is a town in Kostroma Oblast, Russia, located on the right bank of the Neya River (Unzha's tributary), 240 kilometers (150 mi) northeast of Kostroma, the administrative center of the oblast. Population: 7,816 (2021 census); 9,827 (2010 census); 11,506 (2002 census); 13,291 (1989 Soviet census); 14,400 (1970).

== History ==
It was founded in 1906 and granted town status in 1958.

On 27 May 2007, a monument was placed in the Neya town cemetery in memory of those Poles who died in exile after 1,200 were deported to the district in 1940.

== Administrative and municipal status ==
Within the framework of administrative divisions, Neya serves as the administrative center of Neysky District, even though it is not a part of it. As an administrative division, it is incorporated separately as the town of oblast significance of Neya—an administrative unit with a status equal to that of the districts. As a municipal division, the town of oblast significance of Neya is incorporated within Neysky Municipal District as Neya Urban Settlement.
