= Makaryev =

Town in Kostroma Oblast, Russia

Makaryev Макарьев
- Town
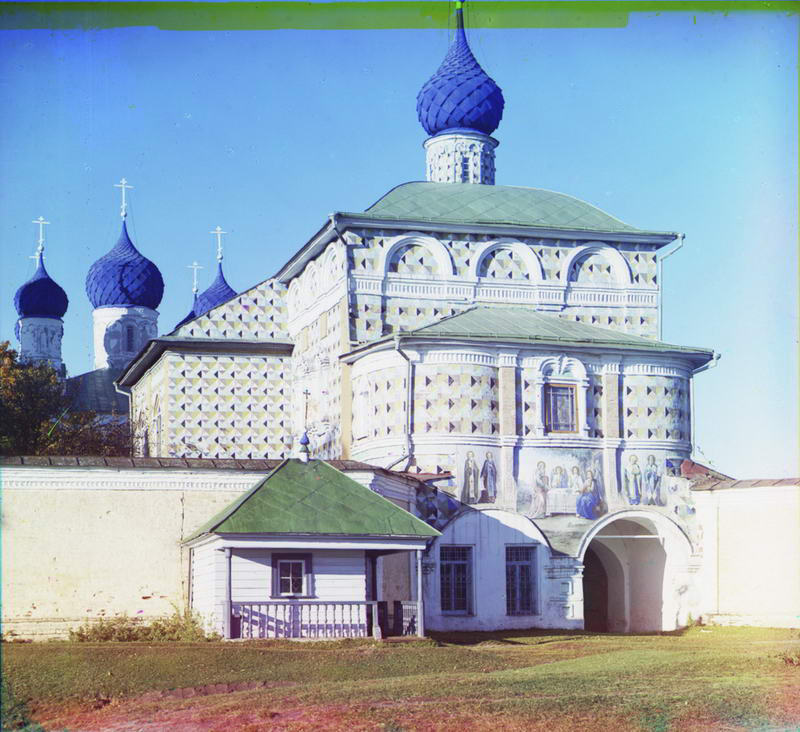
- Unzhensky Monastery in Makaryev

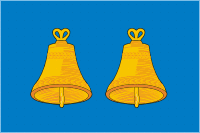
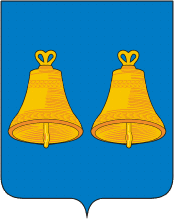
- Flag Coat of arms
- Interactive map of Makaryev
- Location of Makaryev Makaryev (Kostroma Oblast)
- Coordinates: 57°53′N 43°49′E
- Country: Russia
- Federal subject: Kostroma Oblast
- Administrative district: Makaryevsky District
- Town of district significanceSelsoviet: Makaryev
- First mentioned: 1439 (Julian)
- Town status since: 1778
- Elevation: 120 m (390 ft)

Population (2010 Census)
  - Total: 7,274
  - Estimate (2024): 5,463 (−24.9%)

Administrative status
  - Capital of: Makaryevsky District, town of district significance of Makaryev

Municipal status
  - Municipal district: Makaryevsky Municipal District
  - Urban settlement: Makaryev Urban Settlement
  - Capital of: Makaryevsky Municipal District, Makaryev Urban Settlement
- Time zone: UTC+3 (MSK)
- Postal codes: 157460, 157461
- OKTMO ID: 34618101001
- Website: www.makariev.ru

Makaryev (Russian: Мака́рьев) is a town and the administrative center of Makaryevsky District in Kostroma Oblast, Russia, located on the right bank of the Unzha River (Volga's tributary), 184 kilometers (114 mi) east of Kostroma, the administrative center of the oblast. Population: 5,528 (2021 census); 7,274 (2010 census); 7,847 (2002 census); 9,153 (1989 Soviet census).

== History ==
Makariev city planning

In 1439, Makaryevo-Unzhensky monastery was founded on the territory of the modern town. Later, a sloboda grew around the monastery and was granted town status in 1778 under the name of Makaryev-na-Unzhe (Макарьев-на-Унже). By the end of the 19th century the name shortened to "Makaryev".

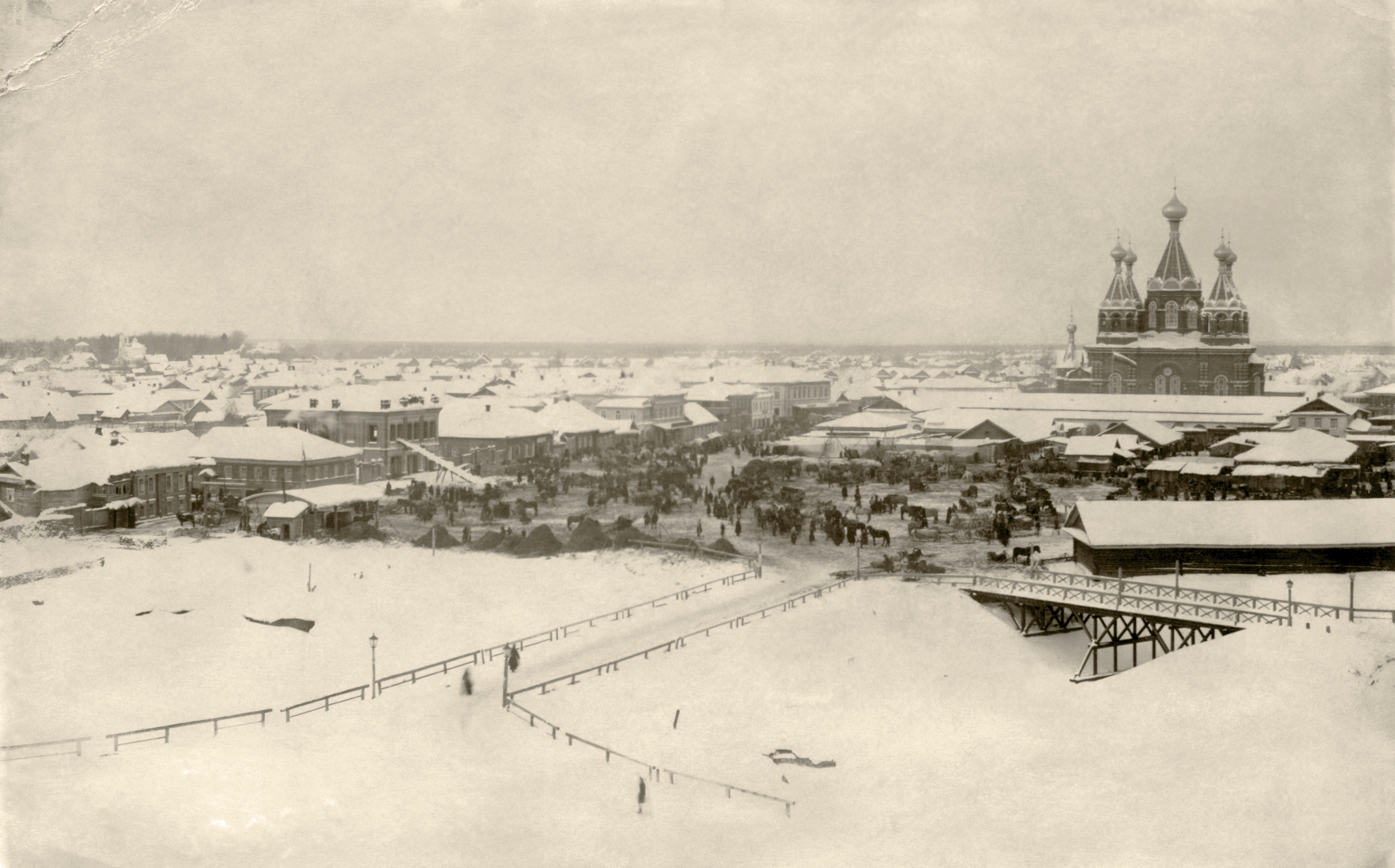

== Administrative and municipal status ==
Within the framework of administrative divisions, Makaryev serves as the administrative center of Makaryevsky District. As an administrative division, it is, together with two rural localities, incorporated within Makaryevsky District as the town of district significance of Makaryev. As a municipal division, the town of district significance of Makaryev is incorporated within Makaryevsky Municipal District as Makaryev Urban Settlement.
