= Ponazyrevo =

Ponazyrevo Поназырево
- Urban-type settlement
- Interactive map of Ponazyrevo
- Location of Ponazyrevo Ponazyrevo (Kostroma Oblast)
- Coordinates: 58.3591°N 46.3197°E
- Country: Russia
- Federal subject: Kostroma Oblast
- Administrative district: Ponazyrevsky District

Population (2010 Census)
  - Total: 4,840
  - Estimate (2025): 2,829 (−41.5%)
- Time zone: UTC+3 (MSK)
- Postal code: 157580
- OKTMO ID: 34636151051

Ponazyrevo (Russian: Пона́зырево) is an urban locality (an urban-type settlement) in Ponazyrevsky District of Kostroma Oblast, Russia. Population: 4,840 (2010 census); 4,988 (2002 census); 5,621 (1989 Soviet census).
