= Dignity and Charity =

Dignity and Charity Достоинство и милосердие
- Abbreviation: DM
- Leader: Konstantin Frolov
- Founded: October 1993
- Registered: 10 November 1993
- Dissolved: 1995
- Merged into: Ivan Rybkin Bloc
- Headquarters: 121165 Moscow, Kutuzovsky Prospekt, 30/32.
- Ideology: Federalism; Veterans' rights Disabled rights
- Political position: Big tent
- 1st State Duma: 3 / 450

Dignity and Charity (Russian: Достоинство и милосердие, romanized: Dostoinstvo i miloserdiye) was an electoral bloc in Russia.

== History ==
Dignity and Charity was founded in October 1993 on the basis of the All-Russian Council of War and Labor Veterans, the All-Russian Society of the Disabled, and the Chernobyl Union of Russia. It was registered by the Central Election Commission on 10 November 1993. Vice-president of the Russian Academy of Sciences Konstantin Frolov was party leader.

The party nominated 58 candidates on its federal list for the December 1993 parliamentary elections, including actor Nikolai Gubenko, president of the Russian Chernobyl Union Vyacheslav Grishin, actress Tatiana Doronina. The bloc supported separation of powers and proposed to increase spending on social welfare programs.

In received 0.7% of the proportional representation vote, failing to cross the electoral threshold. However, it won three constituency seats in the State Duma; Kostroma, Preobrazhensky and Zavodskoy.

It did not contest any further elections.
