= Ponazyrevsky District =

Ponazyrevsky District Поназыревский район (Russian)
- District
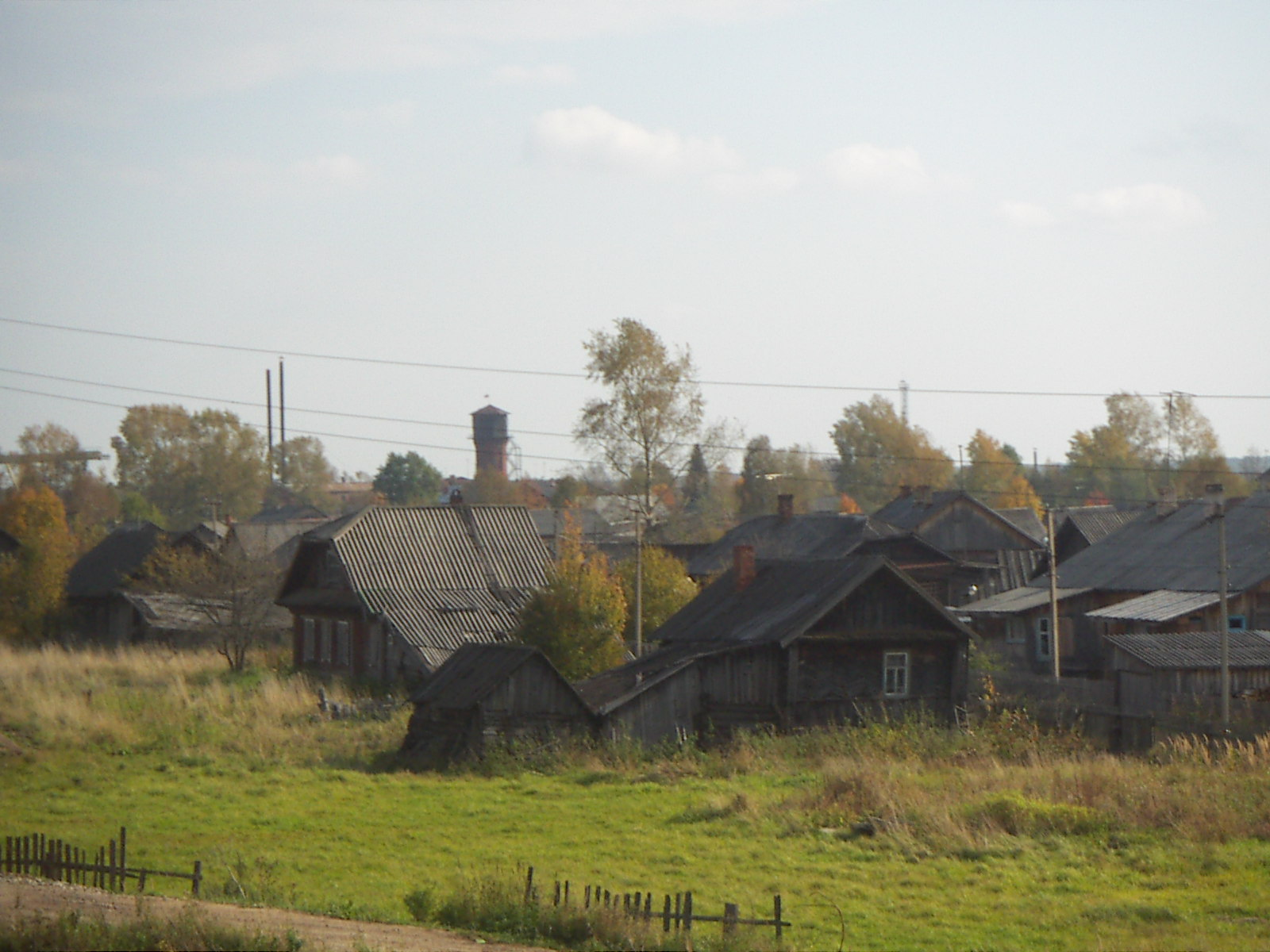
- Near Berezovka, Panozyrevsky District

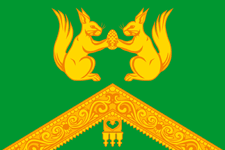
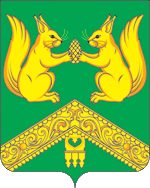
- Flag Coat of arms
- Location of Ponazyrevsky District in Kostroma Oblast
- Coordinates: 58°21′N 46°18′E
- Country: Russia
- Federal subject: Kostroma Oblast
- Established: 1945
- Administrative center: Ponazyrevo

Area
  - Total: 2,080 km^{2} (800 sq mi)

Population (2010 Census)
  - Total: 8,456
  - Density: 4.07/km^{2} (10.5/sq mi)
  - Urban: 57.2%
  - Rural: 42.8%

Administrative structure
  - Administrative divisions: 1 Urban settlements (urban-type settlements), 3 Settlements
  - Inhabited localities: 1 urban-type settlements, 35 rural localities

Municipal structure
  - Municipally incorporated as: Ponazyrevsky Municipal District
  - Municipal divisions: 1 urban settlements, 3 rural settlements
- Time zone: UTC+3 (MSK)
- OKTMO ID: 34636000
- Website: http://ponazyrevo.adm44.ru/index.aspx

Ponazyrevsky District (Russian: Пона́зыревский райо́н) is an administrative and municipal district (raion), one of the twenty-four in Kostroma Oblast, Russia. It is located in the east of the oblast. The area of the district is 2,080 square kilometers (800 sq mi). Its administrative center is the urban locality (an urban-type settlement) of Ponazyrevo. Population: 4,975 (2021 census); 8,456 (2010 census); 10,496 (2002 Census); 14,030 (1989 Soviet census). The population of Ponazyrevo accounts for 61.4% of the district's total population.
