= Nerekhtsky District =

Nerekhtsky District Нерехтский район (Russian)
- District
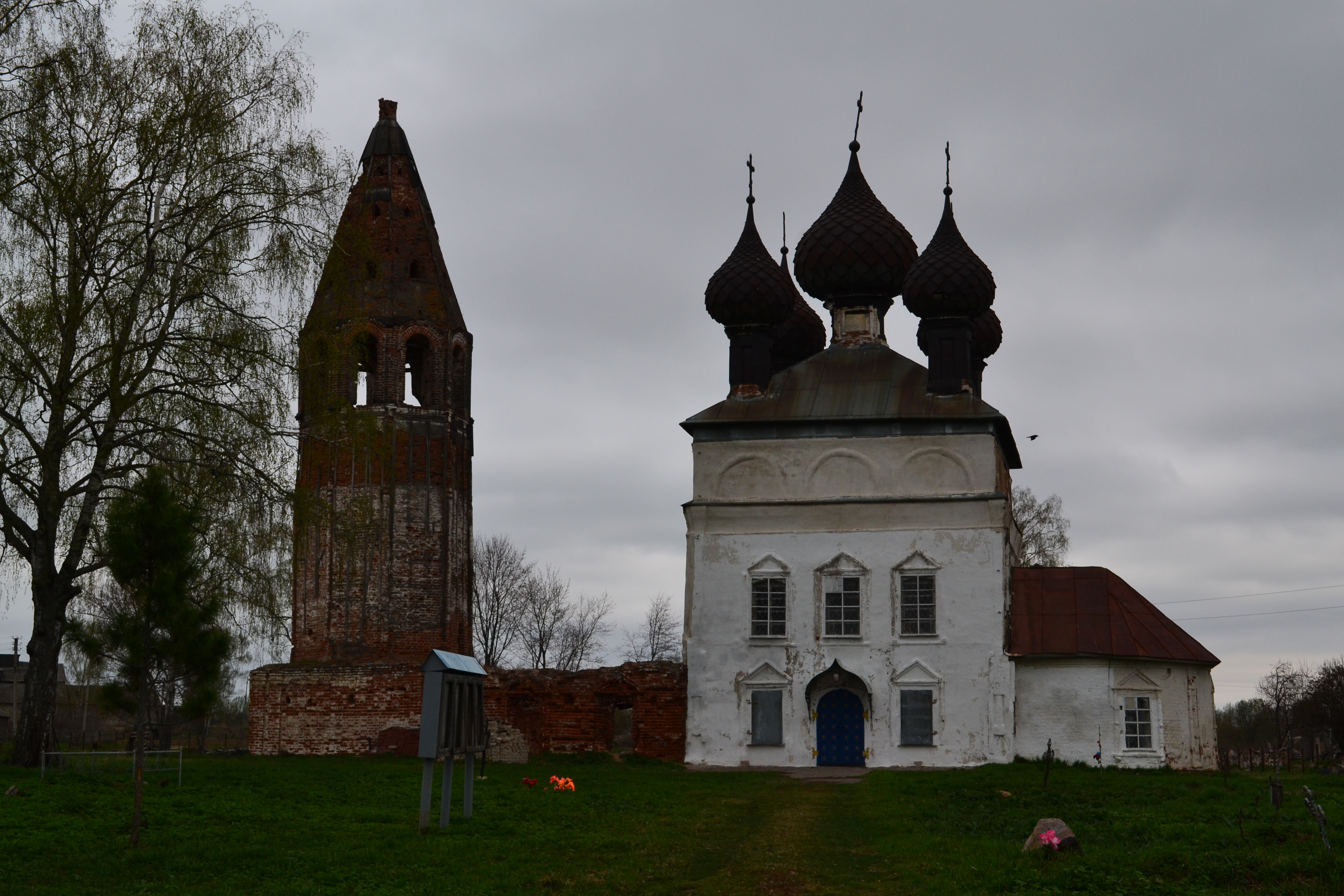
- Church of the Presentation Nikolaya, Nerekhtsky District

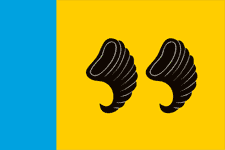
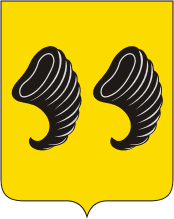
- Flag Coat of arms
- Location of Nerekhtsky District in Kostroma Oblast
- Coordinates: 57°27′N 40°35′E
- Country: Russia
- Federal subject: Kostroma Oblast
- Administrative center: Nerekhta

Area
  - Total: 1,163 km^{2} (449 sq mi)

Population (2010 Census)
  - Total: 11,416
  - Density: 9.816/km^{2} (25.42/sq mi)
  - Urban: 0%
  - Rural: 100%

Administrative structure
  - Administrative divisions: 4 Settlements
  - Inhabited localities: 160 rural localities

Municipal structure
  - Municipally incorporated as: Nerekhtsky Municipal District
  - Municipal divisions: 1 urban settlements, 4 rural settlements
- Time zone: UTC+3 (MSK)
- OKTMO ID: 34626000
- Website: http://admnerehta.ru/

Nerekhtsky District (Russian: Не́рехтский райо́н) is an administrative and municipal district (raion), one of the twenty-four in Kostroma Oblast, Russia. It is located in the west of the oblast. The area of the district is 1,163 square kilometers (449 sq mi). Its administrative center is the town of Nerekhta (which is not administratively a part of the district). Population: 29,270 (2021 census); 11,416 (2010 census); 13,447 (2002 Census); 15,393 (1989 Soviet census).

== Administrative and municipal status ==
Within the framework of administrative divisions, Nerekhtsky District is one of the twenty-four in the oblast. The town of Nerekhta serves as its administrative center, despite being incorporated separately as a town of oblast significance—an administrative unit with the status equal to that of the districts.

As a municipal division, the district is incorporated as Nerekhtsky Municipal District, with the town of oblast significance of Nerekhta being incorporated within it as Nerekhta Urban Settlement.
