= Manturovsky District, Kostroma Oblast =

Manturovsky District Мантуровский район (Russian)
- District
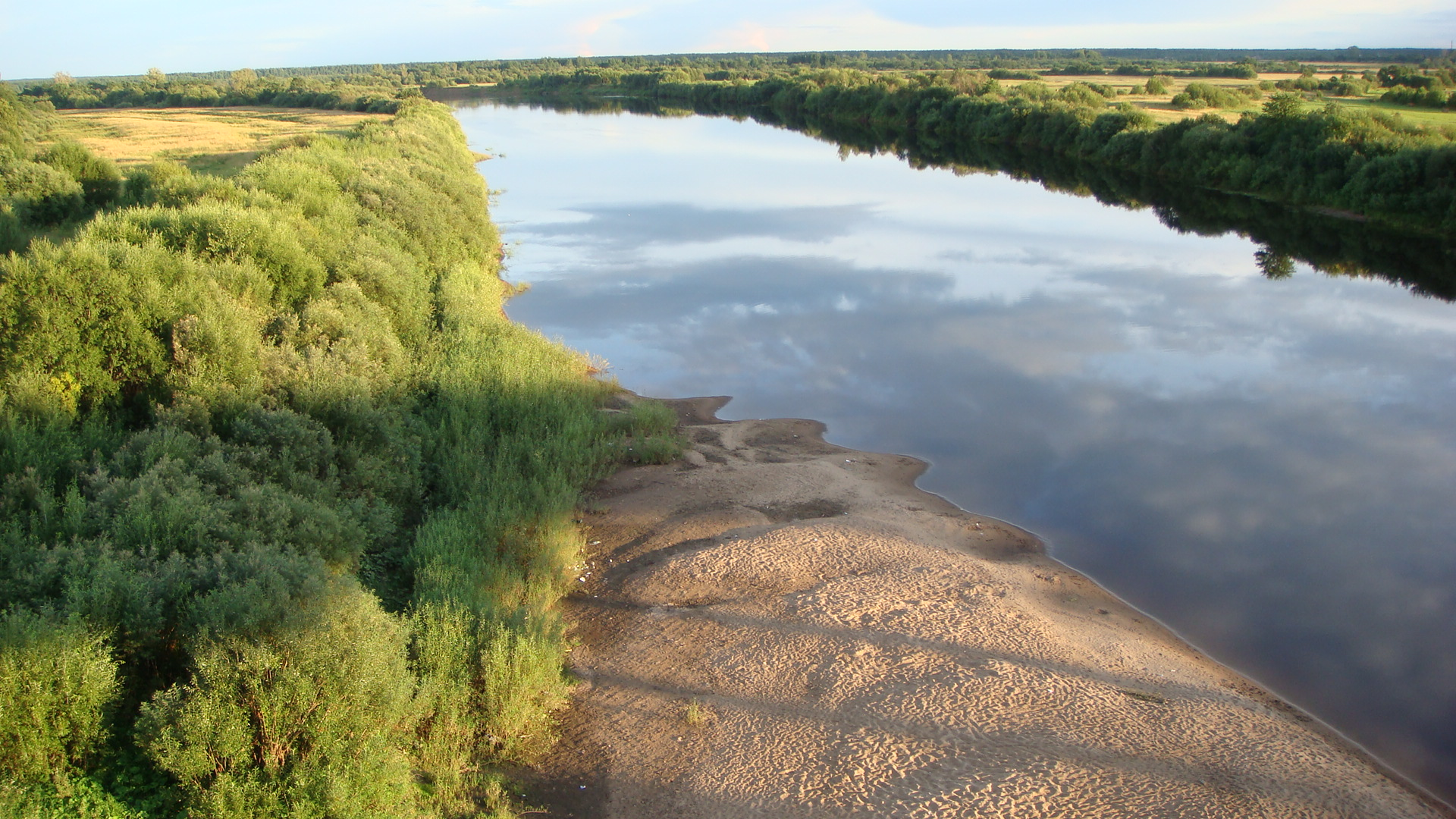
- Unzha River, on road to Sharyu, Manturovsky District

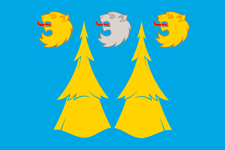
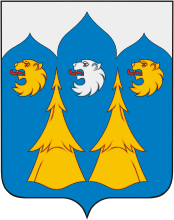
- Flag Coat of arms
- Location of Manturovsky District in Kostroma Oblast
- Coordinates: 58°20′N 44°46′E
- Country: Russia
- Federal subject: Kostroma Oblast
- Administrative center: Manturovo

Area
  - Total: 2,667 km^{2} (1,030 sq mi)

Population (2010 Census)
  - Total: 4,978
  - Density: 1.867/km^{2} (4.834/sq mi)
  - Urban: 0%
  - Rural: 100%

Administrative structure
  - Administrative divisions: 5 Settlements
  - Inhabited localities: 100 rural localities

Municipal structure
  - Municipally incorporated as: Manturovsky Municipal District
  - Municipal divisions: 0 urban settlements, 5 rural settlements
- Time zone: UTC+3 (MSK)
- OKTMO ID: 34620000
- Website: http://manraion.ru/

Manturovsky District (Russian: Ма́нтуровский райо́н) is an administrative and municipal district (raion), one of the twenty-four in Kostroma Oblast, Russia. It is located in the center of the oblast. The area of the district is 2,667 square kilometers (1,030 sq mi). Its administrative center is the town of Manturovo (which is not administratively a part of the district). Population: 4,978 (2010 census); 6,796 (2002 Census); 9,065 (1989 Soviet census).

== Administrative and municipal status ==
Within the framework of administrative divisions, Manturovsky District is one of the twenty-four in the oblast. The town of Manturovo serves as its administrative center, despite being incorporated separately as a town of oblast significance—an administrative unit with the status equal to that of the districts.

As a municipal division, the district is incorporated as Manturovsky Municipal District. The town of oblast significance of Manturovo is incorporated separately from the district as Manturovo Urban Okrug.
