= Makaryevsky District =

Makaryevsky District Макарьевский район (Russian)
- District
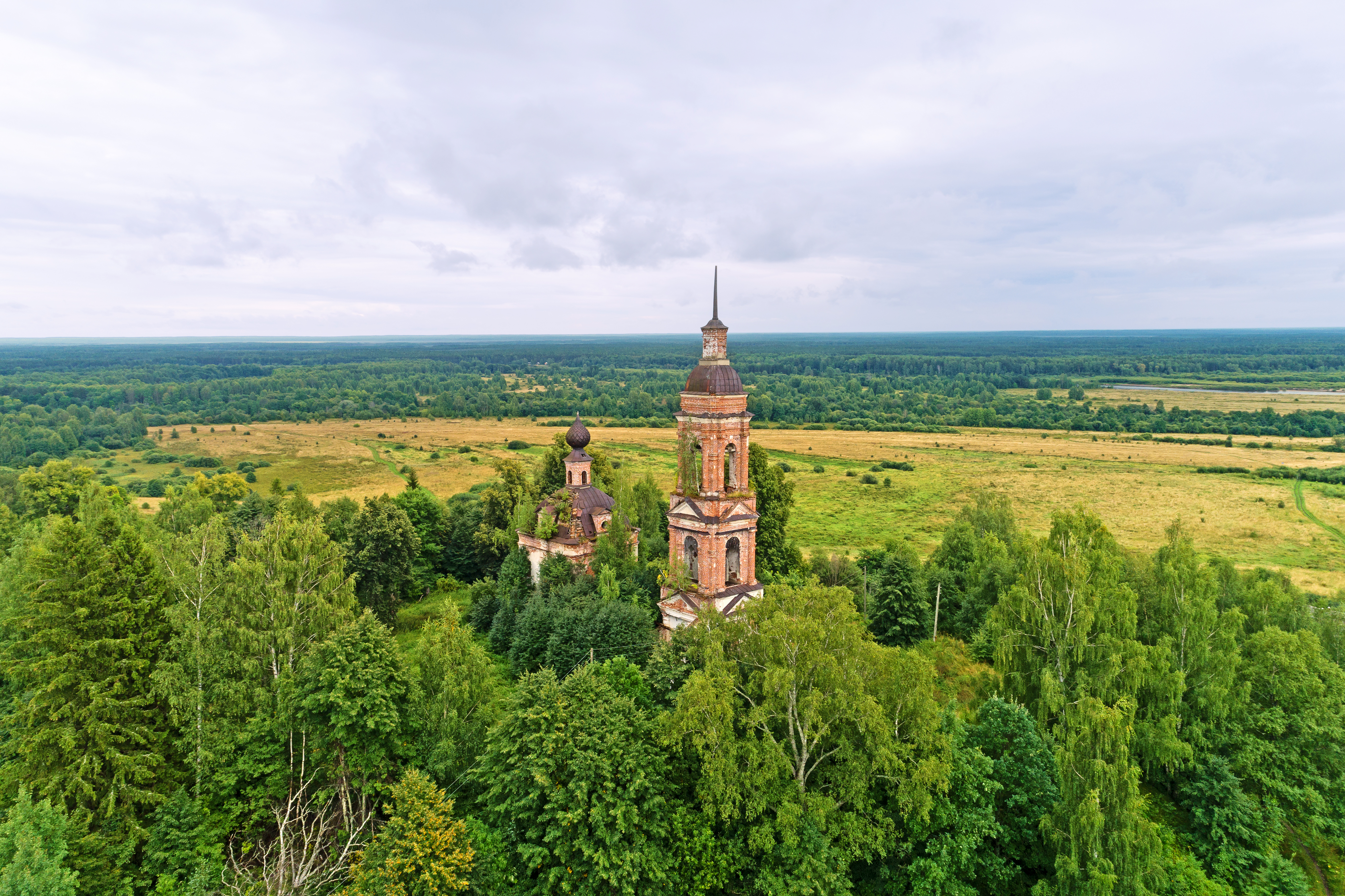
- Resurrection Church, Unzha

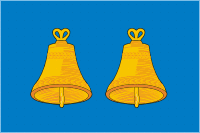
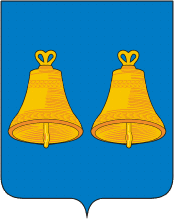
- Flag Coat of arms
- Location of Makaryevsky District in Kostroma Oblast
- Coordinates: 57°53′00″N 43°48′00″E
- Country: Russia
- Federal subject: Kostroma Oblast
- Established: 1 October 1929
- Administrative center: Makaryev

Area
  - Total: 4,850 km^{2} (1,870 sq mi)

Population (2010 Census)
  - Total: 15,968
  - Density: 3.29/km^{2} (8.53/sq mi)
  - Urban: 45.6%
  - Rural: 54.4%

Administrative structure
  - Administrative divisions: 1 Towns of district significance, 7 Settlements
  - Inhabited localities: 1 cities/towns, 140 rural localities

Municipal structure
  - Municipally incorporated as: Makaryevsky Municipal District
  - Municipal divisions: 1 urban settlements, 7 rural settlements
- Time zone: UTC+3 (MSK)
- OKTMO ID: 34618000
- Website: http://www.makariev.ru/

Makaryevsky District (Russian: Мака́рьевский райо́н) is an administrative and municipal district (raion), one of the twenty-four in Kostroma Oblast, Russia. It is located in the south of the oblast. The area of the district is 4,850 square kilometers (1,870 sq mi). Its administrative center is the town of Makaryev. Population: 10,424 (2021 census); 15,968 (2010 census); 19,523 (2002 Census); 24,900 (1989 Soviet census). The population of Makaryev accounts for 53.0% of the district's total population.
