= Sharya =

Town in Kostroma Oblast, Russia

Sharya Шарья
- Town
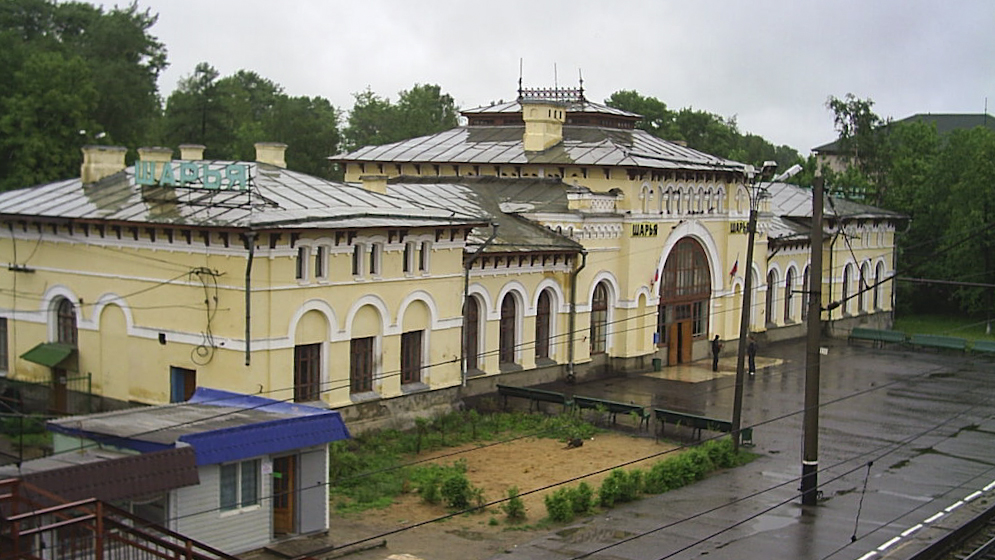
- Sharya railway station

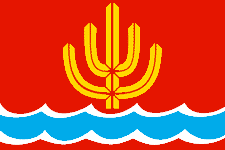
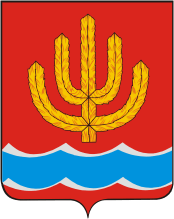
- Flag Coat of arms
- Interactive map of Sharya
- Location of Sharya Sharya (Kostroma Oblast)
- Coordinates: 58°22′N 45°30′E
- Country: Russia
- Federal subject: Kostroma Oblast
- Founded: 1906
- Town status since: 1938
- Elevation: 110 m (360 ft)

Population (2010 Census)
  - Total: 23,681
  - Estimate (2021): 20,439 (−13.7%)

Administrative status
  - Subordinated to: town of oblast significance of Sharya
  - Capital of: Sharyinsky District, town of oblast significance of Sharya

Municipal status
  - Urban okrug: Sharya Urban Okrug
  - Capital of: Sharya Urban Okrug, Sharyinsky Municipal District
- Time zone: UTC+3 (MSK)
- Postal codes: 157500, 157501, 157504, 157505, 157559
- Dialing code: +7 49449
- OKTMO ID: 34730000001
- Website: adm-sharya.ru

Sharya (Russian: Шарья́) is a town in Kostroma Oblast, Russia, located on the left bank of the Vetluga River, 330 kilometers (210 mi) northeast of Kostroma, the administrative center of the oblast.

Population: 20,439 (2021 census); 23,681 (2010 census); 24,900 (2002 census); 27,062 (1989 Soviet census); 26,000 (1974).

== History ==
It was founded in 1906 and granted town status in 1938.

== Administrative and municipal status ==
Within the framework of administrative divisions, Sharya serves as the administrative center of Sharyinsky District, despite not being part of it. As an administrative division, it is, together with the urban-type settlement of Vetluzhsky and three rural localities, incorporated separately as the town of oblast significance of Sharya—an administrative unit with the status equal to that of the districts. As a municipal division, the town of oblast significance of Sharya is incorporated as Sharya Urban Okrug.

== Twin towns and sister cities ==
Sharya has one sister city, as designated by Sister Cities International (SCI):

- Great Falls, Montana, United States
