= Kadyysky District =

Kadyysky District Кадыйский район (Russian)
- District
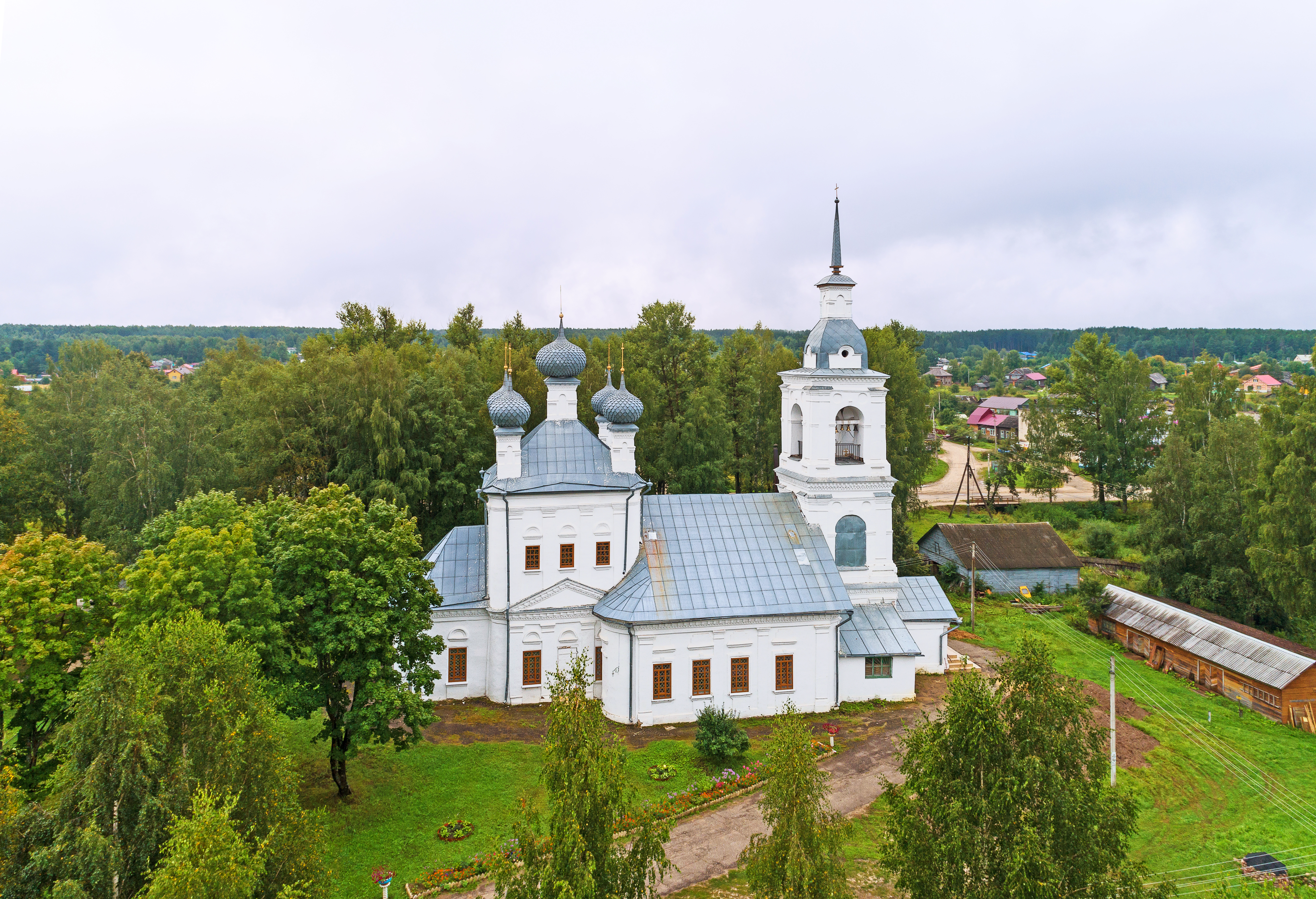
- Saint Nicholas Church in Kadyy

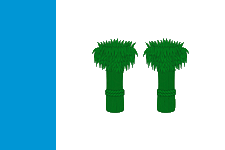
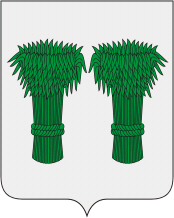
- Flag Coat of arms
- Location of Kadyysky District in Kostroma Oblast
- Coordinates: 57°46′51″N 43°11′18″E
- Country: Russia
- Federal subject: Kostroma Oblast
- Established: 25 January 1935
- Administrative center: Kadyy

Area
  - Total: 2,190 km^{2} (850 sq mi)

Population (2010 Census)
  - Total: 8,374
  - Density: 3.82/km^{2} (9.90/sq mi)
  - Urban: 43.0%
  - Rural: 57.0%

Administrative structure
  - Administrative divisions: 1 Urban settlements (urban-type settlements), 7 Settlements
  - Inhabited localities: 1 urban-type settlements, 95 rural localities

Municipal structure
  - Municipally incorporated as: Kadyysky Municipal District
  - Municipal divisions: 1 urban settlements, 7 rural settlements
- Time zone: UTC+3 (MSK)
- OKTMO ID: 34610000
- Website: http://admkad.ru/

Kadyysky District (Russian: Кады́йский райо́н) is an administrative and municipal district (raion), one of the twenty-four in Kostroma Oblast, Russia. It is located in the south of the oblast. The area of the district is 2,190 square kilometers (850 sq mi). Its administrative center is the urban locality (a settlement) of Kadyy. Population: 6,137 (2021 census); 8,374 (2010 census); 10,341 (2002 Census); 12,847 (1989 Soviet census). The population of Kadyy accounts for 50.5% of the district's total population.

== People ==
- Andrei Tarkovsky (1932–1986)
