= Neysky District =

Neysky District Нейский район (Russian)
- District
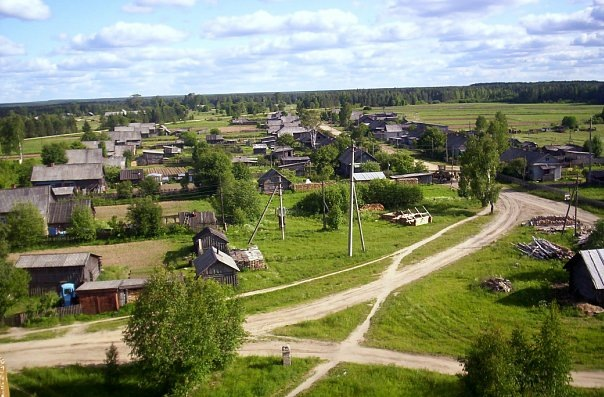
- Village of Kuzhbal, Neysky District

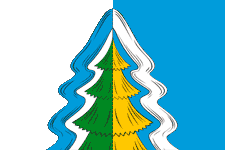
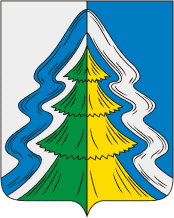
- Flag Coat of arms
- Location of Neysky District in Kostroma Oblast
- Coordinates: 58°17′N 43°52′E
- Country: Russia
- Federal subject: Kostroma Oblast
- Administrative center: Neya

Area
  - Total: 2,657 km^{2} (1,026 sq mi)

Population (2010 Census)
  - Total: 4,325
  - Density: 1.628/km^{2} (4.216/sq mi)
  - Urban: 0%
  - Rural: 100%

Administrative structure
  - Administrative divisions: 8 Settlements
  - Inhabited localities: 93 rural localities

Municipal structure
  - Municipally incorporated as: Neysky Municipal District
  - Municipal divisions: 1 urban settlements, 8 rural settlements
- Time zone: UTC+3 (MSK)
- OKTMO ID: 34624000
- Website: http://neya.info/

Neysky District (Russian: Не́йский райо́н) is an administrative and municipal district (raion), one of the twenty-four in Kostroma Oblast, Russia. It is located in the center of the oblast. The area of the district is 2,657 square kilometers (1,026 sq mi). Its administrative center is the town of Neya (which is not administratively a part of the district). Population: 4,325 (2010 census); 6,018 (2002 Census); 8,051 (1989 Soviet census).

== Administrative and municipal status ==
Within the framework of administrative divisions, Neysky District is one of the twenty-four in the oblast. The town of Neya serves as its administrative center, despite being incorporated separately as a town of oblast significance—an administrative unit with the status equal to that of the districts.

As a municipal division, the district is incorporated as Neysky Municipal District, with the town of oblast significance of Neya being incorporated within it as Neya Urban Settlement.
