= Sharyinsky District =

Administrative and municipal district in Kostroma Oblast, Russia

Sharyinsky District Шарьинский район (Russian)
- District
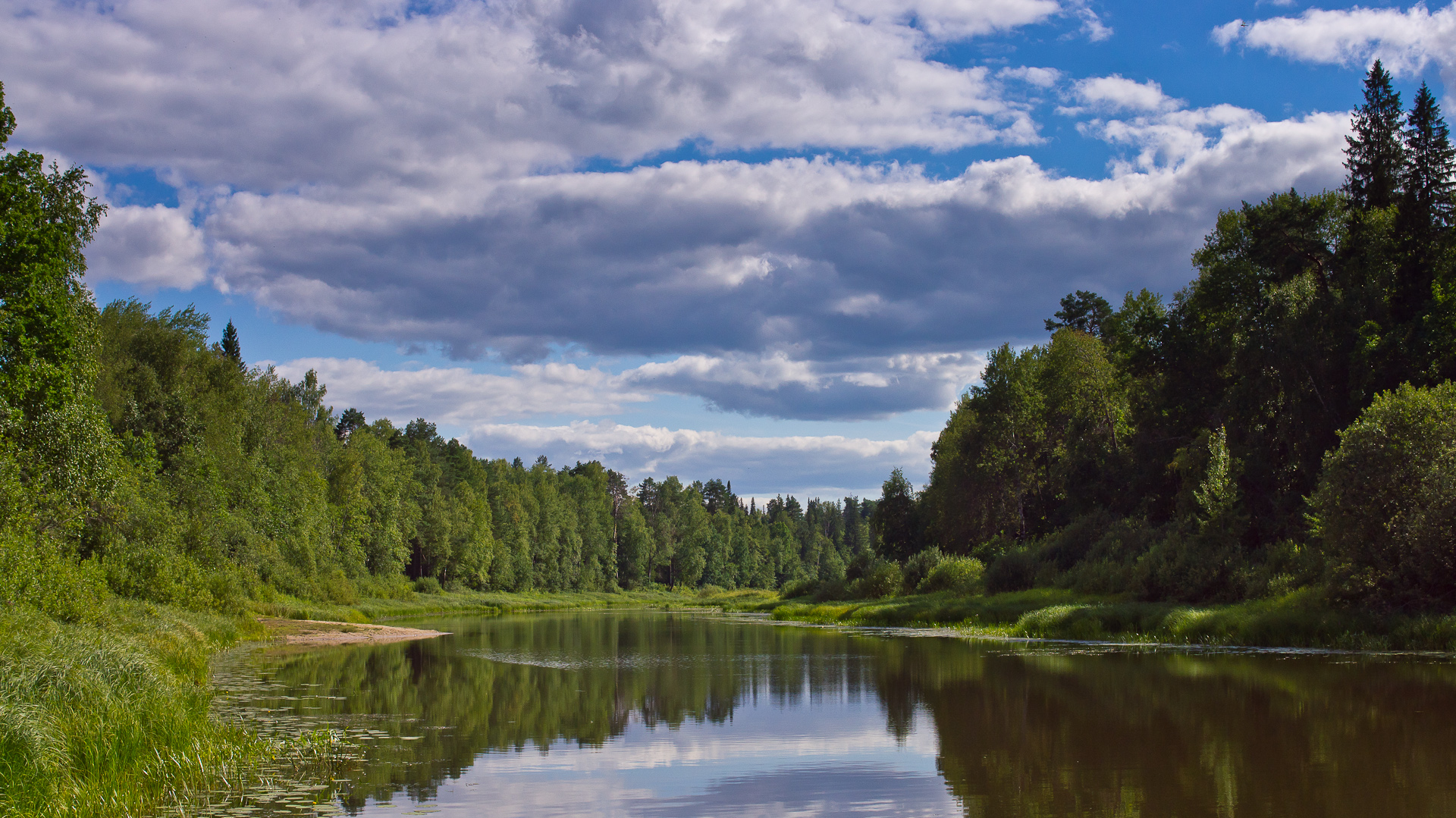
- Lake Kolmovo, Sharyinsky District

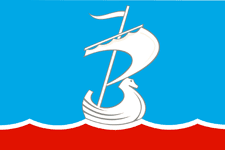
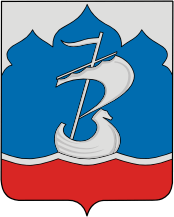
- Flag Coat of arms
- Location of Sharyinsky District in Kostroma Oblast
- Coordinates: 58°22′N 45°30′E
- Country: Russia
- Federal subject: Kostroma Oblast
- Administrative center: Sharya

Area
  - Total: 4,070 km^{2} (1,570 sq mi)

Population (2010 Census)
  - Total: 10,390
  - Density: 2.55/km^{2} (6.61/sq mi)
  - Urban: 0%
  - Rural: 100%

Administrative structure
  - Administrative divisions: 10 Settlements
  - Inhabited localities: 179 rural localities

Municipal structure
  - Municipally incorporated as: Sharyinsky Municipal District
  - Municipal divisions: 0 urban settlements, 10 rural settlements
- Time zone: UTC+3 (MSK)
- OKTMO ID: 34648000
- Website: http://www.admshmr.ru/index.php

Sharyinsky District (Russian: Шарьи́нский райо́н) is an administrative and municipal district (raion), one of the twenty-four in Kostroma Oblast, Russia. It is located in the southeast of the oblast. The area of the district is 4,070 square kilometers (1,570 sq mi). Its administrative center is the town of Sharya (which is not administratively a part of the district). Population: 7,522 (2021 census); 10,390 (2010 census); 12,851 (2002 Census); 16,458 (1989 Soviet census).

== Administrative and municipal status ==
Within the framework of administrative divisions, Sharyinsky District is one of the twenty-four in the oblast. The town of Sharya serves as its administrative center, despite being incorporated separately as a town of oblast significance—an administrative unit with the status equal to that of the districts.

As a municipal division, the district is incorporated as Sharyinsky Municipal District. The town of oblast significance of Sharya is incorporated separately from the district as Sharya Urban Okrug.
