= Buysky District =

Buysky District Буйский район (Russian)
- District
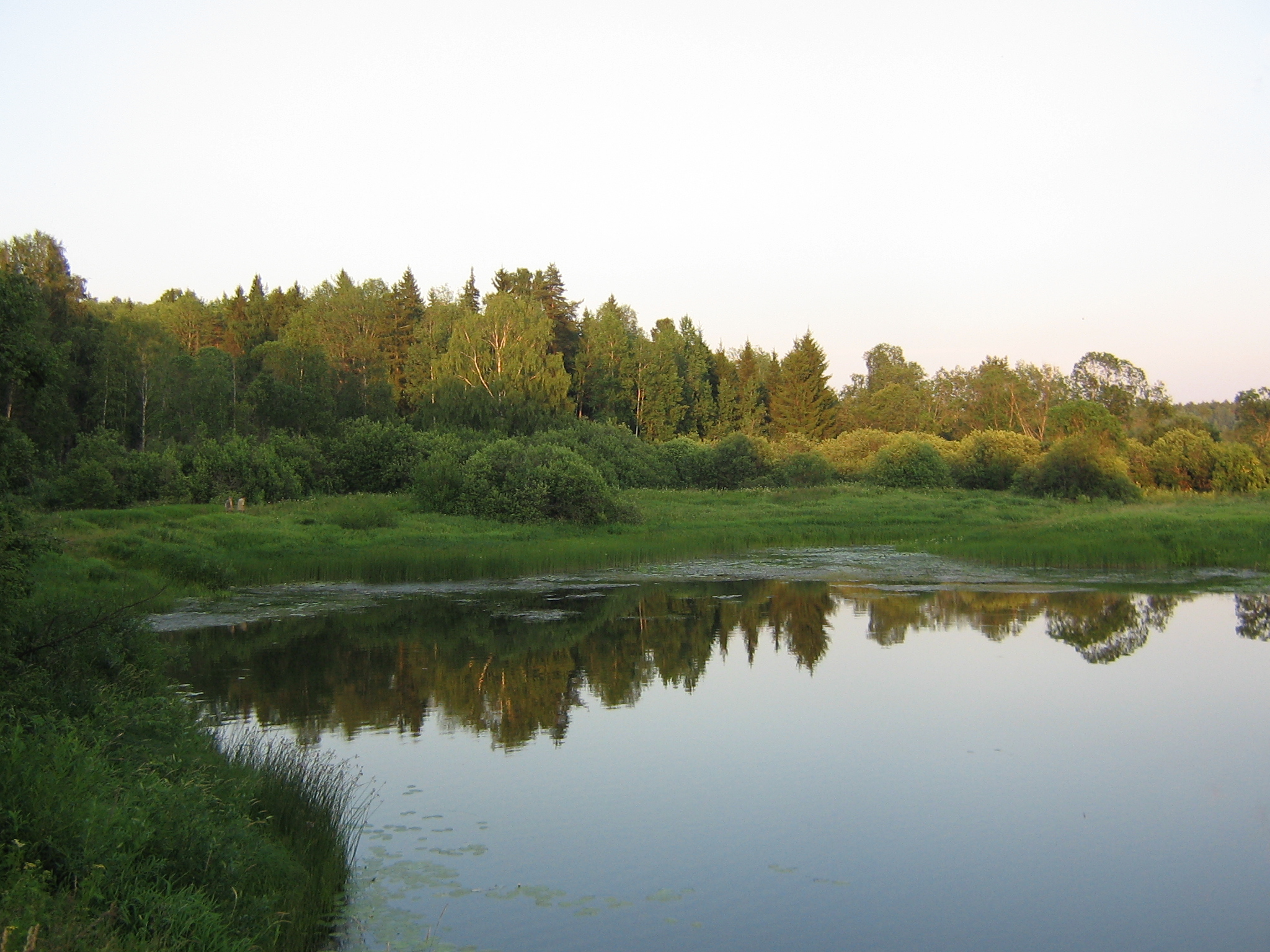
- Tebza River, Buysky District

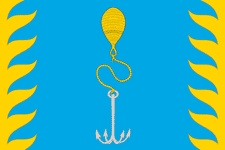
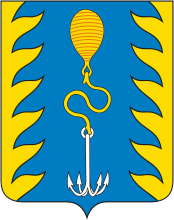
- Flag Coat of arms
- Location of Buysky District in Kostroma Oblast
- Coordinates: 58°29′N 41°32′E
- Country: Russia
- Federal subject: Kostroma Oblast
- Administrative center: Buy

Area
  - Total: 3,248 km^{2} (1,254 sq mi)

Population (2010 Census)
  - Total: 11,829
  - Density: 3.642/km^{2} (9.433/sq mi)
  - Urban: 40.5%
  - Rural: 59.5%

Administrative structure
  - Administrative divisions: 1 Urban settlements (urban-type settlements), 2 Settlements
  - Inhabited localities: 1 urban-type settlements, 260 rural localities

Municipal structure
  - Municipally incorporated as: Buysky Municipal District
  - Municipal divisions: 1 urban settlements, 2 rural settlements
- Time zone: UTC+3 (MSK)
- OKTMO ID: 34604000
- Website: http://bmr44.ru/

Buysky District (Russian: Бу́йский райо́н) is an administrative and municipal district (raion), one of the twenty-four in Kostroma Oblast, Russia. It is located in the west of the oblast. The area of the district is 3,248 square kilometers (1,254 sq mi). Its administrative center is the town of Buy (which is not administratively a part of the district). Population: 9,035 (2021 census); 11,829 (2010 census); 8,847 (2002 Census); 11,737 (1989 Soviet census).

== Administrative and municipal status ==
Within the framework of administrative divisions, Buysky District is one of the twenty-four in the oblast. The town of Buy serves as its administrative center, despite being incorporated separately as a town of oblast significance—an administrative unit with the status equal to that of the districts.

As a municipal division, the district is incorporated as Buysky Municipal District. The town of oblast significance of Buy is incorporated separately from the district as Buy Urban Okrug.
