= Putilovo =

Putilovo (Russian: Путилово) is the name of several rural localities in Russia:

- Putilovo, Kaliningrad Oblast, a settlement in Krasnotorovsky Rural Okrug of Zelenogradsky District of Kaliningrad Oblast
- Putilovo, Leningrad Oblast, a slobodka in Putilovskoye Settlement Municipal Formation of Kirovsky District of Leningrad Oblast
- Putilovo, Moscow Oblast, a selo in Tsarevskoye Rural Settlement of Pushkinsky District of Moscow Oblast
- Putilovo, Novosokolnichesky District, Pskov Oblast, a village in Novosokolnichesky District, Pskov Oblast
- Putilovo, Porkhovsky District, Pskov Oblast, a village in Porkhovsky District, Pskov Oblast
- Putilovo, Kalininsky District, Tver Oblast, a village in Krasnogorskoye Rural Settlement of Kalininsky District of Tver Oblast
- Putilovo, Kashinsky District, Tver Oblast, a village in Pisyakovskoye Rural Settlement of Kashinsky District of Tver Oblast
- Putilovo, Krasnokholmsky District, Tver Oblast, a village in Vysokushinskoye Rural Settlement of Krasnokholmsky District of Tver Oblast
- Putilovo, Sandovsky District, Tver Oblast, a village in Lukinskoye Rural Settlement of Sandovsky District of Tver Oblast
- Putilovo, Vladimir Oblast, a village in Alexandrovsky District of Vladimir Oblast
- Putilovo, Gryazovetsky District, Vologda Oblast, a village in Vokhtogsky Selsoviet of Gryazovetsky District of Vologda Oblast
- Putilovo, Nikolsky District, Vologda Oblast, a village in Nizhnekemsky Selsoviet of Nikolsky District of Vologda Oblast
- Putilovo, Yaroslavl Oblast, a village in Stoginsky Rural Okrug of Gavrilov-Yamsky District of Yaroslavl Oblast
