= Klenovaya =

Klenovaya Кленовая
- Village
- Location within Vologda Oblast Location within Russia
- Coordinates: 59°37′N 44°58′E
- Country: Russia
- Region: Vologda Oblast
- District: Nikolsky District
- Time zone: UTC+3:00

Klenovaya (Russian: Кленовая) is a rural locality (a village) in Krasnopolyanskoye Rural Settlement, Nikolsky District, Vologda Oblast, Russia. As of 2002, the village has a population of 12.

Klenovaya is located 41 km northwest of Nikolsk (the district's administrative centre) by road. Pertyug is the nearest rural locality.
