= Argunovo =

Argunovo (Russian: Аргуново) is the name of several rural localities in Russia:

- Argunovo, Kaluga Oblast, a village under the administrative jurisdiction of the city of Kaluga, Kaluga Oblast
- Argunovo, Ramensky District, Moscow Oblast, a village in Ulyaninskoye Rural Settlement of Ramensky District of Moscow Oblast
- Argunovo, Voskresensky District, Moscow Oblast, a village in Fedinskoye Rural Settlement of Voskresensky District of Moscow Oblast
- Argunovo, Zaraysky District, Moscow Oblast, a village in Mashonovskoye Rural Settlement of Zaraysky District of Moscow Oblast
- Argunovo, Kirillovsky District, Vologda Oblast, a village in Nikolo-Torzhsky Selsoviet of Kirillovsky District of Vologda Oblast
- Argunovo, Nikolsky District, Vologda Oblast, a village in Argunovsky Selsoviet of Nikolsky District of Vologda Oblast
