= Yermakovo, Nikolsky District, Vologda Oblast =

Yermakovo Ермаково
- Village
- Location within Vologda Oblast Location within Russia
- Coordinates: 59°25′N 45°50′E
- Country: Russia
- Region: Vologda Oblast
- District: Nikolsky District
- Time zone: UTC+3:00

Yermakovo (Russian: Ермаково) is a rural locality (a village) in Zavrazhskoye Rural Settlement, Nikolsky District, Vologda Oblast, Russia. The population was 128 as of 2002.

== Geography ==
Yermakovo is located 32 km southeast of Nikolsk (the district's administrative centre) by road. Zavrazhye is the nearest rural locality.
