= Brodovitsa =

Brodovitsa Бродовица
- Village
- Location within Vologda Oblast Location within Russia
- Coordinates: 59°18′N 45°37′E
- Country: Russia
- Region: Vologda Oblast
- District: Nikolsky District
- Time zone: UTC+3:00

Brodovitsa (Russian: Бродовица) is a rural locality (a village) in Permasskoye Rural Settlement, Nikolsky District, Vologda Oblast, Russia. The population was 14 as of 2002.

== Geography ==
Brodovitsa is located 30 km southeast of Nikolsk (the district's administrative centre) by road. Berezovo is the nearest rural locality.
