= Filinsky =

Filinsky Филинский
- Village
- Location within Vologda Oblast Location within Russia
- Coordinates: 59°42′N 45°10′E
- Country: Russia
- Region: Vologda Oblast
- District: Nikolsky District
- Time zone: UTC+3:00

Filinsky (Russian: Филинский) is a rural locality (a village) in Niginskoye Rural Settlement, Nikolsky District, Vologda Oblast, Russia. The population was 108 as of 2002.

== Geography ==
The distance to Nikolsk is 28 km, to Nigino is 10 km. Kamenny is the nearest rural locality.
