= Cherntsovo =

Cherntsovo Чернцово
- Village
- Location within Vologda Oblast Location within Russia
- Coordinates: 59°52′N 45°03′E
- Country: Russia
- Region: Vologda Oblast
- District: Nikolsky District
- Time zone: UTC+3:00

Cherntsovo (Russian: Чернцово) is a rural locality (a village) in Argunovskoye Rural Settlement, Nikolsky District, Vologda Oblast, Russia. The population was 138 as of 2002.

== Geography ==
Cherntsovo is located 50 km northwest of Nikolsk (the district's administrative centre) by road. Syrkovo is the nearest rural locality.
