= Nizhny Rystyug =

Nizhny Rystyug Нижний Рыстюг
- Village
- Location within Vologda Oblast Location within Russia
- Coordinates: 59°35′N 45°28′E
- Country: Russia
- Region: Vologda Oblast
- District: Nikolsky District
- Time zone: UTC+3:00

Nizhny Rystyug (Russian: Нижний Рыстюг) is a rural locality (a village) in Krasnopolyanskoye Rural Settlement, Nikolsky District, Vologda Oblast, Russia. The population was 25 as of 2002.

== Geography ==
Nizhny Rystyug is located 12 km northeast of Nikolsk (the district's administrative centre) by road. Zhivotovo is the nearest rural locality.
