= Maloye Fomino =

Maloye Fomino Малое Фомино
- Village
- Location within Vologda Oblast Location within Russia
- Coordinates: 59°33′N 45°33′E
- Country: Russia
- Region: Vologda Oblast
- District: Nikolsky District
- Time zone: UTC+3:00

Maloye Fomino (Russian: Малое Фомино) is a rural locality (a village) in Krasnopolyanskoye Rural Settlement, Nikolsky District, Vologda Oblast, Russia. The population was 23 as of 2002.

== Geography ==
Maloye Fomino is located 7 km northeast of Nikolsk (the district's administrative centre) by road. Irdanovo is the nearest rural locality.
