= Vsemirskaya =

Vsemirskaya Всемирская
- Village
- Location within Vologda Oblast Location within Russia
- Coordinates: 59°35′N 44°34′E
- Country: Russia
- Region: Vologda Oblast
- District: Nikolsky District
- Time zone: UTC+3:00

Vsemirskaya (Russian: Всемирская) is a rural locality (a village) in Kemskoye Rural Settlement, Nikolsky District, Vologda Oblast, Russia. The population was 1 as of 2002.

== Geography ==
Vsemirskaya is located 64 km northwest of Nikolsk (the district's administrative centre) by road. Makarovsky is the nearest rural locality.
