= Kamennoye, Vologda Oblast =

Kamennoye Каменное
- Village
- Location within Vologda Oblast Location within Russia
- Coordinates: 59°45′N 45°05′E
- Country: Russia
- Region: Vologda Oblast
- District: Nikolsky District
- Time zone: UTC+3:00

Kamennoye (Russian: Каменное) is a rural locality (a village) in Vakhnevskoye Rural Settlement, Nikolsky District, Vologda Oblast, Russia. The population was 99 as of 2002.

== Geography ==
The distance to Nikolsk is 43 km, to Vakhnevo is 5 km. Kotelnoye is the nearest rural locality.
