= Dyachkovo =

Dyachkovo Дьячково
- Village
- Location within Vologda Oblast Location within Russia
- Coordinates: 59°50′N 45°07′E
- Country: Russia
- Region: Vologda Oblast
- District: Nikolsky District
- Time zone: UTC+3:00

Dyachkovo (Russian: Дьячково) is a rural locality (a village) in Argunovskoye Rural Settlement, Nikolsky District, Vologda Oblast, Russia. The population was 52 as of 2002.

== Geography ==
Dyachkovo is located 45 km northwest of Nikolsk (the district's administrative centre) by road. Sofronovo is the nearest rural locality.
