= Lyulkovo =

Lyulkovo Люльково
- Village
- Location within Vologda Oblast Location within Russia
- Coordinates: 59°53′N 44°56′E
- Country: Russia
- Region: Vologda Oblast
- District: Nikolsky District
- Time zone: UTC+3:00

Lyulkovo (Russian: Люльково) is a rural locality (a village) in Zelentsovskoye Rural Settlement, Nikolsky District, Vologda Oblast, Russia. The population was 190 as of 2002.

== Geography ==
Lyulkovo is located 57 km northwest of Nikolsk (the district's administrative centre) by road. Sluda is the nearest rural locality.
