= Skomoroshye =

Skomoroshye Скоморошье
- Village
- Location within Vologda Oblast Location within Russia
- Coordinates: 59°51′N 45°10′E
- Country: Russia
- Region: Vologda Oblast
- District: Nikolsky District
- Time zone: UTC+3:00

Skomoroshye (Russian: Скоморошье) is a rural locality (a village) in Argunovskoye Rural Settlement, Nikolsky District, Vologda Oblast, Russia. The population was 94 as of 2002.

== Geography ==
Skomoroshye is located 48 km northwest of Nikolsk (the district's administrative centre) by road. Nikolskoye is the nearest rural locality.
