= Chernino =

Chernino Чернино
- Village
- Location within Vologda Oblast Location within Russia
- Coordinates: 59°48′N 45°09′E
- Country: Russia
- Region: Vologda Oblast
- District: Nikolsky District
- Time zone: UTC+3:00

Chernino (Russian: Чернино) is a rural locality (a village) in Vakhnevskoye Rural Settlement, Nikolsky District, Vologda Oblast, Russia. The population was 137 as of 2002.

== Geography ==
Chernino is located 40 km northwest of Nikolsk (the district's administrative centre) by road. Yesipovo is the nearest rural locality.
