= Maloye Sverchkovo =

Maloye Sverchkovo Малое Сверчково
- Village
- Location within Vologda Oblast Location within Russia
- Coordinates: 59°15′N 45°48′E
- Country: Russia
- Region: Vologda Oblast
- District: Nikolsky District
- Time zone: UTC+3:00

Maloye Sverchkovo (Russian: Малое Сверчково) is a rural locality (a village) in Permasskoye Rural Settlement, Nikolsky District, Vologda Oblast, Russia. The population was 10 as of 2002.

== Geography ==
Maloye Sverchkovo is located 45 km southeast of Nikolsk (the district's administrative centre) by road. Bolshoye Sverchkovo is the nearest rural locality.
