= Kudangsky =

Kudangsky Кудангский
- Settlement
- Location within Vologda Oblast Location within Russia
- Coordinates: 59°17′N 45°22′E
- Country: Russia
- Region: Vologda Oblast
- District: Nikolsky District
- Time zone: UTC+3:00

Kudangsky (Russian: Кудангский) is a rural locality (a settlement) in Permasskoye Rural Settlement, Nikolsky District, Vologda Oblast, Russia. The population was 276 as of 2010.

== Geography ==
Kudangsky is located 46 km south of Nikolsk (the district's administrative centre) by road. Gorokhovsky is the nearest rural locality.
