= Orlovo, Nikolsky District, Vologda Oblast =

Orlovo Орлово
- Village
- Location within Vologda Oblast Location within Russia
- Coordinates: 59°46′N 44°53′E
- Country: Russia
- Region: Vologda Oblast
- District: Nikolsky District
- Time zone: UTC+3:00

Orlovo (Russian: Орлово) is a rural locality (a village) in Vakhnevskoye Rural Settlement, Nikolsky District, Vologda Oblast, Russia. The population was 35 as of 2002.

== Geography ==
Orlovo is located 55 km northwest of Nikolsk (the district's administrative centre) by road. Osinovaya Gar is the nearest rural locality.
