= Dunilovsky =

Dunilovsky Дуниловский
- Settlement
- Location within Vologda Oblast Location within Russia
- Coordinates: 59°19′N 45°51′E
- Country: Russia
- Region: Vologda Oblast
- District: Nikolsky District
- Time zone: UTC+3:00

Dunilovsky (Russian: Дуниловский) is a rural locality (a settlement) in Zavrazhskoye Rural Settlement, Nikolsky District, Vologda Oblast, Russia. The population was 500 as of 2010. There are 13 streets.

== Geography ==
Dunilovsky is located 37 km southeast of Nikolsk (the district's administrative centre) by road. Dunilovo is the nearest rural locality.
