= Sokolovo, Nikolsky District, Vologda Oblast =

Sokolovo Соколово
- Village
- Location within Vologda Oblast Location within Russia
- Coordinates: 59°33′N 45°25′E
- Country: Russia
- Region: Vologda Oblast
- District: Nikolsky District
- Time zone: UTC+3:00

Sokolovo (Russian: Соколово) is a rural locality (a village) in Krasnopolyanskoye Rural Settlement, Nikolsky District, Vologda Oblast, Russia. The population was 53 as of 2002.

== Geography ==
Sokolovo is located 5 km northwest of Nikolsk (the district's administrative centre) by road. Aksentyevo is the nearest rural locality.
