= Chegodayevsky =

Chegodayevsky Чегодаевский
- Settlement
- Location within Vologda Oblast Location within Russia
- Coordinates: 59°27′N 46°01′E
- Country: Russia
- Region: Vologda Oblast
- District: Nikolsky District
- Time zone: UTC+3:00

Chegodayevsky (Russian: Чегодаевский) is a rural locality (a settlement) in Zavrazhskoye Rural Settlement, Nikolsky District, Vologda Oblast, Russia. The population was 7 as of 2002.

== Geography ==
Chegodayevsky is located 39 km (24 mi) southeast of Nikolsk (the district's administrative centre) by road. Vysokinsky is the nearest rural locality.
