= Yushkovo, Nikolsky District, Vologda Oblast =

Yushkovo Юшково
- Village
- Location within Vologda Oblast Location within Russia
- Coordinates: 59°46′N 45°10′E
- Country: Russia
- Region: Vologda Oblast
- District: Nikolsky District
- Time zone: UTC+3:00

Yushkovo (Russian: Юшково) is a rural locality (a village) in Vakhnevskoye Rural Settlement, Nikolsky District, Vologda Oblast, Russia. The population was 194 as of 2002.

== Geography ==
Yushkovo is located 36 km northwest of Nikolsk (the district's administrative centre) by road. Podgorye is the nearest rural locality.
