= Starina, Nikolsky District, Vologda Oblast =

Starina Старина
- Village
- Location within Vologda Oblast Location within Russia
- Coordinates: 59°35′N 44°41′E
- Country: Russia
- Region: Vologda Oblast
- District: Nikolsky District
- Time zone: UTC+3:00

Starina (Russian: Старина) is a rural locality (a village) in Kemskoye Rural Settlement, Nikolsky District, Vologda Oblast, Russia. The population was 77 as of 2002.

== Geography ==
Starina is located 60 km west of Nikolsk (the district's administrative centre) by road. Kostylevo is the nearest rural locality.
