= Milofanovo =

Milofanovo Милофаново
- Village
- Location within Vologda Oblast Location within Russia
- Coordinates: 59°54′N 44°55′E
- Country: Russia
- Region: Vologda Oblast
- District: Nikolsky District
- Time zone: UTC+3:00

Milofanovo (Russian: Милофаново) is a rural locality (a village) in Zelentsovskoye Rural Settlement, Nikolsky District, Vologda Oblast, Russia. The population was 131 as of 2002.

== Geography ==
Milofanovo is located 59 km northwest of Nikolsk (the district's administrative centre) by road. Senino is the nearest rural locality.
