= Shalashnevo =

Shalashnevo Шалашнево
- Village
- Location within Vologda Oblast Location within Russia
- Coordinates: 59°35′N 45°34′E
- Country: Russia
- Region: Vologda Oblast
- District: Nikolsky District
- Time zone: UTC+3:00

Shalashnevo (Russian: Шалашнево) is a rural locality (a village) in Baydarovskoye Rural Settlement, Nikolsky District, Vologda Oblast, Russia. The population was 26 as of 2002.

== Geography ==
Shalashnevo is located 15 km northeast of Nikolsk (the district's administrative centre) by road. Petryayevo is the nearest rural locality.
