= Krivodeyevo =

Krivodeyevo Криводеево
- Village
- Location within Vologda Oblast Location within Russia
- Coordinates: 59°31′N 45°29′E
- Country: Russia
- Region: Vologda Oblast
- District: Nikolsky District
- Time zone: UTC+3:00

Krivodeyevo (Russian: Криводеево) is a rural locality (a village) in Krasnopolyanskoye Rural Settlement, Nikolsky District, Vologda Oblast, Russia. The population was 281 as of 2002.

== Geography ==
Krivodeyevo is located 2 km east of Nikolsk (the district's administrative centre) by road. Nikolsk is the nearest rural locality.
