= Vyrypayevo =

Vyrypayevo Вырыпаево
- Village
- Location within Vologda Oblast Location within Russia
- Coordinates: 59°40′N 45°21′E
- Country: Russia
- Region: Vologda Oblast
- District: Nikolsky District
- Time zone: UTC+3:00

Vyrypayevo (Russian: Вырыпаево) is a rural locality (a village) in Terebayevskoye Rural Settlement, Nikolsky District, Vologda Oblast, Russia. The population was 38 as of 2002.

== Geography ==
Vyrypayevo is located 21 km north of Nikolsk (the district's administrative centre) by road. Podol is the nearest rural locality.
