= Turino, Vologda Oblast =

Turino Турино
- Village
- Location within Vologda Oblast Location within Russia
- Coordinates: 59°47′N 45°10′E
- Country: Russia
- Region: Vologda Oblast
- District: Nikolsky District
- Time zone: UTC+3:00

Turino (Russian: Турино) is a rural locality (a village) in Vakhnevskoye Rural Settlement, Nikolsky District, Vologda Oblast, Russia. The population was 35 as of 2002.

== Geography ==
Turino is located 38 km northwest of Nikolsk (the district's administrative centre) by road. Vakhnevo is the nearest rural locality.
