= Nigino =

Nigino Нигино
- Village
- Location within Vologda Oblast Location within Russia
- Coordinates: 59°39′N 45°16′E
- Country: Russia
- Region: Vologda Oblast
- District: Nikolsky District
- Time zone: UTC+3:00

Nigino (Russian: Нигино) is a rural locality (a village) and the administrative center of Niginskoye Rural Settlement, Nikolsky District, Vologda Oblast, Russia. The population was 399 as of 2002. There are 13 streets.

== Geography ==
Nigino is located 19 km northwest of Nikolsk (the district's administrative centre) by road. Lashovo is the nearest rural locality.
