= Petryayevo, Nikolsky District, Vologda Oblast =

Petryayevo Петряево
- Village
- Location within Vologda Oblast Location within Russia
- Coordinates: 59°36′N 45°33′E
- Country: Russia
- Region: Vologda Oblast
- District: Nikolsky District
- Time zone: UTC+3:00

Petryayevo (Russian: Петряево) is a rural locality (a village) in Baydarovskoye Rural Settlement, Nikolsky District, Vologda Oblast, Russia. The population was 29 as of 2002.

== Geography ==
Petryayevo is located 13 km northeast of Nikolsk (the district's administrative centre) by road. Shalashnevo is the nearest rural locality.
