= Svetly Klyuch =

Svetly Klyuch Светлый Ключ
- Selo
- Location within Vologda Oblast Location within Russia
- Coordinates: 59°30′N 45°27′E
- Country: Russia
- Region: Vologda Oblast
- District: Nikolsky District
- Time zone: UTC+3:00

Svetly Klyuch (Russian: Светлый Ключ) is a rural locality (a selo) in Krasnopolyanskoye Rural Settlement, Nikolsky District, Vologda Oblast, Russia. The population was 88 as of 2010. There are 3 streets.

== Geography ==
The distance to Nikolsk is 5 km.
