= Zemtsovo =

Zemtsovo Земцово
- Village
- Location within Vologda Oblast Location within Russia
- Coordinates: 59°27′N 44°46′E
- Country: Russia
- Region: Vologda Oblast
- District: Nikolsky District
- Time zone: UTC+3:00

Zemtsovo (Russian: Земцово) is a rural locality (a village) in Kemskoye Rural Settlement, Nikolsky District, Vologda Oblast, Russia. The population was 2 as of 2002.

== Geography ==
Zemtsovo is located 48 km southwest of Nikolsk (the district's administrative centre) by road. Kaino is the nearest rural locality.
