= Kumbiser =

Kumbiser Кумбисер
- Village
- Location within Vologda Oblast Location within Russia
- Coordinates: 59°36′N 45°39′E
- Country: Russia
- Region: Vologda Oblast
- District: Nikolsky District
- Time zone: UTC+3:00

Kumbiser (Russian: Кумбисер) is a rural locality (a village) in Baydarovskoye Rural Settlement, Nikolsky District, Vologda Oblast, Russia. The population was 77 as of 2002. There are 2 streets.

== Geography ==
Kumbiser is located 15 km northeast of Nikolsk (the district's administrative centre) by road. Krivyatskoye is the nearest rural locality.
