= Kipshenga =

Kipshenga Кипшеньга
- Village
- Location within Vologda Oblast Location within Russia
- Coordinates: 59°41′N 45°21′E
- Country: Russia
- Region: Vologda Oblast
- District: Nikolsky District
- Time zone: UTC+3:00

Kipshenga (Russian: Кипшеньга) is a rural locality (a village) in Terebayevskoye Rural Settlement, Nikolsky District, Vologda Oblast, Russia. The population was 173 as of 2002.

== Geography ==
Kipshenga is located 20 km north of Nikolsk (the district's administrative centre) by road. Myakishevo is the nearest rural locality.
