= Verkhnyaya Kema =

Verkhnyaya Kema Верхняя Кема
- Selo
- Location within Vologda Oblast Location within Russia
- Coordinates: 59°36′N 44°41′E
- Country: Russia
- Region: Vologda Oblast
- District: Nikolsky District
- Time zone: UTC+3:00

Verkhnyaya Kema (Russian: Верхняя Кема) is a rural locality (a settlement) in Kemskoye Rural Settlement, Nikolsky District, Vologda Oblast, Russia. The population was 50 as of 2002.

== Geography ==
Verkhnyaya Kema is located 61 km northwest of Nikolsk (the district's administrative centre) by road. Kostylevo is the nearest rural locality.
