= Bogdanovka, Vologda Oblast =

Bogdanovka Богдановка
- Village
- Location within Vologda Oblast Location within Russia
- Coordinates: 59°40′N 45°00′E
- Country: Russia
- Region: Vologda Oblast
- District: Nikolsky District
- Time zone: UTC+3:00

Bogdanovka (Russian: Богдановка) is a rural locality (a village) in Niginskoye Rural Settlement, Nikolsky District, Vologda Oblast, Russia. The population was 6 as of 2002.

== Geography ==
Bogdanovka is located 41 km (25 mi) northwest of Nikolsk (the district's administrative centre) by road. Krasavino is the nearest rural locality.
