= Filimonovy Gari =

Filimonovy Gari Филимоновы Гари
- Village
- Location within Vologda Oblast Location within Russia
- Coordinates: 59°37′N 45°43′E
- Country: Russia
- Region: Vologda Oblast
- District: Nikolsky District
- Time zone: UTC+3:00

Filimonovy Gari (Russian: Филимоновы Гари) is a rural locality (a village) in Baydarovskoye Rural Settlement, Nikolsky District, Vologda Oblast, Russia. The population was 38 as of 2002.

== Geography ==
Filimonovy Gari is located 22 km northeast of Nikolsk (the district's administrative centre) by road. Zaymishche is the nearest rural locality.
