= Noskovo, Nikolsky District, Vologda Oblast =

Noskovo Носково
- Village
- Location within Vologda Oblast Location within Russia
- Coordinates: 59°37′N 45°28′E
- Country: Russia
- Region: Vologda Oblast
- District: Nikolsky District
- Time zone: UTC+3:00

Noskovo (Russian: Носково) is a rural locality (a village) in Krasnopolyanskoye Rural Settlement, Nikolsky District, Vologda Oblast, Russia. The population was 2 as of 2002.

== Geography ==
Noskovo is located 13 km northeast of Nikolsk (the district's administrative centre) by road. Gora is the nearest rural locality.
