= Kamenny, Vologda Oblast =

Kamenny Каменный
- Village
- Location within Vologda Oblast Location within Russia
- Coordinates: 59°40′N 45°12′E
- Country: Russia
- Region: Vologda Oblast
- District: Nikolsky District
- Time zone: UTC+3:00

Kamenny (Russian: Каменный) is a rural locality (a village) in Niginskoye Rural Settlement, Nikolsky District, Vologda Oblast, Russia. The population was 21 as of 2002.

== Geography ==
The distance to Nikolsk is 30 km, to Nigino is 12 km. Pyatakov is the nearest rural locality.
