= Rodyukino =

Rodyukino Родюкино
- Village
- Location within Vologda Oblast Location within Russia
- Coordinates: 59°30′N 45°28′E
- Country: Russia
- Region: Vologda Oblast
- District: Nikolsky District
- Time zone: UTC+3:00

Rodyukino (Russian: Родюкино) is a rural locality (a village) in Krasnopolyanskoye Rural Settlement, Nikolsky District, Vologda Oblast, Russia. The population was 171 as of 2002. There are 5 streets.

== Geography ==
Rodyukino is located 3 km southeast of Nikolsk (the district's administrative centre) by road. Krivodeyevo is the nearest rural locality.
