= Myakishevo, Nikolsky District, Vologda Oblast =

Myakishevo Мякишево
- Village
- Location within Vologda Oblast Location within Russia
- Coordinates: 59°42′N 45°22′E
- Country: Russia
- Region: Vologda Oblast
- District: Nikolsky District
- Time zone: UTC+3:00

Myakishevo (Russian: Мякишево) is a rural locality (a village) in Terebayevskoye Rural Settlement, Nikolsky District, Vologda Oblast, Russia. The population was 86 as of 2002.

== Geography ==
Myakishevo is located 21 km (13 mi) north of Nikolsk (the district's administrative centre) by road. Kipshenga is the nearest rural locality.
