= Samylovo, Nikolsky District, Vologda Oblast =

Samylovo Самылово
- Village
- Location within Vologda Oblast Location within Russia
- Coordinates: 59°41′N 45°18′E
- Country: Russia
- Region: Vologda Oblast
- District: Nikolsky District
- Time zone: UTC+3:00

Samylovo (Russian: Самылово) is a rural locality (a village) in Niginskoye Rural Settlement, Nikolsky District, Vologda Oblast, Russia. The population was 19 as of 2002.

== Geography ==
Samylovo is located 23 km northwest of Nikolsk (the district's administrative centre) by road. Petryanino is the nearest rural locality.
