= Tokovitsa =

Tokovitsa Токовица
- Village
- Location within Vologda Oblast Location within Russia
- Coordinates: 59°24′N 45°50′E
- Country: Russia
- Region: Vologda Oblast
- District: Nikolsky District
- Time zone: UTC+3:00

Tokovitsa (Russian: Токовица) is a rural locality (a village) in Zavrazhskoye Rural Settlement, Nikolsky District, Vologda Oblast, Russia. The population was 23 as of 2002.

== Geography ==
Tokovitsa is located 34 km southeast of Nikolsk (the district's administrative centre) by road. Zavrazhye is the nearest rural locality.
