= Malye Gari =

Malye Gari Малые Гари
- Village
- Location within Vologda Oblast Location within Russia
- Coordinates: 59°35′N 45°47′E
- Country: Russia
- Region: Vologda Oblast
- District: Nikolsky District
- Time zone: UTC+3:00

Malye Gari (Russian: Малые Гари) is a rural locality (a village) in Baydarovskoye Rural Settlement, Nikolsky District, Vologda Oblast, Russia. The population was 3 as of 2002.

== Geography ==
The distance to Nikolsk is 40 km, to Baydarovo is 16 km. Zaymishche is the nearest rural locality.
