= Bolshoye Sverchkovo =

Bolshoye Sverchkovo Большое Сверчково
- Village
- Location within Vologda Oblast Location within Russia
- Coordinates: 59°15′N 45°49′E
- Country: Russia
- Region: Vologda Oblast
- District: Nikolsky District
- Time zone: UTC+3:00

Bolshoye Sverchkovo (Russian: Большое Сверчково) is a rural locality (a village) in Permasskoye Rural Settlement, Nikolsky District, Vologda Oblast, Russia. The population was 102 as of 2002.

== Geography ==
Bolshoye Sverchkovo is located 44 km southeast of Nikolsk (the district's administrative centre) by road. Maloye Sverchkovo is the nearest rural locality.
