= Zavrazhye, Nikolsky District, Vologda Oblast =

Zavrazhye Завражье
- Village
- Location within Vologda Oblast Location within Russia
- Coordinates: 59°26′N 45°51′E
- Country: Russia
- Region: Vologda Oblast
- District: Nikolsky District
- Time zone: UTC+3:00

Zavrazhye (Russian: Завражье) is a rural locality (a village) and the administrative center of Zavrazhskoye Rural Settlement, Nikolsky District, Vologda Oblast, Russia. The population was 244 as of 2002. There are 8 streets.

== Geography ==
Zavrazhye is located 30 km southeast of Nikolsk (the district's administrative centre) by road. Yermakovo is the nearest village.
