= Bolshoy Dvor, Nikolsky District, Vologda Oblast =

Bolshoy Dvor Большой Двор
- Village
- Location within Vologda Oblast Location within Russia
- Coordinates: 59°38′N 45°31′E
- Country: Russia
- Region: Vologda Oblast
- District: Nikolsky District
- Time zone: UTC+3:00

Bolshoy Dvor (Russian: Большой Двор) is a rural locality (a village) in Baydarovskoye Rural Settlement, Nikolsky District, Vologda Oblast, Russia. The population was 60 as of 2002.

== Geography ==
The distance to Nikolsk is 23 km (14 mi), to Baydarovo is 3 km (1.9 mi). Solotnovo is the nearest rural locality.
