= Ivakovo =

Ivakovo Иваково
- Village
- Location within Vologda Oblast Location within Russia
- Coordinates: 59°45′N 45°23′E
- Country: Russia
- Region: Vologda Oblast
- District: Nikolsky District
- Time zone: UTC+3:00

Ivakovo (Russian: Иваково) is a rural locality (a village) in Terebayevskoye Rural Settlement, Nikolsky District, Vologda Oblast, Russia. The population was 6 as of 2002.

== Geography ==
Ivakovo is located 32 km north of Nikolsk (the district's administrative centre) by road. Kovrigino is the nearest rural locality.
