= Karnysh =

Karnysh Карныш
- Village
- Location within Vologda Oblast Location within Russia
- Coordinates: 59°32′N 45°11′E
- Country: Russia
- Region: Vologda Oblast
- District: Nikolsky District
- Time zone: UTC+3:00

Karnysh (Russian: Карныш) is a rural locality (a village) in Krasnopolyanskoye Rural Settlement, Nikolsky District, Vologda Oblast, Russia. The population was 91 as of 2002.

== Geography ==
Karnysh is located 20 km west of Nikolsk (the district's administrative centre) by road. Molodyozhny is the nearest rural locality.
