= Pyatakov, Vologda Oblast =

Village in Russia

Pyatakov Пятаков
- Village
- Location within Vologda Oblast Location within Russia
- Coordinates: 59°42′N 45°05′E
- Country: Russia
- Region: Vologda Oblast
- District: Nikolsky District
- Time zone: UTC+3:00

Pyatakov (Russian: Пятаков) is a rural locality (a village) in Niginskoye Rural Settlement, Nikolsky District, Vologda Oblast, Russia. The population was 30 as of 2002.

== Geography ==
The distance to Nikolsk is 32 km, to Nigino is 14 km. Yelkhovka is the nearest rural locality.
