= Stepshinsky =

Stepshinsky Степшинский
- Village
- Location within Vologda Oblast Location within Russia
- Coordinates: 59°48′N 45°20′E
- Country: Russia
- Region: Vologda Oblast
- District: Nikolsky District
- Time zone: UTC+3:00

Stepshinsky (Russian: Степшинский) is a rural locality (a village) in Terebayevskoye Rural Settlement, Nikolsky District, Vologda Oblast, Russia. The population was 41 as of 2002.

== Geography ==
The distance to Nikolsk is 30 km, to Terebayevo is 14 km. Chyornaya is the nearest rural locality.
