= Leunino =

Leunino Леунино
- Village
- Location within Vologda Oblast Location within Russia
- Coordinates: 59°51′N 45°10′E
- Country: Russia
- Region: Vologda Oblast
- District: Nikolsky District
- Time zone: UTC+3:00

Leunino (Russian: Леунино) is a rural locality (a village) in Argunovskoye Rural Settlement, Nikolsky District, Vologda Oblast, Russia. The population was 19 as of 2002.

== Geography ==
Leunino is located 48 km northwest of Nikolsk (the district's administrative centre) by road. Nikolskoye is the nearest rural locality.
