= Prudishnaya =

Prudishnaya Прудишная
- Village
- Location within Vologda Oblast Location within Russia
- Coordinates: 59°40′N 45°13′E
- Country: Russia
- Region: Vologda Oblast
- District: Nikolsky District
- Time zone: UTC+3:00

Prudishnaya (Russian: Прудишная) is a rural locality (a village) in Niginskoye Rural Settlement, Nikolsky District, Vologda Oblast, Russia. The population was 17 as of 2002.

== Geography ==
Prudishnaya is located 23 km northwest of Nikolsk (the district's administrative centre) by road. Levkin is the nearest rural locality.
