= Kozhayevo =

Kozhayevo Кожаево
- Village
- Location within Vologda Oblast Location within Russia
- Coordinates: 59°28′N 45°30′E
- Country: Russia
- Region: Vologda Oblast
- District: Nikolsky District
- Time zone: UTC+3:00

Kozhayevo (Russian: Кожаево) is a rural locality (a village) in Krasnopolyanskoye Rural Settlement, Nikolsky District, Vologda Oblast, Russia. The population was 347 as of 2002. There are 10 streets.

== Geography ==
Kozhayevo is located 8 km southeast of Nikolsk (the district's administrative centre) by road. Dor is the nearest rural locality.
