= Shirokaya =

Shirokaya Широкая
- Village
- Location within Vologda Oblast Location within Russia
- Coordinates: 59°56′N 44°52′E
- Country: Russia
- Region: Vologda Oblast
- District: Nikolsky District
- Time zone: UTC+3:00

Shirokaya (Russian: Широкая) is a rural locality (a village) in Zelentsovskoye Rural Settlement, Nikolsky District, Vologda Oblast, Russia. The population was 26 as of 2002.

== Geography ==
Shirokaya is located 64 km northwest of Nikolsk (the district's administrative centre) by road. Sharzhenga is the nearest rural locality.
