= Kostenevo, Nikolsky District, Vologda Oblast =

Kostenevo Костенево
- Village
- Location within Vologda Oblast Location within Russia
- Coordinates: 59°38′N 44°39′E
- Country: Russia
- Region: Vologda Oblast
- District: Nikolsky District
- Time zone: UTC+3:00

Kostenevo (Russian: Костенево) is a rural locality (a village) in Kemskoye Rural Settlement, Nikolsky District, Vologda Oblast, Russia. The population was 12 as of 2002.

== Geography ==
Kostenevo is located 65 km northwest of Nikolsk (the district's administrative centre) by road. Paderino is the nearest rural locality.
