= Kotelnoye =

Kotelnoye Котельное
- Village
- Location within Vologda Oblast Location within Russia
- Coordinates: 59°45′N 45°03′E
- Country: Russia
- Region: Vologda Oblast
- District: Nikolsky District
- Time zone: UTC+3:00

Kotelnoye (Russian: Котельное) is a rural locality (a village) in Vakhnevskoye Rural Settlement, Nikolsky District, Vologda Oblast, Russia. The population was 187 as of 2002.

== Geography ==
Kotelnoye is located 44 km northwest of Nikolsk (the district's administrative centre) by road. Kamennoye is the nearest rural locality.
