= Kalauz =

Kalauz Калауз
- Village
- Location within Vologda Oblast Location within Russia
- Coordinates: 59°17′N 45°18′E
- Country: Russia
- Region: Vologda Oblast
- District: Nikolsky District
- Time zone: UTC+3:00

Kalauz (Russian: Калауз) is a rural locality (a village) in Permasskoye Rural Settlement, Nikolsky District, Vologda Oblast, Russia. The population was 11 as of 2002.

== Geography ==
Kalauz is located 54 km southwest of Nikolsk (the district's administrative centre) by road. Kudanga is the nearest rural locality.
