= Melentyevo, Nikolsky District, Vologda Oblast =

Melentyevo Мелентьево
- Village
- Location within Vologda Oblast Location within Russia
- Coordinates: 59°32′N 45°26′E
- Country: Russia
- Region: Vologda Oblast
- District: Nikolsky District
- Time zone: UTC+3:00

Melentyevo (Russian: Мелентьево) is a rural locality (a village) in Krasnopolyanskoye Rural Settlement, Nikolsky District, Vologda Oblast, Russia. The population was 546 as of 2002. There are 20 streets.

== Geography ==
Melentyevo is located 2 km northwest of Nikolsk (the district's administrative centre) by road. Nikolsk is the nearest rural locality.
