= Vysokinsky =

Vysokinsky Высокинский
- Settlement
- Location within Vologda Oblast Location within Russia
- Coordinates: 59°28′N 46°03′E
- Country: Russia
- Region: Vologda Oblast
- District: Nikolsky District
- Time zone: UTC+3:00

Vysokinsky (Russian: Высокинский) is a rural locality (a settlement) in Zavrazhskoye Rural Settlement, Nikolsky District, Vologda Oblast, Russia. The population was 299 as of 2010. There are 14 streets.

== Geography ==
Vysokinsky is located 44 km southeast of Nikolsk (the district's administrative centre) by road. Chegodayevsky is the nearest rural locality.
