= Bolshoye Fomino =

Bolshoye Fomino Большое Фомино
- Village
- Location within Vologda Oblast Location within Russia
- Coordinates: 59°34′N 45°34′E
- Country: Russia
- Region: Vologda Oblast
- District: Nikolsky District
- Time zone: UTC+3:00

Bolshoye Fomino (Russian: Большое Фомино) is a rural locality (a village) in Krasnopolyanskoye Rural Settlement, Nikolsky District, Vologda Oblast, Russia. The population was 33 as of 2002.

== Geography ==
Bolshoye Fomino is located 9 km (5.6 mi) northeast of Nikolsk (the district's administrative centre) by road. Maloye Fomino is the nearest rural locality.
