= Yelkhovetsky =

Yelkhovetsky Елховецкий
- Village
- Location within Vologda Oblast Location within Russia
- Coordinates: 59°32′N 45°00′E
- Country: Russia
- Region: Vologda Oblast
- District: Nikolsky District
- Time zone: UTC+3:00

Yelkhovetsky (Russian: Елховецкий) is a rural locality (a village) in Krasnopolyanskoye Rural Settlement, Nikolsky District, Vologda Oblast, Russia. The population was 6 as of 2002.

== Geography ==
The distance to Nikolsk is 31 km. Polezhayevo is the nearest rural locality.
