= Lantyug =

Lantyug Лантюг
- Settlement
- Location within Vologda Oblast Location within Russia
- Coordinates: 59°41′N 44°45′E
- Country: Russia
- Region: Vologda Oblast
- District: Nikolsky District
- Time zone: UTC+3:00

Lantyug (Russian: Лантюг) is a rural locality (a settlement) in Kemskoye Rural Settlement, Nikolsky District, Vologda Oblast, Russia. The population was 119 as of 2002.

== Geography ==
Lantyug is located 74 km northwest of Nikolsk (the district's administrative centre) by road. Kostylevo is the nearest rural locality.
