= Upiralovo =

Upiralovo Упиралово
- Village
- Location within Vologda Oblast Location within Russia
- Coordinates: 59°23′N 45°22′E
- Country: Russia
- Region: Vologda Oblast
- District: Nikolsky District
- Time zone: UTC+3:00

Upiralovo (Russian: Упиралово) is a rural locality (a village) in Krasnopolyanskoye Rural Settlement, Nikolsky District, Vologda Oblast, Russia. The population was 34 as of 2002. There are 2 streets.

== Geography ==
Upiralovo is located 29 km south of Nikolsk (the district's administrative centre) by road. Skochkovo is the nearest rural locality.
