= Permas, Vologda Oblast =

Permas Пермас
- Village
- Location within Vologda Oblast Location within Russia
- Coordinates: 59°19′N 45°36′E
- Country: Russia
- Region: Vologda Oblast
- District: Nikolsky District
- Time zone: UTC+3:00

Permas (Russian: Пермас) is a rural locality (a village) and the administrative center of Permasskoye Rural Settlement, Nikolsky District, Vologda Oblast, Russia. The population was 9 as of 2002.

== Geography ==
Permas is located 27 km south of Nikolsk (the district's administrative centre) by road. Brodovitsa is the nearest rural locality.
