= Irdanovo =

Irdanovo Ирданово
- Village
- Location within Vologda Oblast Location within Russia
- Coordinates: 59°32′N 45°30′E
- Country: Russia
- Region: Vologda Oblast
- District: Nikolsky District
- Time zone: UTC+3:00

Irdanovo (Russian: Ирданово) is a rural locality (a village) in Krasnopolyanskoye Rural Settlement, Nikolsky District, Vologda Oblast, Russia. The population was 321 as of 2002. There are 2 streets.

== Geography ==
Irdanovo is located 4 km northeast of Nikolsk (the district's administrative centre) by road. Abaturovo is the nearest rural locality.
