= Verkhovino =

Verkhovino Верховино
- Village
- Location within Vologda Oblast Location within Russia
- Coordinates: 59°33′N 44°42′E
- Country: Russia
- Region: Vologda Oblast
- District: Nikolsky District
- Time zone: UTC+3:00

Verkhovino (Russian: Верховино) is a rural locality (a village) in Kemskoye Rural Settlement, Nikolsky District, Vologda Oblast, Russia. The population was 114 as of 2002.

== Geography ==
Verkhovino is located 54 km west of Nikolsk (the district's administrative centre) by road. Starina is the nearest rural locality.
