= Zavarikha =

Zavarikha Завариха
- Village
- Location within Vologda Oblast Location within Russia
- Coordinates: 59°27′N 45°52′E
- Country: Russia
- Region: Vologda Oblast
- District: Nikolsky District
- Time zone: UTC+3:00

Zavarikha (Russian: Завариха) is a rural locality (a village) in Zavrazhskoye Rural Settlement, Nikolsky District, Vologda Oblast, Russia. The population was 57 as of 2002.

== Geography ==
Zavarikha is located 32 km southeast of Nikolsk (the district's administrative centre) by road. Starygino is the nearest rural locality.
