= Kurevino =

Kurevino Куревино
- Village
- Location within Vologda Oblast Location within Russia
- Coordinates: 59°22′N 45°51′E
- Country: Russia
- Region: Vologda Oblast
- District: Nikolsky District
- Time zone: UTC+3:00

Kurevino (Russian: Куревино) is a rural locality (a village) in Zavrazhskoye Rural Settlement, Nikolsky District, Vologda Oblast, Russia. The population was 43 as of 2002.

== Geography ==
Kurevino is located 37 km southeast of Nikolsk (the district's administrative centre) by road. Tokovitsa is the nearest rural locality.
