= Sinitsyno, Nikolsky District, Vologda Oblast =

Sinitsyno Синицыно
- Village
- Location within Vologda Oblast Location within Russia
- Coordinates: 59°51′N 44°49′E
- Country: Russia
- Region: Vologda Oblast
- District: Nikolsky District
- Time zone: UTC+3:00

Sinitsyno (Russian: Синицыно) is a rural locality (a village) in Zelentsovskoye Rural Settlement, Nikolsky District, Vologda Oblast, Russia. The population was 34 as of 2002.

== Geography ==
Sinitsyno is located 65 km northwest of Nikolsk (the district's administrative centre) by road. Malinovka is the nearest rural locality.
