= Chelpanovo =

Chelpanovo Челпаново
- Village
- Location within Vologda Oblast Location within Russia
- Coordinates: 59°46′N 45°17′E
- Country: Russia
- Region: Vologda Oblast
- District: Nikolsky District
- Time zone: UTC+3:00

Chelpanovo (Russian: Челпаново) is a rural locality (a village) in Terebayevskoye Rural Settlement, Nikolsky District, Vologda Oblast, Russia. The population was 57 as of 2002.

== Geography ==
Chelpanovo is located 31 km northwest of Nikolsk (the district's administrative centre) by road. Podolskaya is the nearest rural locality.
