= Serpovo =

Serpovo Серпово
- Village
- Location within Vologda Oblast Location within Russia
- Coordinates: 59°29′N 44°39′E
- Country: Russia
- Region: Vologda Oblast
- District: Nikolsky District
- Time zone: UTC+3:00

Serpovo (Russian: Серпово) is a rural locality (a village) in Kemskoye Rural Settlement, Nikolsky District, Vologda Oblast, Russia. The population was 19 as of 2002.

== Geography ==
Serpovo is located 54 km west of Nikolsk (the district's administrative centre) by road. Demino is the nearest rural locality.
