= Lisitsyno, Nikolsky District, Vologda Oblast =

Lisitsyno Лисицыно
- Village
- Location within Vologda Oblast Location within Russia
- Coordinates: 59°57′N 44°49′E
- Country: Russia
- Region: Vologda Oblast
- District: Nikolsky District
- Time zone: UTC+3:00

Lisitsyno (Russian: Лисицыно) is a rural locality (a village) in Zelentsovskoye Rural Settlement, Nikolsky District, Vologda Oblast, Russia. The population was 50 as of 2002.

== Geography ==
Lisitsyno is located 68 km northwest of Nikolsk (the district's administrative centre) by road. Shirokaya is the nearest rural locality.
