= Kostylevo, Nikolsky District, Vologda Oblast =

Kostylevo Костылево
- Village
- Location within Vologda Oblast Location within Russia
- Coordinates: 59°37′N 44°42′E
- Country: Russia
- Region: Vologda Oblast
- District: Nikolsky District
- Time zone: UTC+3:00

Kostylevo (Russian: Костылево) is a rural locality (a village) in Kemskoye Rural Settlement, Nikolsky District, Vologda Oblast, Russia. The population was 10 as of 2002.

== Geography ==
Kostylevo is located 64 km northwest of Nikolsk (the district's administrative centre) by road. Verkhnyaya Kema is the nearest rural locality.
