= Polezhayevo =

Polezhayevo Полежаево
- Village
- Location within Vologda Oblast Location within Russia
- Coordinates: 59°30′N 44°56′E
- Country: Russia
- Region: Vologda Oblast
- District: Nikolsky District
- Time zone: UTC+3:00

Polezhayevo (Russian: Полежаево) is a rural locality (a village) in Krasnopolyanskoye Rural Settlement, Nikolsky District, Vologda Oblast, Russia. The population was 136 as of 2002.

== Geography ==
Polezhayevo is located 36 km west of Nikolsk (the district's administrative centre) by road. Polovinka is the nearest rural locality.
