= Sharzhenga =

Sharzhenga Шарженга
- Settlement
- Location within Vologda Oblast Location within Russia
- Coordinates: 59°56′N 44°53′E
- Country: Russia
- Region: Vologda Oblast
- District: Nikolsky District
- Time zone: UTC+3:00

Sharzhenga (Russian: Шарженга) is a rural locality (a settlement) in Zelentsovskoye Rural Settlement, Nikolsky District, Vologda Oblast, Russia. The population was 146 as of 2010.

== Geography ==
Sharzhenga is located 68 km northwest of Nikolsk (the district's administrative centre) by road. Shirokaya is the nearest rural locality.
