= Pezhenga =

Pezhenga Пеженьга
- Village
- Location within Vologda Oblast Location within Russia
- Coordinates: 59°25′N 45°59′E
- Country: Russia
- Region: Vologda Oblast
- District: Nikolsky District
- Time zone: UTC+3:00

Pezhenga (Russian: Пеженьга) is a rural locality (a village) in Zavrazhskoye Rural Settlement, Nikolsky District, Vologda Oblast, Russia. The population was 2 as of 2002.

== Geography ==
Pezhenga is located 37 km southeast of Nikolsk (the district's administrative centre) by road. Vesyolaya Griva is the nearest rural locality.
