= Bolshoye Oksilovo =

Bolshoye Oksilovo Большое Оксилово
- Village
- Location within Vologda Oblast Location within Russia
- Coordinates: 59°47′N 45°12′E
- Country: Russia
- Region: Vologda Oblast
- District: Nikolsky District
- Time zone: UTC+3:00

Bolshoye Oksilovo (Russian: Большое Оксилово) is a rural locality (a village) in Vakhnevskoye Rural Settlement, Nikolsky District, Vologda Oblast, Russia. The population was 57 as of 2002.

== Geography ==
Bolshoye Oksilovo is located 38 km (24 mi) northwest of Nikolsk (the district's administrative centre) by road. Podgorye is the nearest rural locality.
