= Chushevino =

Chushevino Чушевино
- Village
- Location within Vologda Oblast Location within Russia
- Coordinates: 59°37′N 45°28′E
- Country: Russia
- Region: Vologda Oblast
- District: Nikolsky District
- Time zone: UTC+3:00

Chushevino (Russian: Чушевино) is a rural locality (a village) in Baydarovskoye Rural Settlement, Nikolsky District, Vologda Oblast, Russia. The population was 2 as of 2002.

== Geography ==
Chushevino is located 15 km northeast of Nikolsk (the district's administrative centre) by road. Noskovo is the nearest rural locality.
