= Terebayevo =

Terebayevo Теребаево
- Village
- Location within Vologda Oblast Location within Russia
- Coordinates: 59°42′N 45°21′E
- Country: Russia
- Region: Vologda Oblast
- District: Nikolsky District
- Time zone: UTC+3:00

Terebayevo (Russian: Теребаево) is a rural locality (a village) and the administrative center of Terebayevskoye Rural Settlement, Nikolsky District, Vologda Oblast, Russia. The population was 203 as of 2002.

== Geography ==
Terebayevo is located 22 km northwest of Nikolsk (the district's administrative centre) by road. Tarasovo is the nearest rural locality.
