= Nyunenga =

Nyunenga Нюненьга
- Settlement
- Location within Vologda Oblast Location within Russia
- Coordinates: 59°29′N 44°53′E
- Country: Russia
- Region: Vologda Oblast
- District: Nikolsky District
- Time zone: UTC+3:00

Nyunenga (Russian: Нюненьга) is a rural locality (a settlement) in Krasnopolyanskoye Rural Settlement, Nikolsky District, Vologda Oblast, Russia. The population was 128 as of 2010.

== Geography ==
Nyunenga is located 39 km west of Nikolsk (the district's administrative centre) by road. Polovinka is the nearest rural locality.
