= Konygino =

Konygino Коныгино
- Village
- Location within Vologda Oblast Location within Russia
- Coordinates: 59°33′N 45°26′E
- Country: Russia
- Region: Vologda Oblast
- District: Nikolsky District
- Time zone: UTC+3:00

Konygino (Russian: Коныгино) is a rural locality (a village) in Krasnopolyanskoye Rural Settlement, Nikolsky District, Vologda Oblast, Russia. The population was 77 as of 2002.

== Geography ==
Konygino is located 5 km northwest of Nikolsk (the district's administrative centre) by road. Krivodeyevo is the nearest rural locality.
