= Kuznechikha, Nikolsky District, Vologda Oblast =

Kuznechikha Кузнечиха
- Village
- Location within Vologda Oblast Location within Russia
- Coordinates: 59°29′N 45°29′E
- Country: Russia
- Region: Vologda Oblast
- District: Nikolsky District
- Time zone: UTC+3:00

Kuznechikha (Russian: Кузнечиха) is a rural locality or village in Krasnopolyanskoye Rural Settlement, Nikolsky District, Vologda Oblast, Russia. The population was 107 as of 2002.

== Geography ==
Kuznechikha is located 6 km southeast of Nikolsk (the district's administrative centre) by road. Rodyukino is the nearest rural locality.
