= Pogorelitsa =

Pogorelitsa Погорелица
- Village
- Location within Vologda Oblast Location within Russia
- Coordinates: 59°30′N 45°21′E
- Country: Russia
- Region: Vologda Oblast
- District: Nikolsky District
- Time zone: UTC+3:00

Pogorelitsa (Russian: Погорелица) is a rural locality (a village) in Krasnopolyanskoye Rural Settlement, Nikolsky District, Vologda Oblast, Russia. The population was 1 as of 2002.

== Geography ==
Pogorelitsa is located 9 km southwest of Nikolsk (the district's administrative centre) by road. Melentyevo is the nearest rural locality.
