= Filippovo, Nikolsky District, Vologda Oblast =

Filippovo Филиппово
- Village
- Location within Vologda Oblast Location within Russia
- Coordinates: 59°42′N 45°24′E
- Country: Russia
- Region: Vologda Oblast
- District: Nikolsky District
- Time zone: UTC+3:00

Filippovo (Russian: Филиппово) is a rural locality (a village) in Terebayevskoye Rural Settlement, Nikolsky District, Vologda Oblast, Russia. The population was 30 as of 2002.

== Geography ==
Filippovo is located 24 km north of Nikolsk (the district's administrative centre) by road. Kuznetsovo is the nearest rural locality.
