= Krivyatskoye =

Krivyatskoye Кривяцкое
- Village
- Location within Vologda Oblast Location within Russia
- Coordinates: 59°35′N 45°39′E
- Country: Russia
- Region: Vologda Oblast
- District: Nikolsky District
- Time zone: UTC+3:00

Krivyatskoye (Russian: Кривяцкое) is a rural locality (a village) in Baydarovskoye Rural Settlement, Nikolsky District, Vologda Oblast, Russia. The population was 141 as of 2002.

== Geography ==
Krivyatskoye is located 15 km northeast of Nikolsk (the district's administrative centre) by road. Kumbiser is the nearest rural locality.
