= Kovyrtsevo =

Kovyrtsevo Ковырцево
- Village
- Location within Vologda Oblast Location within Russia
- Coordinates: 59°38′N 45°32′E
- Country: Russia
- Region: Vologda Oblast
- District: Nikolsky District
- Time zone: UTC+3:00

Kovyrtsevo (Russian: Ковырцево) is a rural locality (a village) in Baydarovskoye Rural Settlement, Nikolsky District, Vologda Oblast, Russia. The population was 23 as of 2002.

== Geography ==
Kovyrtsevo is located 15 km northeast of Nikolsk (the district's administrative centre) by road. Travino is the nearest rural locality.
