= Kholshevikovo =

Kholshevikovo Холшевиково
- Village
- Location within Vologda Oblast Location within Russia
- Coordinates: 59°49′N 45°08′E
- Country: Russia
- Region: Vologda Oblast
- District: Nikolsky District
- Time zone: UTC+3:00

Kholshevikovo (Russian: Холшевиково) is a rural locality (a village) in Argunovskoye Rural Settlement, Nikolsky District, Vologda Oblast, Russia. The population was 111 as of 2002.

== Geography ==
Kholshevikovo is located 42 km northwest of Nikolsk (the district's administrative centre) by road. Chernino is the nearest rural locality.
