= Baydarovo =

Baydarovo Байдарово
- Village
- Location within Vologda Oblast Location within Russia
- Coordinates: 59°38′N 45°32′E
- Country: Russia
- Region: Vologda Oblast
- District: Nikolsky District
- Time zone: UTC+3:00

Baydarovo (Russian: Байдарово) is a rural locality (a village) and the administrative center of Baydarovskoye Rural Settlement, Nikolsky District, Vologda Oblast, Russia. The population was 148 as of 2002.

== Geography ==
Baydarovo is located 16 km (9.9 mi) northeast of Nikolsk (the district's administrative centre) by road. Kovyrtsevo is the nearest rural locality.
