= Verkhny Rystyug =

Verkhny Rystyug Верхний Рыстюг
- Village
- Location within Vologda Oblast Location within Russia
- Coordinates: 59°35′N 45°24′E
- Country: Russia
- Region: Vologda Oblast
- District: Nikolsky District
- Time zone: UTC+3:00

Verkhny Rystyug (Russian: Верхний Рыстюг) is a rural locality (a village) in Krasnopolyanskoye Rural Settlement, Nikolsky District, Vologda Oblast, Russia. The population was 54 as of 2002.

== Geography ==
Verkhny Rystyug is located 9 km northwest of Nikolsk (the district's administrative centre) by road. Kamenka is the nearest rural locality.
