= Dor, Nikolsky District, Vologda Oblast =

Dor Дор
- Village
- Location within Vologda Oblast Location within Russia
- Coordinates: 59°28′N 45°33′E
- Country: Russia
- Region: Vologda Oblast
- District: Nikolsky District
- Time zone: UTC+3:00

Dor (Russian: Дор) is a rural locality (a village) in Krasnopolyanskoye Rural Settlement, Nikolsky District, Vologda Oblast, Russia. The population was 141 as of 2002.

== Geography ==
The distance to Nikolsk is 10 km. Kuznechikha is the nearest rural locality.
