= Osinovaya Gar =

Osinovaya Gar Осиновая Гарь
- Village
- Location within Vologda Oblast Location within Russia
- Coordinates: 59°46′N 44°52′E
- Country: Russia
- Region: Vologda Oblast
- District: Nikolsky District
- Time zone: UTC+3:00

Osinovaya Gar (Russian: Осиновая Гарь) is a rural locality (a village) in Vakhnevskoye Rural Settlement, Nikolsky District, Vologda Oblast, Russia. The population was 59 as of 2002.

== Geography ==
Osinovaya Gar is located 55 km northwest of Nikolsk (the district's administrative centre) by road. Orlovo is the nearest rural locality.
