= Maloye Oksilovo =

Maloye Oksilovo Малое Оксилово
- Village
- Location within Vologda Oblast Location within Russia
- Coordinates: 59°48′N 45°14′E
- Country: Russia
- Region: Vologda Oblast
- District: Nikolsky District
- Time zone: UTC+3:00

Maloye Oksilovo (Russian: Малое Оксилово) is a rural locality (a village) in Vakhnevskoye Rural Settlement, Nikolsky District, Vologda Oblast, Russia. The population was 23 as of 2002.

== Geography ==
Maloye Oksilovo is located 41 km northwest of Nikolsk (the district's administrative centre) by road. Bolshoye Oksilovo is the nearest rural locality.
