= Syrkovo =

Syrkovo Сырково
- Village
- Location within Vologda Oblast Location within Russia
- Coordinates: 59°52′N 45°01′E
- Country: Russia
- Region: Vologda Oblast
- District: Nikolsky District
- Time zone: UTC+3:00

Syrkovo (Russian: Сырково) is a rural locality (a village) in Zelentsovskoye Rural Settlement, Nikolsky District, Vologda Oblast, Russia. The population was 56 as of 2002.

== Geography ==
Syrkovo is located 53 km northeast of Nikolsk (the district's administrative centre) by road. Zelentsovo is the nearest rural locality.
