= Paderino, Nikolsky District, Vologda Oblast =

Paderino Падерино
- Village
- Location within Vologda Oblast Location within Russia
- Coordinates: 59°37′N 44°39′E
- Country: Russia
- Region: Vologda Oblast
- District: Nikolsky District
- Time zone: UTC+3:00

Paderino (Russian: Падерино) is a rural locality (a village) in Kemskoye Rural Settlement, Nikolsky District, Vologda Oblast, Russia. The population was 5 as of 2002.

== Geography ==
Paderino is located 64 km northwest of Nikolsk (the district's administrative centre) by road. Kostenevo is the nearest rural locality.
