= Shiri, Vologda Oblast =

Shiri Шири
- Village
- Location within Vologda Oblast Location within Russia
- Coordinates: 59°17′N 45°32′E
- Country: Russia
- Region: Vologda Oblast
- District: Nikolsky District
- Time zone: UTC+3:00

Shiri (Russian: Шири) is a rural locality (a village) in Permasskoye Rural Settlement, Nikolsky District, Vologda Oblast, Russia. The population was 51 as of 2002.

== Geography ==
Shiri is located 35 km south of Nikolsk (the district's administrative centre) by road. Permas is the nearest rural locality.
