= Rokunovo =

Rokunovo Рокуново
- Village
- Location within Vologda Oblast Location within Russia
- Coordinates: 59°50′N 44°53′E
- Country: Russia
- Region: Vologda Oblast
- District: Nikolsky District
- Time zone: UTC+3:00

Rokunovo (Russian: Рокуново) is a rural locality (a village) in Zelentsovskoye Rural Settlement, Nikolsky District, Vologda Oblast, Russia. The population was 133 as of 2002.

== Geography ==
Rokunovo is located 63 km northwest of Nikolsk (the district's administrative centre) by road. Sinitsyno is the nearest rural locality.
