= Gora, Nikolsky District, Vologda Oblast =

Gora Гора
- Village
- Location within Vologda Oblast Location within Russia
- Coordinates: 59°36′N 45°29′E
- Country: Russia
- Region: Vologda Oblast
- District: Nikolsky District
- Time zone: UTC+3:00

Gora (Russian: Гора) is a rural locality (a village) in Krasnopolyanskoye Rural Settlement, Nikolsky District, Vologda Oblast, Russia. The population was 13 as of 2002.

== Geography ==
The distance to Nikolsk is 13 km. Selivanovo is the nearest rural locality.
