= Krasnoye Zvedeniye =

Krasnoye Zvedeniye Красное Зведение
- Village
- Location within Vologda Oblast Location within Russia
- Coordinates: 59°31′N 45°06′E
- Country: Russia
- Region: Vologda Oblast
- District: Nikolsky District
- Time zone: UTC+3:00

Krasnoye Zvedeniye (Russian: Красное Зведение) is a rural locality (a village) in Krasnopolyanskoye Rural Settlement, Nikolsky District, Vologda Oblast, Russia. The population was 25 as of 2002.

== Geography ==
Krasnoye Zvedeniye is located 26 km west of Nikolsk (the district's administrative centre) by road. Molodyozhny is the nearest rural locality.
