= Perebor, Vologda Oblast =

Perebor Перебор
- Village
- Location within Vologda Oblast Location within Russia
- Coordinates: 59°54′N 44°55′E
- Country: Russia
- Region: Vologda Oblast
- District: Nikolsky District
- Time zone: UTC+3:00

Perebor (Russian: Перебор) is a rural locality (a village) in Zelentsovskoye Rural Settlement, Nikolsky District, Vologda Oblast, Russia. The population was 23 as of 2002.

== Geography ==
Perebor is located 61 km northwest of Nikolsk (the district's administrative centre) by road. Senino is the nearest rural locality.
