= Yamskaya, Nikolsky District, Vologda Oblast =

Yamskaya Ямская
- Village
- Location within Vologda Oblast Location within Russia
- Coordinates: 59°24′N 44°37′E
- Country: Russia
- Region: Vologda Oblast
- District: Nikolsky District
- Time zone: UTC+3:00

Yamskaya (Russian: Ямская) is a rural locality (a village) in Kemskoye Rural Settlement, Nikolsky District, Vologda Oblast, Russia. The population was 28 as of 2002.

== Geography ==
Yamskaya is located 60 km southwest of Nikolsk (the district's administrative centre) by road. Nikolskoye is the nearest rural locality.
