= Plaksino, Nikolsky District, Vologda Oblast =

Plaksino Плаксино
- Village
- Location within Vologda Oblast Location within Russia
- Coordinates: 59°27′N 45°32′E
- Country: Russia
- Region: Vologda Oblast
- District: Nikolsky District
- Time zone: UTC+3:00

Plaksino (Russian: Плаксино) is a rural locality (a village) in Krasnopolyanskoye Rural Settlement, Nikolsky District, Vologda Oblast, Russia. The population was 65 as of 2002.

== Geography ==
Plaksino is located 11 km southeast of Nikolsk (the district's administrative centre) by road. Dor is the nearest rural locality.
