= Storozhevaya, Vologda Oblast =

Storozhevaya Сторожевая
- Village
- Location within Vologda Oblast Location within Russia
- Coordinates: 59°21′N 45°34′E
- Country: Russia
- Region: Vologda Oblast
- District: Nikolsky District
- Time zone: UTC+3:00

Storozhevaya (Russian: Сторожевая) is a rural locality (a village) in Permasskoye Rural Settlement, Nikolsky District, Vologda Oblast, Russia. The population was 3 as of 2002.

== Geography ==
Storozhevaya is located 29 km southeast of Nikolsk (the district's administrative centre) by road. Lipovo is the nearest rural locality.
