= Vesyolaya Griva, Vologda Oblast =

Vesyolaya Griva Весёлая Грива
- Village
- Location within Vologda Oblast Location within Russia
- Coordinates: 59°24′N 45°57′E
- Country: Russia
- Region: Vologda Oblast
- District: Nikolsky District
- Time zone: UTC+3:00

Vesyolaya Griva (Russian: Весёлая Грива) is a rural locality (a village) in Zavrazhskoye Rural Settlement, Nikolsky District, Vologda Oblast, Russia. The population was 2 as of 2002.

== Geography ==
Vesyolaya Griva is located 33 km southeast of Nikolsk (the district's administrative centre) by road. Pezhenga is the nearest rural locality.
