= Lashovo =

Lashovo Лашово
- Village
- Location within Vologda Oblast Location within Russia
- Coordinates: 59°39′N 45°17′E
- Country: Russia
- Region: Vologda Oblast
- District: Nikolsky District
- Time zone: UTC+3:00

Lashovo (Russian: Лашово) is a rural locality (a village) in Niginskoye Rural Settlement, Nikolsky District, Vologda Oblast, Russia. The population was 53 as of 2002.

== Geography ==
Lashovo is located 21 km northwest of Nikolsk (the district's administrative centre) by road. Petryanino is the nearest rural locality.
