= Zelentsovo =

Zelentsovo Зеленцово
- Village
- Location within Vologda Oblast Location within Russia
- Coordinates: 59°52′N 44°58′E
- Country: Russia
- Region: Vologda Oblast
- District: Nikolsky District
- Time zone: UTC+3:00

Zelentsovo (Russian: Зеленцово) is a rural locality (a village) and the administrative center of Zelentsovskoye Rural Settlement, Nikolsky District, Vologda Oblast, Russia. The population was 353 as of 2002.

== Geography ==
Zelentsovo is located 55 km northwest of Nikolsk (the district's administrative centre) by road. Sluda is the nearest rural locality.
