= Gorokhovsky =

Gorokhovsky Гороховский
- Village
- Location within Vologda Oblast Location within Russia
- Coordinates: 59°15′N 45°20′E
- Country: Russia
- Region: Vologda Oblast
- District: Nikolsky District
- Time zone: UTC+3:00

Gorokhovsky (Russian: Гороховский) is a rural locality (a village) in Permasskoye Rural Settlement, Nikolsky District, Vologda Oblast, Russia. The population was 9 as of 2002.

== Geography ==
The distance to Nikolsk is 55 km, to Permas is 27 km. Kudanga is the nearest rural locality.
