= Dunilovo =

Dunilovo Дунилово
- Village
- Location within Vologda Oblast Location within Russia
- Coordinates: 59°20′N 45°50′E
- Country: Russia
- Region: Vologda Oblast
- District: Nikolsky District
- Time zone: UTC+3:00

Dunilovo (Russian: Дунилово) is a rural locality (a village) in Zavrazhskoye Rural Settlement, Nikolsky District, Vologda Oblast, Russia. The population was 68 as of 2002.

== Geography ==
Dunilovo is located 37 km southeast of Nikolsk (the district's administrative centre) by road. Kurevino is the nearest rural locality.
