= Podgorye, Nikolsky District, Vologda Oblast =

Podgorye Подгорье
- Village
- Location within Vologda Oblast Location within Russia
- Coordinates: 59°46′N 45°12′E
- Country: Russia
- Region: Vologda Oblast
- District: Nikolsky District
- Time zone: UTC+3:00

Podgorye (Russian: Подгорье) is a rural locality (a village) in Vakhnevskoye Rural Settlement, Nikolsky District, Vologda Oblast, Russia. The population was 47 as of 2002.

== Geography ==
Podgorye is located 35 km northwest of Nikolsk (the district's administrative centre) by road. Zakharovo is the nearest rural locality.
