= Vladimirovo, Vologda Oblast =

Vladimirovo Владимирово
- Village
- Location within Vologda Oblast Location within Russia
- Coordinates: 59°46′N 44°58′E
- Country: Russia
- Region: Vologda Oblast
- District: Nikolsky District
- Time zone: UTC+3:00

Vladimirovo (Russian: Владимирово) is a rural locality (a village) in Vakhnevskoye Rural Settlement, Nikolsky District, Vologda Oblast, Russia. The population was 37 as of 2002.

== Geography ==
Vladimirovo is located 48 km northwest of Nikolsk (the district's administrative centre) by road. Polovina is the nearest rural locality.
