= Kalinino, Nikolsky District, Vologda Oblast =

Kalinino Калинино
- Village
- Location within Vologda Oblast Location within Russia
- Coordinates: 59°45′N 45°20′E
- Country: Russia
- Region: Vologda Oblast
- District: Nikolsky District
- Time zone: UTC+3:00

Kalinino (Russian: Калинино) is a rural locality (a village) in Terebayevskoye Rural Settlement, Nikolsky District, Vologda Oblast, Russia. The population was 195 as of 2002.

== Geography ==
The distance to Nikolsk is 24 km, to Terebayevo is 7 km. Chelpanovo is the nearest rural locality.
