= Osinovo, Nikolsky District, Vologda Oblast =

Osinovo Осиново
- Village
- Location within Vologda Oblast Location within Russia
- Coordinates: 59°28′N 45°25′E
- Country: Russia
- Region: Vologda Oblast
- District: Nikolsky District
- Time zone: UTC+3:00

Osinovo (Russian: Осиново) is a rural locality (a village) in Krasnopolyanskoye Rural Settlement, Nikolsky District, Vologda Oblast, Russia. The population was 309 as of 2002. There are 11 streets.

== Geography ==
Osinovo is located 11 km southwest of Nikolsk (the district's administrative centre) by road. Levoberezhny is the nearest rural locality.
