= Abaturovo =

Abaturovo (Russian: Абатурово) is the name of several rural localities in Russia:

- Abaturovo, Arkhangelsk Oblast, a village in Moshinsky Settlement of Nyandomsky District in Arkhangelsk Oblast; 61°41′31″N 40°58′53″E
- Abaturovo, Nizhny Novgorod Oblast, a village in Rabotkinsky Selsoviet of Kstovsky District in Nizhny Novgorod Oblast; 56°00′53″N 44°37′19″E
- Abaturovo, Tver Oblast, a village in Malovasilevskoye Rural Settlement of Kimrsky District in Tver Oblast; 57°00′50″N 37°04′28″E
- Abaturovo, Vologda Oblast, a village in Krasnopolyansky Selsoviet of Nikolsky District in Vologda Oblast
- Abaturovo, Yaroslavl Oblast, a village in Klementyevsky Rural Okrug of Uglichsky District in Yaroslavl Oblast; 57°27′44″N 38°44′21″E
