= Abaturovo, Vologda Oblast =

Abaturovo Абатурово
- Village
- Location within Vologda Oblast Location within Russia
- Coordinates: 59°32′N 45°30′E
- Country: Russia
- Region: Vologda Oblast
- District: Nikolsky District
- Time zone: [[UTC+3:00]]

Abaturovo (Russian: Абатурово) is a rural locality (a village) in Krasnopolyanskoye Rural Settlement, Nikolsky District, Vologda Oblast, Russia. The population was 165 as of 2002. There are 13 streets.

== Geography ==
Abaturovo is located 3 km (1.9 mi) northeast of Nikolsk (the district's administrative centre) by road. Irdanovo is the nearest rural locality.

== Ethnicity ==
The village is inhabited by Russians and others.
