= Pertyug =

Pertyug Пертюг
- Village
- Location within Vologda Oblast Location within Russia
- Coordinates: 59°33′N 45°00′E
- Country: Russia
- Region: Vologda Oblast
- District: Nikolsky District
- Time zone: UTC+3:00

Pertyug (Russian: Пертюг) is a rural locality (a village) in Krasnopolyanskoye Rural Settlement, Nikolsky District, Vologda Oblast, Russia. The population was 9 as of 2002.

== Geography ==
Pertyug is located 32 km west of Nikolsk (the district's administrative centre) by road. Yelkhovetsky is the nearest rural locality.
