= Abaturov =

Abaturov (Russian: Абатуров; masculine) or Abaturova (Абатурова; feminine) is a Russian last name. It derives from the Russian dialectal word "абату́р" (abatur), meaning a stubborn, capricious person.

The following people share this last name:

- Yury Abaturov, commanding pilot of Aeroflot Flight 2230, which crashed after takeoff in 1967
- Yuriy Abaturov, Slovak association football player for MFK Vranov nad Topľou

== See also ==
- Abaturovo, several rural localities in Russia
