= Bludnovo =

Bludnovo Блудново
- Village
- Location within Vologda Oblast Location within Russia
- Coordinates: 59°23′N 45°33′E
- Country: Russia
- Region: Vologda Oblast
- District: Nikolsky District
- Time zone: UTC+3:00

Bludnovo (Russian: Блудново) is a rural locality (a village) in Permasskoye Rural Settlement, Nikolsky District, Vologda Oblast, Russia. The population was 60 as of 2002.

== Geography ==
Bludnovo is located 20 km (12 mi) south of Nikolsk (the district's administrative centre) by road. Kozlovka is the nearest rural locality.
