= Gvozdev =

Gvozdev or Gvozdyov (Russian: Гвоздев, Гвоздёв) is a Russian masculine surname originating from the word gvozd meaning a nail. Its feminine counterpart is Gvozdeva or Gvozdyova. The surname may refer to

- Ivan Gvozdev (1859–1932), Russian priest
- Mikhail Gvozdev (1700 – c.1759), Russian military geodesist
- Nikolas Gvosdev (born 1969), Russian-American international relations scholar
