= Argunovo, Nikolsky District, Vologda Oblast =

Argunovo Аргуново
- Village
- Location within Vologda Oblast Location within Russia
- Coordinates: 59°51′N 45°06′E
- Country: Russia
- Region: Vologda Oblast
- District: Nikolsky District
- Time zone: UTC+3:00

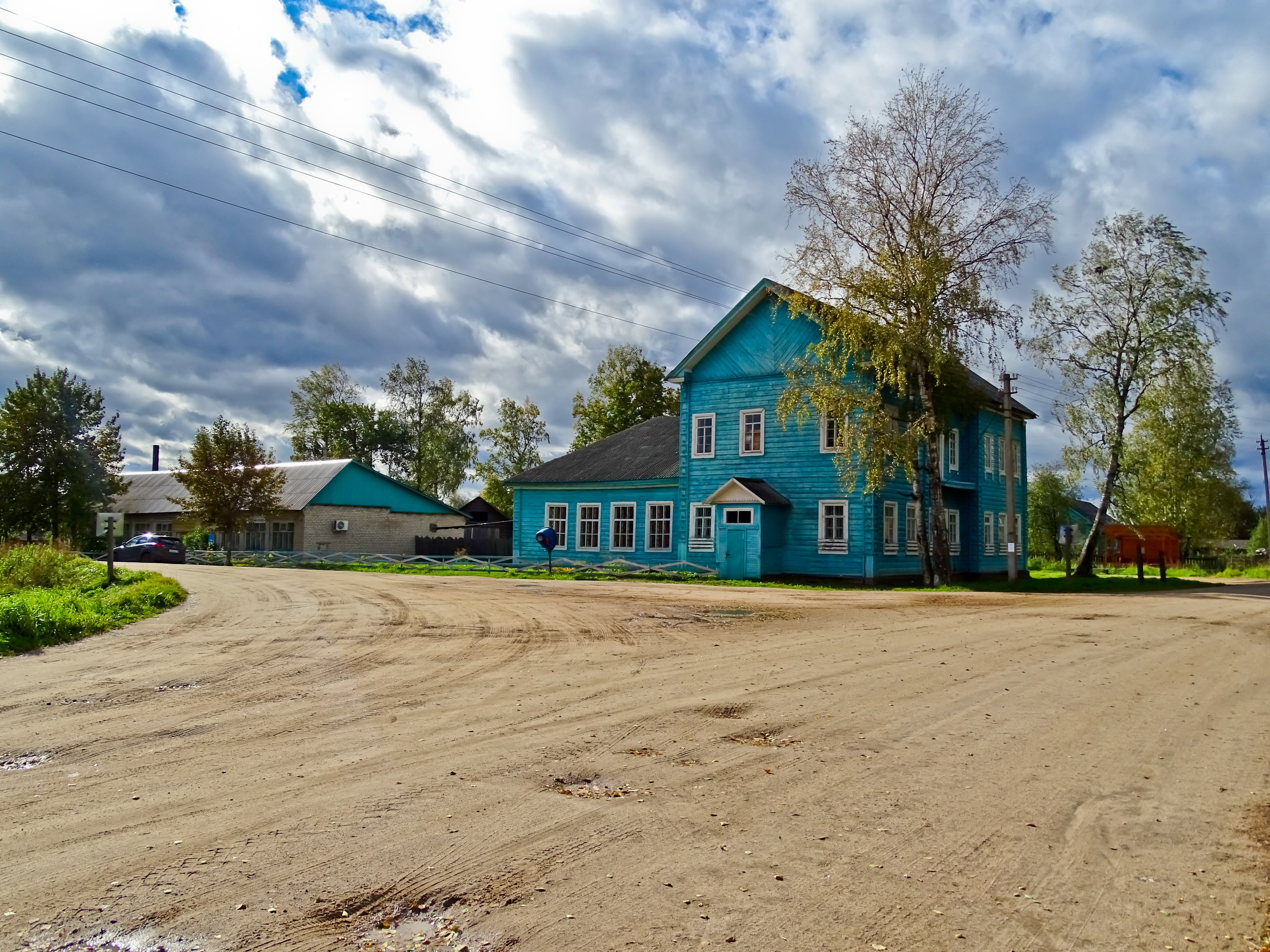
Russian Cultural Heritage Site in Argunovo

Argunovo (Russian: Аргуново) is a rural locality (a village) and the administrative center of Argunovskoye Rural Settlement, Nikolsky District, Vologda Oblast, Russia. The population was 256 as of 2002. There are 7 streets.

== Geography ==
Argunovo is located 47 km (29 mi) northwest of Nikolsk (the district's administrative centre) by road. Semenka is the nearest rural locality.
