= Nikolsk Airport =

Nikolsk
- IATA: none; ICAO: RU-0051

Summary
- Airport type: Public
- Location: Nikolsk
- Elevation AMSL: 551 ft / 168 m
- Coordinates: 59°29′48″N 45°31′6″E
- Interactive map of Nikolsk

Runways
Direction	Length		Surface
Direction	ft	m	Surface
17/35	4,101	1,250	Asphalt

Nikolsk (also listed as Nikolsk South) is an airport in Russia located 5 km southeast of Nikolsk in Vologda Oblast. It is a small paved civilian airfield with parking area and administration buildings.

== See also ==
- List of airports in Russia
