= Alexander Yashin =

Soviet writer

- Born: Alexander Yakovlevich Yashin; March 27, 1913; Bludnovo, Nikolsky Uyezd, Vologda Governorate, Russian Empire
- Died: July 11, 1968 (aged 55); Moscow, Soviet Union
- Writing career
- Notable works: Levers; A Feast of Rowanberries

Alexander Yakovlevich Yashin (Russian: Алекса́ндр Я́ковлевич Я́шин; March 27, 1913 – July 11, 1968) was a Soviet writer associated with the Village Prose movement.

== Biography ==
=== Early life ===
Yashin was born in the northern Russian village of Bludnovo, Nikolsky Uyezd, Vologda Governorate, to a poor peasant family. He finished a teachers' training college course and spent some time teaching in a village school. His first poems were published in various district newspapers between 1928 and 1929. His first book of poetry came out in 1934 in Arkhangelsk.

In the late 1930s he studied at the Maxim Gorky Literature Institute in Moscow where his book of poems, The Northern Maiden, was published in 1938. His long poem, Mother, followed in 1940.

=== Career ===
During World War II, Yashin was a naval war correspondent. He served with marine battalions during the Siege of Leningrad, with the Volga Fleet at Stalingrad, and with the Black Sea Fleet.

After the war he travelled back to the northern villages of his youth, staying with the builders at new construction sites and with the pioneers developing the virgin lands of Altay. His impressions are reflected in the numerous poetry collections he published in the 1940s, 50s, and 60s.

He began writing prose in the early 1960s. His best known stories were A Feast of Rowanberries and A Vologda Wedding. He died in Moscow in 1968.

== Awards ==
- Stalin Prize, 1950, for his poem Alena Fomina
- Order of the Red Star

== Notes ==
=== English translations ===
- Levers, Fifty Years of Russian Prose, Vol 2, M.I.T. Press, 1971.
- A Feast of Rowanberries, Anthology of Soviet Short Stories, Vol 1, Progress Publishers, Moscow, 1976.
