= Ivan Gvozdev =

Ivan Gvozdev Russian: Иван Гвоздев
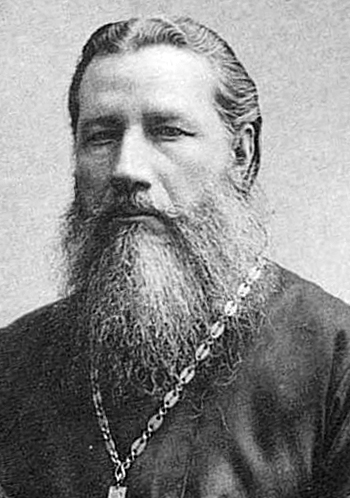
- photo of 1913

Deputy of the Fourth Imperial Duma
- In office 20 November 1912 – 6 October 1917
- Monarch: Nicholas II / monarchy abolished
- Succeeded by: post abolished

Personal details
- Born: Ivan Mikhailovich Gvozdev; 12 May 1859 Nikolsky Uyezd, Vologda Governorate, Russian Empire
- Died: 1932 Vologda Oblast, USSR
- Party: right

Ivan Mikhailovich Gvozdev (Russian: Иоа́нн (Ива́н) Миха́йлович Гво́здев; May 12, 1859 in Nikolsky Uyezd, Vologda Governorate – 1932 in Vologda Oblast) was a priest (father), a deputy of the clergy in his governorate and a deputy of the Fourth Imperial Duma from the Vologda Governorate between 1912 and 1917. He had right political position. After the February Revolution of 1917, he returned to his homeland; in 1931 his house and all his property were confiscated.

== Literature ==
- Николаев А. Б. Гвоздев Иоанн Михайлович (in Russian) // Государственная дума Российской империи: 1906—1917 / Б. Ю. Иванов, А. А. Комзолова, И. С. Ряховская. — Москва: РОССПЭН, 2008. — P. 122. — 735 p. — ISBN 978-5-8243-1031-3.
- Гвоздев (in Russian) // Члены Государственной думы (портреты и биографии): Четвертый созыв, 1912—1917 г. / сост. М. М. Боиович. — Москва: Тип. Т-ва И. Д. Сытина, 1913. — P. 35. — LXIV, 454, [2] p.
- Разные известия по епархии // Вологодские епархиальные ведомости : Изд. Вологодской духовной консистории / Ред. И. Н. Суворов. — Вологда: типография Губернского Правления, 1898. — 1 октября (No. 19). — P. 229–231. (in Russian)
