= Argunovo, Kirillovsky District, Vologda Oblast =

Argunovo Аргуново
- Village
- Location within Vologda Oblast Location within Russia
- Coordinates: 59°51′N 38°54′E
- Country: Russia
- Region: Vologda Oblast
- District: Kirillovsky District
- Time zone: UTC+3:00

Argunovo (Russian: Аргуново) is a rural locality (a village) in Nikolotorzhskoye Rural Settlement, Kirillovsky District, Vologda Oblast, Russia. The population was 1 as of 2002.

== Geography ==
Argunovo is located 34 km east of Kirillov (the district's administrative centre) by road. Yeltukhovo is the nearest rural locality.
