= Pyshchugsky District =

Pyshchugsky District Пыщугский район (Russian)
- District
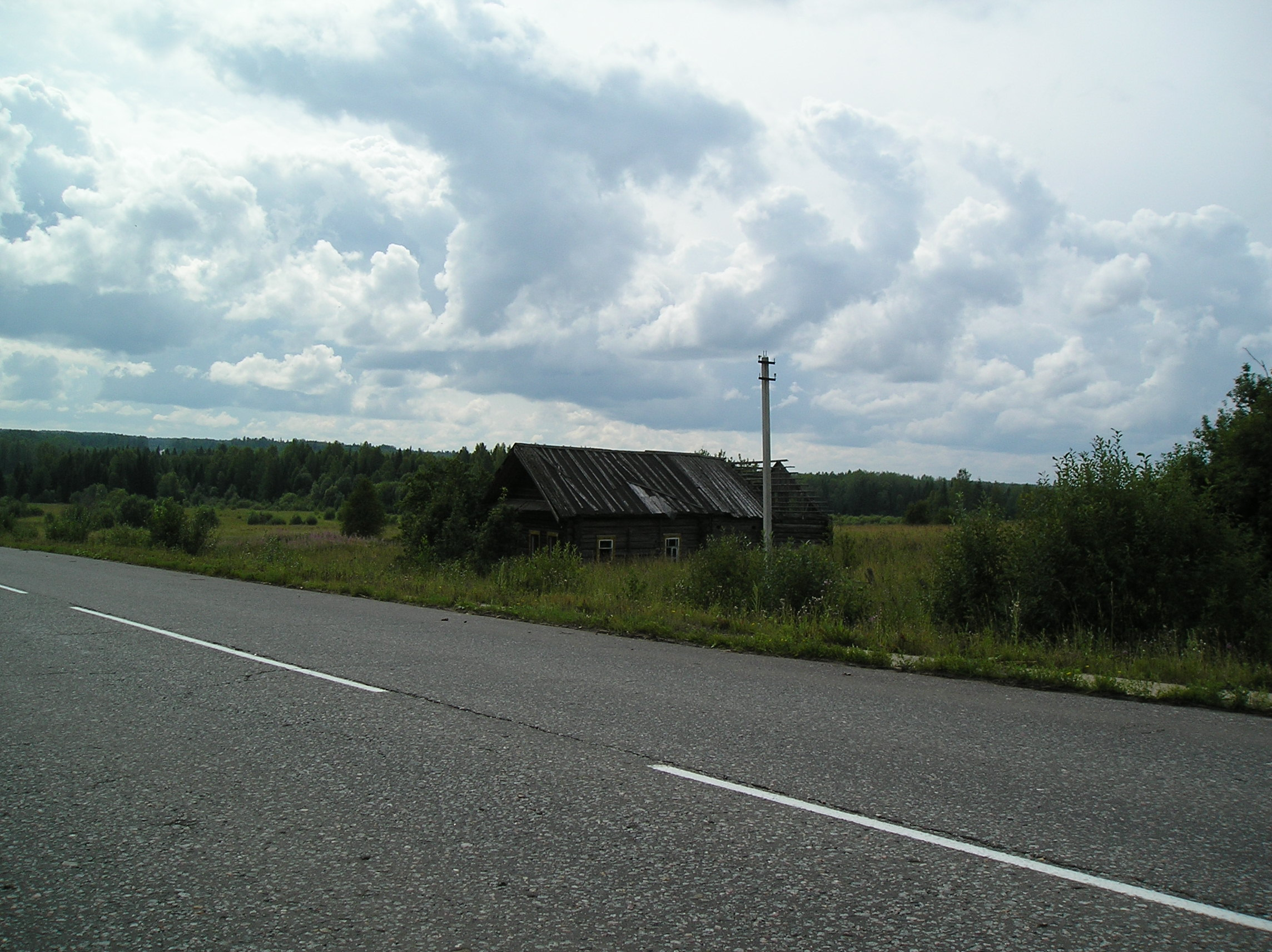
- Landscape in Pyshchugsky District

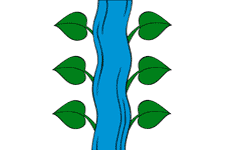
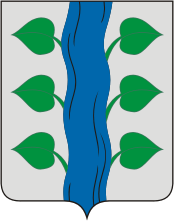
- Flag Coat of arms
- Location of Pyshchugsky District in Kostroma Oblast
- Coordinates: 58°53′01″N 45°42′35″E
- Country: Russia
- Federal subject: Kostroma Oblast
- Administrative center: Pyshchug

Area
  - Total: 1,966 km^{2} (759 sq mi)

Population (2010 Census)
  - Total: 5,201
  - Density: 2.645/km^{2} (6.852/sq mi)
  - Urban: 0%
  - Rural: 100%

Administrative structure
  - Administrative divisions: 4 Settlements
  - Inhabited localities: 46 rural localities

Municipal structure
  - Municipally incorporated as: Pyshchugsky Municipal District
  - Municipal divisions: 0 urban settlements, 4 rural settlements
- Time zone: UTC+3 (MSK)
- OKTMO ID: 34638000
- Website: http://www.pyshchug-adm.ru/

Pyshchugsky District (Russian: Пы́щугский райо́н) is an administrative and municipal district (raion), one of the twenty-four in Kostroma Oblast, Russia. It is located in the northeast of the oblast. The area of the district is 1,966 square kilometers (759 sq mi). Its administrative center is the rural locality (a selo) of Pyshchug. Population: 3,484 (2021 census); 5,201 (2010 census); 6,176 (2002 Census); 6,965 (1989 Soviet census). The population of Pyshchug accounts for 60.3% of the district's total population.
