= Putilovo, Gryazovetsky District, Vologda Oblast =

Putilovo Путилово
- Village
- Location within Vologda Oblast Location within Russia
- Coordinates: 58°54′N 41°06′E
- Country: Russia
- Region: Vologda Oblast
- District: Gryazovetsky District
- Time zone: UTC+3:00

Putilovo (Russian: Путилово) is a rural locality (a village) in Vokhtozhskoye Rural Settlement, Gryazovetsky District, Vologda Oblast, Russia. The population was 77 as of 2002.

== Geography ==
Putilovo is located 73 km east of Gryazovets (the district's administrative centre) by road. Orlovo is the nearest rural locality.
