= Nikolsky Uyezd =

Subdivision of the Russian Empire

Nikolsky Uyezd (Russian: Никольский уезд) was one of the subdivisions of the Vologda Governorate of the Russian Empire. It was situated in the southern part of the governorate. Its administrative centre was Nikolsk. In terms of present-day administrative borders, the territory of Nikolsky Uyezd is divided between the Nikolsky, Babushkinsky and Kichmengsko-Gorodetsky districts of Vologda Oblast and Podosinovsky District of Kirov Oblast.

== Demographics ==
At the time of the Russian Empire Census of 1897, Nikolsky Uyezd had a population of 172,187. Of these, 99.9% spoke Russian as their native language.
