= Pyshchug =

Rural locality in Kostroma Oblast, Russia

Coordinates: 58°53′13″N 45°42′47″E

Pyshchug (Russian: Пы́щуг) is a rural locality (a selo) and the administrative center of Pyshchugsky District, Kostroma Oblast, Russia. Population: 3,137 (2010 census); 3,311 (2002 census); 3,242 (1989 Soviet census).
