= Nikolsk, Vologda Oblast =

Town in Vologda Oblast, Russia

Nikolsk Никольск
- Town
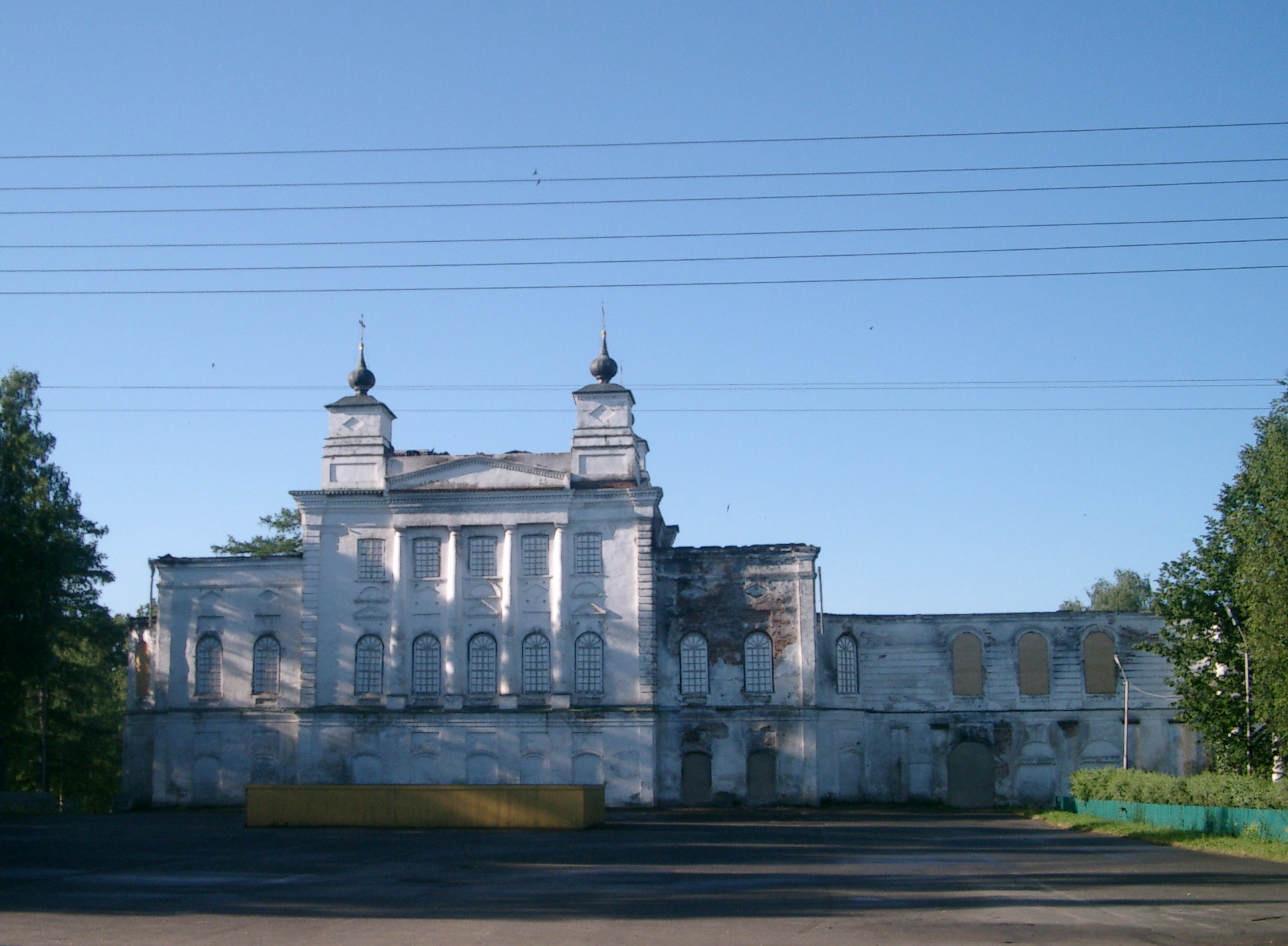
- The Presentation Cathedral (1780-1833) in Nikolsk after the 2005 fire

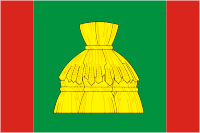
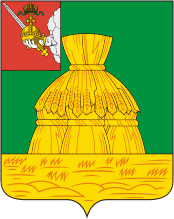
- Flag Coat of arms
- Interactive map of Nikolsk
- Location of Nikolsk Nikolsk (Vologda Oblast)
- Coordinates: 59°31′49″N 45°27′30″E
- Country: Russia
- Federal subject: Vologda Oblast
- Administrative district: Nikolsky District
- Town of district significanceSelsoviet: Nikolsk
- Town status since: 1780
- Elevation: 140 m (460 ft)

Population (2010 Census)
  - Total: 8,511
  - Estimate (2023): 7,607 (−10.6%)

Administrative status
  - Capital of: Nikolsky District, town of district significance of Nikolsk

Municipal status
  - Municipal district: Nikolsky Municipal District
  - Urban settlement: Nikolsk Urban Settlement
  - Capital of: Nikolsky Municipal District, Nikolsk Urban Settlement
- Time zone: UTC+3 (MSK)
- Postal code: 161440–161441
- Dialing code: +7 81754
- OKTMO ID: 19634101001
- Website: vologda-nikolsk.ru

Nikolsk (Russian: Нико́льск) is a town and the administrative center of Nikolsky District in Vologda Oblast, Russia, located on the right bank of the Yug River. Population: 8,511 (2010 census); 8,649 (2002 census); 8,574 (1989 Soviet census).

== History ==
The area was populated by Finnic peoples. In the 14th-15th centuries, during the colonization, it was a disputed territory between the Grand Duchy of Moscow and the Novgorod Republic. Novgorod controlled a major part of the Russian North, and, in particular, all areas along the Sukhona River northeast of what is now Nikolsky District. Moscow controlled Veliky Ustyug, which it inherited from the Vladimir–Suzdal Principality, while the Yug River was the waterway it used to get to Veliky Ustyug. It is known that in 1425 Nikolsk and surrounding territories paid tribute to Novgorod. In the end of the 15th century, the Grand Duchy of Moscow took over the Novgorod's territories and Nikolsk became one of the key points on the way from Moscow to the White Sea, which until 1703 was the main route for the foreign trade in Russia. The harbor of Nikolsk in particular was used to transport cargo.

In the course of the administrative reform carried out in 1708 by Peter the Great, the territory was included into Archangelgorod Governorate. In 1780, the governorate was abolished and transformed into Vologda Viceroyalty. At the same time, Nikolsk became the seat of an uyezd and was granted town rights. The viceroyalty was abolished in 1796 and Nikolsky Uyezd was transferred to Vologda Governorate. On July 24, 1918, the territory was transferred to the newly established Northern Dvina Governorate with the administrative center located in Veliky Ustyug. On April 18, 1924, the uyezds were abolished in favor of the new divisions, the districts, at which time Nikolsky District was established.

== Geography ==
=== Climate ===
Climate data for Nikolsk
Month	Jan	Feb	Mar	Apr	May	Jun	Jul	Aug	Sep	Oct	Nov	Dec	Year
Record high °C (°F)	3.7 (38.7)	5.0 (41.0)	16.2 (61.2)	27.2 (81.0)	32.1 (89.8)	34.0 (93.2)	34.3 (93.7)	36.4 (97.5)	27.7 (81.9)	22.5 (72.5)	11.5 (52.7)	7.5 (45.5)	36.4 (97.5)
Mean daily maximum °C (°F)	−8.6 (16.5)	−6.4 (20.5)	0.4 (32.7)	9.0 (48.2)	16.7 (62.1)	21.4 (70.5)	23.8 (74.8)	20.2 (68.4)	13.7 (56.7)	5.7 (42.3)	−2.3 (27.9)	−6.4 (20.5)	7.3 (45.1)
Daily mean °C (°F)	−12.2 (10.0)	−10.3 (13.5)	−4.3 (24.3)	3.8 (38.8)	10.6 (51.1)	15.6 (60.1)	18.2 (64.8)	15.2 (59.4)	9.7 (49.5)	3.0 (37.4)	−4.6 (23.7)	−9.3 (15.3)	3.0 (37.4)
Mean daily minimum °C (°F)	−15.8 (3.6)	−14.3 (6.3)	−8.9 (16.0)	−1.4 (29.5)	4.4 (39.9)	9.8 (49.6)	12.5 (54.5)	10.1 (50.2)	5.7 (42.3)	0.4 (32.7)	−6.9 (19.6)	−12.2 (10.0)	−1.4 (29.5)
Record low °C (°F)	−45.1 (−49.2)	−44.0 (−47.2)	−35.0 (−31.0)	−24.4 (−11.9)	−6.9 (19.6)	−1.4 (29.5)	1.6 (34.9)	−1.1 (30.0)	−7.4 (18.7)	−18.5 (−1.3)	−35.0 (−31.0)	−37.8 (−36.0)	−45.1 (−49.2)
Average precipitation mm (inches)	41.9 (1.65)	31.9 (1.26)	33.7 (1.33)	37.3 (1.47)	47.6 (1.87)	85.4 (3.36)	80.0 (3.15)	76.7 (3.02)	57.0 (2.24)	57.8 (2.28)	52.1 (2.05)	51.2 (2.02)	652.6 (25.69)
Source: Никольск погода и климат

== Administrative and municipal status ==
Within the framework of administrative divisions, Nikolsk serves as the administrative center of Nikolsky District. As an administrative division, it is incorporated within Nikolsky District as the town of district significance of Nikolsk. As a municipal division, the town of district significance of Nikolsk is incorporated within Nikolsky Municipal District as Nikolsk Urban Settlement.

== Economy ==
=== Industry ===
In Nikolsk, timber industry and food industry, including meat, milk, and bread production, are present. There is also linum textile production.

=== Transportation ===
The town used to be served by the Nikolsk Airport, which is currently closed.

Paved roads connect Nikolsk with Pyshchug and Manturovo in the south, crossing the border with Kostroma Oblast, with Totma in the west, and with Veliky Ustyug via Kichmengsky Gorodok in the north. There is regular bus service on these roads as well as local bus traffic.

The Yug River is navigable downstream from Nikolsk; however, there is no passenger navigation.

There are no railroads around Nikolsk and the closest railway stations with regular passenger service are Kotlas in Arkhangelsk Oblast and Sharya in Kostroma Oblast. There were plans to extend the Monza Railroad, a railway built for timber transport, which runs along the border of Vologda and Kostroma Oblasts, to Nikolsk; however, these plans never came to fruition.

== Culture and recreation ==
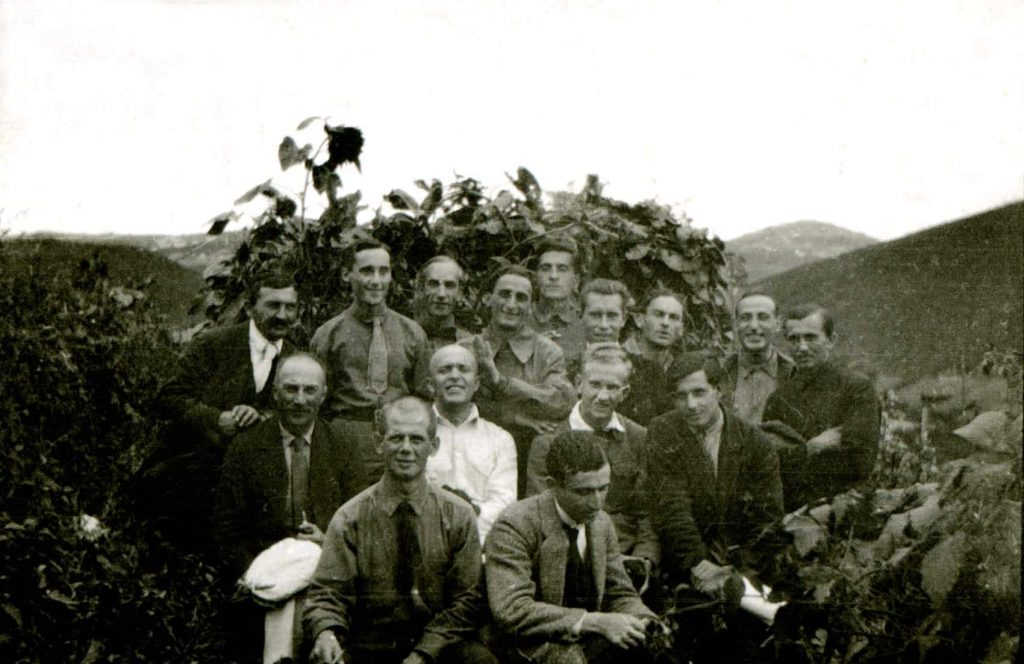
Nikolsk Cabaret

Nikolsk hosts sixty objects designated as cultural and historical heritage of local importance. These are the remains of the pre-1917 Nikolsk.

Author Alexander Yashin, associated with the Village Prose movement in Russian literature, was born in 1913 in what is now Nikolsky District, got his education in Nikolsk, and lived in the town until the mid-1930s. The only state museum in Nikolsk is the Memorial Museum of Alexander Yashin. The museum occupies the house which belonged to Yashin's parents as well as the former house of Yashin.
