= Nikolsky District, Vologda Oblast =

Nikolsky District Никольский район (Russian)
- District
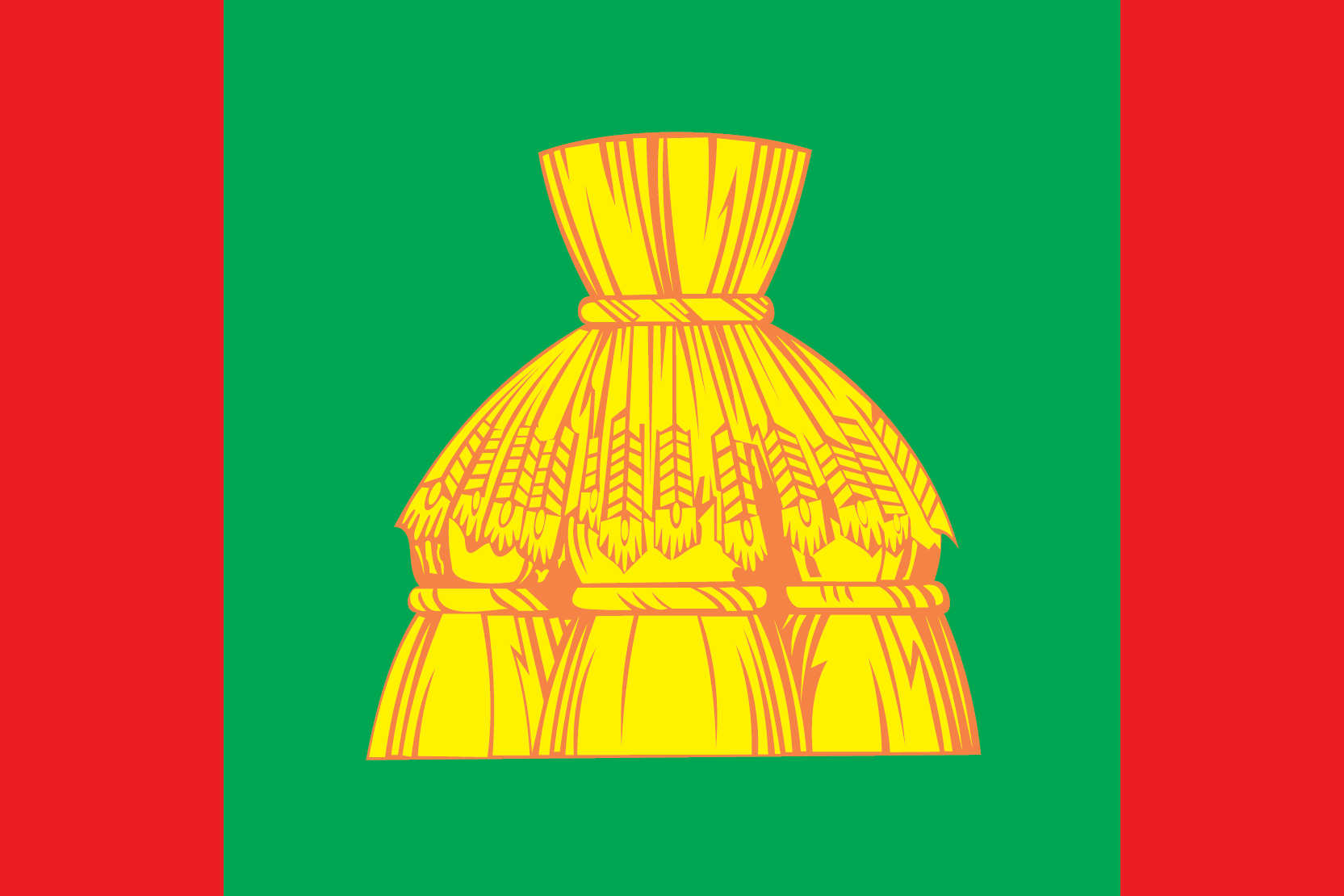
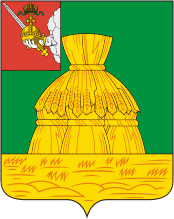
- Flag Coat of arms
- Location of Nikolsky District in Vologda Oblast
- Coordinates: 59°32′N 45°27′E
- Country: Russia
- Federal subject: Vologda Oblast
- Established: June 10, 1924
- Administrative center: Nikolsk

Area
  - Total: 7,476 km^{2} (2,886 sq mi)

Population (2010 Census)
  - Total: 22,414
  - Density: 2.998/km^{2} (7.765/sq mi)
  - Urban: 38.0%
  - Rural: 62.0%

Administrative structure
  - Administrative divisions: 1 Towns of district significance, 17 Selsoviets
  - Inhabited localities: 1 cities/towns, 222 rural localities

Municipal structure
  - Municipally incorporated as: Nikolsky Municipal District
  - Municipal divisions: 1 urban settlements, 10 rural settlements
- Time zone: UTC+3 (MSK)
- OKTMO ID: 19634000
- Website: https://www.nikolskreg.ru/

Nikolsky District (Russian: Нико́льский райо́н) is an administrative and municipal district (raion), one of the twenty-six in Vologda Oblast, Russia. It is located in the southeast of the oblast and borders with Kichmengsko-Gorodetsky District in the north, Vokhomsky District of Kostroma Oblast in the east, Pavinsky, Pyshchugsky, Mezhevskoy, and Kologrivsky Districts of Kostroma Oblast in the south, Babushkinsky District in the southwest, and with Nyuksensky District in the west. The area of the district is 7,476 square kilometers (2,886 sq mi). Its administrative center is the town of Nikolsk. Population: 22,414 (2010 census); 26,461 (2002 Census); 31,437 (1989 Soviet census). The population of Nikolsk accounts for 38.0% of the district's total population.

== Geography ==
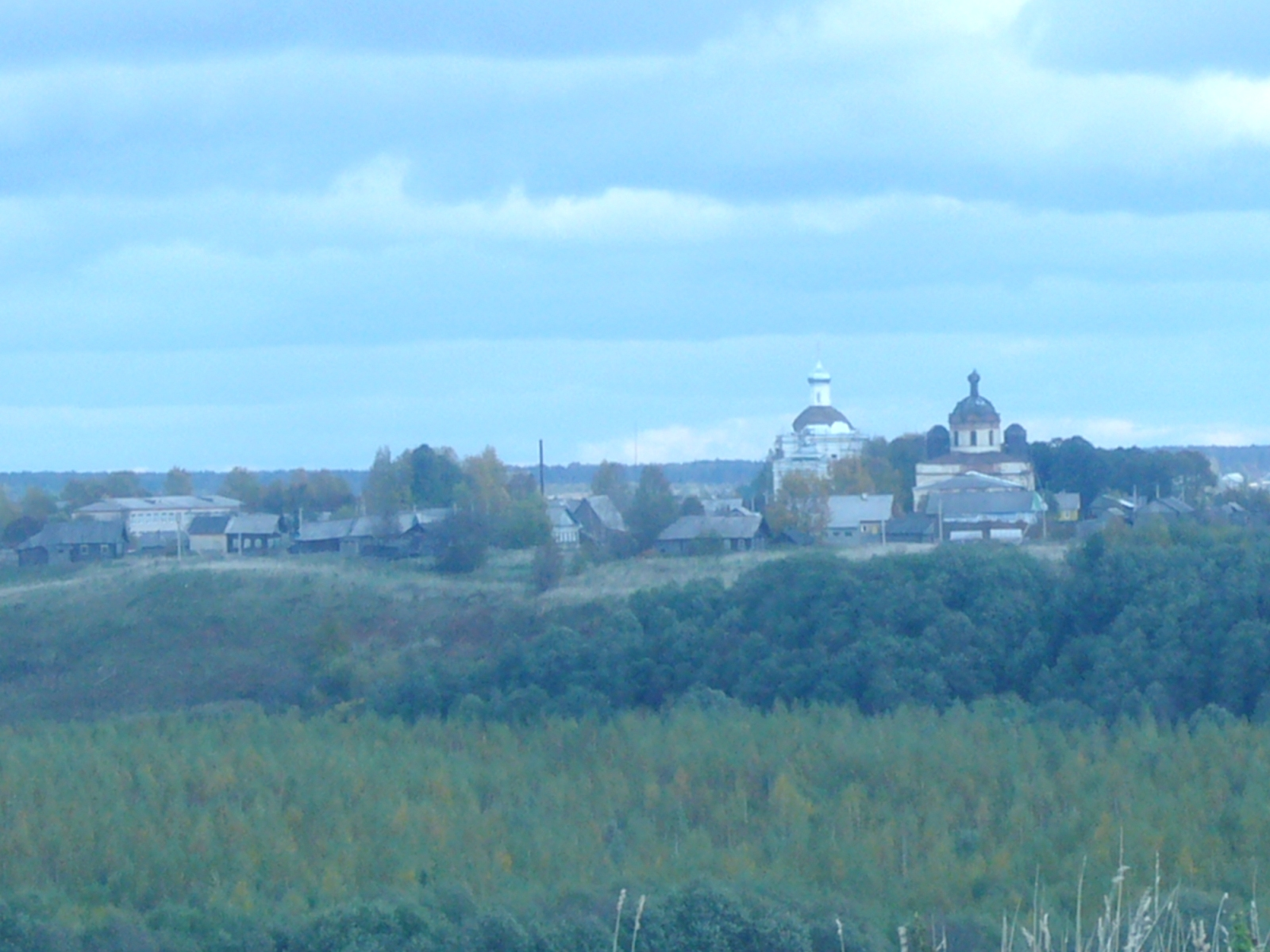
The village of Argunovo in the north of the district

The landscape of the district is dominated by the Northern Ridge chain of hills which separate the basins of the Northern Dvina and the Volga Rivers, or, more generally, the basins of the Arctic Ocean and the Caspian Sea. The rivers in the eastern part of the district drain into the Yug River, which makes a big loop inside the district. The town of Nikolsk is located on the banks of the Yug. The Yug is one of the two sources (along with the Sukhona) of the Northern Dvina. The northern part of the district belongs to the basin of the Sharzhenga River, a left tributary of the Yug. The southwestern part of the district belongs to the basin of the Unzha River, a left tributary of the Volga, and of the Mezha River, a principal (left) tributary of the Unzha. Minor areas in the south and the very east of the district are in the basin of the Vetluga River, another left tributary of the Volga, and its right tributary, the Vokhma. The sources of the Unzha and the Vokhma is located within the district limits.

Considerable areas of the district are covered by coniferous forests.

== History ==
The area was populated by Finnic peoples. In the 14th–15th centuries, during the colonization, it was a disputed territory between the Grand Duchy of Moscow and the Novgorod Republic. Novgorod controlled the major part of the Russian North, and, in particular, all areas along the Sukhona River northeast of Nikolsky District. Moscow controlled Veliky Ustyug, which it inherited from the Vladimir-Suzdal Principality, and the Yug River was the waterway it used to get to Veliky Ustyug. It is known that in 1452 Nikolsk and surrounding areas paid tribute to Novgorod. In the end of the 15th century, Novgorod was overtaken by the Grand Duchy of Moscow, and Nikolsk became one of the key points on the way from Moscow to the White Sea, which until 1703 was the main route for the foreign trade in Russia. In particular, the harbor in Nikolsk was used to transport cargo.

In the course of the administrative reform carried out in 1708 by Peter the Great, the area was included into Archangelgorod Governorate. In 1780, the governorate was abolished and transformed into Vologda Viceroyalty. Simultaneously, Nikolsk became the seat of an uyezd and was granted town rights. The viceroyalty was abolished in 1796 and Nikolsky Uyezd was transferred to Vologda Governorate. In 1918, the area was transferred to the newly established Northern Dvina Governorate with the administrative center located in Veliky Ustyug. In 1924, the uyezds were abolished in favor of the new divisions, the districts (raions).

On June 10, 1924, Nikolsky District was established. In 1929, Northern Dvina Governorate was merged into Northern Krai. The krai consisted of five okrugs, one of which, Northern Dvina Okrug, had the administrative center is Veliky Ustyug. Nikolsky District became a part of Northern Dvina Okrug. In July 1930, the okrugs were abolished, and the districts were directly subordinated to Northern Krai. In 1936, Northern Krai was transformed into Northern Oblast, and in 1937, Northern Oblast itself was split into Arkhangelsk Oblast and Vologda Oblast. Nikolsky District remained in Vologda Oblast ever since.

On June 10, 1924, Roslyatinsky District was established, with the administrative center in the selo of Roslyatino. On July 30, 1931, it was merged into Ledengsky District, then in 1935 it was re-established, and on November 12, 1960, Roslyatinsky District was abolished again with its area divided between Babushkinsky and Nikolsky Districts.

Until the 1990s, Nikolsky District was one of the most remote areas of Vologda Oblast. Nikolsk was connected by roads to Veliky Ustyug and Vologda, but traveling from Nikolsk to Moscow required a detour to Vologda. The problem was solved when the road to Pyshchug and Manturovo, both in Kostroma Oblast, was built in the end of the 1990s.

== Economy ==
=== Industry ===
Timber industry is the basis of the economy of the district. Food industry, including meat, milk, and bread production, is also present. There is also linum textile production.

=== Agriculture ===
There are about a hundred farms in the district, with not more than a dozen of them being large-scale. The main activity of the farms is cattle breeding, pork production, and linum growing. Most of the crops are grown to feed cattle.

=== Transportation ===
Paved roads connect Nikolsk with Pyshchug and Manturovo in the south, crossing the border with Kostroma Oblast, with Totma in the west, and with Veliky Ustyug via Kichmengsky Gorodok in the north. There is regular bus service on these roads, as well as local bus traffic originating from Nikolsk.

The Yug is navigable downstream from Nikolsk; however, there is no passenger navigation.

There are no railroads operated by the Russian Railways in the district, and the closest railway stations with regular passenger service are Kotlas in Arkhangelsk Oblast and Sharya in Kostroma Oblast. There were plans to extend the Monza Railroad—a railroad built for timber transport, which runs along the border of Vologda and Kostroma Oblasts—to Nikolsk; however, these plans were never realized. Several kilometers of tracks at the eastern end of the Monza Railroad, including Kema terminal station, are located within the district.

== Culture and recreation ==
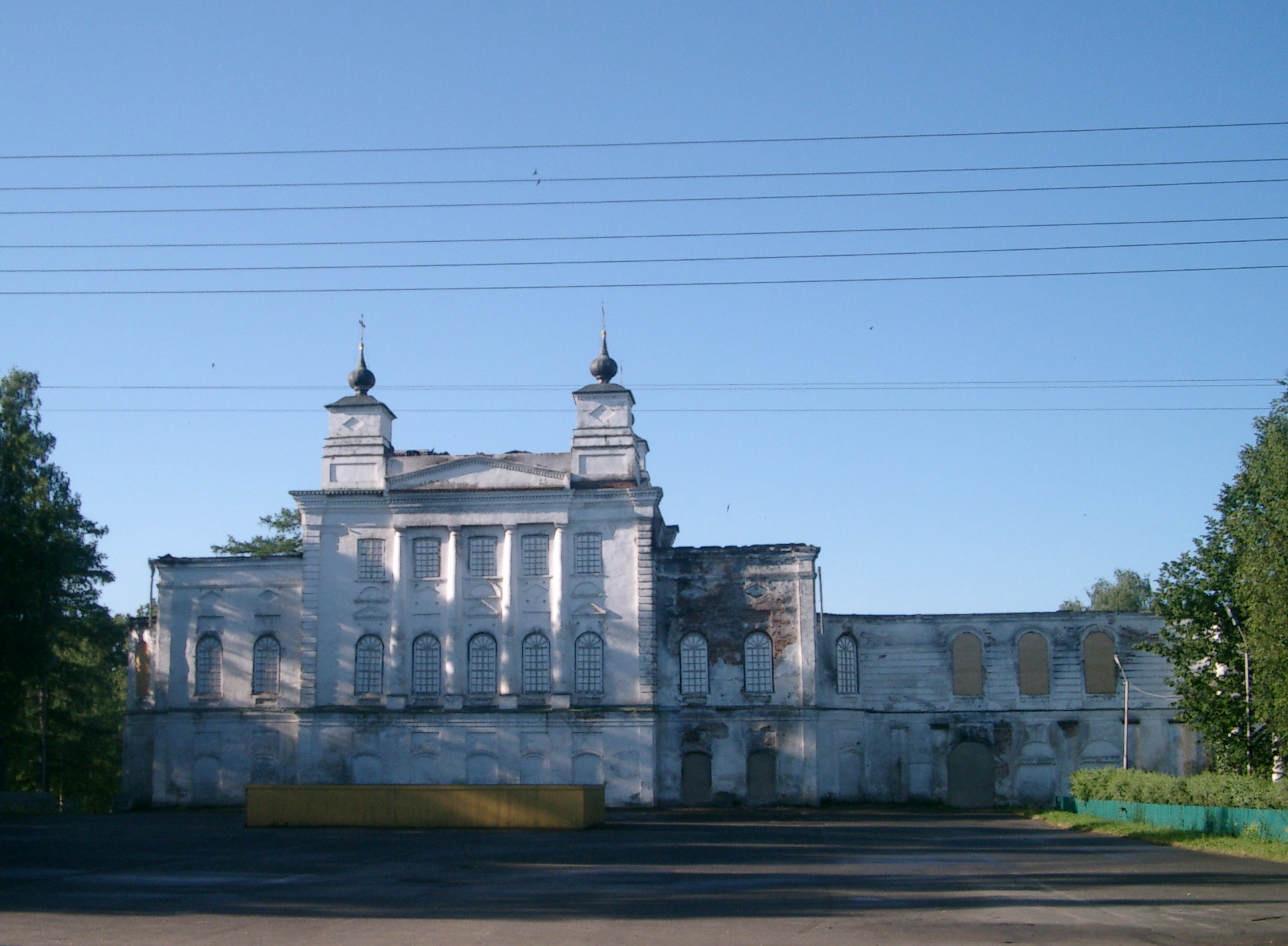
The Presentation Cathedral (1780-1833) in Nikolsk after the 2005 fire

The district contains 137 objects (60 of them located in Nikolsk) classified as cultural and historical heritage of local importance. Most of these are farms, town houses, and churches built prior to 1917.

Author Alexander Yashin, associated with the Village Prose movement in Russian literature, was born in 1913 in what is now Nikolsky District, got his education in Nikolsk, and lived in Nikolsk until the mid-1930s. The only state museum in the district is the Memorial Museum of Alexander Yashin, located in Nikolsk. The museum occupies the house which belonged to Yashin's parents, as well as the former house of Yashin.
