= Fyodorovsky (inhabited locality) =

Fyodorovsky (Russian: Фёдоровский; masculine), Fyodorovskaya (Фёдоровская; feminine), or Fyodorovskoye (Фёдоровское; neuter) is the name of several inhabited localities in Russia.

== Modern localities ==
=== Bryansk Oblast ===
As of 2010, one rural locality in Bryansk Oblast bears this name:

- Fyodorovskoye, Bryansk Oblast, a selo in Fyodorovsky Selsoviet of Rognedinsky District

=== Ivanovo Oblast ===
As of 2010, two rural localities in Ivanovo Oblast bear this name:

- Fyodorovskoye, Ivanovo Oblast, a village in Ilyinsky District
- Fyodorovskaya, Ivanovo Oblast, a village in Lukhsky District

=== Kaluga Oblast ===
As of 2010, one rural locality in Kaluga Oblast bears this name:

- Fyodorovskoye, Kaluga Oblast, a selo in Zhukovsky District

=== Khanty-Mansi Autonomous Okrug ===
As of 2010, one urban locality in Khanty-Mansi Autonomous Okrug bears this name:

- Fyodorovsky, Khanty-Mansi Autonomous Okrug, an urban-type settlement in Surgutsky District

=== Kirov Oblast ===
As of 2010, one rural locality in Kirov Oblast bears this name:

- Fyodorovskaya, Kirov Oblast, a village in Oktyabrsky Rural Okrug of Podosinovsky District

=== Kostroma Oblast ===
As of 2012, seven rural localities in Kostroma Oblast bear this name:

- Fyodorovsky, Kostroma Oblast, a khutor under the administrative jurisdiction of Ponazyrevo Urban Settlement (urban-type settlement) of Ponazyrevsky District
- Fyodorovskoye, Chukhlomsky District, Kostroma Oblast, a village in Nozhkinskoye Settlement of Chukhlomsky District
- Fyodorovskoye, Orekhovskoye Settlement, Galichsky District, Kostroma Oblast, a village in Orekhovskoye Settlement of Galichsky District
- Fyodorovskoye, Orekhovskoye Settlement, Galichsky District, Kostroma Oblast, a village in Orekhovskoye Settlement of Galichsky District
- Fyodorovskoye, Makaryevsky District, Kostroma Oblast, a village in Shemyatinskoye Settlement of Makaryevsky District
- Fyodorovskoye, Mezhevskoy District, Kostroma Oblast, a village in Georgiyevskoye Settlement of Mezhevskoy District
- Fyodorovskoye, Nerekhtsky District, Kostroma Oblast, a selo in Prigorodnoye Settlement of Nerekhtsky District

=== Leningrad Oblast ===
As of 2010, two rural localities in Leningrad Oblast bear this name:

- Fyodorovskoye, Leningrad Oblast, a village in Fyodorovskoye Settlement Municipal Formation of Tosnensky District
- Fyodorovskaya, Leningrad Oblast, a village in Vinnitskoye Settlement Municipal Formation of Podporozhsky District

=== Moscow Oblast ===
As of 2010, ten rural localities in Moscow Oblast bear this name:

- Fyodorovskoye, Dmitrovsky District, Moscow Oblast, a village in Kostinskoye Rural Settlement of Dmitrovsky District
- Fyodorovskoye, Lukhovitsky District, Moscow Oblast, a village in Gazoprovodskoye Rural Settlement of Lukhovitsky District
- Fyodorovskoye, Mozhaysky District, Moscow Oblast, a village under the administrative jurisdiction of the work settlement of Uvarovka, Mozhaysky District, Moscow Oblast
- Fyodorovskoye, Naro-Fominsky District, Moscow Oblast, a village in Novofyodorovskoye Rural Settlement of Naro-Fominsky District
- Fyodorovskoye, Pushkinsky District, Moscow Oblast, a village in Tsarevskoye Rural Settlement of Pushkinsky District
- Fyodorovskoye, Sergiyevo-Posadsky District, Moscow Oblast, a village under the administrative jurisdiction of the work settlement of Bogorodskoye, Sergiyevo-Posadsky District
- Fyodorovskoye, Stupinsky District, Moscow Oblast, a selo in Aksinyinskoye Rural Settlement of Stupinsky District
- Fyodorovskoye, Taldomsky District, Moscow Oblast, a village in Kvashenkovskoye Rural Settlement of Taldomsky District
- Fyodorovskoye, Volokolamsky District, Moscow Oblast, a selo in Yaropoletskoye Rural Settlement of Volokolamsky District
- Fyodorovskaya, Moscow Oblast, a village in Dmitrovskoye Rural Settlement of Shatursky District

=== Nizhny Novgorod Oblast ===
As of 2010, three rural localities in Nizhny Novgorod Oblast bear this name:

- Fyodorovsky, Nizhny Novgorod Oblast, a pochinok in Gorevsky Selsoviet of Urensky District
- Fyodorovskoye, Gorodetsky District, Nizhny Novgorod Oblast, a village in Timiryazevsky Selsoviet of Gorodetsky District
- Fyodorovskoye, Vetluzhsky District, Nizhny Novgorod Oblast, a village in Kruttsovsky Selsoviet of Vetluzhsky District

=== Novosibirsk Oblast ===
As of 2010, one rural locality in Novosibirsk Oblast bears this name:

- Fyodorovsky, Novosibirsk Oblast, a settlement in Suzunsky District

=== Orenburg Oblast ===
As of 2010, one rural locality in Orenburg Oblast bears this name:

- Fyodorovsky, Orenburg Oblast, a khutor in Krasnooktyabrsky Selsoviet of Oktyabrsky District

=== Pskov Oblast ===
As of 2010, four rural localities in Pskov Oblast bear this name:

- Fyodorovskoye, Loknyansky District, Pskov Oblast, a village in Loknyansky District
- Fyodorovskoye, Novosokolnichesky District, Pskov Oblast, a village in Novosokolnichesky District
- Fyodorovskoye, Opochetsky District, Pskov Oblast, a village in Opochetsky District
- Fyodorovskoye, Ostrovsky District, Pskov Oblast, a village in Ostrovsky District

=== Ryazan Oblast ===
As of 2010, one rural locality in Ryazan Oblast bears this name:

- Fyodorovskoye, Ryazan Oblast, a selo in Fyodorovsky Rural Okrug of Zakharovsky District

=== Smolensk Oblast ===
As of 2010, three rural localities in Smolensk Oblast bear this name:

- Fyodorovskoye, Roslavlsky District, Smolensk Oblast, a village in Astapkovichskoye Rural Settlement of Roslavlsky District
- Fyodorovskoye, Ugransky District, Smolensk Oblast, a village under the administrative jurisdiction of Ugranskoye Urban Settlement of Ugransky District
- Fyodorovskoye, Vyazemsky District, Smolensk Oblast, a village in Novoselskoye Rural Settlement of Vyazemsky District, Smolensk Oblast

=== Stavropol Krai ===
As of 2010, one rural locality in Stavropol Krai bears this name:

- Fyodorovsky, Stavropol Krai, a khutor under the administrative jurisdiction of the town of Zelenokumsk, Sovetsky District

=== Republic of Tatarstan ===
As of 2010, two rural localities in the Republic of Tatarstan bear this name:

- Fyodorovsky, Republic of Tatarstan, a settlement in Aksubayevsky District
- Fyodorovskoye, Republic of Tatarstan, a selo in Kaybitsky District

=== Tver Oblast ===
As of 2010, six rural localities in Tver Oblast bear this name:

- Fyodorovskoye, Kalininsky District, Tver Oblast, a village in Kalininsky District
- Fyodorovskoye, Kalyazinsky District, Tver Oblast, a village in Kalyazinsky District
- Fyodorovskoye, Kashinsky District, Tver Oblast, a village in Kashinsky District
- Fyodorovskoye, Konakovsky District, Tver Oblast, a village in Konakovsky District
- Fyodorovskoye, Sonkovsky District, Tver Oblast, a village in Sonkovsky District
- Fyodorovskoye, Zubtsovsky District, Tver Oblast, a village in Zubtsovsky District

=== Vladimir Oblast ===
As of 2010, five rural localities in Vladimir Oblast bear this name:

- Fyodorovskoye, Alexandrovsky District, Vladimir Oblast, a village in Alexandrovsky District
- Fyodorovskoye, Kirzhachsky District, Vladimir Oblast, a village in Kirzhachsky District
- Fyodorovskoye, Suzdalsky District, Vladimir Oblast, a selo in Suzdalsky District
- Fyodorovskoye (Simskoye Rural Settlement), Yuryev-Polsky District, Vladimir Oblast, a selo in Yuryev-Polsky District; municipally, a part of Simskoye Rural Settlement of that district
- Fyodorovskoye (Nebylovskoye Rural Settlement), Yuryev-Polsky District, Vladimir Oblast, a selo in Yuryev-Polsky District; municipally, a part of Nebylovskoye Rural Settlement of that district

=== Vologda Oblast ===
As of 2010, ten rural localities in Vologda Oblast bear this name:

- Fyodorovskoye, Kharovsky District, Vologda Oblast, a village in Kubinsky Selsoviet of Kharovsky District
- Fyodorovskoye, Ustyuzhensky District, Vologda Oblast, a village in Persky Selsoviet of Ustyuzhensky District
- Fyodorovskoye, Velikoustyugsky District, Vologda Oblast, a village in Shemogodsky Selsoviet of Velikoustyugsky District
- Fyodorovskaya, Belozersky District, Vologda Oblast, a village in Gulinsky Selsoviet of Belozersky District
- Fyodorovskaya, Kharovsky District, Vologda Oblast, a village in Kharovsky Selsoviet of Kharovsky District
- Fyodorovskaya, Totemsky District, Vologda Oblast, a village in Pogorelovsky Selsoviet of Totemsky District
- Fyodorovskaya, Ust-Kubinsky District, Vologda Oblast, a village in Troitsky Selsoviet of Ust-Kubinsky District
- Fyodorovskaya, Vashkinsky District, Vologda Oblast, a village in Andreyevsky Selsoviet of Vashkinsky District
- Fyodorovskaya, Velikoustyugsky District, Vologda Oblast, a village in Yudinsky Selsoviet of Velikoustyugsky District
- Fyodorovskaya, Vytegorsky District, Vologda Oblast, a village in Ankhimovsky Selsoviet of Vytegorsky District

=== Voronezh Oblast ===
As of 2010, one rural locality in Voronezh Oblast bears this name:

- Fyodorovsky, Voronezh Oblast, a khutor in Sredneikoretskoye Rural Settlement of Liskinsky District

=== Yaroslavl Oblast ===
As of 2010, seven rural localities in Yaroslavl Oblast bear this name:

- Fyodorovskoye, Danilovsky District, Yaroslavl Oblast, a village in Pokrovsky Rural Okrug of Danilovsky District
- Fyodorovskoye, Gavrilov-Yamsky District, Yaroslavl Oblast, a village in Zayachye-Kholmsky Rural Okrug of Gavrilov-Yamsky District
- Fyodorovskoye, Rostovsky District, Yaroslavl Oblast, a village in Moseytsevsky Rural Okrug of Rostovsky District
- Fyodorovskoye, Nazarovsky Rural Okrug, Rybinsky District, Yaroslavl Oblast, a village in Nazarovsky Rural Okrug of Rybinsky District
- Fyodorovskoye, Shashkovsky Rural Okrug, Rybinsky District, Yaroslavl Oblast, a village in Shashkovsky Rural Okrug of Rybinsky District
- Fyodorovskoye, Lyutovsky Rural Okrug, Yaroslavsky District, Yaroslavl Oblast, a village in Lyutovsky Rural Okrug of Yaroslavsky District
- Fyodorovskoye, Ryutnevsky Rural Okrug, Yaroslavsky District, Yaroslavl Oblast, a selo in Ryutnevsky Rural Okrug of Yaroslavsky District

== Abolished localities ==
- Fyodorovskoye, Ponazyrevsky District, Kostroma Oblast, a village in Ponazyrevsky Selsoviet of Ponazyrevsky District of Kostroma Oblast; abolished on August 30, 2004
