= Alexino =

Alexino may refer to the following rural localities in Russia:

- Alexino, Petushinsky District, Vladimir Oblast
- Alexino, Yuryev-Polsky District, Vladimir Oblast
- Alexino, Novlenskoye Rural Settlement, Vologodsky District, Vologda Oblast
- Alexino, Semyonkovskoye Rural Settlement, Vologodsky District, Vologda Oblast
- Alexino, Staroselskoye Rural Settlement, Vologodsky District, Vologda Oblast
