= Podolets =

Podolets (Russian: Подолец) is the name of several rural localities in Russia:

- Podolets, Ivanovo Oblast, a selo in Gavrilovo-Posadsky District of Ivanovo Oblast
- Podolets, Kostroma Oblast, a village in Minskoye Settlement of Kostromskoy District of Kostroma Oblast
- Podolets, Nizhny Novgorod Oblast, a village in Zinyakovsky Selsoviet of Gorodetsky District of Nizhny Novgorod Oblast
- Podolets, Vladimir Oblast, a selo in Yuryev-Polsky District of Vladimir Oblast
- Podolets, Sheksninsky District, Vologda Oblast, a village in Ugolsky Selsoviet of Sheksninsky District of Vologda Oblast
- Podolets, Vologodsky District, Vologda Oblast, a village in Novlensky Selsoviet of Vologodsky District of Vologda Oblast
