= Dobrynskoye (rural locality) =

Dobrynskoye is the name of several rural localities in Russia:

- Dobrynskoye, Suzdalsky District, Vladimir Oblast
- Dobrynskoye, Yuryev-Polsky District, Vladimir Oblast
- Dobrynskoye, Vologda Oblast
