= Bogdanovsky rybopitomnik =

Bogdanovsky rybopitomnik Богдановский рыбопитомник
- Selo
- Location within Vladimir Oblast Location within Russia
- Coordinates: 56°28′N 40°01′E
- Country: Russia
- Region: Vladimir Oblast
- District: Yuryev-Polsky District
- Time zone: UTC+3:00

Bogdanovsky rybopitomnik (Russian: Богдановский рыбопитомник) is a rural locality (a selo) in Nebylovskoye Rural Settlement, Yuryev-Polsky District, Vladimir Oblast, Russia. The population was 5 as of 2010.

== Geography ==
It is located on the Irmes River, 18 km north from Nebyloye, 43 km east from Yuryev-Polsky.
