= Berezniki (disambiguation) =

Berezniki is the second-largest city in Perm Krai, Russia.

Berezniki may also refer to the following rural localities in Russia:

- Berezniki, Permsky District, Perm Krai
- Berezniki, Sobinsky District, Vladimir Oblast
- Berezniki, Yuryev-Polsky District, Vladimir Oblast
