= Starnikovo =

Starnikovo Старниково
- Selo
- Location within Vladimir Oblast Location within Russia
- Coordinates: 56°42′N 39°26′E
- Country: Russia
- Region: Vladimir Oblast
- District: Yuryev-Polsky District
- Time zone: UTC+3:00

Starnikovo (Russian: Старниково) is a rural locality (a selo) in Simskoye Rural Settlement, Yuryev-Polsky District, Vladimir Oblast, Russia. The population was 10 as of 2010.

== Geography ==
Starnikovo is located on the Shosa River, 31 km northwest of Yuryev-Polsky (the district's administrative centre) by road. Peremilovo is the nearest rural locality.
