= Volstvinovo =

Volstvinovo Волствиново
- Selo
- Church in the village of Volstvinovo

- Location within Vladimir Oblast Location within Russia
- Coordinates: 56°35′N 39°34′E
- Country: Russia
- Region: Vladimir Oblast
- District: Yuryev-Polsky District
- Time zone: UTC+3:00

Volstvinovo (Russian: Волствиново) is a rural locality (a selo) in Krasnoselskoye Rural Settlement, Yuryev-Polsky District, Vladimir Oblast, Russia. The population was 7 as of 2010.

== Geography ==
Volstvinovo is located 14 km northwest of Yuryev-Polsky (the district's administrative centre) by road. Tenki is the nearest rural locality.
