= Semyinskoye =

Semyinskoye Семьинское
- Selo
- Location within Vladimir Oblast Location within Russia
- Coordinates: 56°21′N 39°45′E
- Country: Russia
- Region: Vladimir Oblast
- District: Yuryev-Polsky District
- Time zone: UTC+3:00

Semyinskoye (Russian: Семьинское) is a rural locality (a selo) in Krasnoselskoye Rural Settlement, Yuryev-Polsky District, Vladimir Oblast, Russia. The population was 284 as of 2010.

== Geography ==
Semyinskoye is located 18 km south of Yuryev-Polsky (the district's administrative centre) by road. Tursino is the nearest rural locality.
