= Kalinovka, Vladimir Oblast =

Kalinovka Калиновка
- Selo
- Location within Vladimir Oblast Location within Russia
- Coordinates: 56°28′N 39°44′E
- Country: Russia
- Region: Vladimir Oblast
- District: Yuryev-Polsky District
- Time zone: UTC+3:00

Kalinovka (Russian: Калиновка) is a rural locality (a selo) in Krasnoselskoye Rural Settlement, Yuryev-Polsky District, Vladimir Oblast, Russia. The population was 167 as of 2010.

== Geography ==
Kalinovka is located 4 km east of Yuryev-Polsky (the district's administrative centre) by road. Kumino is the nearest rural locality.
