= Kuchki =

Kuchki Кучки
- Selo
- Location within Vladimir Oblast Location within Russia
- Coordinates: 56°25′N 39°39′E
- Country: Russia
- Region: Vladimir Oblast
- District: Yuryev-Polsky District
- Time zone: UTC+3:00

Kuchki (Russian: Кучки) is a rural locality (a selo) in Krasnoselskoye Rural Settlement, Yuryev-Polsky District, Vladimir Oblast, Russia. The population was 109 as of 2010.

== Geography ==
Kuchki is located 11 km south of Yuryev-Polsky (the district's administrative centre) by road. Sosnovy Bor is the nearest rural locality.
