= Podlesny, Vladimir Oblast =

Podlesny Подлесный
- Selo
- Location within Vladimir Oblast Location within Russia
- Coordinates: 56°44′N 39°38′E
- Country: Russia
- Region: Vladimir Oblast
- District: Yuryev-Polsky District
- Time zone: UTC+3:00

Podlesny (Russian: Подлесный) is a rural locality (a selo) in Simskoye Rural Settlement, Yuryev-Polsky District, Vladimir Oblast, Russia. The population was 1 as of 2010.

== Geography ==
Podlesny is located on the Seleksha River, 29 km north of Yuryev-Polsky (the district's administrative centre) by road. Zaborye is the nearest rural locality.
