= Karelskaya Slobodka =

Karelskaya Slobodka Карельская Слободка
- Selo
- Location within Vladimir Oblast Location within Russia
- Coordinates: 56°23′N 40°13′E
- Country: Russia
- Region: Vladimir Oblast
- District: Yuryev-Polsky District
- Time zone: UTC+3:00

Karelskaya Slobodka (Russian: Карельская Слободка) is a rural locality (a selo) in Nebylovskoye Rural Settlement, Yuryev-Polsky District, Vladimir Oblast, Russia. The population was 9 as of 2010.

== Geography ==
Karelskaya Slobodka is located on the Urshma River, 46 km southeast of Yuryev-Polsky (the district's administrative centre) by road. Semyonovskoye-Sovetskoye is the nearest rural locality.
