= Nesterovo, Vladimir Oblast =

Nesterovo Нестерово
- Selo
- Location within Vladimir Oblast Location within Russia
- Coordinates: 56°43′N 39°27′E
- Country: Russia
- Region: Vladimir Oblast
- District: Yuryev-Polsky District
- Time zone: UTC+3:00

Nesterovo (Russian: Нестерово) is a rural locality (a selo) in Simskoye Rural Settlement, Yuryev-Polsky District, Vladimir Oblast, Russia. The population was 108 as of 2010.

== Geography ==
Nesterovo is located on the Shosa River, 31 km northwest of Yuryev-Polsky (the district's administrative centre) by road. Starnikovo is the nearest rural locality.
