= Lednevo =

Lednevo Леднево
- Location within Vladimir Oblast Location within Russia
- Coordinates: 56°29′N 39°51′E
- Country: Russia
- Region: Vladimir Oblast
- District: Yuryev-Polsky District
- Time zone: UTC+3:00

Lednevo (Russian: Леднево) is a rural locality (a station) in Krasnoselskoye Rural Settlement, Yuryev-Polsky District, Vladimir Oblast, Russia. The population was 11 as of 2010.

== Geography ==
It is located 15 km east from Yuryev-Polsky.
