= Lykovo, Vladimir Oblast =

Lykovo Лыково
- Selo
- Location within Vladimir Oblast Location within Russia
- Coordinates: 56°22′N 39°56′E
- Country: Russia
- Region: Vladimir Oblast
- District: Yuryev-Polsky District
- Time zone: UTC+3:00

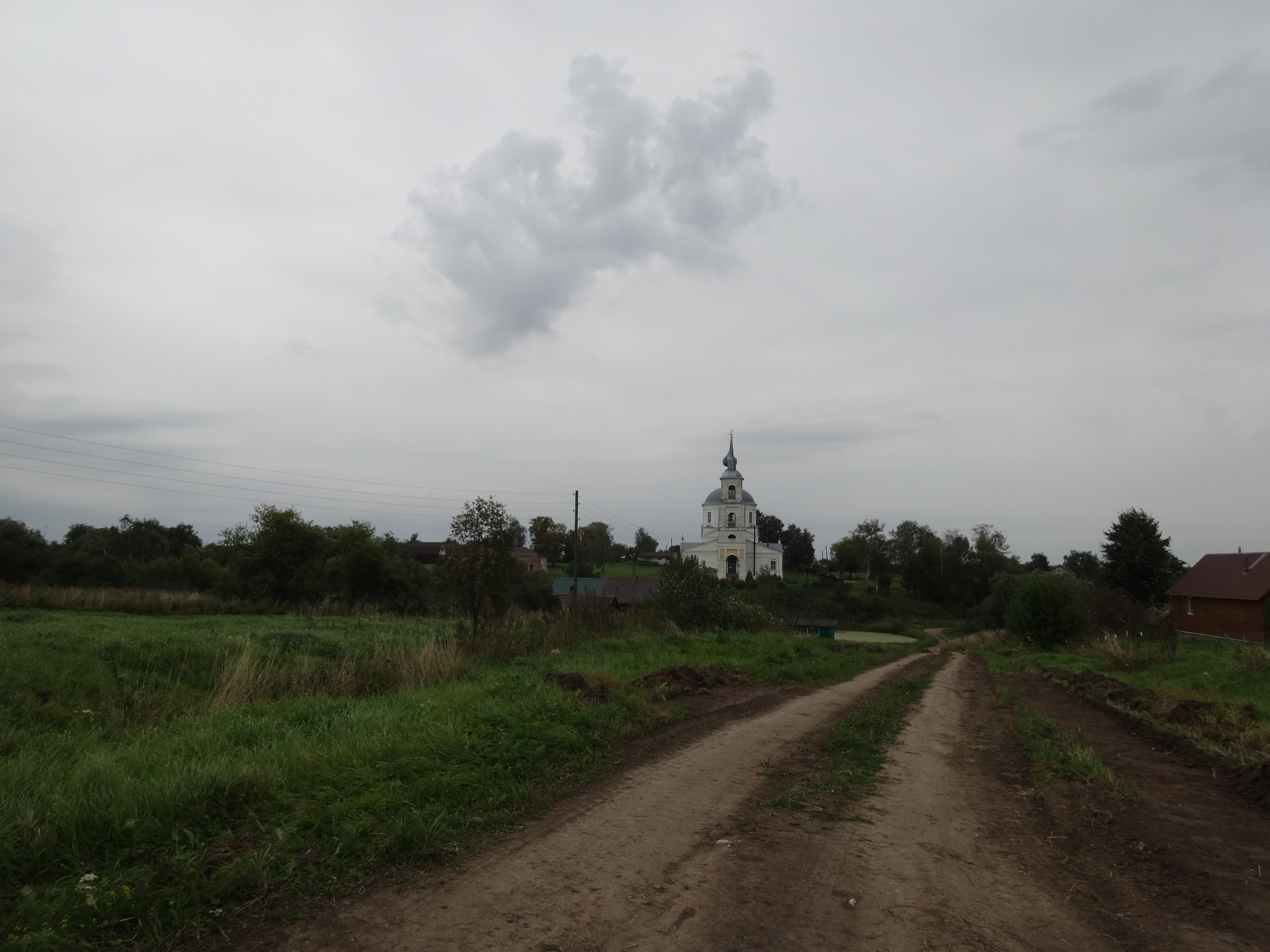

Lykovo (Russian: Лыково) is a rural locality (a selo) in Nebylovskoye Rural Settlement, Yuryev-Polsky District, Vladimir Oblast, Russia. The population was 125 as of 2010.

== Geography ==
Lykovo is located 33 km southeast of Yuryev-Polsky (the district's administrative centre) by road. Sluda is the nearest rural locality.
