= Ryabinki =

Ryabinki Рябинки
- Village
- Location within Vladimir Oblast Location within Russia
- Coordinates: 56°27′N 39°51′E
- Country: Russia
- Region: Vladimir Oblast
- District: Yuryev-Polsky District
- Time zone: UTC+3:00

Ryabinki (Russian: Рябинки) is a rural locality (a village) in Nebylovskoye Rural Settlement, Yuryev-Polsky District, Vladimir Oblast, Russia. The population was 29 as of 2010.

== Geography ==
Ryabinki is located 13 km southeast of Yuryev-Polsky (the district's administrative centre) by road. Voskresenskoye is the nearest rural locality.
