= Fyodorovskoye (Nebylovskoye Rural Settlement), Yuryev-Polsky District, Vladimir Oblast =

Fyodorovskoye Фёдоровское
- Selo
- Location within Vladimir Oblast Location within Russia
- Coordinates: 56°25′N 39°55′E
- Country: Russia
- Region: Vladimir Oblast
- District: Yuryev-Polsky District
- Time zone: UTC+3:00

Fyodorovskoye (Russian: Фёдоровское) is a rural locality (a selo) in Nebylovskoye Rural Settlement, Yuryev-Polsky District, Vladimir Oblast, Russia. The population was 631 as of 2010.

== Geography ==
It is located on the Toma River, 9 km north-west from Nebyloye, 18 km south-east from Yuryev-Polsky.
