= Lednevo (selo), Yuryev-Polsky District, Vladimir Oblast =

Lednevo Леднево
- Selo
- Location within Vladimir Oblast Location within Russia
- Coordinates: 56°28′N 39°49′E
- Country: Russia
- Region: Vladimir Oblast
- District: Yuryev-Polsky District
- Time zone: UTC+3:00

Lednevo (Russian: Леднево) is a rural locality (a selo) in Nebylovskoye Rural Settlement, Yuryev-Polsky District, Vladimir Oblast, Russia. The population was 39 as of 2010.

== Geography ==
Lednevo is located 11 km southeast of Yuryev-Polsky (the district's administrative centre) by road. Ryabinki is the nearest rural locality.
