= Nenashevskoye =

Nenashevskoye Ненашевское
- Selo
- Location within Vladimir Oblast Location within Russia
- Coordinates: 56°32′N 39°42′E
- Country: Russia
- Region: Vladimir Oblast
- District: Yuryev-Polsky District
- Time zone: UTC+3:00

Nenashevskoye (Russian: Ненашевское) is a rural locality (a selo) in Krasnoselskoye Rural Settlement, Yuryev-Polsky District, Vladimir Oblast, Russia. The population was 27 as of 2010.

== Geography ==
Nenashevskoye is located 5 km north of Yuryev-Polsky (the district's administrative centre) by road. Krasnoye is the nearest rural locality.
