= Maloluchinskoye =

Maloluchinskoye Малолучинское
- Selo
- Location within Vladimir Oblast Location within Russia
- Coordinates: 56°31′N 39°51′E
- Country: Russia
- Region: Vladimir Oblast
- District: Yuryev-Polsky District
- Time zone: UTC+3:00

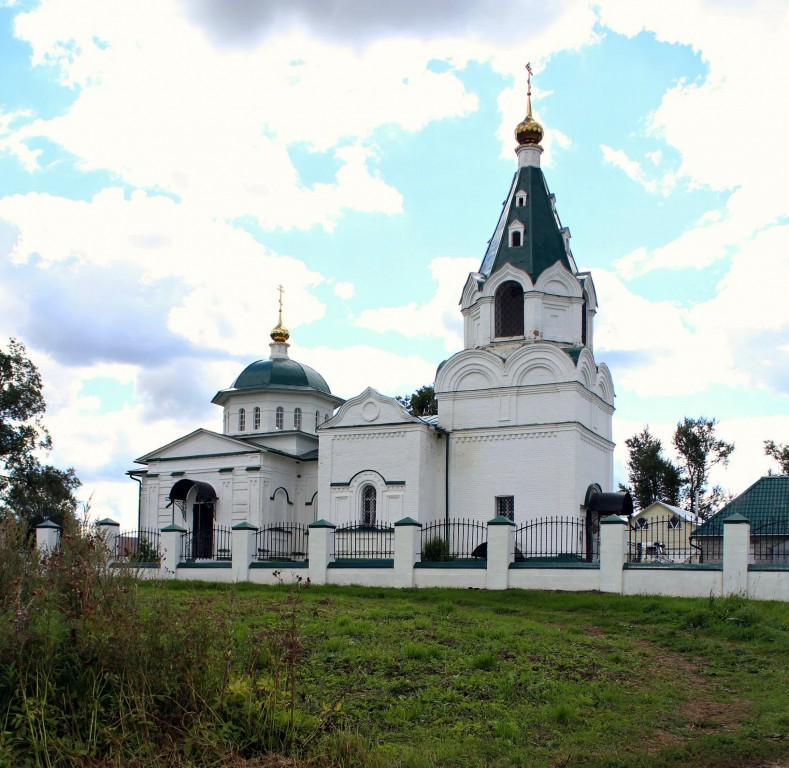

Maloluchinskoye (Russian: Малолучинское) is a rural locality (a selo) in Krasnoselskoye Rural Settlement, Yuryev-Polsky District, Vladimir Oblast, Russia. The population was 46 as of 2010.

== Geography ==
Maloluchinskoye is located 14 km east of Yuryev-Polsky (the district's administrative centre) by road. Shipilovo is the nearest rural locality.
