= Parsha, Vladimir Oblast =

Parsha Парша
- Selo
- Location within Vladimir Oblast Location within Russia
- Coordinates: 56°33′N 39°53′E
- Country: Russia
- Region: Vladimir Oblast
- District: Yuryev-Polsky District
- Time zone: UTC+3:00

Parsha (Russian: Парша) is a rural locality (a selo) in Krasnoselskoye Rural Settlement, Yuryev-Polsky District, Vladimir Oblast, Russia. The population was 10 as of 2010.

== Geography ==
Parsha is located on the Lipnya River, 23 km northeast from Yuryev-Polsky (the district's administrative centre) by road. Shipilovo is the nearest rural locality.
