= Kosagovo =

Kosagovo Косагово
- Selo
- Location within Vladimir Oblast Location within Russia
- Coordinates: 56°20′N 39°56′E
- Country: Russia
- Region: Vladimir Oblast
- District: Yuryev-Polsky District
- Time zone: UTC+3:00

Kosagovo (Russian: Косагово) is a rural locality (a selo) in Nebylovskoye Rural Settlement, Yuryev-Polsky District, Vladimir Oblast, Russia. The population was 11 as of 2010.

== Geography ==
Kosagovo is located 32 km southeast of Yuryev-Polsky (the district's administrative centre) by road. Lykovo is the nearest rural locality.
