= Baskaki, Yuryev-Polsky District, Vladimir Oblast =

Baskaki Баскаки
- Village
- Location within Vladimir Oblast Location within Russia
- Coordinates: 56°26′N 40°00′E
- Country: Russia
- Region: Vladimir Oblast
- District: Yuryev-Polsky District
- Time zone: UTC+3:00

Baskaki (Russian: Баскаки) is a rural locality (a village) in Nebylovskoye Rural Settlement, Yuryev-Polsky District, Vladimir Oblast, Russia. The population was 17 as of 2010.

== Geography ==
Baskaki is located on the Irmes River, 42 km southeast of Yuryev-Polsky (the district's administrative centre) by road. Dergayevo is the nearest rural locality.
