= Drozdovo =

Drozdovo Дроздово
- Village
- Location within Vladimir Oblast Location within Russia
- Coordinates: 56°28′N 39°36′E
- Country: Russia
- Region: Vladimir Oblast
- District: Yuryev-Polsky District

Area
  - Total: 1.22 km^{2} (0.47 sq mi)
  - Water: 0.04 km^{2} (0.015 sq mi)
- Time zone: UTC+3:00

Drozdovo (Russian: Дроздово) is a rural locality (a village) in Krasnoselskoye Rural Settlement, Yuryev-Polsky District, Vladimir Oblast, Russia. The population was 111 as of 2010.

== Geography ==
Drozdovo is located 6 km southwest of Yuryev-Polsky (the district's administrative centre) by road. Poyelovo is the nearest rural locality.
