= Afineyevo =

Afineyevo Афинеево
- Selo
- Location within Vladimir Oblast Location within Russia
- Coordinates: 56°31′N 39°33′E
- Country: Russia
- Region: Vladimir Oblast
- District: Yuryev-Polsky District
- Time zone: UTC+3:00

Afineyevo (Russian: Афинеево) is a rural locality (a selo) in Krasnoselskoye Rural Settlement, Yuryev-Polsky District, Vladimir Oblast, Russia. The population was 11 as of 2010.

== Geography ==
Afineyevo is located 9 km (5.6 mi) northwest of Yuryev-Polsky (the district's administrative centre) by road. Kosinskoye is the nearest rural locality.
