= Yeltsy, Yuryev-Polsky District, Vladimir Oblast =

Yeltsy Ельцы
- Selo
- Location within Vladimir Oblast Location within Russia
- Coordinates: 56°25′N 39°49′E
- Country: Russia
- Region: Vladimir Oblast
- District: Yuryev-Polsky District
- Time zone: UTC+3:00

Yeltsy (Russian: Ельцы) is a rural locality (a selo) in Nebylovskoye Rural Settlement, Yuryev-Polsky District, Vladimir Oblast, Russia. The population was 15 as of 2010.

== Geography ==
Yeltsy is located 19 km southeast of Yuryev-Polsky (the district's administrative centre) by road. Voskresenskoye is the nearest rural locality.
