= Shikhobalovo =

Shikhobalovo Шихобалово
- Selo
- Location within Vladimir Oblast Location within Russia
- Coordinates: 56°25′N 40°05′E
- Country: Russia
- Region: Vladimir Oblast
- District: Yuryev-Polsky District
- Time zone: UTC+3:00

Shikhobalovo (Russian: Шихобалово) is a rural locality (a selo) in Nebylovskoye Rural Settlement, Yuryev-Polsky District, Vladimir Oblast, Russia. The population was 993 as of 2010.

== Geography ==
Shikhobalovo is located 36 km southeast of Yuryev-Polsky (the district's administrative centre) by road. Bogdanovskoye is the nearest rural locality.
