= Nikulskoye, Yuryev-Polsky District, Vladimir Oblast =

Nikulskoye Никульское
- Selo
- Location within Vladimir Oblast Location within Russia
- Coordinates: 56°26′N 39°52′E
- Country: Russia
- Region: Vladimir Oblast
- District: Yuryev-Polsky District
- Time zone: UTC+3:00

Nikulskoye (Russian: Никульское) is a rural locality (a selo) in Nebylovskoye Rural Settlement, Yuryev-Polsky District, Vladimir Oblast, Russia. The population was 33 as of 2010.

== Geography ==
Nikulskoye is located on the Vykros River, 15 km southeast from Yuryev-Polsky (the district's administrative centre) by road. Voskresenskoye is the nearest rural locality.
