= Prechistaya Gora =

Prechistaya Gora Пречистая Гора
- Selo
- Location within Vladimir Oblast Location within Russia
- Coordinates: 56°19′N 39°52′E
- Country: Russia
- Region: Vladimir Oblast
- District: Yuryev-Polsky District
- Time zone: UTC+3:00

Prechistaya Gora (Russian: Пречистая Гора) is a rural locality (a selo) in Nebylovskoye Rural Settlement, Yuryev-Polsky District, Vladimir Oblast, Russia. The population was 30 as of 2010.

== Geography ==
Prechistaya Gora is located on the Toma River, 35 km southeast of Yuryev-Polsky (the district's administrative centre) by road. Krasoye Zarechye is the nearest rural locality.
