= Ratislovo =

Ratislovo Ратислово
- Selo
- Location within Vladimir Oblast Location within Russia
- Coordinates: 56°18′N 39°46′E
- Country: Russia
- Region: Vladimir Oblast
- District: Yuryev-Polsky District
- Time zone: UTC+3:00

Ratislovo (Russian: Ратислово) is a rural locality (a selo) in Krasnoselskoye Rural Settlement, Yuryev-Polsky District, Vladimir Oblast, Russia. The population was 82 as of 2010.

== Geography ==
Ratislovo is located 24 km south of Yuryev-Polsky (the district's administrative centre) by road. Avdotyino is the nearest rural locality.
