= Tereshki =

Tereshki Терешки
- Village
- Location within Vladimir Oblast Location within Russia
- Coordinates: 56°19′N 39°49′E
- Country: Russia
- Region: Vladimir Oblast
- District: Yuryev-Polsky District
- Time zone: UTC+3:00

Tereshki (Russian: Терешки) is a rural locality (a village) in Krasnoselskoye Rural Settlement, Yuryev-Polsky District, Vladimir Oblast, Russia. The population was 7 as of 2010.

== Geography ==
Tereshki is located 30 km southeast of Yuryev-Polsky (the district's administrative centre) by road. Turygino is the nearest rural locality.
