= Poyelovo =

Poyelovo Поелово
- Selo
- Location within Vladimir Oblast Location within Russia
- Coordinates: 56°29′N 39°38′E
- Country: Russia
- Region: Vladimir Oblast
- District: Yuryev-Polsky District
- Time zone: UTC+3:00

Poyelovo (Russian: Поелово) is a rural locality (a selo) in Krasnoselskoye Rural Settlement, Yuryev-Polsky District, Vladimir Oblast, Russia. The population was 8 as of 2010.

== Geography ==
Poyelovo is located 4 km (2.5 mi) west of Yuryev-Polsky (the district's administrative centre) by road. Ilyinskoye is the nearest rural locality.
