= Bildino =

Bildino Бильдино
- Village
- Location within Vladimir Oblast Location within Russia
- Coordinates: 56°40′N 39°31′E
- Country: Russia
- Region: Vladimir Oblast
- District: Yuryev-Polsky District
- Time zone: UTC+3:00

Bildino (Russian: Бильдино) is a rural locality (a village) in Simskoye Rural Settlement, Yuryev-Polsky District, Vladimir Oblast, Russia. The population was 4 as of 2010.

== Geography ==
Bildino is located on the Simka River, 26 km (16 mi) north of Yuryev-Polsky (the district's administrative centre) by road. Sima is the nearest rural locality.
