= Kirpichny Zavod =

Kirpichny Zavod Кирпичный Завод
- Selo
- Location within Vladimir Oblast Location within Russia
- Coordinates: 56°27′N 39°39′E
- Country: Russia
- Region: Vladimir Oblast
- District: Yuryev-Polsky District
- Time zone: UTC+3:00

Kirpichny Zavod (Russian: Кирпичный Завод) is a rural locality (a selo) in Krasnoselskoye Rural Settlement, Yuryev-Polsky District, Vladimir Oblast, Russia. The population was 83 as of 2010.

== Geography ==
Kirpichny Zavod is located on the Sega River, 5 km south of Yuryev-Polsky (the district's administrative centre) by road. Yuryev-Polsky is the nearest rural locality.
