= Svaino =

Svaino Сваино
- Selo
- Location within Vladimir Oblast Location within Russia
- Coordinates: 56°40′N 39°50′E
- Country: Russia
- Region: Vladimir Oblast
- District: Yuryev-Polsky District
- Time zone: UTC+3:00

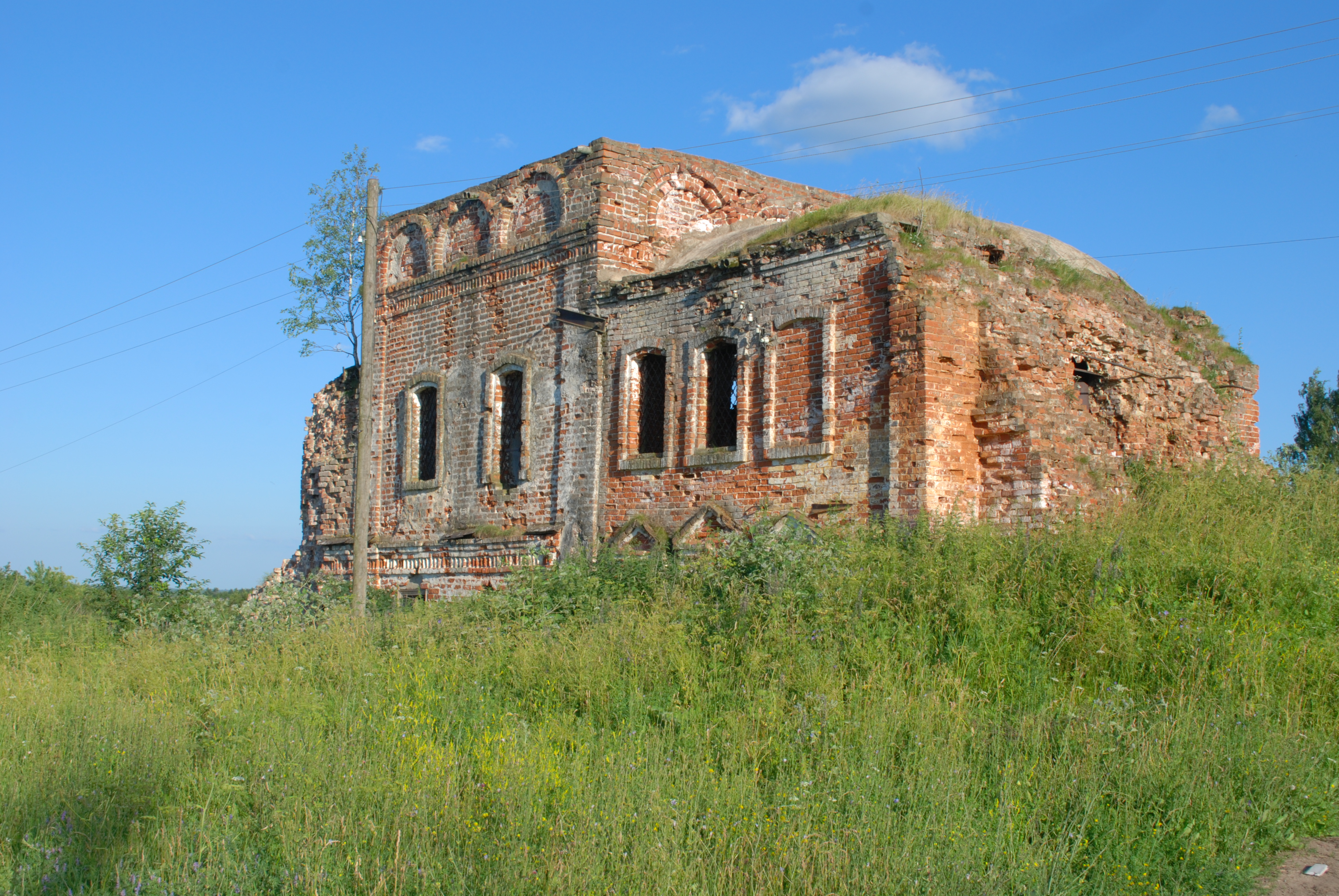
Church of the Sign (Vladimir region, Yuryev-Polsky, village of Svaino)

Svaino (Russian: Сваино) is a rural locality (a selo) in Krasnoselskoye Rural Settlement, Yuryev-Polsky District, Vladimir Oblast, Russia. The population was 68 as of 2010.

== Geography ==
Svaino is located 26 km northeast of Yuryev-Polsky (the district's administrative centre) by road. Khoroshovka is the nearest rural locality.
