= Radovanye =

Radovanye Радованье
- Selo
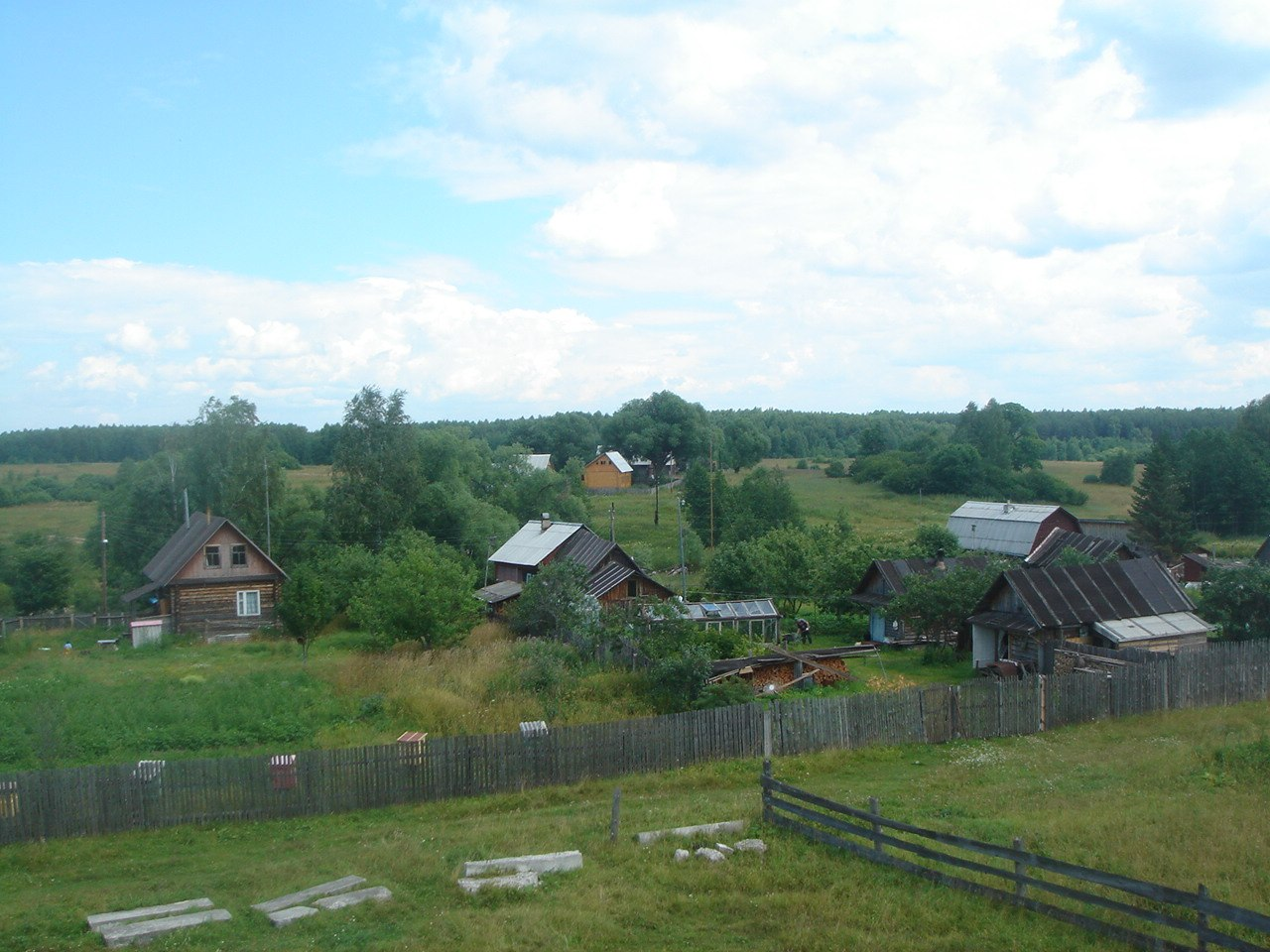
- Photo of Radovnie village, Yuryev-Polsky District

- Location within Vladimir Oblast Location within Russia
- Coordinates: 56°46′N 39°34′E
- Country: Russia
- Region: Vladimir Oblast
- District: Yuryev-Polsky District
- Time zone: UTC+3:00

Radovanye (Russian: Радованье) is a rural locality (a selo) in Simskoye Rural Settlement, Yuryev-Polsky District, Vladimir Oblast, Russia. The population was 5 as of 2010.

== Geography ==
Radovanye is located 38 km north of Yuryev-Polsky (the district's administrative centre) by road. Poluyevo is the nearest rural locality.
