= Gorki, Yuryev-Polsky District, Vladimir Oblast =

Gorki Горки
- Selo
- Location within Vladimir Oblast Location within Russia
- Coordinates: 56°34′N 39°23′E
- Country: Russia
- Region: Vladimir Oblast
- District: Yuryev-Polsky District
- Time zone: UTC+3:00

Gorki (Russian: Горки) is a rural locality (a selo) in Krasnoselskoye Rural Settlement, Yuryev-Polsky District, Vladimir Oblast, Russia. The population was 491 as of 2010. There are 9 streets.

== Geography ==
Gorki is located on the Kist River, 22 km northwest of Yuryev-Polsky (the district's administrative centre) by road. Vypolzovo is the nearest rural locality.
