= Kuzmadino =

Kuzmadino Кузьмадино
- Selo
- Location within Vladimir Oblast Location within Russia
- Coordinates: 56°28′N 39°41′E
- Country: Russia
- Region: Vladimir Oblast
- District: Yuryev-Polsky District
- Time zone: UTC+3:00

Kuzmadino (Russian: Кузьмадино) is a rural locality (a selo) in Krasnoselskoye Rural Settlement, Yuryev-Polsky District, Vladimir Oblast, Russia. The population was 301 as of 2010. There are 5 streets.

== Geography ==
Kuzmadino is located on the left bank of the Koloksha River, 3 km south of Yuryev-Polsky (the district's administrative centre) by road. Yuryev-Polsky is the nearest rural locality.
