= Shipilovo, Yuryev-Polsky District, Vladimir Oblast =

Shipilovo Шипилово
- Selo
- Location within Vladimir Oblast Location within Russia
- Coordinates: 56°31′N 39°54′E
- Country: Russia
- Region: Vladimir Oblast
- District: Yuryev-Polsky District
- Time zone: UTC+3:00

Shipilovo (Russian: Шипилово) is a rural locality (a selo) in Krasnoselskoye Rural Settlement, Yuryev-Polsky District, Vladimir Oblast, Russia. The population was 368 as of 2010.

== Geography ==
Shipilovo is located 18 km east of Yuryev-Polsky (the district's administrative centre) by road. Maloluchinskoye is the nearest rural locality.
