= Tartyshevo =

Tartyshevo Тартышево
- Village
- Location within Vladimir Oblast Location within Russia
- Coordinates: 56°21′N 40°05′E
- Country: Russia
- Region: Vladimir Oblast
- District: Yuryev-Polsky District
- Time zone: UTC+3:00

Tartyshevo (Russian: Тартышево) is a rural locality (a village) in Nebylovskoye Rural Settlement, Yuryev-Polsky District, Vladimir Oblast, Russia. The population was 3 as of 2010.

== Geography ==
Tartyshevo is located 32 km southeast from Yuryev-Polsky (the district's administrative centre) by road. Mukino is the nearest rural locality.
