= Krasnoye Zarechye =

Krasnoye Zarechye Красное Заречье
- Selo
- Location within Vladimir Oblast Location within Russia
- Coordinates: 56°19′N 39°52′E
- Country: Russia
- Region: Vladimir Oblast
- District: Yuryev-Polsky District
- Time zone: UTC+3:00

Krasnoye Zarechye (Russian: Красное Заречье) is a rural locality (a selo) in Nebylovskoye Rural Settlement, Yuryev-Polsky District, Vladimir Oblast, Russia. The population was 324 as of 2010.

== Geography ==
Krasnoye Zarechye is located on the Koloksha River, 33 km southeast of Yuryev-Polsky (the district's administrative centre) by road. Prechistaya Gora is the nearest rural locality.
