= Chekovo =

Chekovo Чеково
- Selo
- Location within Vladimir Oblast Location within Russia
- Coordinates: 56°17′N 39°57′E
- Country: Russia
- Region: Vladimir Oblast
- District: Yuryev-Polsky District
- Time zone: UTC+3:00

Chekovo (Russian: Чеково) is a rural locality (a selo) in Nebylovskoye Rural Settlement, Yuryev-Polsky District, Vladimir Oblast, Russia. The population was 442 as of 2010. There are 12 streets.

== Geography ==
Chekovo is located 38 km southeast of Yuryev-Polsky (the district's administrative centre) by road. Zhelezovo is the nearest rural locality.
