= Goryainovo =

Goryainovo Горяиново
- Selo
- Location within Vladimir Oblast Location within Russia
- Coordinates: 56°25′N 39°58′E
- Country: Russia
- Region: Vladimir Oblast
- District: Yuryev-Polsky District
- Time zone: UTC+3:00

Goryainovo (Russian: Горяиново) is a rural locality (a selo) in Nebylovskoye Rural Settlement, Yuryev-Polsky District, Vladimir Oblast, Russia. The population was 73 as of 2010.

== Geography ==
Goryainovo is located 27 km southeast of Yuryev-Polsky (the district's administrative centre) by road. Zventsovo is the nearest rural locality.
