= Maymor =

Maymor Маймор
- Selo
- Location within Vladimir Oblast Location within Russia
- Coordinates: 56°40′N 39°20′E
- Country: Russia
- Region: Vladimir Oblast
- District: Yuryev-Polsky District
- Time zone: UTC+3:00

Maymor (Russian: Маймор) is a rural locality (a selo) in Simskoye Rural Settlement, Yuryev-Polsky District, Vladimir Oblast, Russia. The population was 3 as of 2010.

== Geography ==
Maymor is located 55 km northwest of Yuryev-Polsky (the district's administrative centre) by road. Slavitino is the nearest rural locality.
