= Zaborye, Vladimir Oblast =

Zaborye Заборье
- Selo
- Location within Vladimir Oblast Location within Russia
- Coordinates: 56°43′N 39°39′E
- Country: Russia
- Region: Vladimir Oblast
- District: Yuryev-Polsky District
- Time zone: UTC+3:00

Zaborye (Russian: Заборье) is a rural locality (a selo) in Simskoye Rural Settlement, Yuryev-Polsky District, Vladimir Oblast, Russia. The population was 3 as of 2010.

== Geography ==
Zaborye is located on the Seleksha River, 29 km north of Yuryev-Polsky (the district's administrative centre) by road. Podlesny is the nearest rural locality.
