= Dubrava, Vladimir Oblast =

Dubrava Дубрава
- Selo
- Location within Vladimir Oblast Location within Russia
- Coordinates: 56°45′N 39°35′E
- Country: Russia
- Region: Vladimir Oblast
- District: Yuryev-Polsky District
- Time zone: UTC+3:00

Dubrava (Russian: Дубрава) is a rural locality (a selo) in Simskoye Rural Settlement, Yuryev-Polsky District, Vladimir Oblast, Russia. The population was 10 as of 2010.

== Geography ==
Dubrava is located 8 km north from Sima, 30 km north of Yuryev-Polsky (the district's administrative centre) by road. Teslovo is the nearest rural locality.
