= Belyanitsyno =

Belyanitsyno Беляницыно
- Selo
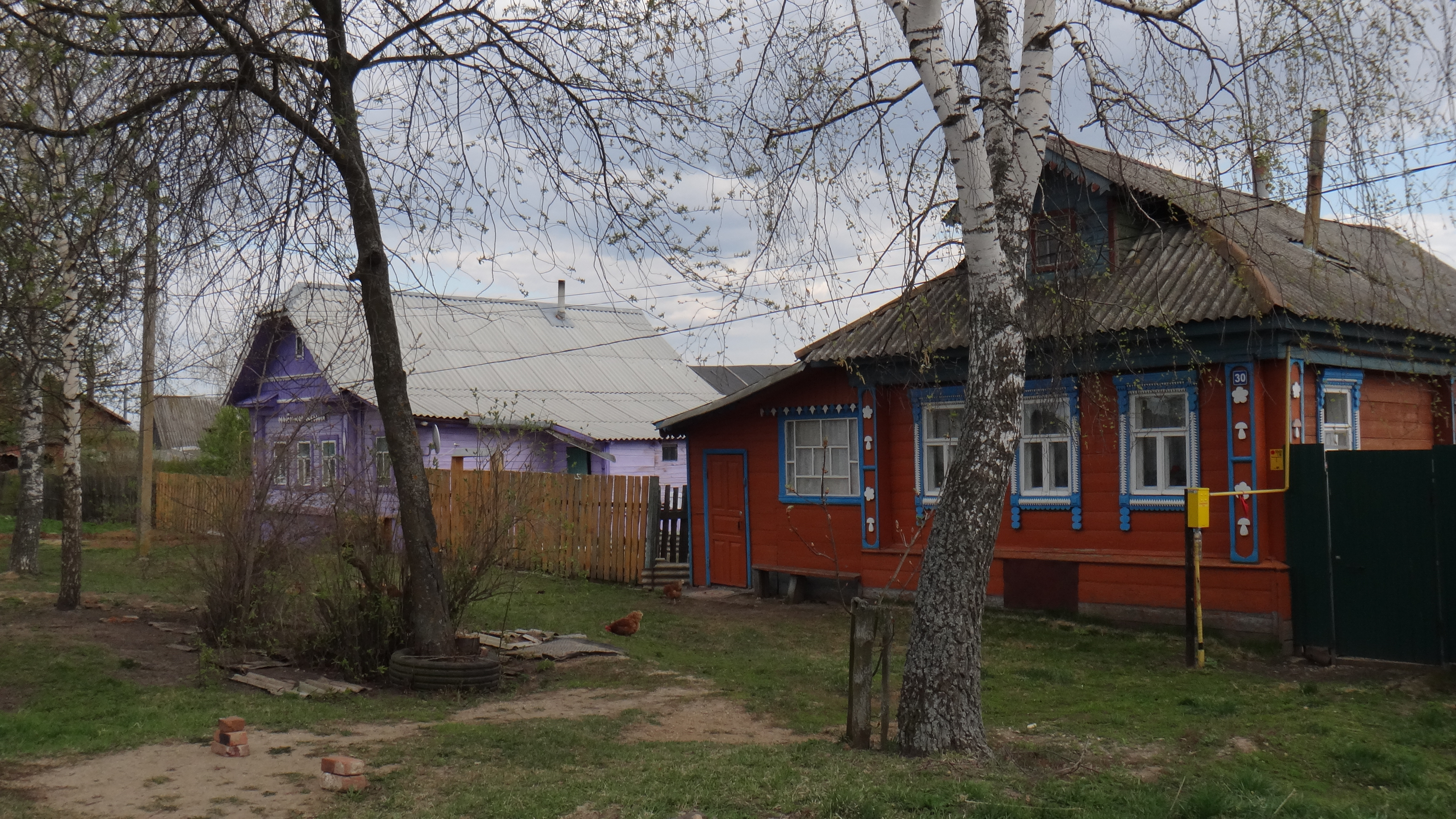
- Belyanitsino, Vladimirskaya oblast

- Location within Vladimir Oblast Location within Russia
- Coordinates: 56°37′N 39°49′E
- Country: Russia
- Region: Vladimir Oblast
- District: Yuryev-Polsky District
- Time zone: UTC+3:00

Belyanitsyno (Russian: Беляницыно) is a rural locality (a selo) in Krasnoselskoye Rural Settlement, Yuryev-Polsky District, Vladimir Oblast, Russia. The population was 277 as of 2010. There are 3 streets.

== Geography ==
Belyanitsyno is located 21 km northeast of Yuryev-Polsky (the district's administrative centre) by road. Grigorovo is the nearest rural locality.
