= Palazino =

Palazino Палазино
- Selo
- Location within Vladimir Oblast Location within Russia
- Coordinates: 56°27′N 39°37′E
- Country: Russia
- Region: Vladimir Oblast
- District: Yuryev-Polsky District
- Time zone: UTC+3:00

Palazino (Russian: Палазино) is a rural locality (a selo) in Krasnoselskoye Rural Settlement, Yuryev-Polsky District, Vladimir Oblast, Russia. The population was 7 as of 2010.

== Geography ==
Palazino is located on the Sega River, 6 km southwest of Yuryev-Polsky (the district's administrative centre) by road. Drozdovo is the nearest rural locality.
