= Dergayevo =

Dergayevo (Russian: Дергаево) is the name of several rural localities in Russia:

- Dergayevo, Pavlovo-Posadsky District, Moscow Oblast, a village in Averkiyevskoye Rural Settlement of Pavlovo-Posadsky District in Moscow Oblast
- Dergayevo, Ramensky District, Moscow Oblast, a village under the administrative jurisdiction of the Town of Ramenskoye in Ramensky District of Moscow Oblast
- Dergayevo, Vladimir Oblast, a village in Yuryev-Polsky District of Vladimir Oblast
- Dergayevo, Ferapontovsky Selsoviet, Kirillovsky District, Vologda Oblast, a village in Ferapontovsky Selsoviet of Kirillovsky District in Vologda Oblast
- Dergayevo, Kolkachsky Selsoviet, Kirillovsky District, Vologda Oblast, a village in Kolkachsky Selsoviet of Kirillovsky District in Vologda Oblast
