= Khoroshovka, Vladimir Oblast =

Khoroshovka Хорошовка
- Village
- Location within Vladimir Oblast Location within Russia
- Coordinates: 56°40′N 39°51′E
- Country: Russia
- Region: Vladimir Oblast
- District: Yuryev-Polsky District
- Time zone: UTC+3:00

Khoroshovka (Russian: Хорошовка) is a rural locality (a village) in Krasnoselskoye Rural Settlement, Yuryev-Polsky District, Vladimir Oblast, Russia. The population was 9 as of 2010.

== Geography ==
Khoroshovka is located 27 km northeast of Yuryev-Polsky (the district's administrative centre) by road. Svaino is the nearest rural locality.
