= Matveyshchevo =

Matveyshchevo Матвейщево
- Selo
- Location within Vladimir Oblast Location within Russia
- Coordinates: 56°39′N 39°28′E
- Country: Russia
- Region: Vladimir Oblast
- District: Yuryev-Polsky District
- Time zone: UTC+3:00

Matveyshchevo (Russian: Матвейщево) is a rural locality (a selo) in Simskoye Rural Settlement, Yuryev-Polsky District, Vladimir Oblast, Russia. The population was 349 as of 2010. There are 6 streets.

== Geography ==
Matveyshchevo is located 30 km northwest of Yuryev-Polsky (the district's administrative centre) by road. Spasskoye is the nearest rural locality.
