= Gavriltsevo =

Gavriltsevo Гаврильцево
- Village
- Location within Vladimir Oblast Location within Russia
- Coordinates: 56°22′N 39°39′E
- Country: Russia
- Region: Vladimir Oblast
- District: Yuryev-Polsky District
- Time zone: UTC+3:00

Gavriltsevo (Russian: Гаврильцево) is a rural locality (a village) in Krasnoselskoye Rural Settlement, Yuryev-Polsky District, Vladimir Oblast, Russia. The population was 1 as of 2010.

== Geography ==
Gavriltsevo is located on the Voshenka River, 17 km south of Yuryev-Polsky (the district's administrative centre) by road. Ternovka is the nearest rural locality.
