= Karandyshevo =

Karandyshevo Карандышево
- Village
- Location within Vladimir Oblast Location within Russia
- Coordinates: 56°17′N 39°48′E
- Country: Russia
- Region: Vladimir Oblast
- District: Yuryev-Polsky District
- Time zone: UTC+3:00

Karandyshevo (Russian: Карандышево) is a rural locality (a village) in Krasnoselskoye Rural Settlement, Yuryev-Polsky District, Vladimir Oblast, Russia. The population was 42 as of 2010. There are 7 streets.

== Geography ==
Karandyshevo is located 27 km southeast of Yuryev-Polsky (the district's administrative centre) by road. Avdotyino is the nearest rural locality.
