= Fedosyino =

Fedosyino Федосьино
- Selo
- Location within Vladimir Oblast Location within Russia
- Coordinates: 56°33′N 39°39′E
- Country: Russia
- Region: Vladimir Oblast
- District: Yuryev-Polsky District
- Time zone: UTC+3:00

Fedosyino (Russian: Федосьино) is a rural locality (a selo) in Krasnoselskoye Rural Settlement, Yuryev-Polsky District, Vladimir Oblast, Russia. The population was 47 as of 2010.

== Geography ==
Fedosyino is located 7 km north of Yuryev-Polsky (the district's administrative centre) by road. Opolye is the nearest rural locality.
