= Soroguzhino =

Soroguzhino Сорогужино
- Selo
- Location within Vladimir Oblast Location within Russia
- Coordinates: 56°35′N 39°37′E
- Country: Russia
- Region: Vladimir Oblast
- District: Yuryev-Polsky District
- Time zone: UTC+3:00

Soroguzhino (Russian: Сорогужино) is a rural locality (a selo) in Krasnoselskoye Rural Settlement, Yuryev-Polsky District, Vladimir Oblast, Russia. The population was 241 as of 2010.

== Geography ==
Soroguzhino is located 11 km north of Yuryev-Polsky (the district's administrative centre) by road. Volstvinovo is the nearest rural locality.
