= Kubayevo =

Kubayevo Кубаево
- Selo
- Location within Vladimir Oblast Location within Russia
- Coordinates: 56°32′N 39°48′E
- Country: Russia
- Region: Vladimir Oblast
- District: Yuryev-Polsky District
- Time zone: UTC+3:00

Kubayevo (Russian: Кубаево) is a rural locality (a selo) in Krasnoselskoye Rural Settlement, Yuryev-Polsky District, Vladimir Oblast, Russia. The population was 46 as of 2010.

== Geography ==
Kubayevo is located 20 km northeast of Yuryev-Polsky (the district's administrative centre) by road. Maloluchinskoye is the nearest rural locality.
