= Listvenny =

Listvenny Лиственный
- Selo
- Location within Vladimir Oblast Location within Russia
- Coordinates: 56°24′N 39°42′E
- Country: Russia
- Region: Vladimir Oblast
- District: Yuryev-Polsky District
- Time zone: UTC+3:00

Listvenny (Russian: Лиственный) is a rural locality (a selo) in Krasnoselskoye Rural Settlement, Yuryev-Polsky District, Vladimir Oblast, Russia. The population was 21 as of 2010.

== Geography ==
Listvenny is located 13 km south of Yuryev-Polsky (the district's administrative centre) by road. Shadrino is the nearest rural locality.
