= Bogdanovskoye, Vladimir Oblast =

Bogdanovskoye Богдановское
- Selo
- Location within Vladimir Oblast Location within Russia
- Coordinates: 56°27′N 40°02′E
- Country: Russia
- Region: Vladimir Oblast
- District: Yuryev-Polsky District
- Time zone: UTC+3:00

Bogdanovskoye (Russian: Богдановское) is a rural locality (a selo) in Nebylovskoye Rural Settlement, Yuryev-Polsky District, Vladimir Oblast, Russia. The population was 62 as of 2010.

== Geography ==
Bogdanovskoye is located 41 km east of Yuryev-Polsky (the district's administrative centre) by road. Dergayevo is the nearest rural locality.
