= Simizino =

Simizino Симизино
- Selo
- Location within Vladimir Oblast Location within Russia
- Coordinates: 56°21′N 39°51′E
- Country: Russia
- Region: Vladimir Oblast
- District: Yuryev-Polsky District
- Time zone: UTC+3:00

Simizino (Russian: Симизино) is a rural locality (a selo) in Nebylovskoye Rural Settlement, Yuryev-Polsky District, Vladimir Oblast, Russia. The population was 7 as of 2010.

== Geography ==
Simizino is located 30 km southeast of Yuryev-Polsky (the district's administrative centre) by road. Sluda is the nearest rural locality.
