= Varvarino, Yuryev-Polsky District, Vladimir Oblast =

Varvarino Варварино
- Selo
- Location within Vladimir Oblast Location within Russia
- Coordinates: 56°26′N 39°44′E
- Country: Russia
- Region: Vladimir Oblast
- District: Yuryev-Polsky District
- Time zone: UTC+3:00

Varvarino (Russian: Варварино) is a rural locality (a selo) in Krasnoselskoye Rural Settlement, Yuryev-Polsky District, Vladimir Oblast, Russia. The population was 22 as of 2010.

== Geography ==
Varvarino is located on the left bank of the Koloksha River, 10 km southeast of Yuryev-Polsky (the district's administrative centre) by road. Yeltsy is the nearest rural locality.
