= Knyazhikha =

Knyazhikha Княжиха
- Village
- Location within Vladimir Oblast Location within Russia
- Coordinates: 56°40′N 39°45′E
- Country: Russia
- Region: Vladimir Oblast
- District: Yuryev-Polsky District
- Time zone: UTC+3:00

Knyazhikha (Russian: Княжиха) is a rural locality (a village) in Krasnoselskoye Rural Settlement, Yuryev-Polsky District, Vladimir Oblast, Russia. The population was 7 as of 2010.

== Geography ==
Knyazhikha is located on the Pikliya River, 32 km northeast of Yuryev-Polsky (the district's administrative centre) by road. Ivorovo is the nearest rural locality.
