= Kolenovo =

Village in Vladimir Oblast, Russia

Kolenovo Коленово
- Village
- Location within Vladimir Oblast Location within Russia
- Coordinates: 56°42′N 39°33′E
- Country: Russia
- Region: Vladimir Oblast
- District: Yuryev-Polsky District
- Time zone: UTC+3:00

Kolenovo (Russian: Коленово) is a rural locality (a village) in Simskoye Rural Settlement, Yuryev-Polsky District, Vladimir Oblast, Russia. The population was 26 as of 2010.

== Geography ==
Kolenovo is located on the Seleksha River, 27 km north of Yuryev-Polsky (the district's administrative centre) by road. Sima is the nearest rural locality.
