= Vyoska =

Vyoska Вёска
- Village
- Location within Vladimir Oblast Location within Russia
- Coordinates: 56°37′N 39°39′E
- Country: Russia
- Region: Vladimir Oblast
- District: Yuryev-Polsky District
- Time zone: UTC+3:00

Vyoska (Russian: Вёска) is a rural locality (a village) in Simskoye Rural Settlement, Yuryev-Polsky District, Vladimir Oblast, Russia. The population was 188 as of 2010.

== Geography ==
Vyoska is located 18 km north of Yuryev-Polsky (the district's administrative centre) by road. Aleksino is the nearest rural locality.
