= Kolokoltsevo, Vladimir Oblast =

Kolokoltsevo Колокольцево
- Village
- Location within Vladimir Oblast Location within Russia
- Coordinates: 56°27′N 39°41′E
- Country: Russia
- Region: Vladimir Oblast
- District: Yuryev-Polsky District
- Time zone: UTC+3:00

Kolokoltsevo (Russian: Колокольцево) is a rural locality (a village) in Krasnoselskoye Rural Settlement, Yuryev-Polsky District, Vladimir Oblast, Russia. The population was 6 as of 2010.

== Geography ==
Kolokoltsevo is located on the Koloksha River, 7 km south of Yuryev-Polsky (the district's administrative centre) by road. Sosnovy Bor is the nearest rural locality.
