= Yelokh =

Yelokh Елох
- Village
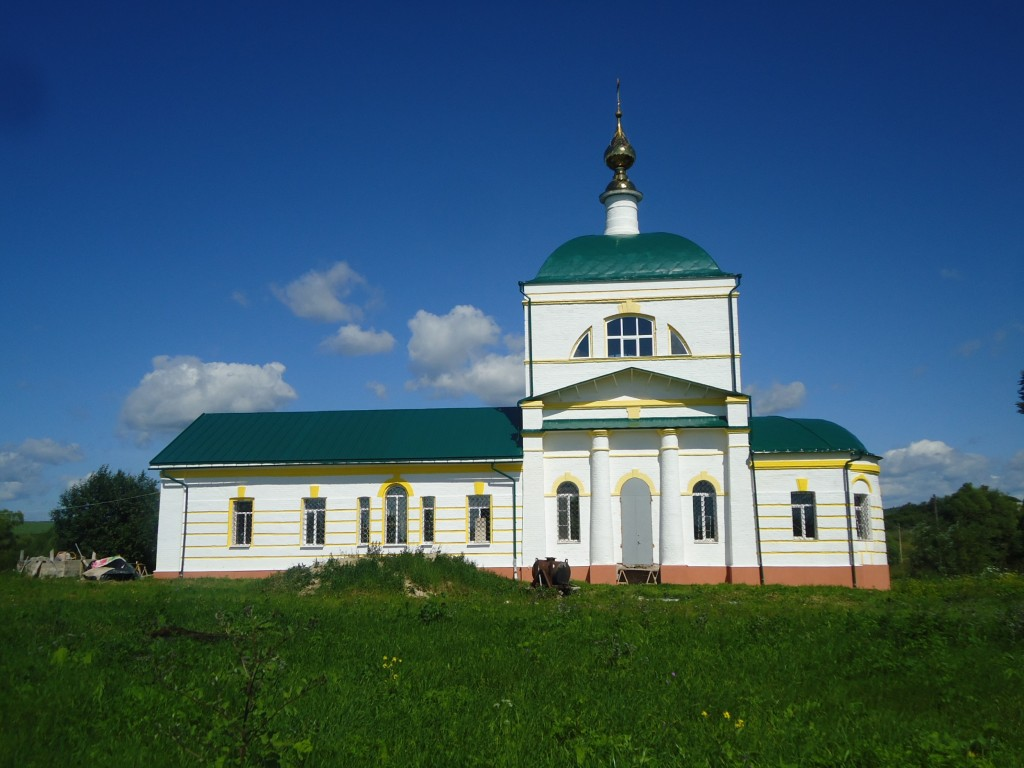
- Church of John the Theologian in Yelokh, Russia.

- Location within Vladimir Oblast Location within Russia
- Coordinates: 56°31′N 39°30′E
- Country: Russia
- Region: Vladimir Oblast
- District: Yuryev-Polsky District
- Time zone: UTC+3:00

Yelokh (Russian: Елох) is a rural locality (a village) in Krasnoselskoye Rural Settlement, Yuryev-Polsky District, Vladimir Oblast, Russia. The population was 15 as of 2010.

== Geography ==
Yelokh is located on the Koloksha River, 14 km west of Yuryev-Polsky (the district's administrative centre) by road. Frolovskoye is the nearest rural locality.
