= Kokorekino =

Kokorekino Кокорекино
- Village
- Location within Vladimir Oblast Location within Russia
- Coordinates: 56°38′N 39°20′E
- Country: Russia
- Region: Vladimir Oblast
- District: Yuryev-Polsky District
- Time zone: UTC+3:00

Kokorekino (Russian: Кокорекино) is a rural locality (a village) in Simskoye Rural Settlement, Yuryev-Polsky District, Vladimir Oblast, Russia. The population was 1 as of 2010.

== Geography ==
Kokorekino is located on the Kist River, 58 km northwest of Yuryev-Polsky (the district's administrative centre) by road. Kamenka is the nearest rural locality.
