= Cherkasovo, Yuryev-Polsky District, Vladimir Oblast =

Cherkasovo Черкасово
- Selo
- Location within Vladimir Oblast Location within Russia
- Coordinates: 56°37′N 39°23′E
- Country: Russia
- Region: Vladimir Oblast
- District: Yuryev-Polsky District
- Time zone: UTC+3:00

Cherkasovo (Russian: Черкасово) is a rural locality (a selo) in Krasnoselskoye Rural Settlement, Yuryev-Polsky District, Vladimir Oblast, Russia. The population was 29 as of 2010.

== Geography ==
Cherkasovo is located 29 kilometres (18 mi) northwest of Yuryev-Polsky (the district's administrative centre) by road. Ryabinino is the nearest rural locality.
