= Karabanikha =

Karabanikha Карабаниха
- Village
- Location within Vladimir Oblast Location within Russia
- Coordinates: 56°33′N 39°25′E
- Country: Russia
- Region: Vladimir Oblast
- District: Yuryev-Polsky District
- Time zone: UTC+3:00

Karabanikha (Russian: Карабаниха) is a rural locality (a small village) in Krasnoselskoye Rural Settlement, Yuryev-Polsky District, Vladimir Oblast, Russia. The population was 3 as of 2010.

== Geography ==
Karabanikha is located 19 km northwest of Yuryev-Polsky (the district's administrative centre) by road. Makhlino is the nearest rural locality.
