= Shegodskaya =

Shegodskaya Шегодская
- Village
- Location within Vladimir Oblast Location within Russia
- Coordinates: 56°39′N 39°37′E
- Country: Russia
- Region: Vladimir Oblast
- District: Yuryev-Polsky District
- Time zone: UTC+3:00

Shegodskaya (Russian: Шегодская) is a rural locality (a village) in Simskoye Rural Settlement, Yuryev-Polsky District, Vladimir Oblast, Russia. The population was three people as of 2010.

== Geography ==
Shegodskaya is located on the Seleksha River, 19 km north of Yuryev-Polsky (the district's administrative centre) by road. Shegodskoye is the nearest rural locality.
