= Zventsovo =

Zventsovo Звенцово
- Village
- Location within Vladimir Oblast Location within Russia
- Coordinates: 56°24′N 39°59′E
- Country: Russia
- Region: Vladimir Oblast
- District: Yuryev-Polsky District
- Time zone: UTC+3:00

Zventsovo (Russian: Звенцово) is a rural locality (a village) in Nebylovskoye Rural Settlement, Yuryev-Polsky District, Vladimir Oblast, Russia. The population was 141 as of 2010.

== Geography ==
Zventsovo is located 25 km southeast of Yuryev-Polsky (the district's administrative centre) by road. Goryainovo is the nearest rural locality.
