= Bogorodskoye, Yuryev-Polsky District, Vladimir Oblast =

Bogorodskoye Богородское
- Selo
- Location within Vladimir Oblast Location within Russia
- Coordinates: 56°28′N 39°54′E
- Country: Russia
- Region: Vladimir Oblast
- District: Yuryev-Polsky District
- Time zone: UTC+3:00

Bogorodskoye (Russian: Богородское) is a rural locality (a selo) in Nebylovskoye Rural Settlement, Yuryev-Polsky District, Vladimir Oblast, Russia. The population was 2 as of 2010.

== Geography ==
Bogorodskoye is located 15 km east of Yuryev-Polsky (the district's administrative centre) by road. Krasnaya Gorka is the nearest rural locality.
