= Zhelezovo =

Zhelezovo Железово
- Village
- Location within Vladimir Oblast Location within Russia
- Coordinates: 56°18′N 39°58′E
- Country: Russia
- Region: Vladimir Oblast
- District: Yuryev-Polsky District
- Time zone: UTC+3:00

Zhelezovo (Russian: Железово) is a rural locality (a village) in Nebylovskoye Rural Settlement, Yuryev-Polsky District, Vladimir Oblast, Russia. The population was 20 as of 2010. There are 3 streets.

== Geography ==
Zhelezovo is located 37 km southeast of Yuryev-Polsky (the district's administrative centre) by road. Chekovo is the nearest rural locality.
