= Kotluchino =

Kotluchino Котлучино
- Selo
- Location within Vladimir Oblast Location within Russia
- Coordinates: 56°18′N 40°00′E
- Country: Russia
- Region: Vladimir Oblast
- District: Yuryev-Polsky District
- Time zone: UTC+3:00

Kotluchino (Russian: Котлучино) is a rural locality (a selo) in Nebylovskoye Rural Settlement, Yuryev-Polsky District, Vladimir Oblast, Russia. The population was 20 as of 2010. There are 3 streets.

== Geography ==
Kotluchino is located on the Kuftiga River, 35 km southeast of Yuryev-Polsky (the district's administrative centre) by road. Zhelezovo is the nearest rural locality.
