= Alexino, Yuryev-Polsky District, Vladimir Oblast =

Alexino Алексино
- Selo
- Location within Vladimir Oblast Location within Russia
- Coordinates: 56°38′N 39°41′E
- Country: Russia
- Region: Vladimir Oblast
- District: Yuryev-Polsky District
- Time zone: UTC+3:00

Alexino (Russian: Алексино) is a rural locality (a selo) in Simskoye Rural Settlement, Yuryev-Polsky District, Vladimir Oblast, Russia. The population was 6 as of 2010.

== Geography ==
Alexino is located 22 km (14 mi) north of Yuryev-Polsky (the district's administrative centre) by road. Vyoska is the nearest rural locality.
