= Fyodorovsky =

Fyodorovsky (masculine), Fyodorovskaya (feminine), or Fyodorovskoye (neuter), may refer to:

- Fyodor Fedorovsky (1883-1955), Soviet stage designer
- Fyodorovsky District, name of several districts in Russia
- Fyodorovsky (inhabited locality) (Fyodorovskaya, Fyodorovskoye), name of several inhabited localities in Russia
