= Dergayevo, Vladimir Oblast =

Dergayevo Дергаево
- Village
- Location within Vladimir Oblast Location within Russia
- Coordinates: 56°26′N 40°02′E
- Country: Russia
- Region: Vladimir Oblast
- District: Yuryev-Polsky District
- Time zone: UTC+3:00

Dergayevo (Russian: Дергаево) is a rural locality (a village) in Nebylovskoye Rural Settlement, Yuryev-Polsky District, Vladimir Oblast, Russia. The population was 8 as of 2010.

== Geography ==
Dergayevo is located 42 km southeast of Yuryev-Polsky (the district's administrative centre) by road. Bogdanovskoye is the nearest rural locality.
