= Fyodorovskoye (Simskoye Rural Settlement), Yuryev-Polsky District, Vladimir Oblast =

Fyodorovskoye Фёдоровское
- Selo
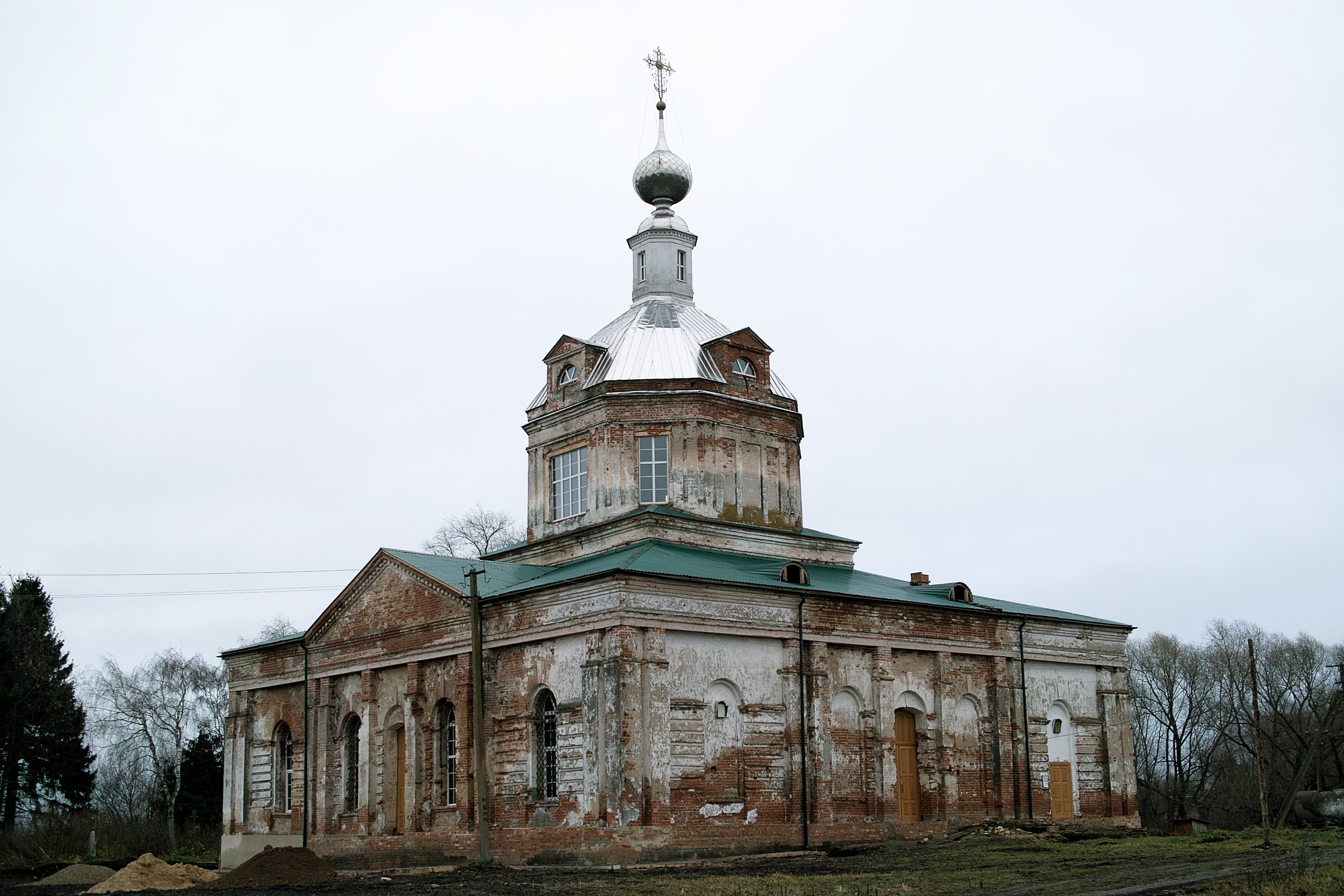
- Church in Fyodorovskoye

- Location within Vladimir Oblast Location within Russia
- Coordinates: 56°38′N 39°35′E
- Country: Russia
- Region: Vladimir Oblast
- District: Yuryev-Polsky District
- Time zone: UTC+3:00

Fyodorovskoye (Russian: Фёдоровское) is a rural locality (a selo) in Simskoye Rural Settlement, Yuryev-Polsky District, Vladimir Oblast, Russia. The population was 151 as of 2010.

== Geography ==
It is located on the Seleksha River, 5 km south from Sima, 16 km north from Yuryev-Polsky.
