= Podolets, Vladimir Oblast =

Podolets Подолец
- Selo
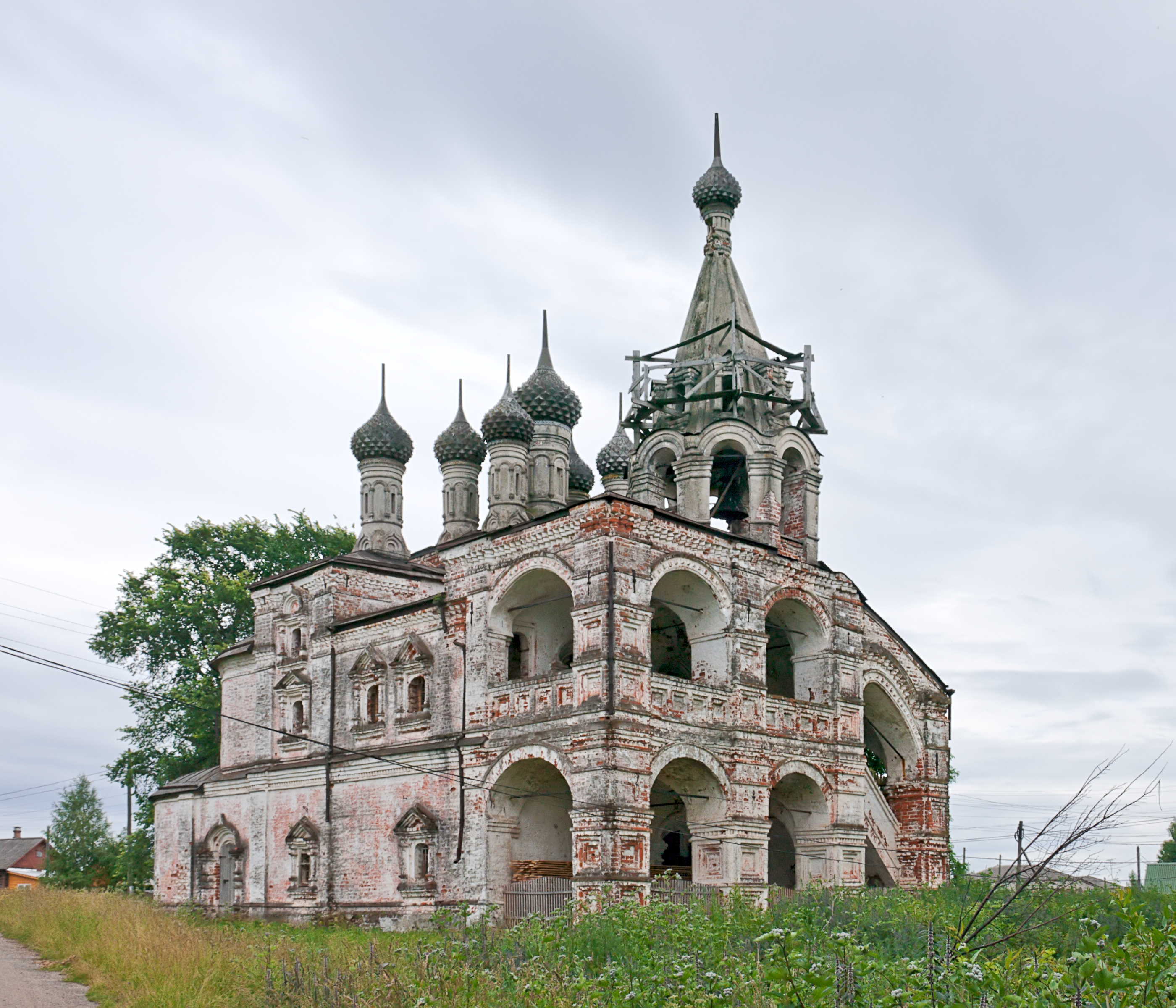
- The Trinity Church in the village of Podolets

- Location within Vladimir Oblast Location within Russia
- Coordinates: 56°41′N 39°48′E
- Country: Russia
- Region: Vladimir Oblast
- District: Yuryev-Polsky District

Area
  - Total: 0.99 km^{2} (0.38 sq mi)
- Highest elevation: 142 m (466 ft)
- Lowest elevation: 134 m (440 ft)
- Time zone: UTC+3:00

Podolets (Russian: Подолец) is a rural locality (a selo) in Krasnoselskoye Rural Settlement, Yuryev-Polsky District, Vladimir Oblast, Russia. The population was 291 as of 2010. There are 3 streets.

== Geography ==
Podolets is located 28 km northeast of Yuryev-Polsky (the district's administrative centre) by road. Svaino is the nearest rural locality.
