= Fyodorovsky District =

Location of the Republic of Bashkortostan in Russia

Location of Saratov Oblast in Russia

Fyodorovsky District is the name of several administrative and municipal districts in Russia:

- Fyodorovsky District, Republic of Bashkortostan, an administrative and municipal district of the Republic of Bashkortostan
- Fyodorovsky District, Saratov Oblast, an administrative and municipal district of Saratov Oblast

== See also ==
- Fyodorovsky (disambiguation)
