= Fyodorovskoye, Alexandrovsky District, Vladimir Oblast =

Fyodorovskoye Федоровское
- Village
- Location within Vladimir Oblast Location within Russia
- Coordinates: 56°20′N 38°52′E
- Country: Russia
- Region: Vladimir Oblast
- District: Alexandrovsky District
- Time zone: UTC+3:00

Fyodorovskoye (Russian: Федоровское) is a rural locality (a village) in Karinskoye Rural Settlement, Alexandrovsky District, Vladimir Oblast, Russia. The population was 10 as of 2010. There are 2 streets.

== Geography ==
Fyodorovskoye is located on the Maly Kirzhach River, 12 km southeast of Alexandrov (the district's administrative centre) by road. Belteyevka is the nearest rural locality.
