= Alexino, Petushinsky District, Vladimir Oblast =

Alexino Алексино
- Village
- Location within Vladimir Oblast Location within Russia
- Coordinates: 56°07′N 39°39′E
- Country: Russia
- Region: Vladimir Oblast
- District: Petushinsky District
- Time zone: UTC+3:00

Alexino (Russian: Алексино) is a rural locality (a village) in Pekshinskoye Rural Settlement, Petushinsky District, Vladimir Oblast, Russia. The population was 1 as of 2010.

== Geography ==
Alexino is located 44 km northeast of Petushki (the district's administrative centre) by road. Vasilki is the nearest rural locality.
