= Alexino, Staroselskoye Rural Settlement, Vologodsky District, Vologda Oblast =

Alexeyevo Алексино
- Village
- Location within Vologda Oblast Location within Russia
- Coordinates: 59°15′N 39°12′E
- Country: Russia
- Region: Vologda Oblast
- District: Vologodsky District
- Time zone: UTC+3:00

Alexeyevo (Russian: Алексино) is a rural locality (a village) in Staroselskoye Rural Settlement, Vologodsky District, Vologda Oblast, Russia. The population was 2 as of 2002.

== Geography ==
The distance to Vologda is 61 km, to Striznevo is 9 km. Talitsy, Rezvino, Gorka are the nearest rural localities.
