= Fyodorovskoye, Suzdalsky District, Vladimir Oblast =

Fyodorovskoye Фёдоровское
- Selo
- Location within Vladimir Oblast Location within Russia
- Coordinates: 56°19′N 40°21′E
- Country: Russia
- Region: Vladimir Oblast
- District: Suzdalsky District
- Time zone: UTC+3:00

Fyodorovskoye (Russian: Фёдоровское) is a rural locality (a selo) in Seletskoye Rural Settlement, Suzdalsky District, Vladimir Oblast, Russia. The population was 2 as of 2010.

== Geography ==
Fyodorovskoye is located 13 km southwest of Suzdal (the district's administrative centre) by road. Turtino is the nearest rural locality.
