= Fyodorovskoye, Kirzhachsky District, Vladimir Oblast =

Fyodorovskoye Фёдоровское
- Village
- Location within Vladimir Oblast Location within Russia
- Coordinates: 56°07′N 38°51′E
- Country: Russia
- Region: Vladimir Oblast
- District: Kirzhachsky District
- Time zone: UTC+3:00

Fyodorovskoye (Russian: Фёдоровское) is a rural locality (a village) in Pershinskoye Rural Settlement, Kirzhachsky District, Vladimir Oblast, Russia. The population was 875 as of 2010. There are 11 streets.

== Geography ==
Fyodorovskoye is located on the right bank of the Kirzhach River, 6 km south of Kirzhach (the district's administrative centre) by road. Kirzhach is the nearest rural locality.
