= Berezniki, Sobinsky District, Vladimir Oblast =

Berezniki Березники
- Selo
- Location within Vladimir Oblast Location within Russia
- Coordinates: 55°52′N 40°06′E
- Country: Russia
- Region: Vladimir Oblast
- District: Sobinsky District
- Time zone: UTC+3:00

Berezniki (Russian: Березники) is a rural locality (a selo) and the administrative center of Bereznikovskoye Rural Settlement, Sobinsky District, Vladimir Oblast, RSFSR. Russia. The population was 466 as of 2010. There are 21 streets.

== Geography ==
Berezniki is located 20 km south of Sobinka (the district's administrative centre) by road. Konnovo is the nearest rural locality. ICBM area.
