= Alexino, Semyonkovskoye Rural Settlement, Vologodsky District, Vologda Oblast =

Alexino Алексино
- Village
- Location within Vologda Oblast Location within Russia
- Coordinates: 59°16′N 39°52′E
- Country: Russia
- Region: Vologda Oblast
- District: Vologodsky District
- Time zone: UTC+3:00

Alexino (Russian: Алексино) is a rural locality (a village) in Semyonkovskoye Rural Settlement, Vologodsky District, Vologda Oblast, Russia. The population was 3 as of 2002.

== Geography ==
The distance to Vologda is 9 km, to Semyonkovo is 1 km. Pudega, Barachevo, Yarygino, Kozhevnikovo, Krasnovo, Tsypoglazovo are the nearest rural localities.
