= Fyodorovskaya, Ivanovo Oblast =

Fyodorovskaya Фёдоровская
- Village
- Location within Ivanovo Oblast Location within Russia
- Coordinates: 56°56′N 42°13′E
- Country: Russia
- Region: Ivanovo Oblast
- District: Lukhsky District
- Time zone: UTC+3:00

Fyodorovskaya (Russian: Фёдоровская) is a rural locality (a village) in Lukhsky District, Ivanovo Oblast, Russia. Population: 11 (2010 census);

== Geography ==
This rural locality is located 7 kilometres (4.3 mi) from Lukh (the district's administrative centre), 76 kilometres (47 mi) from Ivanovo (capital of Ivanovo Oblast) and 309 kilometres (192 mi) from Moscow. Novosyolki is the nearest rural locality.
