= Alexino, Novlenskoye Rural Settlement, Vologodsky District, Vologda Oblast =

Alexeyevo Алексеево
- Village
- Location within Vologda Oblast Location within Russia
- Coordinates: 59°40′N 39°15′E
- Country: Russia
- Region: Vologda Oblast
- District: Vologodsky District
- Time zone: UTC+3:00

Alexeyevo (Russian: Алексеево) is a rural locality (a village) in Novlenskoye Rural Settlement, Vologodsky District, Vologda Oblast, Russia. The population was three as of 2002.

== Geography ==
The distance to Vologda is 76 km, to Novlenskoye is 8 km. Oleshkovo, Avdeyevo, Kelebardovo, Zhukovo, Kobelevo, Sazonovo are the nearest rural localities.
