= Dobrynskoye, Vologda Oblast =

Dobrynskoye Добрынское
- Village
- Location within Vologda Oblast Location within Russia
- Coordinates: 58°51′N 38°14′E
- Country: Russia
- Region: Vologda Oblast
- District: Cherepovetsky District
- Time zone: UTC+3:00

Dobrynskoye (Russian: Добрынское) is a rural locality (a village) in Myaksinskoye Rural Settlement, Cherepovetsky District, Vologda Oblast, Russia. The population was 22 as of 2002.

== Geography ==
Dobrynskoye is located 38 km (24 mi) southeast of Cherepovets (the district's administrative centre) by road. Lukinskoye is the nearest rural locality.
