= Podolets, Sheksninsky District, Vologda Oblast =

Podolets Подолец
- Village
- Location within Vologda Oblast Location within Russia
- Coordinates: 59°09′N 38°37′E
- Country: Russia
- Region: Vologda Oblast
- District: Sheksninsky District
- Time zone: UTC+3:00

Podolets (Russian: Подолец) is a rural locality (a village) in Ugolskoye Rural Settlement, Sheksninsky District, Vologda Oblast, Russia. The population was 17 as of 2002.

== Geography ==
Podolets is located 11 km southeast of Sheksna (the district's administrative centre) by road. Rylovo is the nearest rural locality.
