= Fyodorovsky, Voronezh Oblast =

Fyodorovsky Фёдоровский
- Khutor
- Location within Voronezh Oblast Location within Russia
- Coordinates: 51°07′N 39°46′E
- Country: Russia
- Region: Voronezh Oblast
- District: Liskinsky District
- Time zone: UTC+3:00

Fyodorovsky (Russian: Фёдоровский) is a rural locality (a khutor) in Sredneikoretskoye Rural Settlement, Liskinsky District, Voronezh Oblast, Russia. The population was 79 as of 2010. There are 2 streets.

== Geography ==
Fyodorovsky is located 34 km northeast of Liski (the district's administrative centre) by road. Neskuchny is the nearest rural locality.
