= Dobrynskoye, Suzdalsky District, Vladimir Oblast =

Dobrynskoye Добрынское
- Selo
- Location within Vladimir Oblast Location within Russia
- Coordinates: 56°14′N 40°33′E
- Country: Russia
- Region: Vladimir Oblast
- District: Suzdalsky District
- Time zone: UTC+3:00

Dobrynskoye (Russian: Добрынское) is a rural locality (a selo) in Bogolyubovskoye Rural Settlement, Suzdalsky District, Vladimir Oblast, Russia. The population was 752 as of 2010. There are 11 streets.

== Geography ==
Dobrynskoye is located on the Nerl River, 40 km southeast of Suzdal (the district's administrative centre) by road. Sokol is the nearest rural locality.
