= Nebyloye =

Nebyloye Небылое
- Selo
- Location within Vladimir Oblast Location within Russia
- Coordinates: 56°21′N 39°59′E
- Country: Russia
- Region: Vladimir Oblast
- District: Yuryev-Polsky District
- Time zone: UTC+3:00

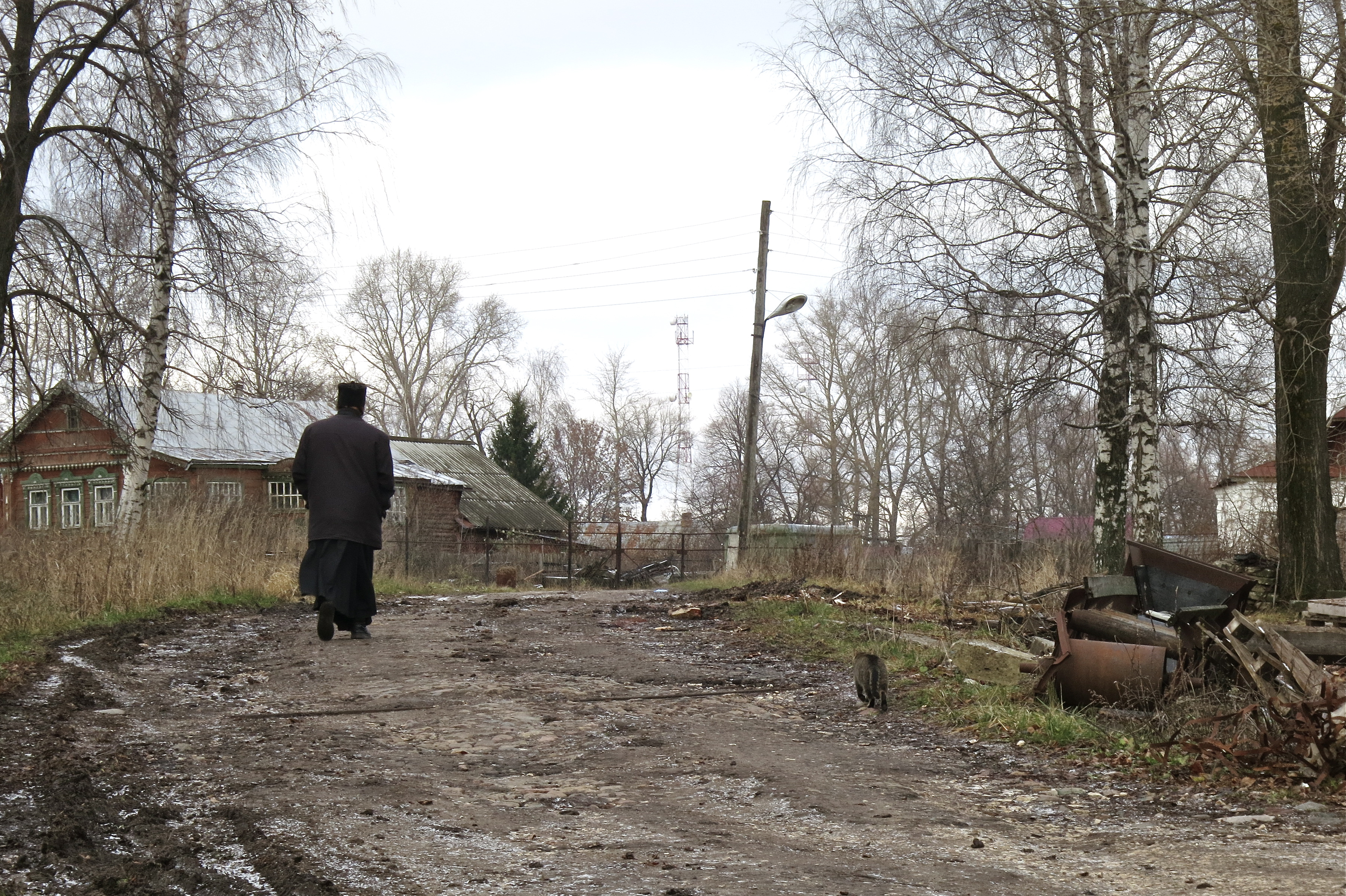
Holy Assumption Cosmo-Yakhromsky Monastery in Nebyloye.

Nebyloye (Russian: Небылое) is a rural locality (a selo) and the administrative center of Nebylovskoye Rural Settlement, Yuryev-Polsky District, Vladimir Oblast, Russia. The population was 1,528 as of 2010. There are 12 streets.

== Geography ==
Nebyloye is located on the Yakhroma River, 28 km southeast of Yuryev-Polsky (the district's administrative centre) by road. Andreyevskoye is the nearest rural locality.
