= Berezniki, Permsky District, Perm Krai =

Berezniki Березники
- Village
- Location within Perm Krai Location within Russia
- Coordinates: 57°48′N 56°24′E
- Country: Russia
- Region: Perm Krai
- District: Permsky District
- Time zone: UTC+5:00

Berezniki (Russian: Березники) is a rural locality (a village) in Lobanovskoye Rural Settlement, Permsky District, Perm Krai, Russia. The population was 23 as of 2010. There are 3 streets.

== Geography ==
Berezniki is located 32 km southeast of Perm (the district's administrative centre) by road. Mulyanka is the nearest rural locality.
