= Yuryev-Polsky (town) =

Town in Vladimir Oblast, Russia

Yuryev-Polsky Юрьев-Польский
- Town
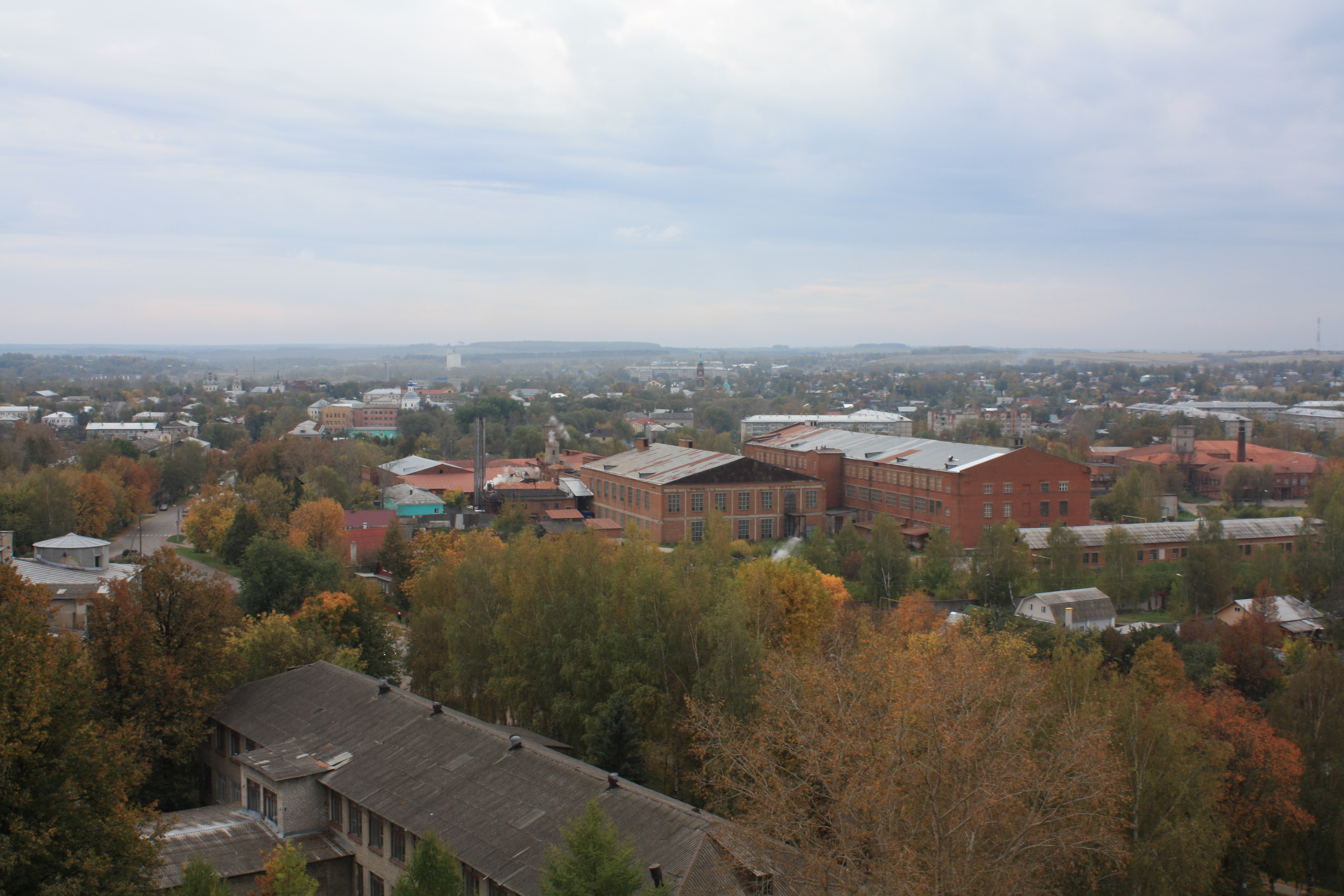
- View of Yuryev-Polsky

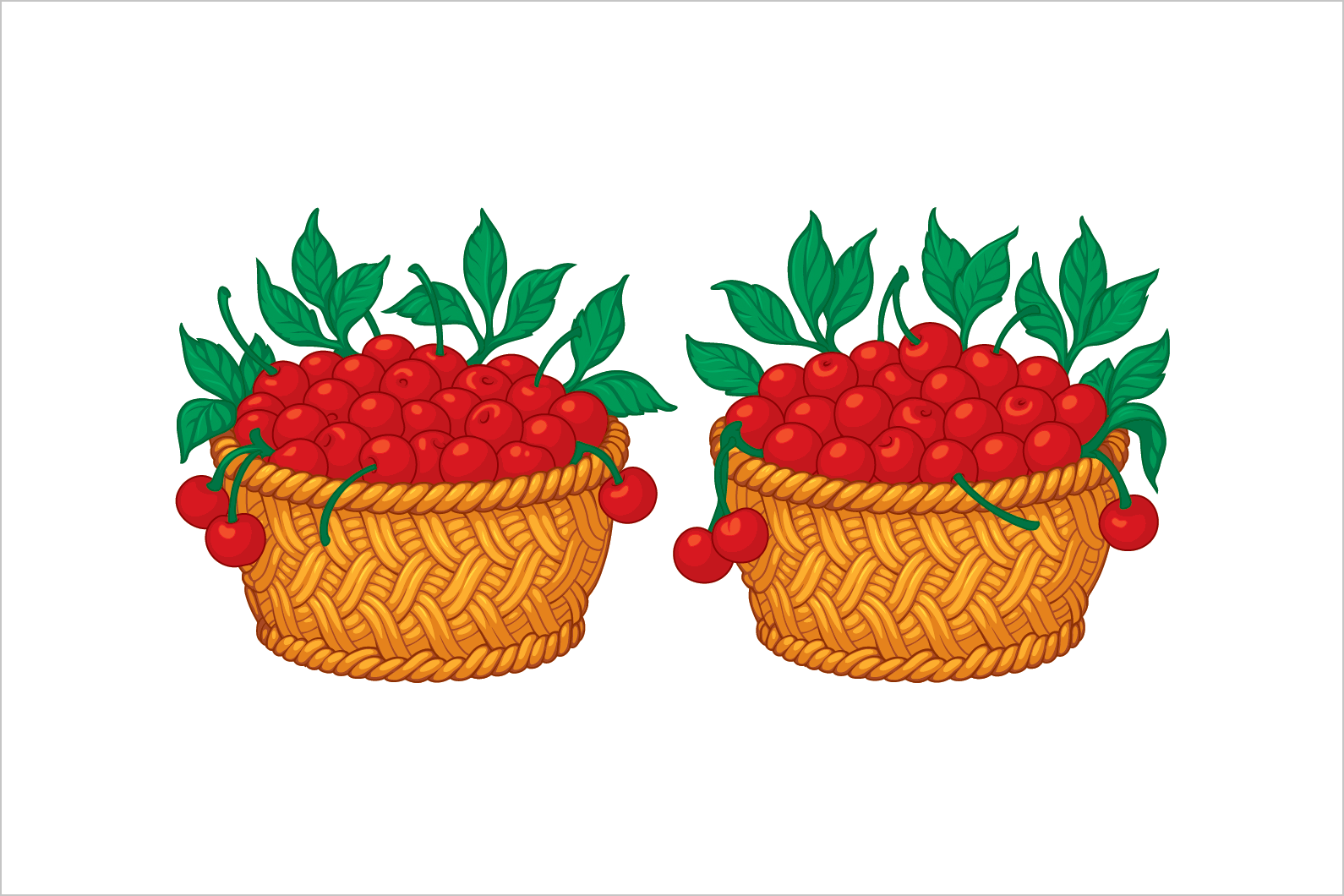
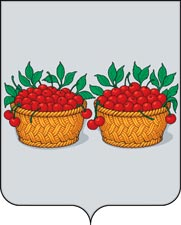
- Flag Coat of arms
- Interactive map of Yuryev-Polsky
- Location of Yuryev-Polsky Yuryev-Polsky (Vladimir Oblast)
- Coordinates: 56°30′N 39°41′E
- Country: Russia
- Federal subject: Vladimir Oblast
- Administrative district: Yuryev-Polsky District
- Founded: 1152
- Elevation: 140 m (460 ft)

Population (2010 Census)
  - Total: 19,595
  - Estimate (2021): 17,276 (−11.8%)

Administrative status
  - Capital of: Yuryev-Polsky District

Municipal status
  - Municipal district: Yuryev-Polsky Municipal District
  - Urban settlement: Yuryev-Polsky Urban Settlement
  - Capital of: Yuryev-Polsky Municipal District, Yuryev-Polsky Urban Settlement
- Time zone: UTC+3 (MSK)
- Postal code: 601800
- Dialing code: +7 49246
- OKTMO ID: 17656101001

Yuryev-Polsky (Russian: Ю́рьев-По́льский) is an old town and the administrative center of Yuryev-Polsky District of Vladimir Oblast, Russia, located in the upper reaches of the Koloksha River, 68 kilometers (42 mi) northwest of Vladimir, the administrative center of the oblast. Population: 17,276 (2021 census); 19,595 (2010 census); 19,906 (2002 census); 22,247 (1989 Soviet census); 23,000 (1974).

== History ==
It was founded by Yury Dolgoruky in 1152. The first part of its name derives from Yury's patron saint, St. George. The second part is derived from the word polsky meaning "in the fields". This specification was needed in order to distinguish the town from the earlier established fortress of Yuryev (nowadays Tartu), at the time located in the woods in what is now Estonia and then the biggest Russian settlement in the territory of the Chuds.

Upon Vsevolod III's death in 1212, the town was assigned to one of his youngest sons, Svyatoslav. It was that prince who personally designed the town's chief landmark, the Cathedral of St. George (1230–1234). It is the latest pre-Mongol construction in Russia, unprecedented in abundance of stone sculptures, and also the model for first stone churches in the Moscow Kremlin. In the 1460s, the cathedral's dome collapsed, thus burying most of unique sculptures which had adorned the cathedral walls. The collapsed roof was sloppily restored by a well-known Muscovite artisan, Vasili Yermolin, in 1471.

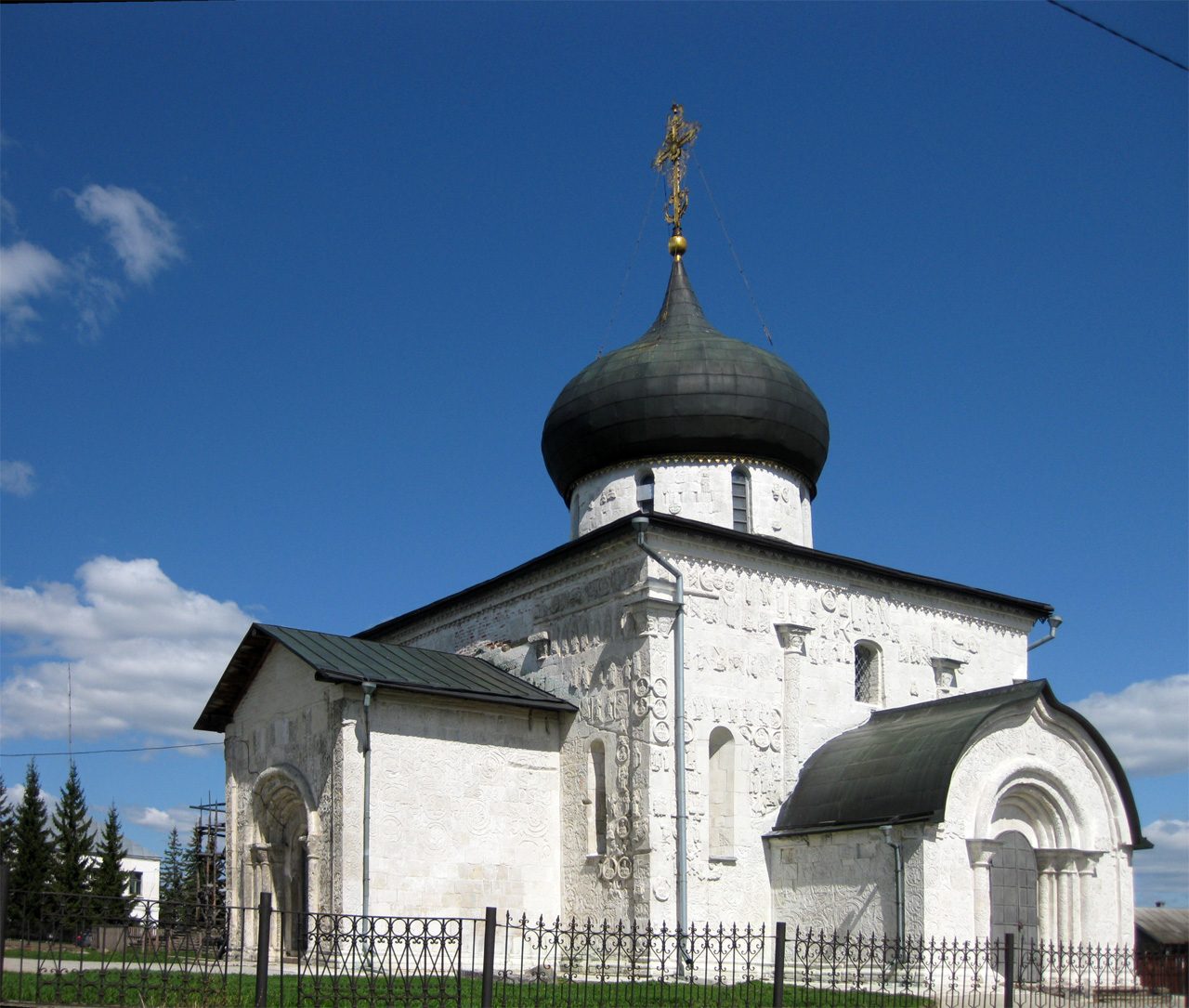
St. George's Cathedral (1230-1234) was the last stone church built in Russia before the Mongol invasion

The great Battle of Lipitsa was fought near the town in 1216. In 1238, Yuryev was sacked by the Mongols. A century later, it was incorporated into the Grand Duchy of Moscow. The chief monument of the Muscovite period is the walled Monastery of Archangel Michael, founded in the 13th century and containing various buildings from the 17th and 18th centuries. Several miles from Yuryev, on the bank of the Yakhroma River, stands the Kosmin Cloister, whose structures are typical for the mid-17th century.

== Administrative and municipal status ==
Within the framework of administrative divisions, Yuryev-Polsky serves as the administrative center of Yuryev-Polsky District, to which it is directly subordinated. As a municipal division, the town of Yuryev-Polsky is incorporated within Yuryev-Polsky Municipal District as Yuryev-Polsky Urban Settlement.

== Twin towns – sister cities ==
Yuryev-Polsky is twinned with:

- Hîncești, Moldova
