= Yuryev-Polsky District =

Yuryev-Polsky District Юрьев-Польский район (Russian)
- District
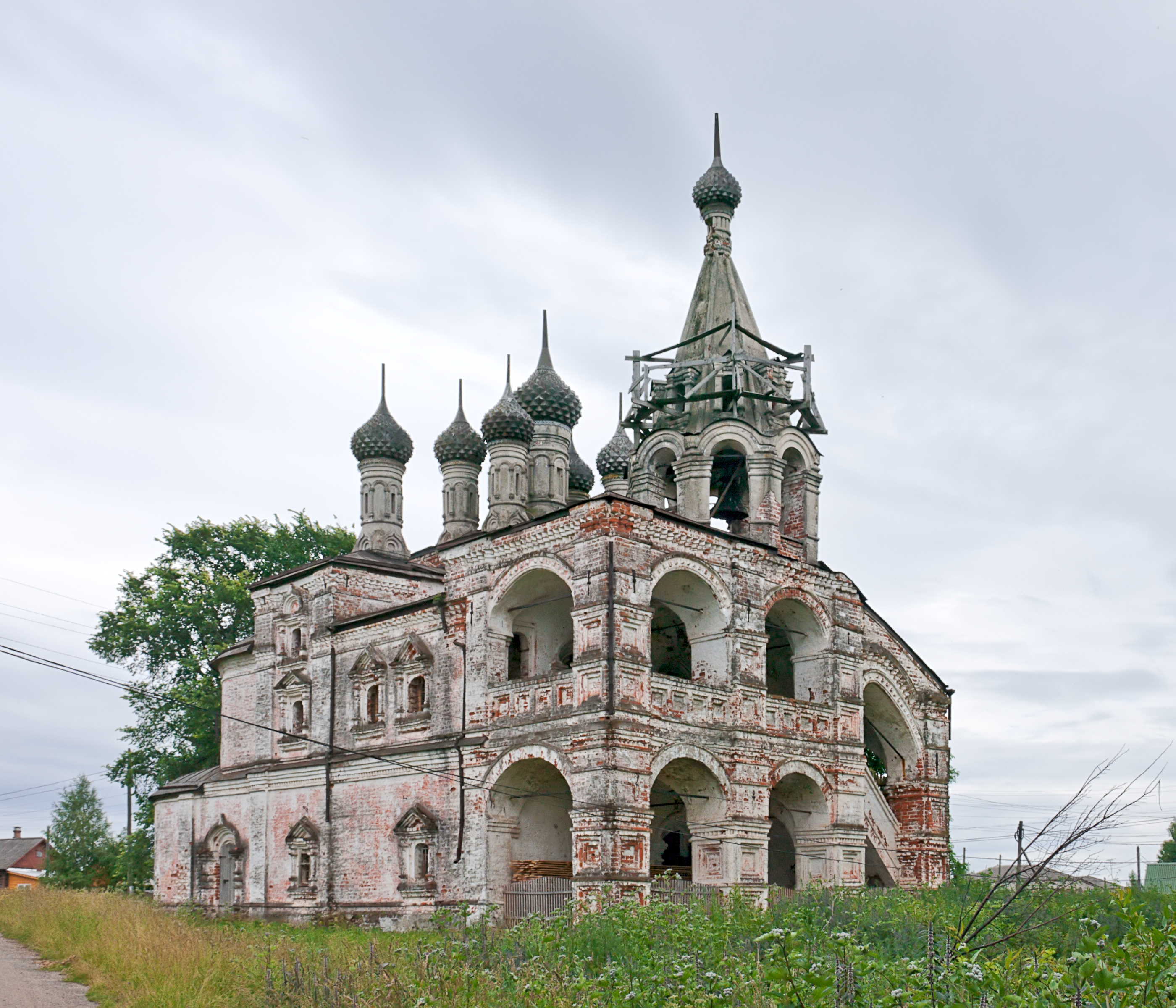
- The Trinity Church (1659) in the selo of Podolets

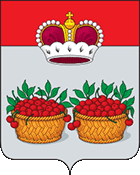
- Flag Coat of arms
- Location of Yuryev-Polsky District in Vladimir Oblast
- Coordinates: 56°30′N 39°41′E
- Country: Russia
- Federal subject: Vladimir Oblast
- Established: 10 April 1929
- Administrative center: Yuryev-Polsky

Area
  - Total: 1,910 km^{2} (740 sq mi)

Population (2010 Census)
  - Total: 36,747
  - Density: 19.2/km^{2} (49.8/sq mi)
  - Urban: 53.3%
  - Rural: 46.7%

Administrative structure
  - Inhabited localities: 1 cities/towns, 148 rural localities

Municipal structure
  - Municipally incorporated as: Yuryev-Polsky Municipal District
  - Municipal divisions: 1 urban settlements, 3 rural settlements
- Time zone: UTC+3 (MSK)
- OKTMO ID: 17656000
- Website: http://yp33.avo.ru/

Yuryev-Polsky District (Russian: Ю́рьев-По́льский райо́н) is an administrative and municipal district (raion), one of the sixteen in Vladimir Oblast, Russia. It is located in the northwest of the oblast. The area of the district is 1,910 square kilometers (740 sq mi). Its administrative center is the town of Yuryev-Polsky. Population: 31,961 (2021 census); 36,747 (2010 census); 39,023 (2002 Census); 42,219 (1989 Soviet census). The population of the administrative center accounts for 54.1% of the district's total population.

== Sources ==
- Законодательное Собрание Владимирской области. Закон №130-ОЗ от 10 декабря 2001 г. «Об административно-территориальном устройстве Владимирской области и о порядке его изменения», в ред. Закона №22-ОЗ от 18 марта 2014 г. «О признании утратившими силу части 1 статьи 15 Закона Владимирской области "Об административно-территориальном устройстве Владимирской области и о порядке его изменения" и пункта 3 статьи 1 Закона Владимирской области "О внесении изменений в Закон Владимирской области "Об административно-территориальном устройстве Владимирской области и о порядке его изменения"». Вступил в силу со дня официального опубликования (13 декабря 2001 г.). Опубликован: "Владимирские ведомости", №232, 13 декабря 2001 г. (Legislative Assembly of Vladimir Oblast. Law #130-OZ of December 10, 2001 On the Administrative-Territorial Structure of Vladimir Oblast and on Procedures for Its Change, as amended by the Law #22-OZ of March 18, 2014 On Abrogating Part 1 of Article 15 of the Law of Vladimir Oblast "On the Administrative-Territorial Structure of Vladimir Oblast and on Procedures for Its Change" and Item 3 of Article 1 of the Law of Vladimir Oblast "On Amending the Law of Vladimir Oblast "On the Administrative-Territorial Structure of Vladimir Oblast and on Procedures for Its Change". Effective as of the day of the official publication (December 13, 2001).).
- Администрация Владимирской области. Постановление №433 от 13 июня 2007 г. «О реестре административно-территориальных образований и единиц Владимирской области», в ред. Постановления №169 от 5 марта 2015 г. «О внесении изменения в Постановление Губернатора области от 13.06.2007 №433 "О реестре административно-территориальных образований и единиц Владимирской области"». Вступил в силу со дня официального опубликования. Опубликован: "Владимирские ведомости", №114, 20 июня 2007 г. (Administration of Vladimir Oblast. Resolution #433 of June 13, 2007 On the Registry of the Administrative-Territorial Formations and Units of Vladimir Oblast, as amended by the Resolution #169 of March 5, 2015 On Amending Resolution #433 of the Oblast Governor of June 13, 2007 "On the Registry of the Administrative-Territorial Formations and Units of Vladimir Oblast". Effective as of the day of the official publication.).
- Законодательное Собрание Владимирской области. Закон №55-ОЗ от 11 мая 2005 г. «О наделении Юрьев-Польского района и вновь образованных муниципальных образований, входящих в его состав, соответствующим статусом муниципальных образований и установлении их границ», в ред. Закона №54-ОЗ от 14 июня 2012 г. «О внесении изменений в Приложение 8-1 к Закону Владимирской области "О наделении Юрьев-Польского района и вновь образованных муниципальных образований, входящих в его состав, соответствующим статусом муниципальных образований и установлении их границ"». Вступил в силу со дня официального опубликования (17 мая 2005 г.). Опубликован: "Владимирские ведомости", №156–157, 17 мая 2005 г. (Legislative Assembly of Vladimir Oblast. Law #55-OZ of May 11, 2005 On Granting Yuryev-Polsky District and the Newly Established Municipal Formations It Comprises an Appropriate Status of the Municipal Formations and on Establishing Their Borders, as amended by the Law #54-OZ of June 14, 2012 On Amending Appendix 8-1 to the Law of Vladimir Oblast "On Granting Yuryev-Polsky District and the Newly Established Municipal Formations It Comprises an Appropriate Status of the Municipal Formations and on Establishing Their Borders". Effective as of the day of the official publication (May 17, 2005).).
