= The City of Universal Welfare =

1914 painting by Russian artist Efim Chestnyakov

- Artist: Efim Chestnyakov
- Year: 1914
- Type: Oil on canvas
- Dimensions: 198 cm × 335 cm (78 in × 132 in)
- Location: Kostroma State Historical, Architectural and Art Museum-Reserve, Kostroma

The City of Universal Welfare (Russian: Город Всеобщего Благоденствия; inventory KP-21) is a painting by Russian and Soviet artist Efim Chestnyakov (pseudonym of Yevfimiy Vasilyevich Samuilov). The painting is his largest known pictorial work, which survived in isolated fragments and was reconstructed through the efforts of restorers V. M. Tanaev and S. S. Golushkin. Various researchers of Chestnyakov's work date the canvas somewhere between the end of the 19th and the middle of the 20th century. After the death of the artist, the inhabitants of his native village, Shablovo, took away everything that remained at that time in his house. Fragments of the painting ended up with different people but survived and were subsequently given by the owners to the staff of the Kostroma State Museum Reserve of the History of Architecture and Arts. Currently, The City of Universal Welfare is part of its collection and is exhibited in the Romanov Museum of Kostroma at the permanent exhibition My Forgotten, Native... (about the work of Efim Vasilyevich Chestnyakov). The main theme of this multidimensional canvas, according to the director of the Kostroma Museum-Reserve, Victor Ignatiev, is "the unity of all living on earth for the common good". The City of Universal Welfare is evaluated by art historians as one of the most significant works of the artist.

Researchers compared the canvas to "a grand choral action, in which the most ordinary actions, poses, and positions receive almost ritual meaning". In the absence of any particular plot in the painting, it can not only be viewed but also narrated, as Efim Chestnyakov himself did, "each time fantasising in a new way". According to Igor Shavarinsky, a candidate of cultural studies, "the dominant value of his [the artist's] hierarchy was the idea of Universal Welfare — the creation of a man-made paradise on earth, spiritualised by love for one's neighbour".

== History ==
=== Date and title ===
Efim Chestnyakov did not sign or date his works. The future researcher of Chestnyakov's work and biographer, I. A. Serov, who visited the artist at home after World War II, saw the painting on the wall of the studio. He noted that the colours were then fresh and much brighter than they are at present.

The exact time of the painting is not documented. The catalog of the exhibition of paintings and graphics by Efim Chestnyakov in Riga in 1983 cautiously indicated that the artist's works presented there, including The City of Universal Welfare, were probably painted in the 1910s–1930s. It is generally believed that by the late 1930s, Chestnyakov had stopped painting and focused on literature and working with children. Igor Shavarinsky, kandidat of cultural studies, attributed the origination of the idea for this painting to the turn of the 19th and 20th centuries, when the artist lived in St. Petersburg (December 1899–spring 1903). There, he studied at the sculpture museum of the Imperial Academy of Arts, attended the St. Petersburg Drawing School of Princess M. K. Tenisheva for two years, and was influenced by the Silver Age of Russian culture, with its inherent syncretism and symbolism. Chestnyakov's second stay in the capital, from May 1904 to the fall of 1905, is only documented by his participation in a demonstration and subsequent police supervision. Essayist and writer Vasily Golovanov attributed the "mythological motifs" and "images-symbols" characteristic of the painting to the years 1905–1913, when the artist lived in the village of Shablovo after leaving St. Petersburg and before his third and final trip to the capital. During 1913–1914, Chestnyakov studied in the academic workshop of Dmitry Kardovsky, experienced significant material difficulties, and managed to achieve relative success. For instance, he published a book, The Artist's Art, through the Russian Academy of Sciences.

Svetlana Katkova, a senior researcher in the storage department of the Kostroma Museum-Reserve, suggested that if we consider the images she identified on the canvas —such as churches destroyed or adapted into a penal ostrog or a penal colony— the painting could be dated to a time after the second arrest of the artist's sister Alexandra, in 1948. For instance, Katkova interpreted an ostrog in the painting as a building with a canopy resembling a watchtower, featuring a small window through which people look out, with an exit possible only through a pipe. Other elements she highlighted include a scarecrow holding a "rustling brooms", people in blue, and other imagery supporting this later dating. Katkova also argued that the painting's limited color palette supports a post-1948 date. She attributed this to the cheap paints the artist was forced to use due to financial difficulties, likely diluted with kerosene, which later darkened the colors. Chestnyakov's financial struggles began in 1937, following the first arrest of his sister Alexandra. According to Katkova, the painting reflects the aftermath of the active phase of the anti-church campaign. The temples depicted on the canvas had already been supplemented with household outbuildings and repurposed for domestic functions. In Katkova's opinion, further arguments supporting the idea that the painting was created after World War II include the almost complete absence of adult men and young men among its characters, as well as the themes characteristic of Soviet painting from the 1930s to the 1950s—such as collective farm holidays and mass processions with gifts of nature.

The original title of the painting The City of Universal Welfare is unknown. One theory suggests it might have been titled The Future, or the City of Universal Welfare. According to I. A. Serov, who knew Chestnyakov well, the artist himself referred to the canvas as The World of Sunshine and Happiness. The staff of the Kostroma Museum-Reserve attempted unsuccessfully to find the painting's title in the artist's notes or archival sources. The title The City of Universal Welfare, now widely accepted in art history, was assigned to the painting by Vladimir Makarov, an employee of the Kostroma Museum-Reserve. Svetlana Katkova noted that in the last years of his life, Chestnyakov worked on an unfinished canvas entitled Past - Present - Future, which cannot be identified with any of the artist's surviving works. In her view, the three horizontal tiers visible in The City of Universal Welfare suggest a possible connection to this title.

=== Provenance ===
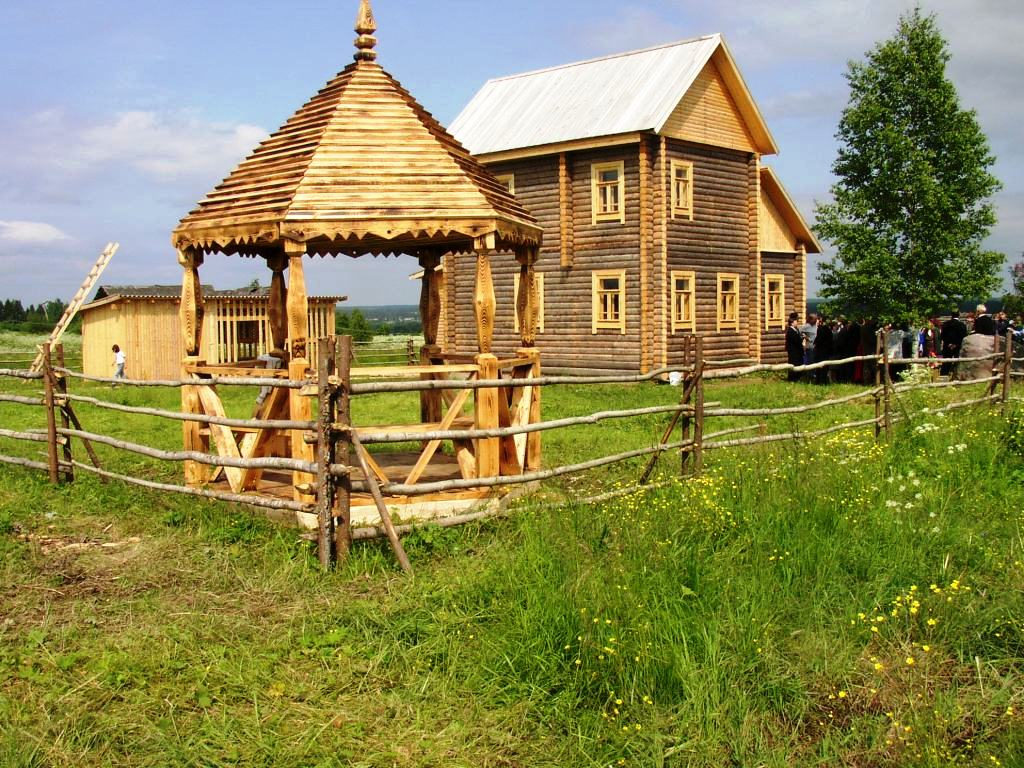
Chestnyakov's barn in Shablovo reconstructed by fellow villagers as a memorial museum; the original house where the artist lived has not been preserved.

Journalist Larisa Golushkina, author of numerous articles on Chestniakov's biography and work, believed that The City of Universal Welfare, like many other paintings by the artist, was connected to the trinity of his creative process: first, he wrote a fairy tale; then, he illustrated it (or painted a canvas inspired by it); and finally, he staged a performance based on its plot. According to Igor Shavarinsky, the painting could have been used as a backdrop for a performance based on the artist's literary works, such as the fairy tales Shablovskiy Tarantas, or The Tale of the Winged Men. Shavarinsky suggested that during Chestniakov's lifetime, the painting was kept in a space the artist referred to as the "barn". This dwelling, where Chestniakov began living in the 1930s following the exile of one sister and the death of the other, was also called the "shalashka", the "universal collegium", and the Collegium of Sciences and Arts. The artist envisioned it as a place to teach fellow villagers painting, sculpture, music, architecture, engineering, occult sciences, linguistics, astronomy, theater, and film theory. The house consisted of two old log cabins, a bathhouse, and a barn. The canvas was located on the first floor, where the artist hosted theatrical performances for his fellow villagers. Children participated in these performances, molding clay masks and sewing costumes. Chestniakov referred to these performances as "festivals".

After the artist's death in 1961, his niece, Galina Smirnova, appealed to the district department of culture with a proposal to transfer his paintings, sculptures, and manuscripts to the museum for preservation, but her request was denied. At the time, Efim Chestniakov's works were dismissed as primitive pictures of no art historical value, and they were left in his empty house in Shablovo. The paintings and sculptures began to be taken by village children and later by their parents. Some villagers considered Chestniakov a saint and a prophet, believing that his possessions could bring healing from illness.

In the summer of 1968, the staff of the Kostroma Museum-Reserve —chief curator Vladimir Makarov, senior researcher Vera Lebedeva, and artist-restorer Gennady Korff— embarked on a research expedition to the Makaryevsky, Manturovsky, and Kologrivsky districts of the Kostroma region. Their goal was to search for folk art objects, works of Old Russian art, and pieces by amateur craftsmen. By chance, a fellow traveler who had boarded the museum bus mentioned that paintings and clay sculptures had been left behind in the village of Shablovo after the death of a local artist. Art historians were surprised by the high quality of the works they discovered. The creator of the artist's museum and his biographer, Ruslan Obukhov, wrote that Vladimir Makarov went into one of the houses to ask for water. As he crossed the threshold, he stumbled, and his gaze fell on a doormat, under which he recognized an oil painting hidden beneath a layer of dirt. It turned out to be the first fragment of The City of Universal Welfare. Having collected all the fragments and spread them out in a meadow among other paintings, the researchers did not yet realize that these five fragments formed a single composition. Later, it was Makarov who suggested that some paintings might be parts of one large work by the artist.

By the time The City of Universal Welfare was presented to the researchers, the painting had been cut into five parts (Vasily Golovanov mistakenly wrote that it had been cut into seven parts). The date and circumstances of this event remain unknown. D. V. Gromov and A. D. Sokolova openly wrote that The City of Universal Welfare was "torn into shreds-amulets" by the villagers.

Katkova noted that the cuts of the canvas were made on the background and did not get on the figures. Only the artist himself could have done that. She suggested that since he took the paintings to his "festivals", it may have been easier to transport such a large canvas in pieces. If the painting was not intended for festivals, the canvas was thus hidden from "undue attention" and dangerous interpretation for the author.

The painting was in good condition when it came into the hands of the museum staff, and there were no losses even along the edges of the cuts. The restorers only needed to fit the pieces together and duplicate them so that the seams were invisible. Moscow restorers V. Tanaev and S. Golushkin selected these five fragments from the poorly preserved canvases that made up the artist's heritage, suggesting that they had been united by the artist into a single composition. The painting became the first restored work by Efim Chestnyakov.

=== Preparation and technique ===
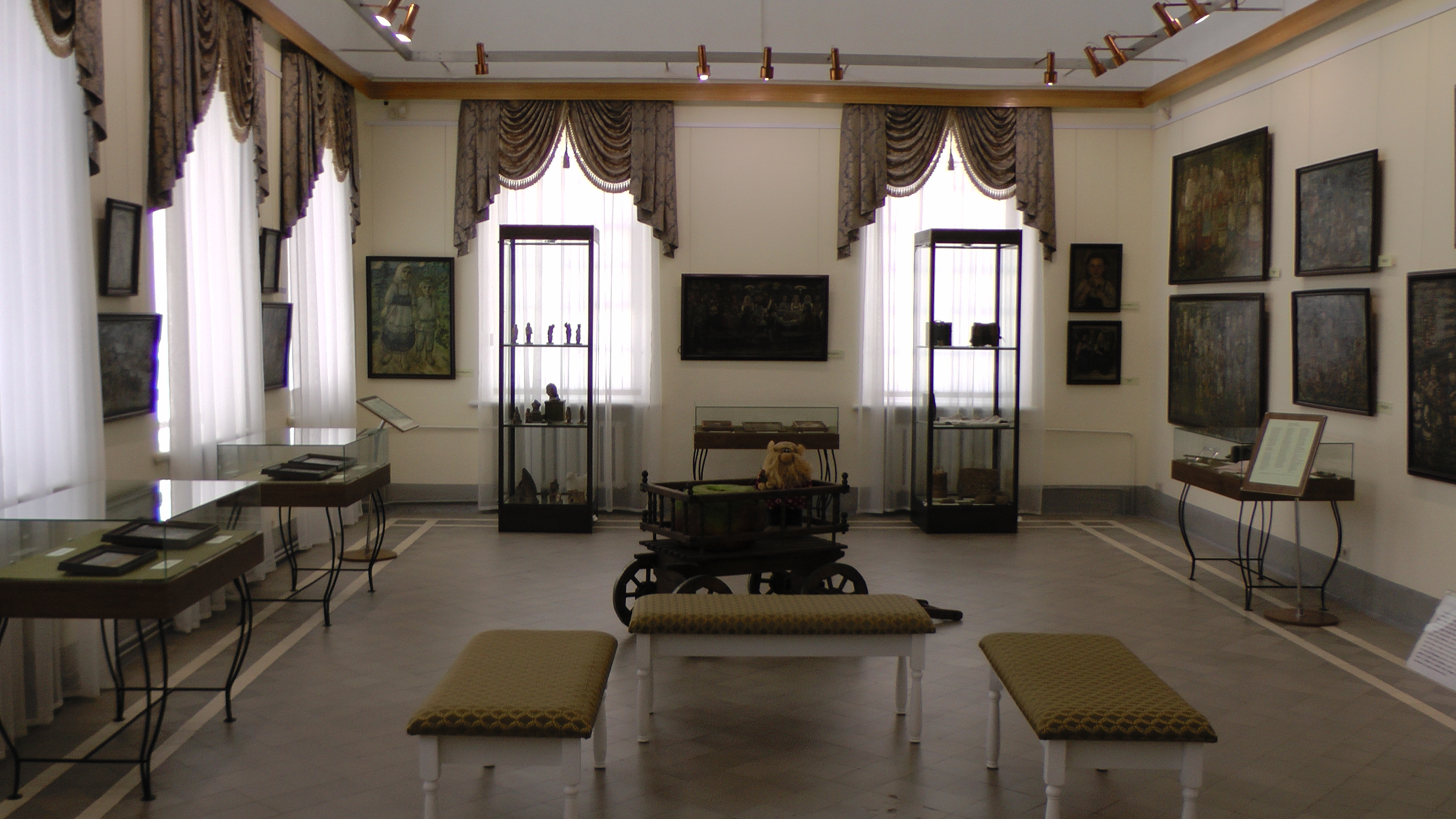
E. Chestnyakov Hall in the Kostroma Romanov Museum

The technique of the painting is oil on canvas. Its dimensions are 198 by 335 cm (or, according to other sources, 195 x 330 cm). It belongs to the collection of the Kostroma State Historical-Architectural and Art Museum-Reserve (inventory number KP-21). It has been presented at numerous exhibitions. In particular, the canvas is mentioned in the catalog of the 1977 exhibition in Moscow in the "Painting" section. Currently, it is on display at the Romanov Museum as part of the permanent exhibition My Forgotten, Native... (the work of Efim Vasilievich Chestnyakov)".

A painting by Efim Chestnyakov titled Fairy Tale Motif (canvas, oil, Kostroma Museum-Reserve, Inventory No. 63, restorer M. Furdik, 148 x 149 cm or 148.6 x 151.7) has survived. Igor Shavarinsky regarded it as "an element of a diptych on the theme of The City of Universal Welfare" and noted significant similarities with the larger painting. Among the works of the artist presented at the 1977 exhibition in Moscow and the 1983 exhibition in Riga was a sketch for The City of Universal Welfare, created in watercolor on paper (size 26 x 42 cm, Kostroma Museum-Reserve, KP-2602). According to Shavarinsky, in this sketch the artist was exploring the right compositional solution for the painting, with a group of children, grandmothers, and grandfathers, and an angel wearing bast shoes. The corresponding fragment of the canvas closely mirrors the watercolor. Only a few characters are missing, including a large bear and a fat girl, which the artist eventually abandoned in the final painting. Another sketch located in the artist's album (listed as Sketch for the painting The City of Universal Welfare, album, spread, Kostroma Museum-Reserve, without inventory number) and close to the left part of the foreground of the painting (featuring two adjoining staircases, an old man with a broom, a gentleman in a top hat with a cane, and a married couple in white suits...) was presented in the book Efim Chestnyakov. New Discoveries of Soviet Restorers. In Katkova's opinion, the watercolor and the album drawing are not fully sketches for the canvas The City of Universal Welfare, but from them, the idea for the painting later developed, and their characters play an important role in the composition of the large painting. She noted that the watercolor and drawing do not include the temples or the "gifts and offerings" that play a key role in the final version of the painting.

== Description ==
The City of Universal Welfare is a huge canvas with a large number of characters (Victor Ignatiev counted 120 people, each with their own personality and performing their own action). The characters include children, adults, old men, boys and girls. Everyone is busy with his own business: an old man sweeps the street, an old woman knocks over sour cream, a boy plays the pipe, a girl beats the tambourine and another girl dances, people rest on the balcony of the palace and watch what happens in the square. Lev Dyakov wrote that it was impossible to describe this "enormous fresco" because it lacked the usual "coordinates" of an ordinary canvas. In his opinion, it is an "other world".

=== Composition ===
Viktor Ignatiev and Evgeny Trofimov said that, although the composition of the painting seems chaotic to the viewer at first glance, it actually follows a certain logical structure (in another of his books, Ignatiev wrote that the lack of a unified urban plan is due to the gradualness of the improvements that take place in the city). In front of the audience is not just a city with its typical building and not just a real village, as it looks like in the northern regions of Russia, where the artist lived and which he knew well. (Note: In his other book (Efim Vasilievich Chestnyakov) Victor Ignatiev, on the contrary, calls the settlement depicted by the artist a village and states that it resembles the village of Shablovo or "any other in the upper reaches of the Unzha".) This town-village reminds one of Shablovo from a fairy tale composed by Chestnyakov. Cosy village churches, huts, and stone city chambers coexist peacefully there. Dyakov noted that the artist tried to 'accommodate' in the space of the picture all the spiritual values of the people, not dividing it into peasants and townspeople. The whole composition of the painting is built densely, as if according to an already known and well-thought-out scheme. According to researchers, it seems that the work of Efim Chestnyakov is like a weaver's work on a tapestry. He starts it from the bottom but initially imagines where each element of the cloth will be located.

According to Viktor Ignatyev, Chestnyakov's composition in this painting is fundamentally different from his earlier works. It is distinguished by its multiplanarity and "a complex rhythm of colouristic architectonics". The viewer's first glance is drawn to the procession of boys and girls depicted in the left part of the composition. This stream of people passes by a seated old man with a ladle in his hands and an old woman whipping sour cream, eventually heading towards the white stone palace. In the theatre square, the movement forms a complex pattern, which, as the researcher believes, obeys some kind of musical rhythm (this is emphasised by the artist through the depiction of a boy playing a pipe and a girl beating a tambourine). Then this crowd moves upwards, passing through a narrow archway and, after that, toward the palace, where citizens stand on the balcony watching the procession. Igor Shavarinsky, a researcher of the artist's work, identified two large sections on the canvas. According to him, the picture is divided by objects —symbols of labour and celebration held by the inhabitants— into the left side, "where labour and its abundant fruits dominate", and the right side, "with relaxation and celebration".

Svetlana Katkova evaluates the composition of the painting differently. She states that, horizontally, the city depicted in the painting is divided into three parts. The first tier is recessed, the second rises above it as if over a cliff, and the third is hidden behind a stone wall. All the tiers are connected by "a broad staircase of three flights". The artist, in her opinion, also divided the picture vertically. On the right, he placed the manor house with columns and a terrace. The characters in this part of the painting are dressed in urban costumes. On the left, rural buildings predominate, and the characters are dressed in rustic attire. According to Katkova, the traditions of the pre-Petrine era prevail here (shirts, puttees, kaftans, sarafans —all of them made of homespun cloth— and long beards). At the border of these two worlds, there is a flower in a pot and a young man in a blue suit (which the researcher interprets as resembling the uniform of an NKVD officer of the post-war period) with a white collar and a hat, as well as a "black arch". In the composition, Katkova observed a clear opposition between these two worlds: log huts and stone houses, village gatherings ("conversations") and theatrical performances in the city. The contrast is further emphasised by the darkened foreground, where a disconnected family of villagers appears, and the illuminated background, showcasing a harmonious family of strolling city dwellers.

Katkova noted that there is no main character in the painting, here, "as in the flow of life, there are simultaneously different groups of people, connected or opposed to each other". The painting is filled with figures and buildings, which is why the sky is almost invisible. According to her, the main figures in the painting are the temples. This follows from an analysis of the composition of the painting. The temples are located at the intersection of two diagonals of the canvas. During the World War II, according to the memories of his compatriots, the artist prayed in secret and even held services with widows in the forest. In his earlier paintings, there are images of churches, but the temples on them with crosses and bell towers, unlike The City of Universal Welfare. The building with the columns is the most luminous in the painting, its attic "the only rigid, extended horizontal line that cuts through the jumble of rather impersonal industrial architecture and draws the eye to the centre". This building itself contains a series of disparate columns, on the fence of the terrace — a vegetal ornament in stucco. A rude interference in the Empire facade of the building seems to Katkova inserted in the wall ridiculous inverted window with a shutter, as if borrowed from a village hut.

=== Colouring ===
Viktor Ignatiev believed that the colouring solution of the painting corresponds to the main theme of the work: "the unity of all living on earth for the common good". Warm brownish-ochre tones may symbolise bread, while turquoise-blue dales represent "the future, distant, eternal, and peaceful"[6]. Igor Shavarinsky, a candidate of cultural studies, wrote in his dissertation that "the dramaturgical element of Chestnyakov's paintings lies in the vivid colour (the energy of colour is transformed into the active dynamics of the unfolding action, creating a dialogue atmosphere) and the compositional solution".

Kostroma local historian and art historian Svetlana Katkova, who studies the artist's work, approached her analysis of the painting by focusing on its colour scheme. She expressed surprise that the artist used such gloomy colours to convey a "light" idea. These dark tones are further accentuated by what she described as the "lethargy" and "disconnectedness" of the characters. Because of this, Katkova questioned the long-standing analogies drawn by researchers between the painting City of Universal Welfare and Chestnyakov's literary utopias, as well as his sculptural clay fantasies on the theme of the city of Kordon.

== Interpretation ==
=== Literary illustration ===
Viktor Ignatiev and Evgeny Trofimov stated that the painting "well recognises" the artist's literary experience, particularly his work Shablovo Tarantas. Shavarinsky even notes: "From the course of the narrative, the reader learns the prehistory of the construction of the The City of Universal Welfare depicted in the painting of the same name". The plot of Shablovo Tarantas is relatively simple: the villagers of Shablovo gather and build a large tarantas (a traditional Russian wagon). They harness all their horses to it and travel to Kologriv. After purchasing goods, they return to the village. The peasants, inspired by their shared labour, decide to build a wall around Shablovo together. The result is an unusually large house, with huts and gardens growing inside. They even construct a large communal oven and begin baking pies and cakes together.

Lev Dyakov argued that Efim Chestnyakov's pictorial works are deeply permeated with the rhythms of music and poetry. He drew analogies between the painting and Chestnyakov's cycle of poems Marko Beschastny, noting that these poems contain a "word" that closely aligns with the mood of The City of Universal Welfare:

"Then surrounded by some '

dressed up people

'I'll come to the rising

City of Light.

And From the abundant grapevine

branches

I'll be glad to

pluck the fruit up".

Marko Beschastny (preserved only in fragments) is a utopian novel in verse and a sequel to the fairy tale Shablovsky Tarantas. The text combines prose with verse. The protagonist —Marko Beschastny— is a prophet without private property and without "fractional perception of the world in the name of synthetic freedom" — builds a village of the future. In this village, brick houses replace log dwellings, and, decorated with statues, it begins to resemble a small town rather than a traditional village. Through Marko's conversations with "strangers" (the hero's sceptical opponents), Chestnyakov meticulously described his vision of The City of Universal Welfare. Among the features described are "a wonderful transparent roof", a theatre, an extraordinary oven with huge pans, man-made waterfalls and dams, a massive greenhouse, aeroplanes, and "a common house the length of the whole village" with marvellous rooms and passages. Some details of the canvas, according to Shavarinsky, can only be fully understood by reading Marko. For example, in the middle of the painting, there is a wooden hut. In Marko, the characters, wishing to "preserve our culture in the past, so that new ideas of the old way of life do not disturb", decide to preserve the ancient hut of "baushka" (old woman) Varvara. To the right of the church in the painting, there is an entrance to a cave. According to Marko, this represents the entrance to a dungeon formed by the mining of clay used to make bricks for the city's construction. Shavarinsky also identified motifs related to The City of Universal Welfare in The Tale of the Winged People, another work by Chestnyakov. This tale envisions the city's future, where it has gained worldwide fame. Hard labour has been eliminated, and "only everyone plays there like children — [there are] theatres and other places of common joy".

Igor Shavarinsky, in his PhD thesis, compared the literary texts, the painting The City of Universal Welfare, and the sculptures of Efim Chestnyakov. For a long time, the artist created small-sized sculptural images made of clay to represent the "population" of the City of Universal Welfare, where each figure "occupied its own place", "was in harmony with itself, and was happy from doing its own thing". In old photographs taken by the artist himself, about ten clay buildings can be discerned, with which Chestnyakov sought to depict the city-village. In one of the photographs, a "clay" old man is shown eating porridge from a pot in a manner similar to the scene in the painting The City of Universal Welfare. Another photograph features a church and an "entrance to the dungeon". These same elements are described in Chestnyakov's poem Marko Beschastny and depicted in the painting The City of Universal Welfare. One of the artist's fellow villagers recalled: "Upstairs in the artist's house, under a cloth canopy of six meters, were arranged clay figures of the City of Universal Welfare. He used to give performances there for the children and comment on who should be called what".

=== Utopian representation ===
The authors of the dictionary Amateur Artistic Creativity in Russia of the 20th Century interpreted Efim Chestnyakov's painting as "a pictorial embodiment of a peasant utopia with narodniki-socialist shades". (Note: The same point of view is expressed in Konstantin Isupov's book Metaphysics of Dostoevsky. The author compares Chestnyakov's picture with the literary socialist utopias of the Soviet economist and sociologist Alexander Chayanov.) In their view, the painting is closely related to Shablovo's Tarantas, as it too embodies the same social ideal. The dictionary states that the plot of The City of Universal Welfare is organized like a ritual action. From the perspective of the dictionary authors, the canvas depicts not a city, but a large village, albeit one surrounded by walls. The peasants are shown engaging in everyday activities or resting, but the canvas is imbued with "ritual seriousness".

From Shavarinsky's perspective, all the figures on the canvas express a common idea — the achievement of universal prosperity through collective effort. Young men and women carry huge pies, kringles, grapes, and a variety of other foodstuffs, which are also stacked on benches and the roofs of houses (the artist depicts the houses in three versions: in section, from the outside, and from the inside). These items are not sold but simply distributed to children. A festive performance takes place in the square near the palace. Shavarinsky calculated that the white-stone palace (which he considered to be a palace of arts) occupies one-sixth of the painting. Nearby, a girl is seen hanging a poster on a column about an upcoming performance.

From under the arch (Shavarinsky emphasized that neither of the two arches has gates closing the entrance to the city), a whole crowd pours into the city. In a monograph dedicated to the artist's work, Ignatiev and Trofimov noted that in the movement of this stream of people and the figures of individual characters, there is neither expression nor dynamics. Everything is done slowly, progressively, rigorously, and uninterruptedly.

Viktor Ignatyev and Yevgeny Trofimov wondered whether the artist depicted a holiday or an episode of everyday life. In their view, the answer lies in the analysis of the image: everything in the picture is abundant—pies, bread, berries, and fruits are presented in large quantities. The people are calm and peaceful, and the figures are static in their postures and movements. The viewer is led to believe that this is not a holiday, but a normal, familiar way of life. In the past, when abundance suddenly appeared (which was typically associated with a holiday in people's minds), it would prompt expressions of joy. The researchers concluded that the artist portrays a "normal", familiar life. In this sense, Chestnyakov, according to Ignatyev and Trofimov, depicted a model of a new world — a new life in which the past, present, and future are united, and everyday life does not differ from a holiday.

A slightly different point of view was expressed by T. P. Sukhareva. In her opinion, the artist sought to convey in both the painting The City of Universal Welfare and the story Shablovsky Tarantas the idea of universal welfare through the construction of "universal peasant culture". In this context, "the monotony of everyday life turns into a holiday". From Sukhareva's perspective, the artist shows that "material prosperity is achieved not at the Pike's Behest, but through reasonable, painstaking labor". Chestnyakov's signs of fairy-tale utopia include absolute comfort, universal employment, mutual respect, and the absence of offense. She noted that Chestnyakov's fantasies could have been fueled by real observations: in the village of Ekimtsevo in 1892, a unique agricultural school complex was built with the funds of the Russian industrialist, public figure, and scientist F. V. Chizhov, and an arboretum was established, where exotic shrubs and flowers grew.

=== Symbolism ===
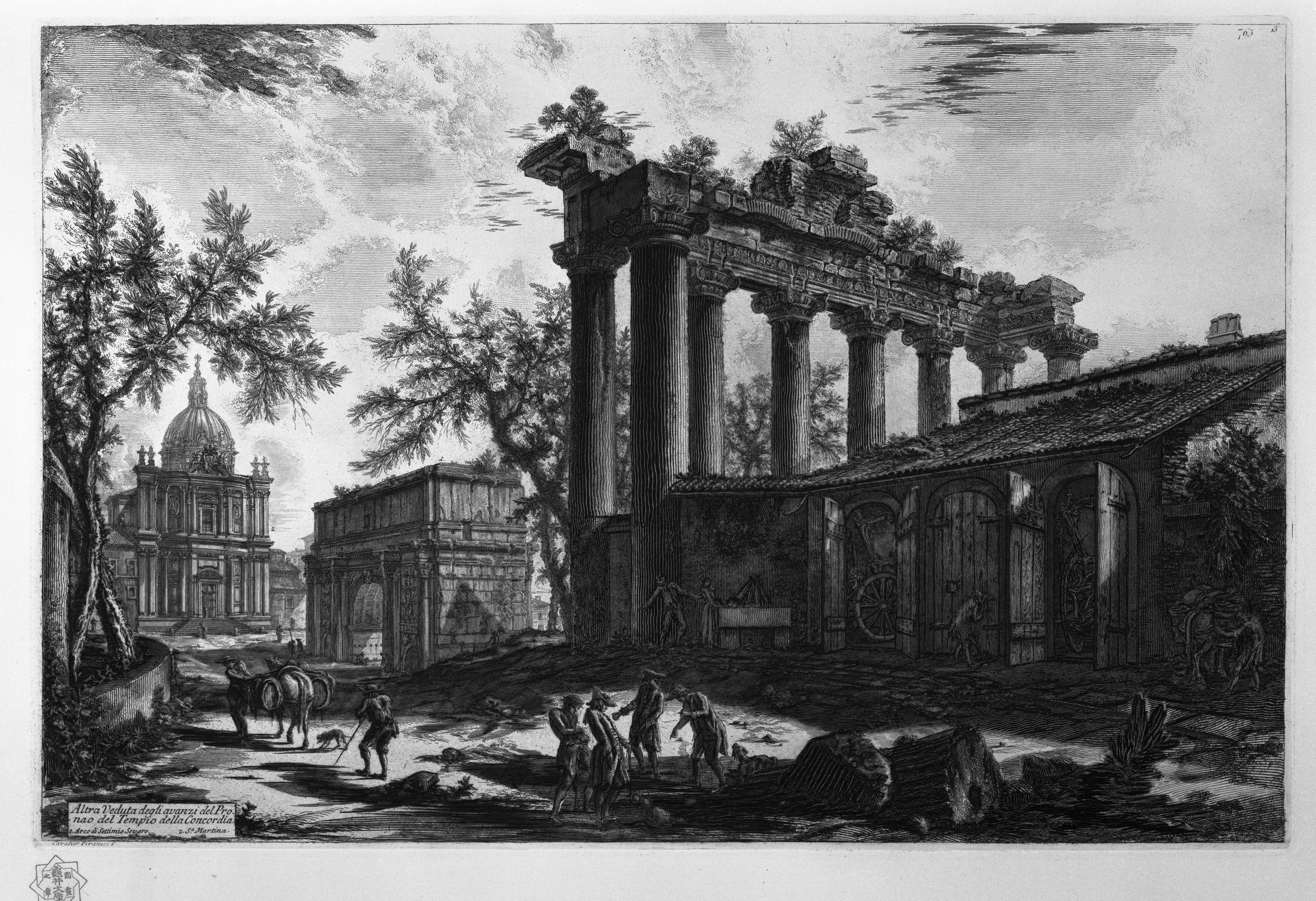
Giovanni Battista Piranesi. Temple of Saturn from the series Views of Rome, 1748-1774

According to art historian and popularizer of art Lev Dyakov, the figures depicted in the painting hold symbolic meaning. This view is shared by another researcher of the artist's work, Viktor Ignatiev, who noted that every action of the characters, every event, and every phenomenon in the painting carries symbolic significance. A bearded peasant with a broom and a young man in city clothes with a brush (Katkova saw him as a villager who had returned from working in the city and therefore dressed in an urban style) serve the same function, but in their own way. Their work symbolizes the "spiritual purification of life". The painting features many children with happy faces and toys in their hands. "An adult must be like a child to enter the Kingdom of God", Efim Chestnyakov himself wrote, drawing from the New Testament. (Note: Chestnyakov's words are based on a fragment from the Gospel of Matthew: "At that time the disciples came to Jesus and said, 'Who is greater in the kingdom of heaven?' Jesus called a child and set him in the midst of them and said, "Truly, I say to you, unless you turn and become like children, you will not enter the kingdom of heaven; therefore, whoever becomes as lowly as this child is greater in the kingdom of heaven" (Matthew XVIII, 1-4, Synodal translation).)

Shavarinsky also believed that many details of the artist's painting could be "read" symbolically (for example, the number of steps: four —an indication of the four corners of the world, twelve— the number, according to popular beliefs, that represents the fullness of life and harmony). In this painting, unlike others created by the artist, there are no "mythologized characters", but there is a large white dove (a symbol of peace and a good messenger) hovering over the arch in the upper left corner of the painting. Svetlana Katkova acknowledged the presence of symbolism but noted that, in the minutiae of everyday life, the artist does not deviate from the truth of life. When making a broom, the inhabitants of Shablovo cut two or three thin birch trees or long branches and tied them together. This is exactly the kind of broom depicted in the painting. A little boy licks his finger, "daintily eating something from a wooden trough or hollow tree". An old man is "drinking kvass or beer from a ladle, while the grandmother churns sour cream into butter in a pot". The girl eats, "holding it with both hands, afraid to drop even a crumb". The wooden two-story house with a wide balcony, like the city buildings, evokes manor architecture. The characters are dressed in festive, light-colored costumes, the children standing on the balcony wear fancy hats on their loose hair, and some families stroll down the street.

The Soviet and Russian literary scholar Valentin Kurbatov described the painting as "a huge dark canvas populated by a hundred characters and unprecedented architecture, as if it were translated into fairground village language from the pages of the mad Piranesi". He saw in the painting "a joyful assembly of wonders", "simple-minded exuberance, expressed only in the size of the pies", "cheerful wickedness", "old people dressed with prudent demise-seasonality — at least in summer, at least in winter", and "movement [which] is not directed anywhere, but as if frozen at the word of an invisible director for a commemorative photograph". The researcher concluded: "we stop in amazement in front of the widely branched human thought. Chestnyakov began and ended his world in Shablov. Here was the cradle, and here was, for him, the zenith of culture". He was convinced that by deciphering all the artist's papers, one could find out the name of each of the 120 old men, young men, and babies. At the same time, The City of Universal Welfare "concealed in its composition the artist's confusion before the dreamer's uncertain conception".

=== Time and space ===
Galina Neganova, in her PhD thesis, insisted that the narrative principle of the artistic picture of the world presented by Chestnyakov dates back to archaic culture and conveys a cyclical perception of time, one that has no length or direction. The City of Universal Welfare, in her opinion, represents the reality of the collective unconscious and reproduces the archetype of the city, although it is addressed to consciousness and associated with the future. Neganova argued that in Efim Chestnyakov's artistic world, beauty is linked to the holiday and correlates with the performance of festive rituals. During a holiday, ritual involves all its participants in the sacred sphere. The space-time of the holiday, in the artist's paintings and in his literary works, is associated with the "golden age", where harmony reigns and contradictions are eliminated.

The illustrator and journalist Zinaida Kurbatova suggested that the city depicted in the painting represents the universe covered by a crystal dome, through which the sun's rays pass. On the left, where Russian girls are shown at spinning wheels, Kurbatova interprets this as Russia, while on the right, the buildings exhibit both Western European and Eastern characteristics. Viktor Ignatiev and Evgeny Trofimov noted that the stone buildings placed in the upper part of the painting, on both the right and left, seem to extend beyond the canvas. The viewer gets the impression that the painting depicts only a part of the vast world lying outside its borders (a similar approach is used by the artist in the painting Festive Procession with Singing. Koliada). The girls' outfits in the painting are quite diverse, representing Ukrainian, Belarusian, and other nationalities. On the left, there is a building of an oriental type, which Katkova identifies as a mausoleum.

In the painting, there are no definitive indicators of time — neither the time of day nor the season of the year is discernible. There is no clear source of light; instead, a glow emanates from everywhere, defying the laws of physics, as it casts no shadows. One fragment of the painting, however, sharply contrasts with this: in the lower left corner, Chestnyakov depicts a dwelling in section. Inside, young people are illuminated by the light of a burning beam, while the night blue is visible outside the window. According to Ignatiev, this represents a "living past" that is integrated into the present (another element of this "living past", in his opinion, is the old huts squeezed between the stone buildings). Art historian Svetlana Katkova believed that the foreground of the painting is filled with elements connected to the past: the hut lit by a beam, the meetings with spinning wheels...

The artist incorporated principles of folklore art in his painting: the past coexists with the present, and in depicting a single plane, figures of different sizes are allowed (the same principle is evident in the painting The City of Universal Welfare, where an old man and an old woman are smaller than the boy and girl standing next to them). On the canvas, the categories of space and time are perceived as unified. According to Ignatiev, The City of Universal Welfare is not a genre painting, but a picture-tale: the action takes place outside of time, the scale of figures is distorted, and the plot is folkloric. The researcher attributes this to principles of folk culture, such as the cyclical nature of time and its eternity.

=== Reflection of the Stalin era ===
From the perspective of Svetlana Katkova, an employee of the Kostroma Museum-Reserve, the painting depicts a fantastic dream of universal happiness that has not been realized. Katkova suggested that the "destroyed and disfigured temples turned into prisons, a terrible black failure of the entrance under the arch, children at a strange dwelling in the form of an inverted pot or a haystack, a large wooden two-story house with identical loaves of bread..." seen on the canvas refer to the real present, which has already realized utopia in life. From her point of view, the painting "indirectly traces" the artist's response to events such as "dekulakization, hunger, arrests, and recruitment for construction sites", as well as the exsanguination of the village, deprived of its most active population.43 The painting also reflects Chestnyakov's personal struggles: worries over his arrested sister, orphaned nephews, and his sense of misunderstanding and loneliness. Katkova suggested that in the painting The City of Universal Welfare, the scene is actually set outside the fortress walls, with two solemn processions traveling from there. One procession carries material gifts —rolls, pies, a huge pretzel— while the second, set in the background, features less personified characters, with a large white dove flying towards them. In Christianity, the dove symbolizes the Holy Spirit. Katkova believes that behind the arch, according to the artist, lies the legendary Oponskoye Kingdom. She justifies this interpretation by noting the artist's close acquaintance with P. Y. Serov, a jeweler from the village of Krasnoye-na-Volge, who was an Old Believer wanderer.

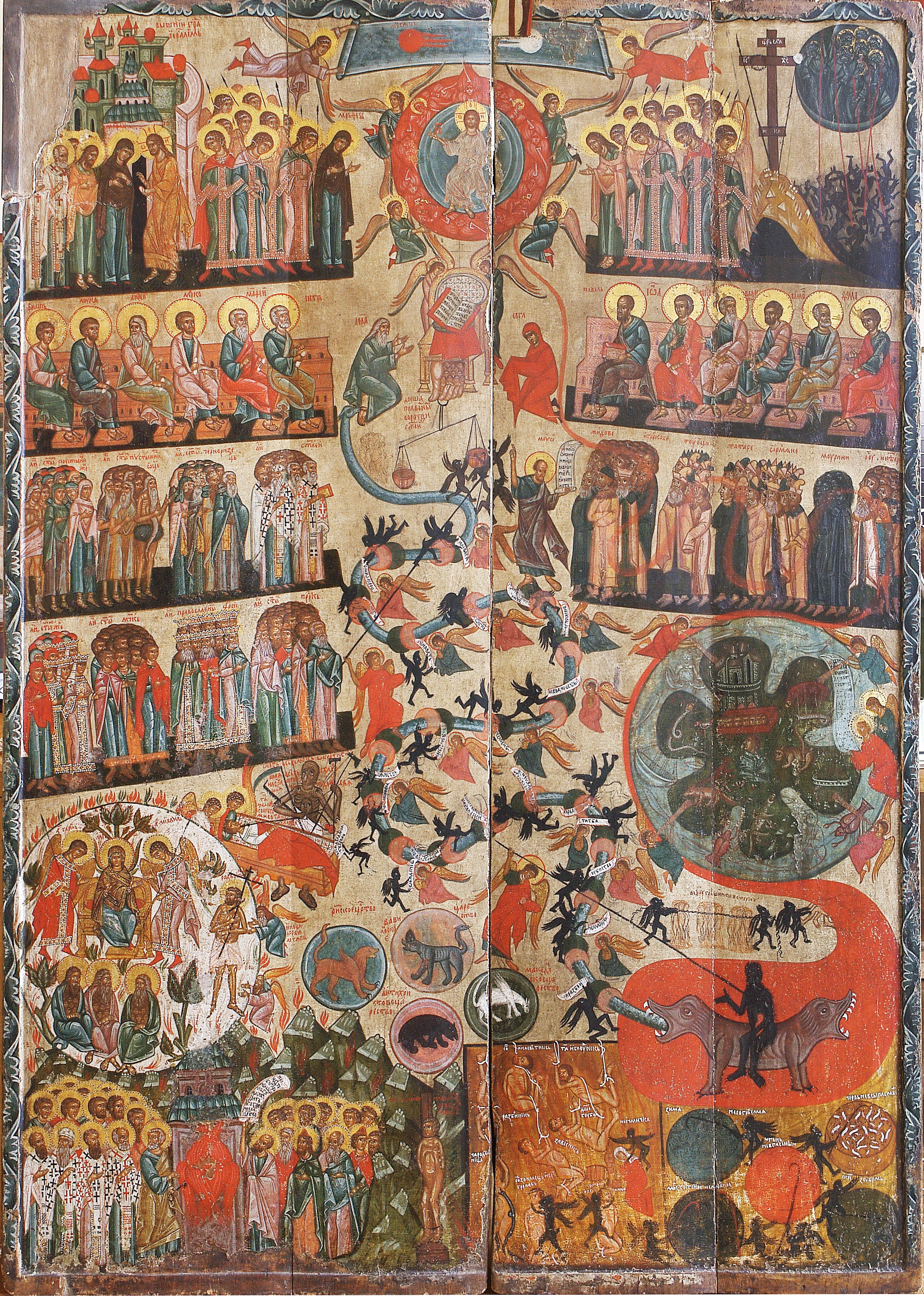
Icon of the Last Judgement of the 1560s from the village of Mshanets (Ukraine)

Katkova found echoes of the fresco The Last Judgement in the painting, noting its typical placement on the western wall of an Orthodox church. She pointed out the continuous filling of space with characters and architectural forms, the tiered structure, and the opposition between different groups of figures (the righteous and the sinners).

== Commercial use ==
In 2003, employees of the Kologriv Culture Department developed a three-day promotional tour titled From the Tsardom of Berendei to the City of Universal Welfare. The Tsardom of Tsar Berendei symbolized Kostroma, while the City of Universal Welfare represented Kologriv. The creators of the project explained that Chestnyakov was not only viewed as a prominent artist but also as "a locally honoured starets (saintly elder). The tour was organized by the Kostroma Museum of Art.27 One of the tour routes, called Efimov's Roads, includes visits to the village of Shablovo, where Chestnyakov's house-museum and ethnographic hut are located (with interactive programs offered), Efimov's Spring (whose water is believed to have healing properties), Mount Shabala, the "singing poplars", the Green Temple (a prayer place in the forest founded by Chestnyakov), Ileshevo village, and the Ilyinskaya and Nikolskaya churches of the 18-19th centuries, as well as Chestnyakov's grave. Dmitry Gromov and Anna Sokolova of the Institute of Ethnology and Anthropology of the Russian Academy of Sciences wrote that the "aggressive nature of promotion" of Chestnyakov's heritage caused some residents of Kologriv to feel "rejection rather than love".

== See other Chestnyakov's works ==
- Festive Procession with a Song. Kolyada

== Bibliography ==
=== Sources ===
- Chestnyakov, Е. V. (2011a). "Сказка о крылатых людях. КХМ КП-8089. Рукописная книга с рисунками No. 3. Лл. 127об. — 129". Русь уходящая в небо... Материалы из рукописных книг Е. В. Честнякова [Russia going to the sky... Materials from manuscript books of E. V. Chestnyakov] (in Russian). Кострома: Костромской государственный историко-архитектурный и художественный музей-заповедник. pp. 133–134.
- Chestnyakov, Е. V. (2011b). "Шаболовский тарантас. КП-8089. Рукописная книга с рисунками No. 3. Лл. 61об. — 67". Русь уходящая в небо... Материалы из рукописных книг Е. В. Честнякова [Russia going to the sky... Materials from manuscript books of E. V. Chestnyakov] (in Russian). Кострома: Костромской государственный историко-архитектурный и художественный музей-заповедник. pp. 118–120.

=== Researches and non-fiction ===
- Golovanov, V. Ya. (2017). Кологрив. Очерки глубинки [Kologriv. Sketches of the hinterland] (in Russian). Русский мир: Журнал. pp. 88–96.
- Golushkin, S. S. (1985). "Реставрация картин Ефима Честнякова". Ефим Честняков. Новые открытия советских реставраторовМ.: Советский художник, 1985. — С. 7—9 [Efim Chestnyakov. New discoveries of Soviet restorers] (in Russian). М.: Советский художник. pp. 7–9.
- Golushkina, L. A. (1986). "Сказ о крылатом человеке". Ямщиков С. В. [Yamshchikov S. В.. Saved beauty (stories about restoration of art monuments). A book for high school students] (in Russian). М.: Просвещение. pp. 149–177.
- Gromov D. V., Sokolova A. D. (2016). "Кологрив: два символа локальной идентичности". Динамика традиции в региональном измерении. Трансформационные процессы в культуре и языке Костромского края [Dynamics of tradition in the regional dimension. Transformation processes in the culture and language of the Kostroma region] (in Russian). М.: Институт этнологии и антропологии имени Н. Н. Миклухо-Маклая РАН: Сборник. pp. 102–132. ISBN 978-5-4211-0167-3.
- Diakov, L. A. (2014). "Страна обетованная Ефима Честнякова". Тайнопись искусства. Сборник статей [The mystery of art. Collection of articles]. Интересно о важном (in Russian). М.: «Новый Акрополь». pp. 251–258. ISBN 978-5-91896-046-2.
- Edoshina, E. A. (2013). "О чём свидетельствуют письма и черновики Ефима Честнякова (к проблеме отражения личности в тексте)". Музейный хронограф.: Сборник статей и материалов. Костромской государственный историко-архитектурный и художественный музей-заповедник [Museum Chronograph: Collection of articles and materials. Kostroma State Historical-Architectural and Art Museum-Reserve] (in Russian). Vol. 4. pp. 20–32.
- Ignatiev, V. Ya. (1995). "IV. Шаблово. Кологривский Пролеткульт. Шабловский детский сад. Первые выставки. Последние годы жизни. 1917—1961". Ефим Васильевич Честняков [Efim Vasilievich Chestnyakov] (in Russian). Кострома: Теза. p. 128.
- Ignatiev V. Ya., Trofimov E. P. (1988). Мир Ефима Честнякова [Efim Chestnyakov's World] (in Russian). М.: Молодая гвардия. p. 221. ISBN 5-235-00090-0.
- Ignatiev, V. Ya. (1977). "Ефим Васильевич Честняков". Ефим Честняков. Художник сказочных чудес. Каталог выставки [Efim Chestnyakov. Artist of fairy-tale miracles. Exhibition catalog] (in Russian). М.: Советский художник. pp. 7–16.
- Каталог. Живопись. Графика. Скульптура // Ефим Честняков. Художник сказочных чудес. Каталог выставки [Catalog. Painting. Graphics. Sculpture // Efim Chestnyakov. Artist of fairy-tale miracles. Exhibition catalog] (in Russian). М.: Советский художник. 1977. pp. 18–28.
- Katkova, S. S. (2009). "«Город Всеобщего Благоденствия»". Вестник Костромского государственного университета им. Н. А. Некрасова. Серия «Гуманитарные науки» [Bulletin of N. A. Nekrasov Kostroma State University. Series "Humanities"] (in Russian). Vol. 15. Энтелехия: Журнал. pp. 102–112.
- Kurbatov, V. Ya. (1986). "Откровение Ефима Честнякова". Ямщиков С. В.. Спасённая красота (рассказы о реставрации памятников искусства) [Yamshchikov S. В.. Saved beauty (stories about restoration of art monuments)] (in Russian). М.: Просвещение. p. 192.
- Kurbatova, Z. Yu. (2019). Русская душа Ефима Честнякова [The Russian soul of Efim Chestnyakov] (in Russian). Русский мир: Журнал. pp. 48–53.
- Neganova, G. D. (2007). Феномен красоты в духовном наследии Е. Честнякова. Автореферат диссертации на соискание учёной степени кандидата культурологии [The phenomenon of beauty in the spiritual heritage of E. Chestnyakov. Chestnyakov. Abstract of the thesis for the degree of Candidate of Cultural Studies] (in Russian). Ярославль: Костромской государственный университет им. Н. А. Некрасова. p. 20.
- Obukhov, R. E. (2008). "Как феникс из пепла (К истории возрождения творческого наследия Е. В. Честнякова)". Пути в избах. Трикнижие о шабловском проповеднике, художнике Ефиме Честнякове [Paths in the dwellings. Trickbook about the Shablovsk preacher, artist Efim Chestnyakov] (in Russian). М.: Международный Центр Рерихов. Полиграф — Эра. pp. 23–57.
- Sukhareva, T. P. (2011). "Рукописи Ефима Честнякова – источник духовной и народной мудрости". Русь уходящая в небо...Материалы из рукописных книг Е. В. Честнякова [Russia going to the sky...Materials from manuscript books E. V. Chestnyakov. V. Chestnyakova] (in Russian). Кострома: Костромской государственный историко-архитектурный и художественный музей-заповедник. pp. 3–13.
- Tyurin, Yu. P. (1978). Окружённый хором муз [Surrounded by a chorus of muses] (in Russian). Огонёк: Журнал. p. 233.
- "Честняков Ефим Васильевич (1874—1961)". Любительское художественное творчество в России XX века. Словарь. Редактор Суханова Т. А. [Amateur Artistic Creativity in Russia of the 20th Century. Dictionary. Editor Sukhanova T. A.] (in Russian). М.: Прогресс-Традиция. 2010. pp. 465–467. ISBN 978-5-89826-334-8.
- Честняков Ефим Васильевич: Живопись. Графика: Каталог выставки / Музей зарубежного искусства Латвийской ССР, июль — август 1983 г. [Efim Vasilyevich Chestnyakov: Painting. Graphics: Exhibition catalog / Museum of Foreign Art of the Latvian SSR, July - August 1983] (in Russian). Рига. 1983. p. 18.
- Shavarinsky, I. S. (2016). Театр Ефима Честнякова как феномен культуры: к проблеме синтетической природы творчества и его рецепции. Диссертация на соискание учёной степени кандидата культурологии [Efim Chestnyakov's theater as a cultural phenomenon: to the problem of synthetic nature of creativity and its reception. Dissertation for the degree of Candidate of Cultural Studies] (in Russian). Иваново: Костромской государственный университет имени Н. А. Некрасова, Ивановский государственный университет. p. 230.
- Shalygin, A. (1987). Ефим Честняков и дети [Yefim Chestnyakov and children] (in Russian). Северная правда: Газета.
