= Festive Procession with a Song. Kolyada =

Painting by Russian artist Efim Chestnyakov

- Artist: Efim Chestnyakov
- Year: After 1917
- Type: Oil on canvas
- Dimensions: 96 cm × 213 cm (38 in × 84 in)
- Location: Kostroma State Historical, Architectural and Art Museum-Reserve, Kostroma

Festive Procession with a Song. Kolyada (Russian: Праздничное шествие с песней. Коляда; usually called Kolyada) is a painting by Russian and Soviet artist Efim Chestnyakov. It is one of the artist's most significant and famous works, and some art historians date it to the period immediately after the October Revolution of 1917. It shows an ancient Slavic custom called koledari. Some researchers think that the painting is connected to Chestnyakov's work with teenagers. This was part of a programme called Universal Culture that he created. The artist was involved in many different ways in the theatre, including writing the script, directing, composing music and performing. The audience, who were villagers, also took part in the show. These researchers suggested that the painting does not show the ritual itself, but a play based on it, created, set up and designed by Chestnyakov.

The painting is in the Kostroma State Historical-Architectural and Art Museum-Reserve. Nowadays, it forms a part of the Romanov Museum on the My Forgotten, Native Past... exhibition, which is all about the work of Efim Vasilievich Chestnyakov. The painting is called Festive Procession with a Song. The painting was in a really bad state when it arrived at the museum, but the staff at the All-Russian Art Research and Restoration Center named after I. E. Grabar fixed it up.

Soviet journalist Larisa Golushkina wrote about local history and art. She described the painting Festive Procession with a Song. Kolyada as the most poetic in the artist's work. The painting was shown at many exhibitions in Russia and other countries.

== History ==
=== Date and title ===
The painting Kolyada is not signed or dated by the artist, which is typical for most of Efim Chestniakov's works. (Note: Rare exceptions include the early 1894 Portrait of a Girl in a Pink Dress and The Grouse King, which the artist titled himself.) The 1983 exhibition of paintings and graphics by Efim Chestnyakov in Riga carefully noted which works were by the artist, including Holiday Procession with a Song. Kolyada. It is thought that Kolyada was probably painted in the 1910s-1930s. Most people think that by the late 1930s, Chestnyakov had stopped painting and started working with children and writing books instead.

In his book about the artist's work, the director of the Kostroma State Art Museum, Victor Ignatiev, said that the painting Kolyada was made just after the October Revolution of 1917. The cultural life of Kologriv was very active at this time. In 1918, the Museum of the Palace of Proletarian Culture opened, and he worked in an art studio. He also gave lectures on the history of art and published the first issue of the magazine Zhizn Iskusstva. At this time, Chestnyakov was an active participant in public and artistic life: from 1918 to 1920, he was a member of the Kostroma Scientific Society for the study of the local region; from November 1919, he began to participate in the work of the Palace of Proletkult; he taught in his art studio and organised a theatre studio; in Shablovo, he created the Children's Garden, where children were engaged in artistic creativity; he worked in it as director, teacher and educator; and he became the people's assessor of the volost court and performed his duties until 1925. At the same time, Victor Ignatyev said that the most important painting of the artist was the City of Universal Welfare, and that the small paintings Two at the hut, Girl playing svirel, Young man and girl at the stream, Date, Peasant children and White seamstress. According to Ignatiev, there are some common features for the paintings of this period. These include the reflection of life based on the principles of folk art, using the method of "idealizing typification of reality". This combines innovation and realism. It is particularly important that the paintings have a logical way of arranging the space, stable shapes, a very good way of showing light, repetition as a way of making the work, and an attempt to show the internal regularity and organisation of the world.

=== Final destination ===
After the painting was created, it was at the artist's home in the village of Shablovo (since 1930, he no longer exhibited or sold his paintings), where he had a whole series of small paintings, which Chestnyakov called Kolyadki. In 2015, a teacher from the Kologriva secondary school told the staff of the Kostroma Museum-Reserve about these very works when she visited Chestnyakov:

"Well, here are the paintings. There's a passageway further in, into another room. There were some small pictures on the wall. This is about a quarter of the size of the tablecloth (it's on the table). That's about the size of the tablecloth. All the paintings are close together. The artist said to me: "This is Kolyadki! Have you ever heard of them?" I've heard of kolyadki, but I don't know what they represent (whispering). I said: "I've heard that there are koledari! But I've never seen one!" "Well, look!" — shows me".

The image of the kolyadki ritual is also present in one of the artist's literary works, in the story A Stream.

After Efim Chestnyakov died in 1961, the local arts council refused to accept his paintings, sculptures and manuscripts for storage in the museum. They thought his paintings and sculptures were too simple and not important enough to be put in a museum. They stayed in the artist's empty house in Shablov for some time. The paintings and sculptures were taken away by village children and then by their parents. Some villagers thought Efim Chestnyakov was a saint and a visionary, and that his things could heal people from illnesses. Some villagers had his paintings on display in the corner next to their icons, while others kept them in the attic.

The restorer Sergei Golushkin later wrote about the condition of the painting Festive Procession with a Song. Kolyada after it was bought by the museum: He said that the thin canvas had been torn because of the thick paint layer. E. Chestnyakov sewed them back together with strong threads along the edge, following the painting's design, and to hide the seams, he painted over them. He also glued pieces of cloth and oilcloth to the back of the painting. (Note: On the illustration published in the book Efim Chestnyakov. New discoveries of Soviet restorers. Compiled by. Yamshchikov S. В. Moscow: Soviet Artist, 1985. pp. 7-9.) The restorers had to make a new canvas to copy the old one, and then stretch it on a stretcher. During the restoration of Kolyada, natural materials like fish glue and wax-caniniferous mastic were used to treat the front and back sides of the painting. Galushkin noted that the restoration made the staff of the Grabar All-Russian Art Research and Restoration Center happy, both in terms of their work and how it looked.

When asked about how complicated the restoration was, Golushkin said that Festive Procession with Song was the hardest. Kolyada was the most difficult one. It was painted on the thinnest type of canvas, which, surprisingly, needs to be thicker. The painting had no stretcher, so the canvas shrank and formed creases. These creases got into the paint layer, making it stiff and difficult to see. These processes started while the artist was still alive and had already got quite far by the time the restoration work began. There were also general problems with the artist's paintings: he often transported them, there were losses of the author's paint layer, soot and dust had penetrated into the paint, and the peasants who became owners of the artist's paintings after his death unsuccessfully tried to renew them.

=== Preparatory works for the painting's exhibition at the Romanov Museum ===
There is a festive procession with a song. Kolyada is an oil painting on canvas. It measures 96 by 213 cm. The painting is part of the Kostroma State Historical, Architectural and Art Museum-Reserve collection (inventory number KMZ KP-2719). You can see it now in the Romanov Museum on the My Forgotten, Native... exhibition, which is all about the paintings of Efim Vasilievich Chestnyakov. The painting has been shown at many exhibitions in Russia and other countries. For example, it was listed under number 39 in the catalogue of the artist's personal exhibition in 1977 in Moscow (Exhibition Hall in Kadashah Sloboda) and Kostroma (Museum of Fine Arts). It is also mentioned in the catalogue of Chestnyakov's personal exhibition, published in 1983 in Riga. In November 2005 to January 2006, it was shown at an exhibition in Kazan (State Museum of Fine Arts of the Republic of Tatarstan).

In his dissertation, Igor Shavarinsky, a candidate in cultural studies, mentions a sketch for the painting Kolyada. This painting is also in the Kostroma Museum-Reserve collection (KMZ / KHM KP-6377). It shows the image of the Grouse King, which is not in the final version of the painting Kolyada, but it became the main image in another painting by the artist — The Grouse King (oil painting on canvas, 71.5 × 85.5 cm, restorer E. Malyagina, KMZ KP without number). Catalogs of exhibitions of the artist in 1977 and 1983 mention two more sketches for the painting Kolyada, which were shown at their exhibition: Guests (paper, watercolour, 36 × 55 cm, KMZ KP-502) and Glorying (paper, watercolour, 36 × 45 cm, KMZ KP-501). Sergei Golushkin said that, unlike many artists who make changes in the final version of the image on the canvas, overlaying one colorful layer on another, Chestnyakov made a large number of preliminary studies and sketches and only then began work on the painting.

Ignatyev and Trofimov said that the artist's notebooks often have sketches of the painting Kolyada. The authors of that book say that this shows that "Chestnyakov always had the main and important idea in his mind, which he wanted to express as accurately as possible in his art".

== Representation and artistic characteristics ==
The story of the picture is set on 18 August, the day of the martyrs Florus and Laurus. On this day in the Russian village, people sang koledari. The people taking part in the ritual dressed up as a goat, a horse, a cow, and a bear. They went around the village singing songs and wishing their fellow villagers good harvests, wealth and children. They also asked for people to follow the traditions. The villagers gave them gifts in exchange for the songs.

In the front of the painting, we see the people who are singing koledari. They are singing Kolyada's praises and wishing their hosts well. In the middle of the picture, there is a boy with a squeezebox and a girl with a sunflower (Katkova thinks the girl is Kolyada). On the right, next to her, there are two more friends: a boy with a harmonica and a boy playing a rih. On the left of the main character is a rynda with a special tool called a bardiche (Note: S. S. Katkova in her article mistakenly calls not the bodyguard , but a weapon, which he holds in his hands.) and wearing a hat that looks like a helmet. However, like the other participants in the ritual, he is depicted barefoot and his clothes are in patches. O. N. Rumyantseva, a senior researcher at the Kostroma Museum-Reserve, believes that the flower in the girl's hands is a symbol of the sun. The villagers gathered to help the sun during a difficult time. To fight evil forces in the foreground, Rumyantseva believes a marketplace with a weapon in its hands is depicted. Even farther away is an old man with a staff and a basket filled with gifts. S. S. Katkova says that the guardian is protecting the gifts carried by the old man. (Note: One of Chestnyakov's fellow villagers told of Chestnyakov's own carol singing (his story coincides with the image in the painting Kolyada): "I was still a little girl... I... was about 8-10 years old... And so, during the holidays, he visited our village... he had acquaintances... It was on the day of Uspleniev... he took me and two others... to the Zaitsevs' house... and hurt us: he put on masks... he gave me a sunflower... there was an axe... he made it... we held it in our hands... there was something else, like a cold weapon from the old days... a model... He had an accordion... hexagonal... small - small... he made it himself.... And so we began to go to the houses... and one citizen... he was from Zelenin... Gavrila Kudryavtsev ... we came to the windows ... and out of the windows children looked out ... and sang Kolyada ... And he, knowing that shto here lives Gavrila, he sang, playing harmonica ... on his hand bells ... ")

The people taking part in the ritual in the front are the main focus of the other villagers – both children and adults. Svetlana Katkova said that this part of the picture is a natural image. In the background, on the right of the picture, women can be seen, and further back, men. To the left, there's a family portrait in the window of the hut: a father, a mother, their son and their daughter. A girl leans on the window sill and puts her head on her left hand, looking up at the koledari with a dreamy expression. The boy rests his chin on his knuckles and looks down with curiosity. You can also see the parents' faces above them. Under the window, there is a group of children of different ages watching the koledari. Towards the centre of the scene, a high porch is visible, where a mother and daughter lean on the parapet. To their right, a boy sucks his thumb and to their left, another boy stands in full height on the same parapet. Behind them, the adults can be seen. The artist wrote the words of the koledari on the woodwork of the hut.

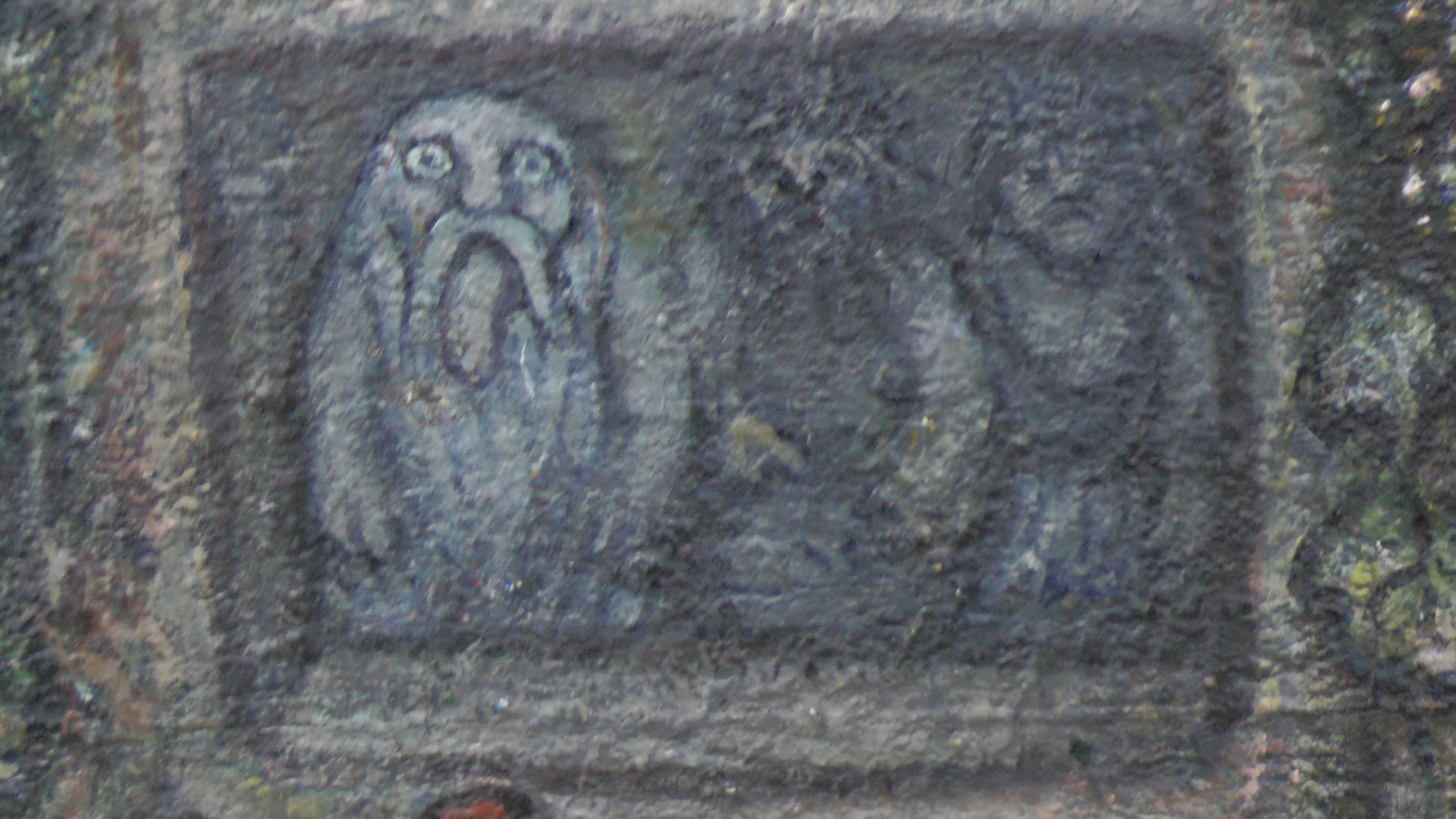
The vivid spirits on the painting Kolyada.

A boy and a girl run from the alley. On the right side of the picture is a rich courtyard with a big stone house and columns along the front. The building is divided into three vertical rows of images, with three images in each row. In the top horizontal row there are three waist-up portraits: Dorofei Ivanovich, his wife Daria Trifonovna and their five children. All of them are sitting at the window with their hands on the sill; the curtains, like a stage curtain, serve as a backdrop for the characters. In front of the people in the windows, there are bowls of berries. Below the father's portrait is a picture of three tall stacks, next to it is a picture of a sheep ready to be dried before being threshed, and there is a river with boats in it. The lower picture in this vertical row is covered by an apple tree with ripe red apples, around which doves fly. Under the portrait of Daria Timofeyevna is a picture of young Dorofey trying to impress her. Daria is shown as a young girl with a spinning wheel on a hut, and next to her is her future husband, a teenager. There are two roads leading to the hut, and a goat is approaching a goat lying in the meadow (which is the same as the courting scene). Even lower down, in the window, we can see the figures of domovykh: "Grandfather-domovedushko, neighbour-domovedushko, kikimora (?)". According to Katkova, these are "spirits that protect the house and its inhabitants". (Note: On vivid spirits is described in detail in the corresponding chapter of the book Afanasyev A. N.. N. Zhitnye spirits // Poetic views of the Slavs on nature. M.: K. Soldatyonkov Publishing House, 1869. V. 3. pp. 771-776.) However, if the owners of the house do not take care of them, they steal their property. In Victor Ignatyev's interpretation, based on the artist's memories of his childhood, the vivid spirits are the neighbour, the kikimora. The neighbour and the kikimora lives under the stairs, and the lizun lives behind the kvassnitsa, in the chimney and in the ovine. According to Ignatyev and Trofimov, the lizun and kikimora are introduced into the plot of Kolyada not because of its folklore beginning.

The picture below the group portrait of the children shows them in summer in a meadow on the way down from the mountain. The children are playing games like pipers, whistles, and whistles, and only one of them is dancing. At the bottom of the picture, the head of a white goat, which was a symbol of fertility, sticks out of a small stable window. Under the house, it says, "The hens walk, the cockerel sings". There are twelve chickens around them.

=== Composition ===
Svetlana Katkova said that the artist usually included writing in his paintings, like in old Russian folk luboks. In some paintings, like Our Festival and Svakhonka kind..., the inscription is like an extra part of the painting. But in Kolyada, the inscription takes up half the canvas. Katkova compared this use of text with the techniques of avant-garde artists of the early 20th century, who pasted labels and newspaper headlines on the canvas, included texts in the very pictorial texture of paintings.

Ignatiev had a different opinion about the role of the inscription on the painting. He thought that the inscription helps the viewer to understand the meaning of the painting and explains some of its artistic images. Ignatyev also said that the words and pictures on the painting are very similar. So, over the image of Dorofey Timofeyevich there really is "a clear month", and over the five children looking out of the window there are "clear stars".

Soviet art expert Ignatyev said that there are three parts to the painting Kolyada. On the left, there are images of a village hut. On the right, there is a picture with a three-tiered white-stone building in the middle. In the middle of the picture is a crowd of peasants "pouring" into the village square. Ignatyev noticed that the artist chose to paint the scene from a certain height, which was not visible to the viewers from above or in front of the square. This lets him include as much space as possible – not only the peasants who have come to the square, but also the boy and girl who are running down the alley behind it. Chestnyakov also used a technique similar to one seen in another of his paintings, The City of Universal Welfare. In this technique, he only shows part of an object (for example, a village hut), and the viewer can imagine the rest.

Larisa Golushkina said that the painting has two parts. She thought that one part shows the tradition of singing Christmas songs, and the other part shows peasants working and resting. She also thought that the images of festivity and abundance on the painting were the wishes of the children to their fellow villagers.

=== Colour solution ===
Svetlana Katkova pointed out that in this painting, the artist's outline follows the contours of the face and highlights the nose, eyes, shirt and scarf. However, it does not dominate the composition, and is not the focus. The outline is only a shadow that shows the shape of the character's body.

Victor Ignatyev noticed that the colours in the painting all match each other. The colours do not clash, there is no dominant colour, and the highlights are soft. The artist deliberately made each colour spot stand out on its own, which is different from most plein air paintings. Chestnyakov has drawn around each spot with a dark line, which makes them look separate from each other. But the spots of colour are still part of the overall colour composition of the painting. The main colour is emerald green. This creates a calm and solemn mood, which the Soviet art critic compared to the performance of a polyphonic Russian folk song on a warm summer evening.

== Soviet and Russian art historians opinions ==
Russian art expert Svetlana Katkova sorted all of Chestnyakov's paintings into two large groups. She says that the paintings in the first group are based on traditional customs and rituals of Kostroma province. The paintings in the second group are based on fairy tales that the artist himself invented. The stories in the second group are set in the artist's home village. Both groups of paintings usually show some kind of play that the artist put on with village children. However, Katkova believed that in the painting Kolyada, E. Chestnyakov depicted "how children, in the theatrical action representing the ritual, learn the culture of the people, and the artist, in addition, through symbolism, familiarizes them with the idea of Family as the core value of Life". The Sun is glorified in the painting, and Katkova says it is dedicated to the relationship between the Sun and the Family, which provide people with peace and well-being. Chestnyakov never had his own family and he thought this idea (love, choosing a wife, wedding ceremony, family unity) was very important. He wrote and painted about it many times.

According to Katkova, the painting does not show the ritual itself, but rather, it depicts its performance on stage. This performance was part of the artist's work with teenagers on a programme called Universal Culture, which he developed. (Note: Vyacheslav Sapogov, candidate of philological sciences, agreed with this point of view, claiming that all Chestnyakov's paintings depict theatricalized performances based on the synthesis of arts - so-called “actions”.) The programme's main focus was on children's theatre: "He was the scriptwriter, director, composer and musician, and also performed many roles in a show where the audience and the actors were all united". The old man in the foreground has a clearly false beard and is part of the actor's props; his hands and feet belong to a child and are not the same size as an adult's. They are also distinguished by staging that is typical of children. Svetlana Katkova says that the sunflowers, flowers and tree are made of paper and are brightly coloured. They come from the props that the artist uses at festivals.

In the picture, Katkova saw the director of the performance, Efim Chestnyakov, who was in the first row on the right. He was wearing a city suit, a tie, a city cap, and he did not have a beard. However, Katkova says that I. A. Serov, who was close to the artist, said that Chestnyakov never painted himself in his own paintings. (Note: A fellow villager later told the authors of a monograph on the artist's work that Efim Chestnyakov himself dressed up as Kolyada during the procession. At their request to show how he portrayed her, “wearing on her head a wreath of paper flowers (”It should be real!“) with bright ribbons, a new apron, shoes woven from birch bark ‘steps’, also decorated with ribbons, she took out an old talianka, on which, according to her words, ‘played Fimushko’, and, going out on the lawn in front of the house, sang.)

Katkova believed: Chestnyakov realised that the old traditions of Kostroma were being forgotten because of new life there, and he decided to paint them. The artist himself took part in village festivals, asked village elders to tell him about the rituals, and then he and the children performed a ritual play in front of the adults.

Viktor Ignatiev wrote that the painting shows what Chestnyakov's art is all about. He thinks the painting shows the traditional practice of singing around a village in the spring, when people are hoping for new life. These songs include wishes for good fortune for the generous and predictions of disaster for the miserly. Ignatyev believed that the painting used several of the main ideas that we see in Chestnyakov's work. In the centre of the painting, there is a young man with a accordion, who looks like a character in the painting Our Festival. There is also a girl with a sunflower, who looks like a character from the painting Wedding. And there is a boy with a piper, who looks like the character from Our Festival. The art expert also found characters from the paintings Women and Children, Listening to the gusli, and Festive Procession. Peace.

Igor Shavarinsky, quoting researchers of the artist's work, wrote that in the painting Chestnyakov "could have depicted an episode from his work with children on the Universal Culture programme. Yefim usually played the harmonica, and the children, who were unusually dressed, played clay whistles and pipers, beat tambourines and rang bells. Years later, Nina Rumyantseva, who had been a pupil of Chestnyakov's, recalled that the children loved koledariling with the artist. One girl was dressed as Sunny, with a colourful wide skirt and a crown on her head. The artist gave the children musical instruments and played the psaltery, bells or harmonica. The children went around the yards singing and dancing. Shavarinsky himself thought that the canvas, because it was so big, could be used as a backdrop for the theatre shows that he put on. He thought that this canvas was similar to the painting Our Festival.

Dr. K. G. Bohemskaya, a Doctor of Art History, wrote a short biography of Chestnyakov in the book Amateur Artistic Creativity in Russia of the 20th century. In it, she writes that the artist in the painting Kolyada retells folklore stories. She also writes about how Chestnyakov set up a children's theatre studio, but doesn't connect these two things.

== Kolyada in fiction ==
In the book The Miraculous Apple by the Soviet and Russian children's writer Lev Kuzmin, in Chapter VII, Efim Chestnyakov first shows his fellow villagers his new painting Festive Procession with Song. Kolyada during his next "festival": "Efim took the canvas off the cart and put the painting on it – it was bright, colourful and had just been painted. He had kept it secret and had not told anyone about it". Local children join in the performance that the artist has organised. They play on clay whistles, wearing "paper masks with beards made of sliver, all kinds of hats and caps. Chestnyakov reads koledari verses to the audience, which are written on the painting. The villagers approach the painting and, when they begin to look at it, they see the image of their own children and the artist himself: "But this is my Manyushka with a sunflower is drawn ... And this one, with a harmonica, is my Grishutka... And this is Efim Vasilievich himself! He is also depicted holding a harmonica, directing the entire choir.

In his novel Efimov cordon (about the life and work of Chestnyakov), published in 1978 in the Moscow publishing house Sovremennik, Soviet poet, writer and later Orthodox priest Vyacheslav Shaposhnikov describes the "extraordinary affection" of Efim Chestnyakov for children and mentions his improvised performances on village streets, including "kolyada", in which the "ryazhenya children" took an active part.

== Bibliography ==
=== Sources ===
- Chestnyakov, E. V. (1988). Ручеёк [A stream] (in Russian). М.: Молодая гвардия. pp. 182–193. ISBN 5-235-00090-0.
- "Экспедиционные записи о Е. В. Честнякове. Кологривский р-н Костромской обл., 2015 г. (зап. и опубл. Е. А. Самоделовой)". Динамика традиции в региональном измерении. Трансформационные процессы в культуре и языке Костромского края [Dynamics of tradition in the regional dimension. Transformation processes in the culture and language of the Kostroma region] (in Russian). М.: Институт этнологии и антропологии имени Н. Н. Миклухо-Маклая РАН: Сборник. 2016. pp. 408–423. ISBN 978-5-4211-0167-3.
- Экспедиционные записи о Ефиме Честнякове. Запись и публикация Назаровой А. Г. [Expeditionary records about Efim Chestnyakov. Recorded and published by Nazarova A. G.] (in Russian). Русская земля: Журнал. 2019.

=== Researches and non-fiction ===
- Bogemskaya, К. G. (2010). Честняков Ефим Васильевич (1874—1961) // Любительское художественное творчество в России XX века. Словарь [Efim Vasilyevich Chestnyakov (1874-1961) // Amateur Artistic Creativity in Russia in the 20th Century. Dictionary] (in Russian). М.: Прогресс-Традиция. pp. 465–467. ISBN 978-5-89826-334-8.
- Golovanov, V. Ya. (2017). Кологрив. Очерки глубинки [Kologriv. Sketches of the hinterland] (in Russian). Русский мир: Журнал. pp. 88–96.
- Golushkin, S. S. (1985). Реставрация картин Ефима Честнякова // Ефим Честняков. Новые открытия советских реставраторов [Restoration of paintings by Efim Chestnyakov // Efim Chestnyakov. New discoveries of Soviet restorers] (in Russian). М.: Советский художник. pp. 7–9.
- Golushkina, L. A. (1986). Сказ о крылатом человеке // С. В. Ямщиков. Спасённая красота (рассказы о реставрации памятников искусства). Книга для учащихся старших классов [Tale of the Winged Man // S. V. Yamshchikov. Saved Beauty (stories about the restoration of art monuments). A book for high school students] (in Russian). М.: Просвещение. pp. 149–177.
- Ignatyev, V. Ya. (1977). Ефим Васильевич Честняков // Ефим Честняков. Художник сказочных чудес. Каталог выставки [Efim Vasilyevich Chestnyakov // Efim Chestnyakov. Artist of fairy-tale miracles. Exhibition catalog] (in Russian). М.: Советский художник. pp. 7–16.
- Ignatyev, V. Ya. (1995). "IV. Шаблово. Кологривский Пролеткульт. Шабловский детский сад. Первые выставки. Последние годы жизни. 1917—1961". Ефим Васильевич Честняков [Efim Vasilievich Chestnyakov] (in Russian). Кострома: Теза. pp. 59–74.
- Ignatyev V. Ya., Trofimov E. P. (1988). Мир Ефима Честнякова [Efim Chestnyakov's world] (in Russian). М.: Молодая гвардия. p. 221. ISBN 5-235-00090-0.
- Katkova, S. S. (2016). Е. В. Честняков. Особенности стиля живописи // Века и судьбы. – Костромской музей-заповедник [Е. V. Chestnyakov. Features of the style of painting // Centuries and Fates. - Kostroma Museum-Reserve] (PDF) (in Russian). Vol. 2. Кострома: Костромаиздат. pp. 276–298. ISBN 978-5-98295-091-8.
- Katkova, S. S. (2013). Е. В. Честняков. Символика в картине Е. В. Честнякова «Коляда» // Века и судьбы. – Костромской музей-заповедник [Е. V. Chestnyakov. Symbolism in the painting E. V. Chestnyakov “Kolyada” // Centuries and Fates. V. Chestnyakov “Kolyada” // Centuries and Fates. - Kostroma Museum-Reserve] (in Russian). Vol. 2. Кострома: Костромаиздат. pp. 253–263. ISBN 978-5-98295-091-8.
- Kurbatova, Z. Yu. (2019). Русская душа Ефима Честнякова [Russian soul of Efim Chestyakov] (in Russian). Русский мир: Журнал. pp. 48–53.
- Obukhov, R. E. (2008). Как феникс из пепла (К истории возрождения творческого наследия Е. В. Честнякова) // Пути в избах. Трикнижие о шабловском проповеднике, художнике Ефиме Честнякове [Like a phoenix from the ashes (To the history of revival of E. V. Chestnyakov's creative heritage) // Paths in the izbahs. Trickbook about the Shablov preacher, artist Efim Chestnyakov] (in Russian). М.: Международный Центр Рерихов. Полиграф — Эра. pp. 23–57.
- Rumyantseva, O. N. (2007). Образ солнца в народнопоэтической традиции (на примере праздника «Коляда» и картины Е. Честнякова «Коляда») // Из истории культуры Костромского края [The image of the sun in the folk-poetic tradition (on the example of the holiday “Kolyada” and the E. Chestnyakov's painting) // From the history of culture of the Kostroma region] (in Russian). Кострома: КГУ. pp. 96–98. ISBN 978-5-7591-0866-5.
- Sapogov, V. A. (1988). "Окружённый хором муз…" [“Surrounded by a chorus of muses...”] (in Russian). М.: Молодая гвардия. pp. 213–220. ISBN 5-235-00090-0.
- Честняков Ефим Васильевич: Живопись. Графика: Каталог выставки / Музей зарубежного искусства Латвийской ССР, июль — август 1983 г. [Efim Vasilyevich Chestnyakov: Painting. Graphics: Exhibition catalog / Museum of Foreign Art of the Latvian SSR, July - August 1983.] (in Russian). Рига. 1983. p. 18.
- Shavarinsky, I. S. (2014). "Представления о личности и творчестве Ефима Честнякова в контексте исследований конца XX — начала XXI веков" [Representations about the personality and creativity of Efim Chestnyakov in the context of research of the late XX - early XXI centuries]. Вестник Костромского Государственного Университета (in Russian). 20 (7). Вестник Костромского государственного университета имени H. A. Некрасова: Журнал: 269–272.
- Shavarinsky, I. S. (2016). Театр Ефима Честнякова как феномен культуры: к проблеме синтетической природы творчества и его рецепции. Диссертация на соискание учёной степени кандидата культурологии [Efim Chestnyakov's theater as a cultural phenomenon: to the problem of synthetic nature of creativity and its reception. Dissertation for the degree of Candidate of Cultural Studies] (in Russian). Иваново: Костромской государственный университет имени Н. А. Некрасова, Ивановский государственный университет. p. 230.

=== Fiction ===
- Kuzmin, L. I. (1981). "VII". Чудесное яблоко. О художнике Честнякове [Miraculous apple. About the artist Chestnyakov] (in Russian). М.: Детская литература. p. 88.
- Shapovnikov, V. I. (1978). Ефимов кордон [Efimov cordon]. Новинки «Современника» (in Russian). М.: Современник. p. 430.
