= Oponskoye Kingdom =

Mythical kingdom in Russian folklore

In Russian folklore the Oponskoye Kingdom (Russian: Опонское/опоньское царство, romanized: Oponskoye/opon'skoe tsarstvo, supposed to mean Yaponskoye tsarstvo, or "kingdom of Japan"), or as some English-language sources have it, Kingdom of Opona, is a mythical kingdom, envisioned by Russian peasants as lying at the edge of the flat Earth. Here, they believed, the peasants lived happy lives undisturbed by the state or the gentry, under a "White Tsar" who ruled truly and justly. Other names in legend include the Golden Land the Land of Chud and Belovodye ("Land of White Water").

== History ==
The myth of the Utopian kingdom of old Russia is similar to other myths of "earthly paradises", (Note: The art historian Svetlana Katkova suggested that Russian and Soviet artist Efim Chestnyakov (1874-1961) represented the Oponskoy Kingdom in his painting The City of Universal Welfare) - out of sight but possibly reachable - like Shambhala, El Dorado, etc. - by the right courageous explorer.

Initially some Russians treated the tale of Belovodye as hearsay about a real place. Groups of peasants from various regions of Russia wandered in the far north of Russia trying to find the mythical utopia. There was strain of Old Believers called "Runners" (Russian: Бегуны) or "Wanderers" (Russian: странники), since they spent their lives wandering, and some researchers asserted that they were instrumental in the propagation of the legend. However other researchers have arguments against this hypothesis. About 1900 the tale gradually transformed from a "real thing" into an element of Russian folklore.

== See also ==
- Buyan island
- Hyperborea
- Iriy
- Kitezh city
- Cockaigne

== Bibliography ==
- Ellwood, Robert (2008). Myth: Key Concepts in Religion. London & New York: Continuum International Publishing Group. ISBN 9781847062352.
- Figes, Orlando (2014). A People's Tragedy: The Russian Revolution 1891–1924. London: The Bodley Head. ISBN 9781847922915.
