= Gorshechensky District =

Gorshechensky District Горшеченский район (Russian)
- District
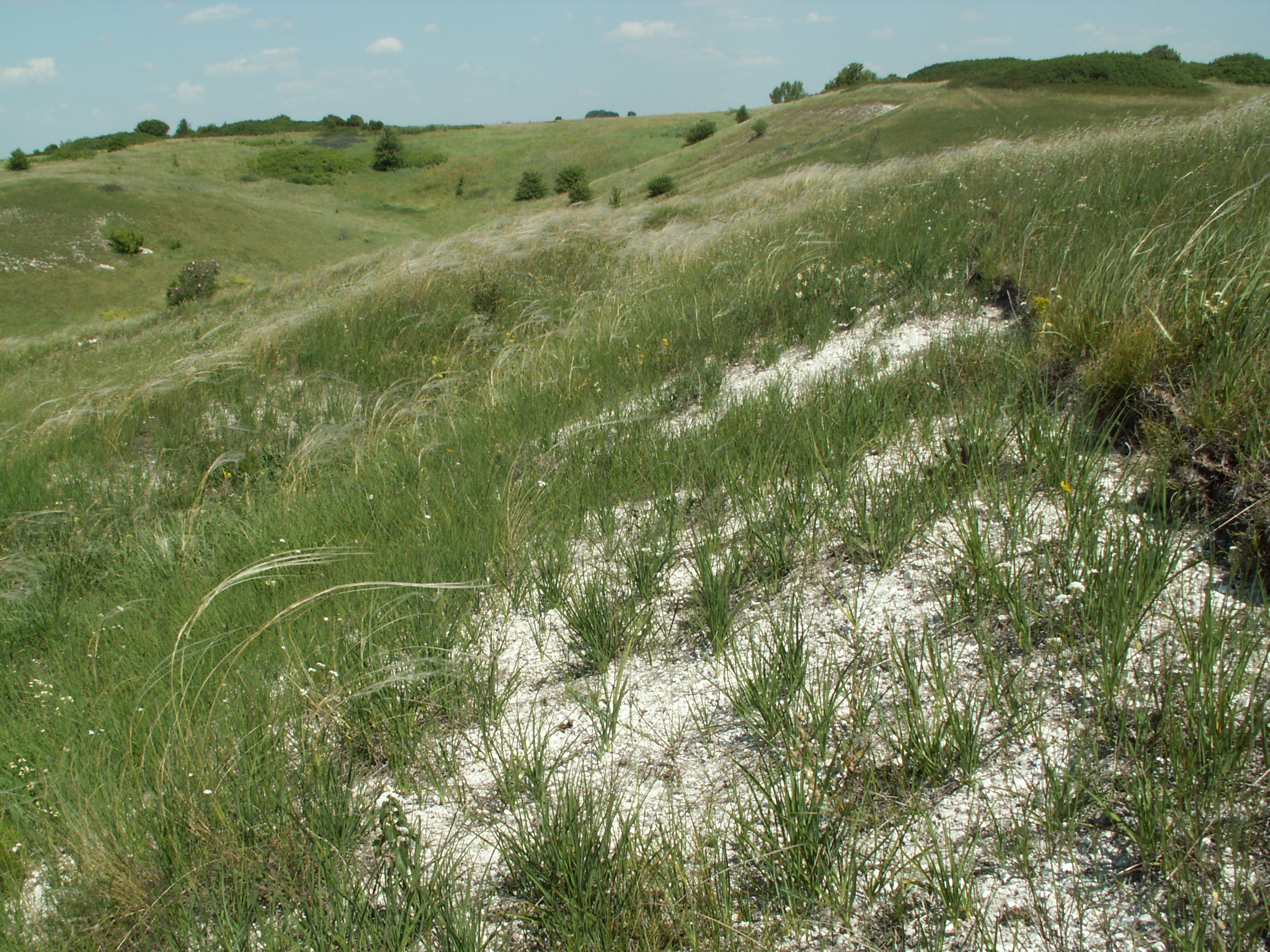
- Steppe landscape in Central Black Earth Nature Reserve, Gorshechensky District

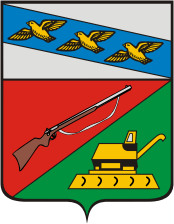
- Coat of arms
- Location of Gorshechensky District in Kursk Oblast
- Coordinates: 51°31′11″N 38°01′46″E
- Country: Russia
- Federal subject: Kursk Oblast
- Established: 1928
- Administrative center: Gorshechnoye

Area
  - Total: 1,400 km^{2} (540 sq mi)

Population (2010 Census)
  - Total: 18,591
  - Density: 13/km^{2} (34/sq mi)
  - Urban: 33.0%
  - Rural: 67.0%

Administrative structure
  - Administrative divisions: 1 Work settlements, 15 Selsoviets
  - Inhabited localities: 1 urban-type settlements, 79 rural localities

Municipal structure
  - Municipally incorporated as: Gorshechensky Municipal District
  - Municipal divisions: 1 urban settlements, 14 rural settlements
- Time zone: UTC+3 (MSK)
- OKTMO ID: 38606000
- Website: http://gorshechr.rkursk.ru/

Gorshechensky District (Russian: Горше́ченский райо́н) is an administrative and municipal district (raion), one of the twenty-eight in Kursk Oblast, Russia. It is located in the east of the oblast. The area of the district is 1,400 square kilometers (540 sq mi). Its administrative center is the urban locality (a work settlement) of Gorshechnoye. Population: 14,678 (2021 census); 18,591 (2010 census); 22,835 (2002 Census); 26,372 (1989 Soviet census). The population of Gorshechnoye accounts for 34.8% of the district's total population.

== Geography ==
Gorshechensky District is located in the south-east of Kursk Oblast. The terrain is hilly plain averaging 200 meters above sea level; the district lies on the Central Russian Upland. The main river in the district is the Oskol River, which flows out of the district to the south, where it empties into the Donets River, and ultimately the Don River. The district is 110 km east of the city of Kursk, and 350 km south of Moscow. The area measures 30 km (north-south), and 50 km (west-east). The administrative center is the town of Gorshechnoye.

The district is bordered on the north by Kastorensky District, on the east by Nizhnedevitsky District of Voronezh Oblast, on the south by Starooskolsky District of Belgorod Oblast, and on the west by Manturovsky District.
