= Iriy =

Mythical place in Slavic mythology

Iriy, Vyrai (Belarusian: Вырай, Polish: Wyraj), Vyriy (Russian: Вырий, Ирий, Ирей, Ukrainian: Вирій, Ірій, Ирій), or Irij (Croatian, Czech, Slovak: Ráj, Raj, Irij, Serbian: Ириј) is a mythical place in Slavic mythology where "birds fly for the winter and souls go after death" that is sometimes identified with paradise. Spring is believed to have arrived on Earth from Vyrai.

According to Andrzej Szyjewski, initially the Early Slavs believed in only one Vyrai, connected to the deity known as Rod—it was apparently located far away beyond the sea, at the end of the Milky Way. According to folkloristic fables, the gates of Vyrai were guarded by Veles, who sometimes took the animal form of a raróg, grasping in its claws the keys to the otherworlds. It was often imagined as a garden beyond an iron gate that barred the living from entering, located in the crown of the cosmic tree. Whereas the branches were said to be nested by the birds, who were usually identified as human souls.

The etymological reconstruction of the word, supported by preserved beliefs, allows us to connect the Iriy with the oldest Slavic ideas about the other world, which is located underground or beyond the sea, where the path lies through water, in particular, through a whirlpool. The pagan Slavic peoples thought the birds flying away to Vyrai for the winter and returning to Earth for the spring to be human souls. According to some folk tales, the human soul departs the Earth for Vyrai during the cremation of its deceased flesh on a pyre; however, it does not stay in paradise forever, returning some time later to the womb of a pregnant woman (traces of reincarnation can be seen in this belief)—carried by a stork or nightjar.

Boris Uspenskij, having analyzed the extensive ethnographic material about Iriy, concluded that "Iriy" is a general designation of the otherworld (i.e., not a real geographical place).

== Etymology ==
This term is sometimes said to be derived from rai, the Slavic word for paradise, but this is probably a folk etymology. It could be derived from the Proto-Slavic *rajъ in connection with the Persian rayí (wealth, happiness). Similarities to other languages have also been found, for example: the Greek éar (spring), Sanskrit áranyas (alien, distant), or the Proto-Indo-European *ūr- (water), but none of these three theories have found common recognition or approval.

== Heaven and hell ==
Eventually the idea of Vyrai was split into two separate realms, most likely under the influence of Christianity. One Vyrai, for birds, was located in the heavens (simply another version of the original myth) and another underground for snakes/dragons, which is perceived as analogous to Christian hell. During the Christianization of Kievan Rus' and the Baptism of Poland, people were able to imagine heaven and hell based on the idea of Vyrai.

== Vyrai and storks ==
Storks carried unborn souls from Vyrai to Earth.

== See also ==
- Early Slavs
- Elysium
- Kingdom of Opona
- Nav
- Slavic paganism
