= Efim Chestnyakov =

Russian and Soviet artist

Efim Vasilievich Chestnyakov
- Born: Efim Samoilov; 31 December [O.S. 19 December] 1874; Prislonikha, Simbirsk, Russian Empire
- Died: 28 June 1961 (aged 86); Shablovo, Kologrivsky Uyezd, Kostroma Governorate, Russian Empire
- Known for: Painting, sculpture, literature

Efim Vasilievich Chestnyakov (Russian: Ефи́м Васи́льевич Честняко́в; December 19 [31], 1874, Shablovo, Kostroma province — June 27, 1961, Shablovo, Kostroma region) was a Russian painter (created portraits and fairy tale subjects), writer (known for his fairy tales, stories, a novel in verse, poems, reflections), sculptor (worked in clay plastic), and the creator of the children's theater in Shablovo.

== Biography ==
Efim Chestnyakov was born on December 19 (31), 1874 in the village of Shablovo, Kologrivsky uyezd, Kostroma Governorate, in the peasant family of Samoilovs. He was the only son of three children, and charged with family's support (such children, on whom the support of the family fell, were called chestnyak, from Russian "an honest person", and that's where his surname comes from).

Since childhood he was interested in painting. He learned to read and write at first with a private teacher, and then at the Zemstvo public school in the village of Krutets. His first teacher in the village was his uncle Frol. Later, when a zemstvo school was opened a short distance from the village, Chestnyakov enrolled there.

In 1889, he graduated from the Kologriva District School, where his first professional mentor was the artist Ivan Borisovich Perfiliev, a teacher of drawing and drafting. Perfiliev also organized amateur performances in Kologriva, but in 1908 he was exiled to Siberia. In protest against this injustice, Chestnyakov's older sister Alexandra, a graduate of the Kologriva Women's Progymnasium, refused a golden medal.

From 1889 to June 3 (15), 1894, Chestnyakov studied at the Novinsky Teachers' Seminary in the village of Novinskoye, Yaroslavl province. His studies were supported by a scholarship from a Moscow merchant of the first guild, K. A. Popov, a native of the Kostroma village of Bolshiye Soli. The seminary left Chestnyakov with difficult memories, but despite the difficulties he continued to develop his worldview independently. After graduating from the seminary a new stage began for him — critical understanding of life and its contradictions.

In 1894-1895, Efim Chestnyakov worked as a folk teacher in the village of Zdemirovo, Kostroma uyezd, and from 1895 to July 1896, he taught at the elementary school of the orphanage for juvenile delinquents in Kostroma. From September 1896 to November 1899, he was a teacher at the Zemstvo public school in the village of Uglets, Kineshma uyezd. Efim Chestnyakov ended up teaching in the Vichuga region, one of the largest factory regions of the Russian Empire. Many people lived here, so a center was created, which gave birth to a number of outstanding personalities (among whom Efim Chestnyakov was included). The young teacher immediately attracted the attention of the local intelligentsia. He got acquainted with many progressive people, who gave him the opportunity to read a wide range of artistic, socio-political and scientific literature (some copies of which he kept in Shablovo until the end of his life).

Chestnyakov's artistic abilities were appreciated by the local intellectual community, which saw a great future in Efim and began to encourage Chestnyakov to develop his talent in every possible way. Thanks to the efforts and connections of Efim Chestnyakov's Kineshma acquaintances in St. Petersburg, the opportunity to study in the capital came up to him.

In 1899, Repin's expressed a good opinio about his work and gave him the positive answer. The collection of public funds began. By his trip to St. Petersburg in the fall of 1899, a rather large sum was collected — more than 300 rubles. As a teacher of the zemstvo school, E. Chestnyakov received about 20 rubles a month. In the future, the charity fund for Efim Chestnyakov's studies was constantly replenished with funds, during the holidays Chestnyakov came to Vichuga to make his creative reports, as well as to realize a part of the paintings in the charity lottery. On the other hand, in St. Petersburg, I. E. Repin and his assistant Shcherbinovsky wrote reviews intended for the benefactors.

In the autumn of the revolutionary 1905, Chestnyakov left his studies and returned to Shablovo. He promised Vichuga's benefactors that he would return to St. Petersburg, but he could not return until 1913. Nevertheless, he received money from Vichuga every month until July 1908.

== Rediscovery ==
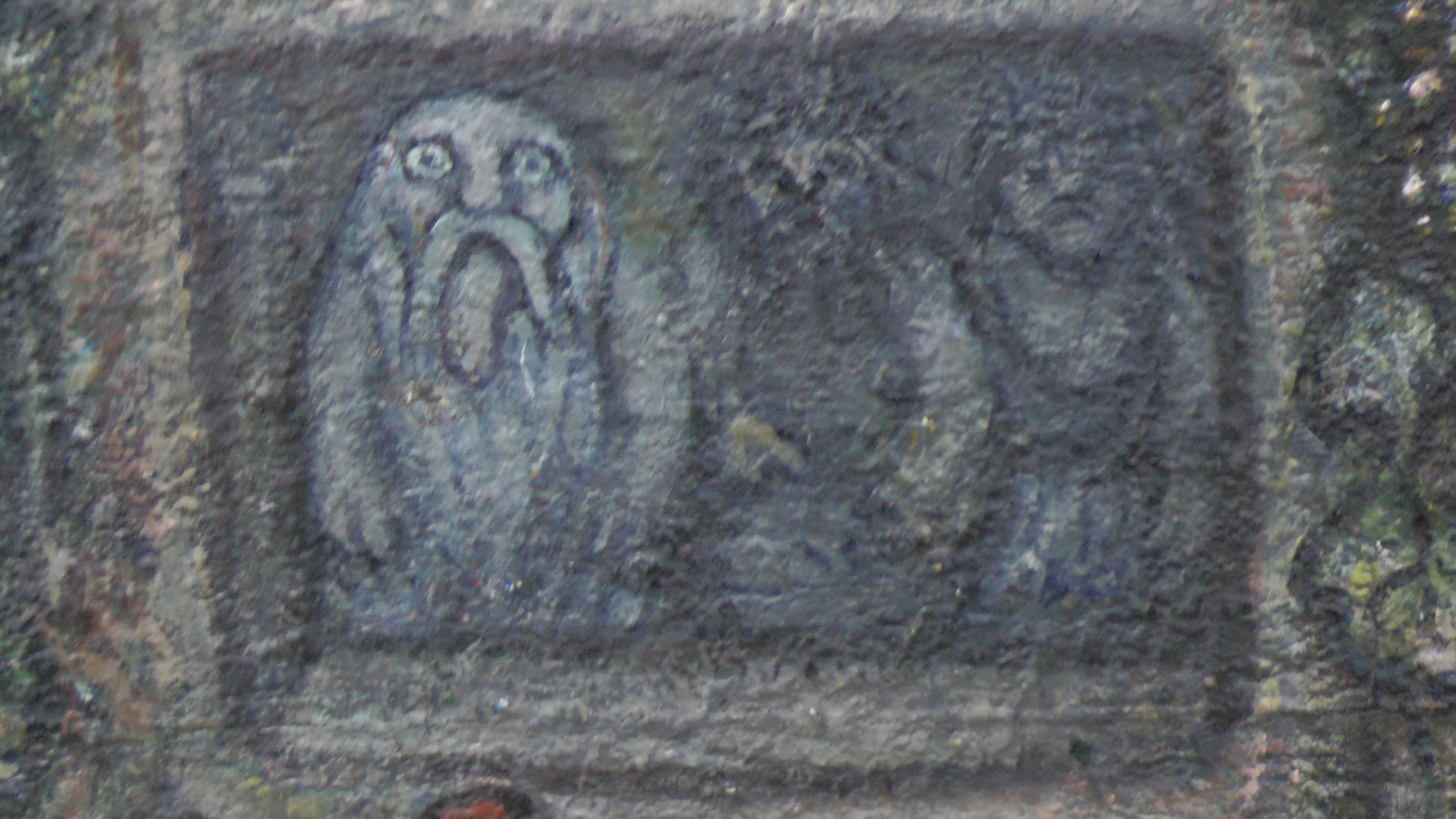
Fragment of the Chestnyakov painting Festive Procession with a Song. Kolyada, after 1917

In the summer of 1968, during the annual research expedition of the Kostroma Museum of Fine Arts, while visiting the Kologriva district, the expedition staff found a significant part of the paintings, which was transferred to the museum.

In October 1971, the Kostroma Museum staff, headed by its director V. Y. Ignatiev, came to Kologriv again to collect new information about the artist. Efim Chestnyakov's niece, Galina Aleksandrovna Smirnova, gave the museum staff Chestnyakov's manuscripts and documents, which she had kept in his hut after the artist's death.

In the summer of 1975, the third scientific expedition of the Kostroma Museum to the Kologriva district was organized to search for new materials related to the life and work of Efim Chestnyakov. New testimonies of the artist's life, part of his library and manuscripts were obtained.

The restoration of the paintings began in the 1970s, under the direction of Savva Yamshchikov. The paintings that were restored at that time were in a difficult condition. Almost all the paintings had crumbling of the ground and the paint layer, which needed to be reinforced. Many paintings had to be restored, because of the canvas deformation. One of the paintings, The City of Universal Welfare, was cut into five pieces. One of the most difficult to restore was the painting Kolyada, made on a very thin canvas. Because of the lack of a stretcher, the canvas got shrank and shrived, so the painting torn into pieces. Despite all the difficulties of restoration, none of the discovered paintings was lost.

== See also ==
- The City of Universal Welfare
- Festive Procession with a Song. Kolyada

== Bibliography ==
- Bogemskaya, К. G. (2010). Честняков Ефим Васильевич (1874—1961) // Любительское художественное творчество в России XX века. Словарь [Efim Vasilyevich Chestnyakov (1874-1961) // Amateur Artistic Creativity in Russia in the 20th Century. Dictionary] (in Russian). М.: Прогресс-Традиция. pp. 465–467. ISBN 978-5-89826-334-8.
- Golushkin, S. S. (1985). Реставрация картин Ефима Честнякова // Ефим Честняков. Новые открытия советских реставраторов [Restoration of paintings by Efim Chestnyakov // Efim Chestnyakov. New discoveries of Soviet restorers] (in Russian). М.: Советский художник. pp. 7–9.
- Chestnyakov, E. Лирика [Lyric] (in Russian). Кострома: 2001.
- Chestnyakov, E. (1999). Поэзия [Poetry] (in Russian). М.
- Chestnyakov, E. (1990). Сергиюшко: сказка: для младшего школьного возраста [Sergiyushko: a fairy tale for primary school age] (in Russian). М.: Интербук. ISBN 5-7664-0130-2.
- Chestnyakov, E. V. (2007). "Сказание о Стафии — Короле Тетеревином" (роман-сказка) [“The Tale of Stafia the King of the Tetheravine” (a fairy tale novel)] (in Russian). М.
- Shaposhnikov, V. I. (1979). "Ефимов кордон" [Efimov's cordon] (in Russian). М.
- Yamschikov, S. V. (1985). Ефим Честняков. Новые открытия советских реставраторов [Efim Chestnyakov. New Discoveries of Soviet Restorers] (in Russian). М.
- Ignatyev V. Ya., Trofimov E. P. (1988). Мир Ефима Честнякова [Efim Chestnyakov's world] (in Russian). М.: Молодая гвардия. p. 221. ISBN 5-235-00090-0.
- Ignatyev, V. Ya. (1995). Ефим Васильевич Честняков [Efim Vasilievich Chestnyakov] (in Russian). Кострома.
- Gantsovskaya, N. S. (2007). Живое поунженское слово. Словарь народно-разговорного языка Е. В. Честнякова [Lively Pounzh word. Dictionary of the folk and colloquial language by E. V. Chestnyakov] (in Russian). Кострома.
- Пути в избах. Трикнижие о шабловском праведнике, художнике Ефиме Честнякове [Paths in the huts. Trickbook about the Shablovsk righteous man, artist Efim Chestnyakov] (in Russian). М. 2008.
- Kuzmin, L. I. (1981). Чудесное яблоко. Рассказ о художнике Честнякове [Miraculous apple. A story about the artist Chestnyakov] (in Russian). М.: Детская литература.
- Shavarinsky, I. S. (2016). Театр Ефима Честнякова как феномен культуры: к проблеме синтетической природы творчества и его рецепции. Диссертация на соискание учёной степени кандидата культурологии [Efim Chestnyakov's theater as a cultural phenomenon: to the problem of synthetic nature of creativity and its reception. Dissertation for the degree of Candidate of Cultural Studies] (in Russian). Иваново: Костромской государственный университет имени Н. А. Некрасова, Ивановский государственный университет. p. 230.
- Экспедиционные записи о Ефиме Честнякове. Запись и публикация Назаровой А. Г. [Expeditionary records about Efim Chestnyakov. Recorded and published by Nazarova A. G.] (in Russian). Русская земля: Журнал. 2019.
- Чудесное яблоко. Иванушко. Сергеюшко (сказки и рисунки Ефима Честнякова) [A miraculous apple. Ivanushko. Sergeyushko (fairy tales and drawings by Efim Chestnyakov)] (in Russian). СПб. 1914.
