= Gorshechnoye =

Gorshechnoye Горшечное
- Urban-type settlement
- Interactive map of Gorshechnoye
- Location of Gorshechnoye Gorshechnoye (Kursk Oblast)
- Coordinates: 51.5211°N 38.0333°E
- Country: Russia
- Federal subject: Kursk Oblast
- Administrative district: Gorshechensky District
- Elevation: 246 m (807 ft)

Population (2010 Census)
  - Total: 6,137
  - Estimate (2025): 4,897 (−20.2%)
- Time zone: UTC+3 (MSK)
- Postal code: 306800
- OKTMO ID: 38606151051

Gorshechnoye (Russian: Горшечное) is an urban locality (an urban-type settlement) in Gorshechensky District of Kursk Oblast, Russia. Population: 5,106 (2021 census); 6,137 (2010 census); 6,915 (2002 census); 6,863 (1989 Soviet census).

== History ==
On 25 January 1943, the settlement (then under German occupation) was recaptured by the Soviet 40th Army, enabling the continuation of Soviet operations towards Stary Oskol.
