= Kologrivsky District =

Kologrivsky District Кологривский район (Russian)
- District
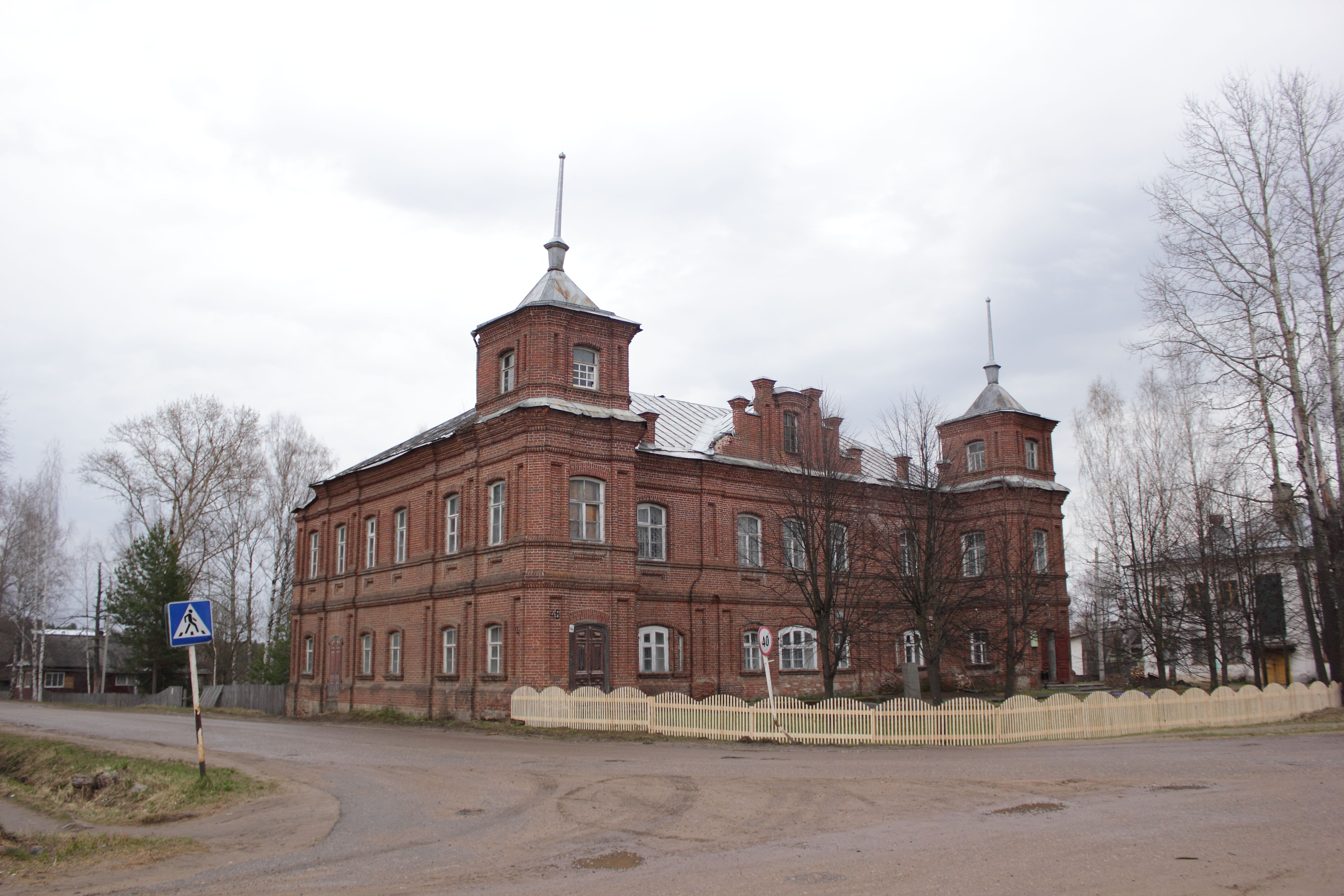
- Kologriv History Museum, Kologrivsky District

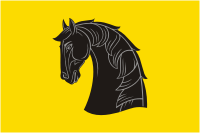
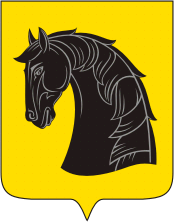
- Flag Coat of arms
- Location of Kologrivsky District in Kostroma Oblast
- Coordinates: 58°50′N 44°20′E
- Country: Russia
- Federal subject: Kostroma Oblast
- Established: 15 July 1929
- Administrative center: Kologriv

Area
  - Total: 3,520 km^{2} (1,360 sq mi)

Population (2010 Census)
  - Total: 6,474
  - Density: 1.84/km^{2} (4.76/sq mi)
  - Urban: 51.2%
  - Rural: 48.8%

Administrative structure
  - Administrative divisions: 1 Towns of district significance, 4 Settlements
  - Inhabited localities: 1 cities/towns, 79 rural localities

Municipal structure
  - Municipally incorporated as: Kologrivsky Municipal District
  - Municipal divisions: 1 urban settlements, 4 rural settlements
- Website: https://kologriv.org/

Kologrivsky District (Russian: Кологри́вский райо́н) is an administrative and municipal district (raion), one of the twenty-four in Kostroma Oblast, Russia. It is located in the north of the oblast. The area of the district is 3,520 square kilometers (1,360 sq mi). Its administrative center is the town of Kologriv. Population: 4,370 (2021 census); 6,474 (2010 census); 8,566 (2002 Census); 11,493 (1989 Soviet census). The population of Kologriv accounts for 56.5% of the district's total population.
