= Krutets =

Krutets Крутец
- Village
- Location within Vladimir Oblast Location within Russia
- Coordinates: 56°21′N 38°44′E
- Country: Russia
- Region: Vladimir Oblast
- District: Alexandrovsky District
- Time zone: UTC+3:00

Krutets (Russian: Крутец) is a rural locality (a village) in Andreyevskoye Rural Settlement, Alexandrovsky District, Vladimir Oblast, Russia. The population was 61 as of 2010. There are 8 streets.

== Geography ==
Krutets is located on the bank of the Seraya River, 7 km southeast of Alexandrov (the district's administrative centre) by road. Novinki is the nearest rural locality.
