= Kologriv =

Town in Kostroma Oblast, Russia

Kologriv Кологрив
- Town
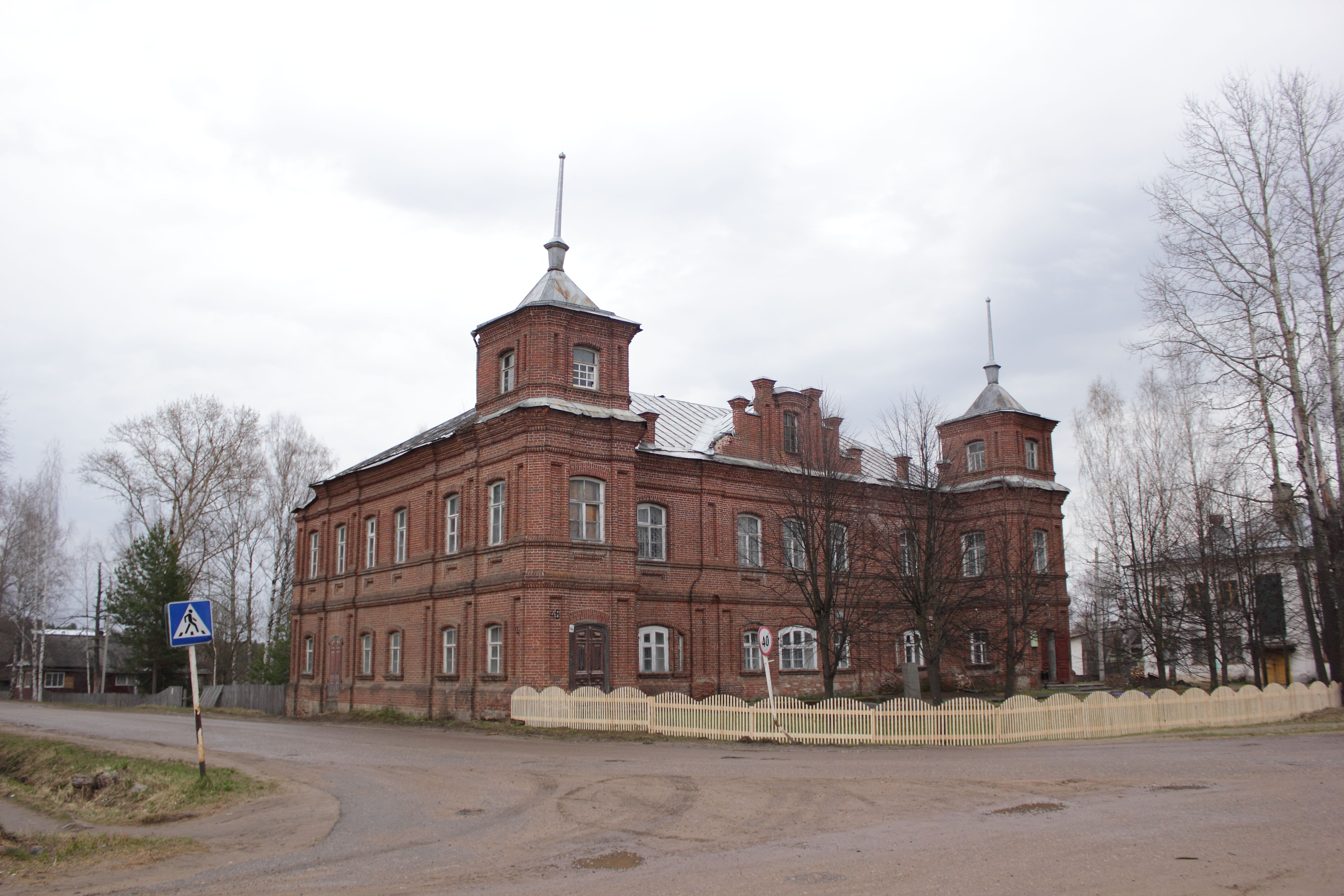
- Local History Museum in Kologriv

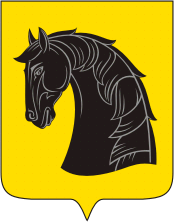
- Coat of arms
- Interactive map of Kologriv
- Location of Kologriv Kologriv (Kostroma Oblast)
- Coordinates: 58°48′N 44°20′E
- Country: Russia
- Federal subject: Kostroma Oblast
- Administrative district: Kologrivsky District
- Town of district significanceSelsoviet: Kologriv
- First mentioned: beginning of the 16th century
- Town status since: 1778
- Elevation: 140 m (460 ft)

Population (2010 Census)
  - Total: 3,314
  - Estimate (2025): 2,299 (−30.6%)

Administrative status
  - Capital of: Kologrivsky District, town of district significance of Kologriv

Municipal status
  - Municipal district: Kologrivsky Municipal District
  - Urban settlement: Kologriv Urban Settlement
  - Capital of: Kologrivsky Municipal District, Kologriv Urban Settlement
- Time zone: UTC+3 (MSK)
- Postal code: 157440
- OKTMO ID: 34612101001
- Website: kologriv.org

Kologriv (Russian: Кологри́в) is a town and the administrative center of Kologrivsky District in Kostroma Oblast, Russia, located on the left bank of the Unzha River 339 kilometers (211 mi) northeast of Kostroma, the administrative center of the oblast. Population: 2,468 (2021 census); 3,314 (2010 census); 3,700 (2002 census); 4,306 (1989 Soviet census).

== History ==
Kologriv is first mentioned in chronicles in the beginning of the 16th century. It was granted town status in 1778.

== Geography ==
=== Climate ===
Climate data for Kologriv
Month	Jan	Feb	Mar	Apr	May	Jun	Jul	Aug	Sep	Oct	Nov	Dec	Year
Record high °C (°F)	4.4 (39.9)	6.8 (44.2)	16.6 (61.9)	27.5 (81.5)	32.5 (90.5)	35.0 (95.0)	35.8 (96.4)	36.3 (97.3)	29.8 (85.6)	23.1 (73.6)	11.7 (53.1)	7.5 (45.5)	36.3 (97.3)
Mean daily maximum °C (°F)	−7.6 (18.3)	−5.7 (21.7)	1.0 (33.8)	9.6 (49.3)	17.9 (64.2)	21.6 (70.9)	24.1 (75.4)	20.9 (69.6)	14.7 (58.5)	6.3 (43.3)	−1.4 (29.5)	−5.8 (21.6)	8.0 (46.3)
Daily mean °C (°F)	−10.9 (12.4)	−9.8 (14.4)	−3.9 (25.0)	3.6 (38.5)	10.9 (51.6)	15.2 (59.4)	17.7 (63.9)	14.9 (58.8)	9.6 (49.3)	3.1 (37.6)	−3.6 (25.5)	−8.4 (16.9)	3.2 (37.8)
Mean daily minimum °C (°F)	−14.1 (6.6)	−13.6 (7.5)	−8.4 (16.9)	−1.5 (29.3)	4.4 (39.9)	9.1 (48.4)	11.8 (53.2)	9.6 (49.3)	5.5 (41.9)	0.4 (32.7)	−5.8 (21.6)	−11.2 (11.8)	−1.2 (29.9)
Record low °C (°F)	−46.3 (−51.3)	−43.0 (−45.4)	−36.4 (−33.5)	−25.9 (−14.6)	−9.1 (15.6)	−3.2 (26.2)	1.0 (33.8)	−3.5 (25.7)	−10.1 (13.8)	−20.6 (−5.1)	−36.0 (−32.8)	−49.8 (−57.6)	−49.8 (−57.6)
Average precipitation mm (inches)	40 (1.6)	33 (1.3)	33 (1.3)	30 (1.2)	47 (1.9)	80 (3.1)	64 (2.5)	67 (2.6)	48 (1.9)	58 (2.3)	44 (1.7)	43 (1.7)	587 (23.1)
Source: www.pogodaiklimat.ru

== Administrative and municipal status ==
Within the framework of administrative divisions, Kologriv serves as the administrative center of the Kologrivsky District. As an administrative division, it includes seven rural localities, incorporated within Kologrivsky District as the town of district significance of Kologriv. As a municipal division, the town of district significance of Kologriv is incorporated within Kologrivsky Municipal District as Kologriv Urban Settlement.

== Notable people ==
- Olga Ladyzhenskaya (1922–2004), mathematician
- Gennady Ladyzhensky (1852–1916), painter
