= Manturovsky District =

Location of Kostroma Oblast in Russia

Location of Kursk Oblast in Russia

Manturovsky District is the name of several administrative and municipal districts in Russia:

- Manturovsky District, Kostroma Oblast, an administrative and municipal district of Kostroma Oblast
- Manturovsky District, Kursk Oblast, an administrative and municipal district of Kursk Oblast
