= Grigorovo =

Grigorovo (Russian: Григорово) may refer to one of the following places in Russia:

- Grigorovo, Novgorod Oblast
- Grigorovo, Alexandrovsky District, Vladimir Oblast
- Grigorovo, Melenkovsky District, Vladimir Oblast
- Grigorovo, Yuryev-Polsky District, Vladimir Oblast
- Grigorovo, Krasnoplamenskoye Rural Settlement, Alexandrovsky District, Vladimir Oblast
- Grigorovo, Slednevskoye Rural Settlement, Alexandrovsky District, Vladimir Oblast
- Grigorovo, Kaduysky District, Vologda Oblast
