= Danilkovo =

Danilkovo (Russian: Данилково) is the name of several rural localities in Russia:

- Danilkovo, Krasnoplamenskoye Rural Settlement, Alexandrovsky District, Vladimir Oblast, a village in Krasnoplamenskoye Rural Settlement of Alexandrovsky District in Vladimir Oblast
- Danilkovo, Vyaznikovsky District, Vladimir Oblast, a village in the town of Vyazniki of Vyaznikovsky District in Vladimir Oblast
- Danilkovo, Kaduysky District, Vologda Oblast, a village in Nikolskoye Rural Settlement of Kaduysky District in Vologda Oblast
