= Staraya =

Staraya Старая
- Village
- Location within Vladimir Oblast Location within Russia
- Coordinates: 56°27′N 38°22′E
- Country: Russia
- Region: Vladimir Oblast
- District: Alexandrovsky District
- Time zone: UTC+3:00

Staraya (Russian: Старая) is a rural locality (a village) in Krasnoplamenskoye Rural Settlement, Alexandrovsky District, Vladimir Oblast, Russia. The population was 11 as of 2010. There are 3 streets.

== Geography ==
The village is located 17 km south-west from Krasnoye Plamya, 22 km north-west from Alexandrov.
