= Arsaki =

Arsaki (Russian: Арсаки) is the name of two rural localities in Slednevskoye Rural Settlement, Alexandrovsky District, Vladimir Oblast, Russia:

- Arsaki (hamlet), Vladimir Oblast, a hamlet
- Arsaki (settlement), Vladimir Oblast, a settlement
