= Starinki =

Starinki Старинки
- Village
- Location within Vladimir Oblast Location within Russia
- Coordinates: 56°20′N 38°25′E
- Country: Russia
- Region: Vladimir Oblast
- District: Alexandrovsky District
- Time zone: UTC+3:00

Starinki (Russian: Старинки) is a rural locality (a village) in Karinskoye Rural Settlement, Alexandrovsky District, Vladimir Oblast, Russia. The population was 1 as of 2010. There is 1 street.

== Geography ==
The village is located 21 km south-west from Bolshoye Karinskoye, 25 km south-west from Alexandrov.
