= Dudenevo =

Dudenevo (Russian: Дуденево) is the name of several rural localities in Russia:

- Dudenevo, Nizhny Novgorod Oblast, a selo in Dudenevsky Selsoviet of Bogorodsky District of Nizhny Novgorod Oblast
- Dudenevo, Tver Oblast, a village in Kalininsky District of Tver Oblast
- Dudenevo, Vladimir Oblast, a village in Alexandrovsky District of Vladimir Oblast
- Dudenevo, Vologda Oblast, a village in Yurovsky Selsoviet of Gryazovetsky District of Vologda Oblast
- Dudenevo, Yaroslavl Oblast, a village in Breytovsky Rural Okrug of Breytovsky District of Yaroslavl Oblast
