= Sokolovo, Alexandrovsky District, Vladimir Oblast =

Sokolovo Соколово
- Village
- Location within Vladimir Oblast Location within Russia
- Coordinates: 56°23′N 38°35′E
- Country: Russia
- Region: Vladimir Oblast
- District: Alexandrovsky District
- Time zone: UTC+3:00

Sokolovo (Russian: Соколово) is a rural locality (a village) in Slednevskoye Rural Settlement, Alexandrovsky District, Vladimir Oblast, Russia. The population was 93 as of 2010.

== Geography ==
The village is located 4 km south from Slednevo, 10 km west from Alexandrov.
