= Prechistino (Slednevskoye Rural Settlement), Alexandrovsky District, Vladimir Oblast =

Prechistino Пречистино
- Village
- Location within Vladimir Oblast Location within Russia
- Coordinates: 56°26′N 38°24′E
- Country: Russia
- Region: Vladimir Oblast
- District: Alexandrovsky District
- Time zone: UTC+3:00

Prechistino (Russian: Пречистино) is a rural locality (a village) in Slednevskoye Rural Settlement, Alexandrovsky District, Vladimir Oblast, Russia. The population was 7 as of 2010.

== Geography ==
The village is located 14 km north-west from Slednevo, 21 km north-west from Alexandrov.
