= Goltsovo =

Goltsovo (Russian: Гольцово) is the name of several rural localities in Russia:

- Goltsovo, Vladimir Oblast, a village in Krasnoplamenskoye Rural Settlement of Alexandrovsky District in Vladimir Oblast
- Goltsovo, Vologda Oblast, a village in Ust-Alexeyevskoye Rural Settlement of Velikoustyugsky District in Vologda Oblast
