= Stepanikha (Slednevskoye Rural Settlement), Alexandrovsky District, Vladimir Oblast =

Stepanikha Степаниха
- Village
- Location within Vladimir Oblast Location within Russia
- Coordinates: 56°27′N 38°41′E
- Country: Russia
- Region: Vladimir Oblast
- District: Alexandrovsky District
- Time zone: UTC+3:00

Stepanikha (Russian: Степаниха) is a rural locality (a village) in Slednevskoye Rural Settlement, Alexandrovsky District, Vladimir Oblast, Russia. The population was 6 as of 2010.

== Geography ==
The village is located 10 km north-east from Slednevo, 7 km north from Alexandrov.
