= Demyanovo (disambiguation) =

Demyanovo is a town in Kirov Oblast, Russia. Demyanovo may also refer to:

- Demyanovo, Gryazovetsky District, Vologda Oblast
- Demyanovo, Velikoustyugsky District, Vologda Oblast
- Demyanovo, Vladimir Oblast
