= Mashkovo =

Mashkovo Машково
- Village
- Location within Vladimir Oblast Location within Russia
- Coordinates: 56°23′N 38°39′E
- Country: Russia
- Region: Vladimir Oblast
- District: Alexandrovsky District
- Time zone: UTC+3:00

Mashkovo (Russian: Машково) is a rural locality (a village) in Slednevskoye Rural Settlement, Alexandrovsky District, Vladimir Oblast, Russia. The population was 36 as of 2010. There are 7 streets.

== Geography ==
Mashkovo is located 6 km west of Alexandrov (the district's administrative centre) by road. Naumovo is the nearest rural locality.
