= Danilkovo, Krasnoplamenskoye Rural Settlement, Alexandrovsky District, Vladimir Oblast =

Danilkovo Данилково
- Village
- Location within Vladimir Oblast Location within Russia
- Coordinates: 56°29′N 38°25′E
- Country: Russia
- Region: Vladimir Oblast
- District: Alexandrovsky District
- Time zone: UTC+3:00

Danilkovo (Russian: Данилково) is a rural locality (a village) in Krasnoplamenskoye Rural Settlement, Alexandrovsky District, Vladimir Oblast, Russia. The population was 11 as of 2010.

== Geography ==
The village is located 13 km south-west from Krasnoye Plamya, 25 km north-west from Alexandrov.
