= Svinkino =

Svinkino Свинкино
- Village
- Location within Vladimir Oblast Location within Russia
- Coordinates: 56°28′N 38°49′E
- Country: Russia
- Region: Vladimir Oblast
- District: Alexandrovsky District
- Time zone: UTC+3:00

Svinkino (Russian: Свинкино) is a rural locality (a village) in Slednevskoye Rural Settlement, Alexandrovsky District, Vladimir Oblast, Russia. The population was 4 as of 2010. There is 1 street.

== Geography ==
Svinkino is located on the Seraya River, 15 km northeast of Alexandrov (the district's administrative centre) by road. Temkino is the nearest rural locality.
