= Agafonka, Vladimir Oblast =

Agafonka Агафонка
- Village
- Location within Vladimir Oblast Location within Russia
- Coordinates: 56°39′N 38°22′E
- Country: Russia
- Region: Vladimir Oblast
- District: Alexandrovsky District
- Time zone: UTC+3:00

Agafonka (Russian: Агафонка) is a rural locality (a village) in Krasnoplamenskoye Rural Settlement, Alexandrovsky District, Vladimir Oblast, Russia. The population was 14 as of 2010. There is 1 street.

== Geography ==
Agafonka is located 58 km northwest of Alexandrov (the district's administrative centre) by road. Vishnyakovo is the nearest rural locality.
