= Grigorovo, Alexandrovsky District, Vladimir Oblast =

Village in Vladimir Oblast, Russia

Grigorovo Григорово
- Village
- Location within Vladimir Oblast Location within Russia
- Coordinates: 56°18′N 38°28′E
- Country: Russia
- Region: Vladimir Oblast
- District: Alexandrovsky District
- Time zone: UTC+3:00

Grigorovo (Russian: Григорово) is a rural locality (a village) in Karinskoye Rural Settlement, Alexandrovsky District, Vladimir Oblast, Russia. The population was 102 as of 2010.

== Geography ==
The village is located 16 km south-west from Bolshoye Karinskoye, 21 km south-west from Alexandrov.
