= Izmaylovo, Vladimir Oblast =

Izmaylovo Измайлово
- Village
- Location within Vladimir Oblast Location within Russia
- Coordinates: 56°35′N 38°30′E
- Country: Russia
- Region: Vladimir Oblast
- District: Alexandrovsky District
- Time zone: UTC+3:00

Izmaylovo (Russian: Измайлово) is a rural locality (a village) in Krasnoplamenskoye Rural Settlement, Alexandrovsky District, Vladimir Oblast, Russia. The population was 18 as of 2010. There is 1 street.

== Geography ==
Izmaylovo is located 47 km northwest of Alexandrov (the district's administrative centre) by road. Pikalyovo is the nearest rural locality.
