= Ratkovo, Alexandrovsky District, Vladimir Oblast =

Ratkovo Ратьково
- Village
- Location within Vladimir Oblast Location within Russia
- Coordinates: 56°31′N 38°22′E
- Country: Russia
- Region: Vladimir Oblast
- District: Alexandrovsky District
- Time zone: UTC+3:00

Ratkovo (Russian: Ратьково) is a rural locality (a village) in Krasnoplamenskoye Rural Settlement, Alexandrovsky District, Vladimir Oblast, Russia. The population was 52 as of 2010. There are 4 streets.

== Geography ==
Ratkovo is located on the Dubna River, 36 km northwest of Alexandrov (the district's administrative centre) by road. Iskra is the nearest rural locality.
