= Korely, Vladimir Oblast =

Korely Корелы
- Village
- Location within Vladimir Oblast Location within Russia
- Coordinates: 56°29′N 38°26′E
- Country: Russia
- Region: Vladimir Oblast
- District: Alexandrovsky District
- Time zone: UTC+3:00

Korely (Russian: Корелы) is a rural locality (a village) in Krasnoplamenskoye Rural Settlement, Alexandrovsky District, Vladimir Oblast, Russia. The population was 3 as of 2010. There is 1 street.

== Geography ==
Korely is located 26 km northwest of Alexandrov (the district's administrative centre) by road. Danilkovo is the nearest rural locality.
