= Kholopovo =

Kholopovo Холопово
- Village
- Location within Vladimir Oblast Location within Russia
- Coordinates: 56°22′N 38°44′E
- Country: Russia
- Region: Vladimir Oblast
- District: Alexandrovsky District
- Time zone: UTC+3:00

Kholopovo (Russian: Холопово) is a rural locality (a village) in Andreyevskoye Rural Settlement, Alexandrovsky District, Vladimir Oblast, Russia. The population was 97 as of 2010. There is 1 street.

== Geography ==
Kholopovo is located on the Seraya River, 5 km southeast of Alexandrov (the district's administrative centre) by road. Cheryomushki is the nearest rural locality.
