= Legkovo =

Legkovo Легково
- Village
- Location within Vladimir Oblast Location within Russia
- Coordinates: 56°23′N 38°53′E
- Country: Russia
- Region: Vladimir Oblast
- District: Alexandrovsky District
- Time zone: UTC+3:00

Legkovo (Russian: Легково) is a rural locality (a village) in Andreyevskoye Rural Settlement, Alexandrovsky District, Vladimir Oblast, Russia. The population was 357 as of 2010. There are 8 streets.

== Geography ==
Legkovo is located 11 km (6.8 mi) east of Alexandrov (the district's administrative centre) by road. Vyalkovka is the nearest rural locality.
