= Samarino, Vladimir Oblast =

Samarino Самарино
- Village
- Location within Vladimir Oblast Location within Russia
- Coordinates: 56°22′N 38°50′E
- Country: Russia
- Region: Vladimir Oblast
- District: Alexandrovsky District
- Time zone: UTC+3:00

Samarino (Russian: Самарино) is a rural locality (a village) in Andreyevskoye Rural Settlement, Alexandrovsky District, Vladimir Oblast, Russia. The population was 11 as of 2010. There are 3 streets.

== Geography ==
Samarino is located 8 km southeast of Alexandrov (the district's administrative centre) by road. Volodino is the nearest rural locality.
