= Zhuklino =

Zhuklino Жуклино
- Village
- Location within Vladimir Oblast Location within Russia
- Coordinates: 56°13′N 38°29′E
- Country: Russia
- Region: Vladimir Oblast
- District: Alexandrovsky District
- Time zone: UTC+3:00

Zhuklino (Russian: Жуклино) is a rural locality (a village) in Karinskoye Rural Settlement, Alexandrovsky District, Vladimir Oblast, Russia. The population was 55 as of 2010. There are 8 streets.

== Geography ==
Zhuklino is located 35 km southwest of Alexandrov (the district's administrative centre) by road. Novozhilovo is the nearest rural locality.
