= Podsosenye =

Podsosenye Подсосенье
- Village
- Location within Vladimir Oblast Location within Russia
- Coordinates: 56°30′N 39°13′E
- Country: Russia
- Region: Vladimir Oblast
- District: Alexandrovsky District
- Time zone: UTC+3:00

Podsosenye (Russian: Подсосенье) is a rural locality (a village) in Andreyevskoye Rural Settlement, Alexandrovsky District, Vladimir Oblast, Russia. The population was 1 as of 2010.

== Geography ==
Podsosenye is located 42 km northeast of Alexandrov (the district's administrative centre) by road. Dolgopolye is the nearest rural locality.

== History ==
In the late 19th and early 20th centuries, the village was part of the Andreevsko-Godunovskaya volost of the Aleksandrovsky district, and since 1926, part of the Andreevskaya volost. In 1859, the village had 20 households, in 1905– 35 households, and in 1926 – 45 households.
