= Bukhary =

Bukhary Бухары
- Village
- Location within Vladimir Oblast Location within Russia
- Coordinates: 56°20′N 38°35′E
- Country: Russia
- Region: Vladimir Oblast
- District: Alexandrovsky District
- Time zone: UTC+3:00

Bukhary (Russian: Бухары) is a rural locality (a village) in Karinskoye Rural Settlement, Alexandrovsky District, Vladimir Oblast, Russia. The population was 159 as of 2010. There are 4 streets.

== Geography ==
Bukhary is located 13 km southwest of Alexandrov (the district's administrative centre) by road. Daryino is the nearest rural locality.
