= Kashino, Alexandrovsky District, Vladimir Oblast =

Kashino Кашино
- Village
- Location within Vladimir Oblast Location within Russia
- Coordinates: 56°23′N 38°33′E
- Country: Russia
- Region: Vladimir Oblast
- District: Alexandrovsky District
- Time zone: UTC+3:00

Kashino (Russian: Кашино) is a rural locality (a village) in Slednevskoye Rural Settlement, Alexandrovsky District, Vladimir Oblast, Russia. The population was 7 as of 2010. There are 5 streets.

== Geography ==
Kashino is located on the Seraya River, 16 km west of Alexandrov (the district's administrative centre) by road. Sokolovo is the nearest rural locality.
