= Isayevka =

Isayevka Исаевка
- Village
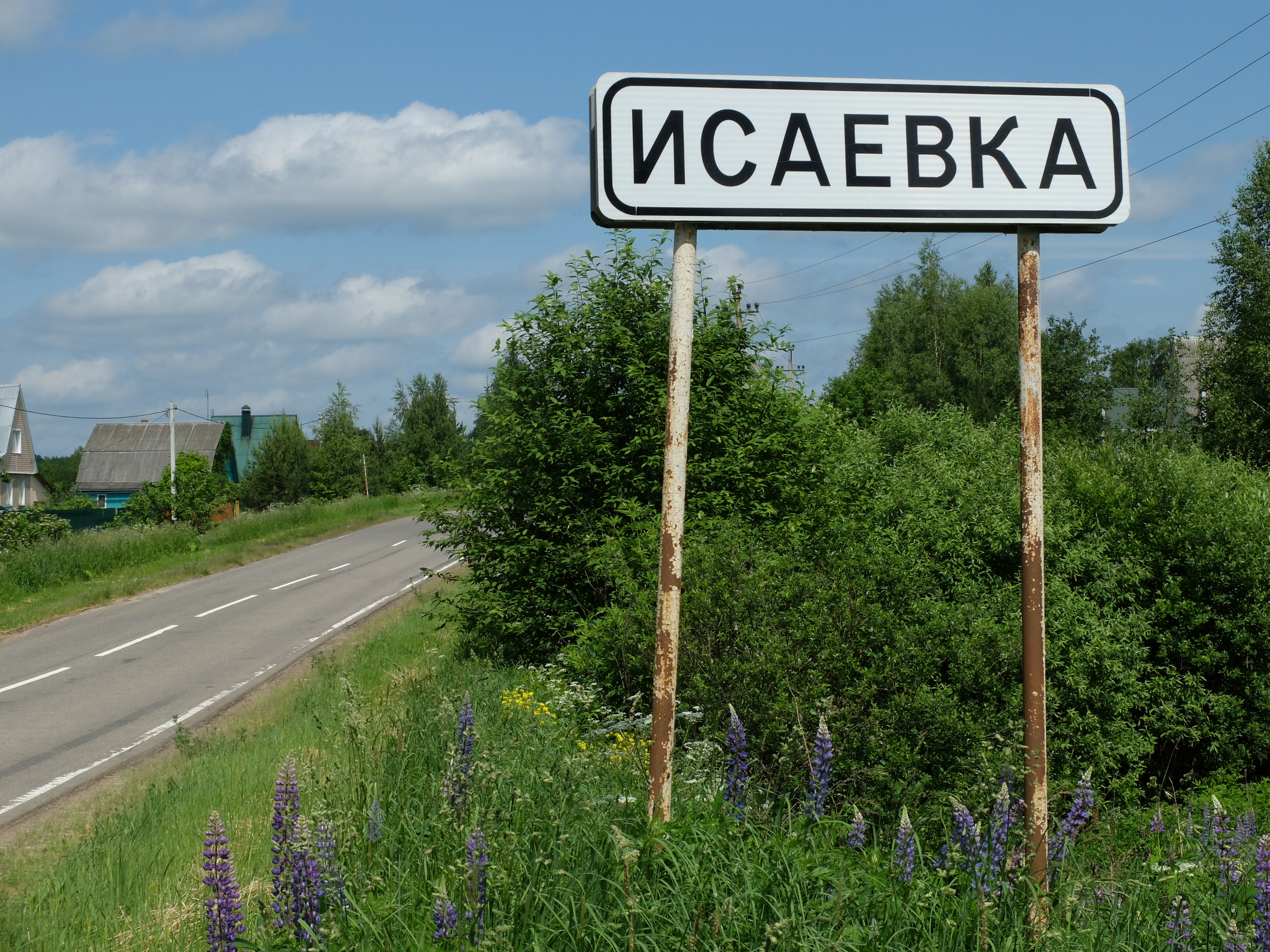

- Location within Vladimir Oblast Location within Russia
- Coordinates: 56°28′N 38°42′E
- Country: Russia
- Region: Vladimir Oblast
- District: Alexandrovsky District
- Time zone: UTC+3:00

Isayevka (Russian: Исаевка) is a rural locality (a village) in Slednevskoye Rural Settlement, Alexandrovsky District, Vladimir Oblast, Russia. The population was 9 as of 2010. There are 2 streets.

== Geography ==
Isayevka is located 12 km north of Alexandrov (the district's administrative centre) by road. Baksheyevo is the nearest rural locality.
