= Koptsevo =

Koptsevo Копцево
- Village
- Location within Vladimir Oblast Location within Russia
- Coordinates: 56°23′N 38°33′E
- Country: Russia
- Region: Vladimir Oblast
- District: Alexandrovsky District
- Time zone: UTC+3:00

Koptsevo (Russian: Копцево) is a rural locality (a village) in Slednevskoye Rural Settlement, Alexandrovsky District, Vladimir Oblast, Russia. The population was 46 as of 2010. There are 2 streets.

== Geography ==
Koptsevo is located on the Gorely Krest River, 16 km west of Alexandrov (the district's administrative centre) by road. Strunino is the nearest rural locality.
