= Ryabinino, Alexandrovsky District, Vladimir Oblast =

Ryabinino Рябинино
- Village
- Location within Vladimir Oblast Location within Russia
- Coordinates: 56°26′N 39°08′E
- Country: Russia
- Region: Vladimir Oblast
- District: Alexandrovsky District
- Time zone: UTC+3:00

Ryabinino (Russian: Рябинино) is a rural locality (a village) in Andreyevskoye Rural Settlement, Alexandrovsky District, Vladimir Oblast, Russia. The population was 2 as of 2010.

== Geography ==
Ryabinino is located 29 km northeast of Alexandrov (the district's administrative centre) by road. Demyanovo is the nearest rural locality.
