= Ryuminskoye =

Ryuminskoye Рюминское
- Selo
- Location within Vladimir Oblast Location within Russia
- Coordinates: 56°31′N 38°46′E
- Country: Russia
- Region: Vladimir Oblast
- District: Alexandrovsky District
- Time zone: UTC+3:00

Ryuminskoye (Russian: Рюминское) is a rural locality (a selo) in Slednevskoye Rural Settlement, Alexandrovsky District, Vladimir Oblast, Russia. The population was 17 as of 2010. There are 4 streets.

== Geography ==
Ryuminskoye is located 22 km north of Alexandrov (the district's administrative centre) by road. Kopylikha is the nearest rural locality.
