= Maloye Mikhalyovo =

Maloye Mikhalyovo Малое Михалёво
- Village
- Location within Vladimir Oblast Location within Russia
- Coordinates: 56°37′N 38°23′E
- Country: Russia
- Region: Vladimir Oblast
- District: Alexandrovsky District
- Time zone: UTC+3:00

Maloye Mikhalyovo (Russian: Малое Михалёво) is a rural locality (a village) in Krasnoplamenskoye Rural Settlement, Alexandrovsky District, Vladimir Oblast, Russia. The population was 7 as of 2010. There is one street.

== Geography ==
Maloye Mikhalyovo is located 61 km northwest of Alexandrov (the district's administrative centre) by road. Bolshoye Mikhalyovo is the nearest rural locality.
