= Aleksino, Alexandrovsky District, Vladimir Oblast =

Aleksino Алексино
- Village
- Location within Vladimir Oblast Location within Russia
- Coordinates: 56°14′N 38°30′E
- Country: Russia
- Region: Vladimir Oblast
- District: Alexandrovsky District
- Time zone: UTC+3:00

Aleksino (Russian: Алексино) is a rural locality (a village) in Karinskoye Rural Settlement, Alexandrovsky District, Vladimir Oblast, Russia. The population was 24 as of 2010. There are 4 streets.

== Geography ==
Aleksino is located 35 km southwest of Alexandrov (the district's administrative centre) by road. Novozhilovo is the nearest rural locality.
