= Lukyantsevo =

Lukyantsevo Лукьянцево
- Village
- Location within Vladimir Oblast Location within Russia
- Coordinates: 56°30′N 38°42′E
- Country: Russia
- Region: Vladimir Oblast
- District: Alexandrovsky District
- Time zone: UTC+3:00

Lukyantsevo (Russian: Лукьянцево) is a rural locality (a village) in Slednevskoye Rural Settlement, Alexandrovsky District, Vladimir Oblast, Russia. The population was 97 as of 2010. There is 1 street.

== Geography ==
Lukyantsevo is located 15 km north of Alexandrov (the district's administrative centre) by road. Isayevka is the nearest rural locality.
