= Grigorovo, Krasnoplamenskoye Rural Settlement, Alexandrovsky District, Vladimir Oblast =

Village in Vladimir Oblast, Russia

Grigorovo Григорово
- Village
- Location within Vladimir Oblast Location within Russia
- Coordinates: 56°38′N 38°23′E
- Country: Russia
- Region: Vladimir Oblast
- District: Alexandrovsky District
- Time zone: UTC+3:00

Grigorovo (Russian: Григорово) is a rural locality (a village) in Krasnoplamenskoye Rural Settlement, Alexandrovsky District, Vladimir Oblast, Russia. The population was 1 as of 2010.

== Geography ==
The village is located 17 km north-west from Krasnoye Plamya, 43 km north-west from Alexandrov.
