= Bolshoye Marinkino =

Bolshoye Marinkino Большое Маринкино
- Village
- Location within Vladimir Oblast Location within Russia
- Coordinates: 56°20′N 38°55′E
- Country: Russia
- Region: Vladimir Oblast
- District: Alexandrovsky District
- Time zone: UTC+3:00

Bolshoye Marinkino (Russian: Большо́е Мари́нкино) is a rural locality (a village) in Andreyevskoye Rural Settlement, Alexandrovsky District, Vladimir Oblast, Russia. The population was 6 as of 2010.

== Geography ==
Bolshoye Marinkino is located 15 km southeast of Alexandrov (the district's administrative centre) by road. Maloye Marinkino is the nearest rural locality.
