= Stepkovo =

Stepkovo Степково
- Village
- Location within Vladimir Oblast Location within Russia
- Coordinates: 56°19′N 38°44′E
- Country: Russia
- Region: Vladimir Oblast
- District: Alexandrovsky District
- Time zone: UTC+3:00

Stepkovo (Russian: Степково) is a rural locality (a village) in Karinskoye Rural Settlement, Alexandrovsky District, Vladimir Oblast, Russia. The population was 116 as of 2010. There are 4 streets.

== Geography ==
Stepkovo is located on the Seraya River, 13 km south of Alexandrov (the district's administrative centre) by road. Karabanovo is the nearest rural locality.
