= Podvyazye =

Podvyazye Подвязье
- Village
- Location within Vladimir Oblast Location within Russia
- Coordinates: 56°32′N 39°12′E
- Country: Russia
- Region: Vladimir Oblast
- District: Alexandrovsky District
- Time zone: UTC+3:00

Podvyazye (Russian: Подвязье) is a rural locality (a village) in Andreyevskoye Rural Settlement, Alexandrovsky District, Vladimir Oblast, Russia. The population was 81 as of 2010.

== Geography ==
Podvyazye is located 40 km northeast of Alexandrov (the district's administrative centre) by road. Spornovo is the nearest rural locality.
