= Bakino =

Bakino Бакино
- Village
- Location within Vladimir Oblast Location within Russia
- Coordinates: 56°20′N 38°58′E
- Country: Russia
- Region: Vladimir Oblast
- District: Alexandrovsky District
- Time zone: UTC+3:00

Bakino (Russian: Бакино) is a rural locality (a village) in Andreyevskoye Rural Settlement, Alexandrovsky District, Vladimir Oblast, Russia. The population was 112 as of 2010. There are 7 streets.

== Geography ==
Bakino is located 19 km southeast of Alexandrov (the district's administrative centre) by road. Ryasnitsyno is the nearest rural locality.
