= Mayak, Vladimir Oblast =

Mayak Маяк
- Settlement
- Location within Vladimir Oblast Location within Russia
- Coordinates: 56°22′N 38°48′E
- Country: Russia
- Region: Vladimir Oblast
- District: Alexandrovsky District
- Time zone: UTC+3:00

Mayak (Russian: Маяк) is a rural locality (a settlement) in Andreyevskoye Rural Settlement, Alexandrovsky District, Vladimir Oblast, Russia. The population was 166 as of 2010. There are 16 streets.

== Geography ==
Mayak is located 6 km southeast of Alexandrov (the district's administrative centre) by road. Yelkino is the nearest rural locality.
