= Belteyevka =

Belteyevka Бельтеевка
- Village
- Location within Vladimir Oblast Location within Russia
- Coordinates: 56°20′N 38°52′E
- Country: Russia
- Region: Vladimir Oblast
- District: Alexandrovsky District
- Time zone: UTC+3:00

Belteyevka (Russian: Бельте́евка) is a rural locality (a village) in Andreyevskoye Rural Settlement, Alexandrovsky District, Vladimir Oblast, Russia. The population was 5 as of 2010.

== Geography ==
Belteyevka is located 12 km southeast of Alexandrov (the district's administrative centre) by road. Fyodorovskoye is the nearest rural locality.
