= Bolshoye Shimonovo =

Bolshoye Shimonovo Большое Шимоново
- Village
- Location within Vladimir Oblast Location within Russia
- Coordinates: 56°19′N 38°52′E
- Country: Russia
- Region: Vladimir Oblast
- District: Alexandrovsky District
- Time zone: UTC+3:00

Bolshoye Shimonovo (Russian: Большое Шимоново) is a rural locality (a village) in Karinskoye Rural Settlement, Alexandrovsky District, Vladimir Oblast, Russia. The population was 29 as of 2010. There are 3 streets.

== Geography ==
Bolshoye Shimonovo is located 14 km southeast of Alexandrov (the district's administrative centre) by road. Maloye Shimonovo is the nearest rural locality.
