= Maryonkino =

Maryonkino Марёнкино
- Village
- Location within Vladimir Oblast Location within Russia
- Coordinates: 56°12′N 38°31′E
- Country: Russia
- Region: Vladimir Oblast
- District: Alexandrovsky District
- Time zone: UTC+3:00

Maryonkino (Russian: Марёнкино) is a rural locality (a village) in Karinskoye Rural Settlement, Alexandrovsky District, Vladimir Oblast, Russia. The population was 21 as of 2010. There are 12 streets.

== Geography ==
Maryonkino is located 39 km southwest of Alexandrov (the district's administrative centre) by road. Afanasovo is the nearest rural locality.
