= Mayovka, Vladimir Oblast =

Mayovka Маёвка
- Settlement
- Location within Vladimir Oblast Location within Russia
- Coordinates: 56°31′N 38°29′E
- Country: Russia
- Region: Vladimir Oblast
- District: Alexandrovsky District
- Time zone: UTC+3:00

Mayovka (Russian: Маёвка) is a rural locality (a settlement) in Krasnoplamenskoye Rural Settlement, Alexandrovsky District, Vladimir Oblast, Russia. The population was 62 as of 2010. There are 4 streets.

== Geography ==
Mayovka is located 36 km northwest of Alexandrov (the district's administrative centre) by road. Tiribrovo is the nearest rural locality.
