= Ivankovo, Alexandrovsky District, Vladimir Oblast =

Ivankovo Иваньково
- Village
- Location within Vladimir Oblast Location within Russia
- Coordinates: 56°24′N 38°27′E
- Country: Russia
- Region: Vladimir Oblast
- District: Alexandrovsky District
- Time zone: UTC+3:00

Ivankovo (Russian: Иваньково) is a rural locality (a village) in Slednevskoye Rural Settlement, Alexandrovsky District, Vladimir Oblast, Russia. The population was 94 as of 2010. There are 6 streets.

== Geography ==
Ivankovo is located 22 km west of Alexandrov (the district's administrative centre) by road. Arsaki is the nearest rural locality.
