= Starovo, Alexandrovsky District, Vladimir Oblast =

Starovo Старово
- Village
- Location within Vladimir Oblast Location within Russia
- Coordinates: 56°16′N 38°50′E
- Country: Russia
- Region: Vladimir Oblast
- District: Alexandrovsky District
- Time zone: UTC+3:00

Starovo (Russian: Старово) is a rural locality (a village) in Karinskoye Rural Settlement, Alexandrovsky District, Vladimir Oblast, Russia. The population was 2 as of 2010. There is 1 street.

== Geography ==
Starovo is located on the Maly Kirzhach River, 21 km southeast of Alexandrov (the district's administrative centre) by road. Dubki is the nearest rural locality.
