= Shushkovo =

Shushkovo Шушково
- Village
- Location within Vladimir Oblast Location within Russia
- Coordinates: 56°30′N 39°09′E
- Country: Russia
- Region: Vladimir Oblast
- District: Alexandrovsky District
- Time zone: UTC+3:00

Shushkovo (Russian: Шушково) is a rural locality (a village) in Andreyevskoye Rural Settlement, Alexandrovsky District, Vladimir Oblast, Russia. The population was 7 as of 2010.

== Geography ==
Shushkovo is located 36 km northeast of Alexandrov (the district's administrative centre) by road. Vysokovo is the nearest rural locality.
