= Malye Vyoski =

Malye Vyoski Малые Вёски
- Village
- Location within Vladimir Oblast Location within Russia
- Coordinates: 56°31′N 39°03′E
- Country: Russia
- Region: Vladimir Oblast
- District: Alexandrovsky District
- Time zone: UTC+3:00

Malye Vyoski (Russian: Малые Вёски) is a rural locality (a village) in Andreyevskoye Rural Settlement, Alexandrovsky District, Vladimir Oblast, Russia. The population was 10 as of 2010.

== Geography ==
Malye Vyoski is located 31 km northeast of Alexandrov (the district's administrative centre) by road. Bolshiye Vyoski is the nearest rural locality.
