= Konishchevo =

Konishchevo Конищево
- Village
- Location within Vladimir Oblast Location within Russia
- Coordinates: 56°34′N 38°32′E
- Country: Russia
- Region: Vladimir Oblast
- District: Alexandrovsky District
- Time zone: UTC+3:00

Konishchevo (Russian: Конищево) is a rural locality (a village) in Krasnoplamenskoye Rural Settlement, Alexandrovsky District, Vladimir Oblast, Russia. There is 1 street. The population was 1 as of the 2010 census.

== Geography ==
Konishchevo is located 43 km northwest of Alexandrov (the district's administrative centre) by road. Krasnoye Plamya is the nearest rural locality.
