= Stepanikha (Andreyevskoye Rural Settlement), Alexandrovsky District, Vladimir Oblast =

Stepanikha Степаниха
- Village
- Location within Vladimir Oblast Location within Russia
- Coordinates: 56°27′N 38°54′E
- Country: Russia
- Region: Vladimir Oblast
- District: Alexandrovsky District
- Time zone: UTC+3:00

Stepanikha (Russian: Степаниха) is a rural locality (a village) in Andreyevskoye Rural Settlement, Alexandrovsky District, Vladimir Oblast, Russia. The population was 2 as of 2010.

== Geography ==
The village is located 17 km north-east from Alexandrov.
