= Maloye Karinskoye =

Maloye Karinskoye Малое Каринское
- Village
- Location within Vladimir Oblast Location within Russia
- Coordinates: 56°21′N 38°37′E
- Country: Russia
- Region: Vladimir Oblast
- District: Alexandrovsky District
- Time zone: UTC+3:00

Maloye Karinskoye (Russian: Малое Каринское) is a rural locality (a village) in Karinskoye Rural Settlement, Alexandrovsky District, Vladimir Oblast, Russia. The population was 8 in 2010. There are three streets.

== Geography ==
Maloye Karinskoye is located on the Pichkura River, 11 km southwest of Alexandrov (the district's administrative centre) by road. Bolshoye Karinskoye is the nearest rural locality.
