= Khoroshevo, Alexandrovsky District, Vladimir Oblast =

Khoroshevo Хорошево
- Village
- Location within Vladimir Oblast Location within Russia
- Coordinates: 56°33′N 38°30′E
- Country: Russia
- Region: Vladimir Oblast
- District: Alexandrovsky District
- Time zone: UTC+3:00

Khoroshevo (Russian: Хорошево) is a rural locality (a village) in Krasnoplamenskoye Rural Settlement, Alexandrovsky District, Vladimir Oblast, Russia. The population was 13 as of 2010. There is 1 street.

== Geography ==
Khoroshevo is located 44 km northwest of Alexandrov (the district's administrative centre) by road. Krasnoye Plamya is the nearest rural locality.
