= Novovoskresenskoye =

Novovoskresenskoye Нововоскресенское
- Village
- Location within Vladimir Oblast Location within Russia
- Coordinates: 56°17′N 38°28′E
- Country: Russia
- Region: Vladimir Oblast
- District: Alexandrovsky District
- Time zone: UTC+3:00

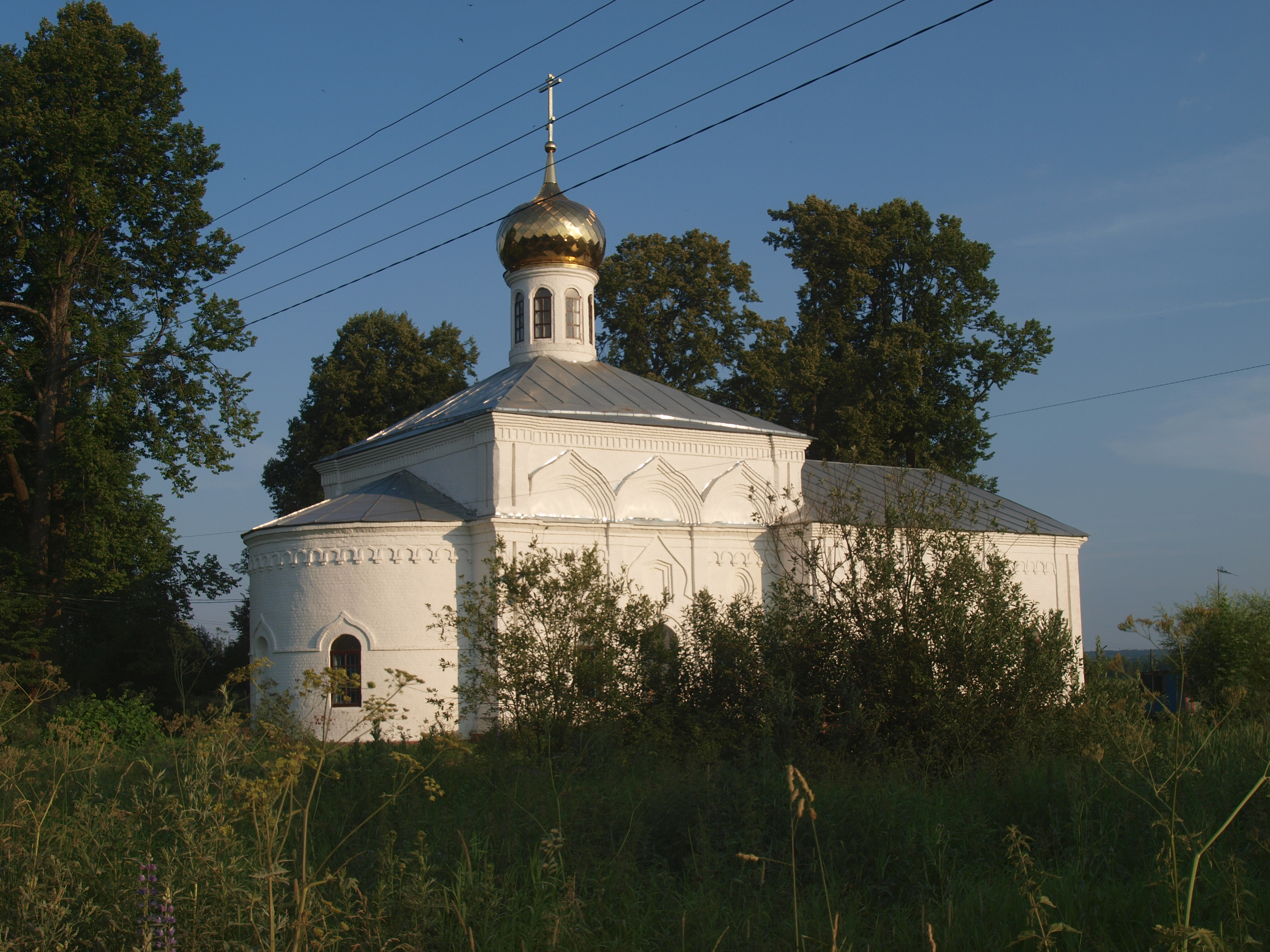
Resurrection of Jesus Church in Novoskresenskoe village, Vladimir oblast, Russia

Novovoskresenskoye (Russian: Нововоскресенское) is a rural locality (a village) in Karinskoye Rural Settlement, Alexandrovsky District, Vladimir Oblast, Russia. The population was 21 as of 2010. There are 12 streets.

== Geography ==
Novovoskresenskoye is located 27 km southwest of Alexandrov (the district's administrative centre) by road. Lizunovo is the nearest rural locality.
