= Obashevo =

Obashevo Обашево
- Village
- Location within Vladimir Oblast Location within Russia
- Coordinates: 56°37′N 38°29′E
- Country: Russia
- Region: Vladimir Oblast
- District: Alexandrovsky District
- Time zone: UTC+3:00

Obashevo (Russian: Обашево) is a rural locality (a village) in Krasnoplamenskoye Rural Settlement, Alexandrovsky District, Vladimir Oblast, Russia. The population was 202 as of 2010. There are 4 streets.

== Geography ==
Obashevo is located 50 km northwest of Alexandrov (the district's administrative centre) by road. Klenovka is the nearest rural locality.
