= Ploshchevo =

Ploshchevo Площево
- Village
- Location within Vladimir Oblast Location within Russia
- Coordinates: 56°15′N 38°27′E
- Country: Russia
- Region: Vladimir Oblast
- District: Alexandrovsky District
- Time zone: UTC+3:00

Ploshchevo (Russian: Площево) is a rural locality (a village) in Karinskoye Rural Settlement, Alexandrovsky District, Vladimir Oblast, Russia. The population was 26 as of 2010. There are five streets.

== Geography ==
Ploshchevo is located 31 km southwest of Alexandrov (the district's administrative centre) by road. Zhabrevo is the nearest rural locality.
