= Grigorovo, Slednevskoye Rural Settlement, Alexandrovsky District, Vladimir Oblast =

Village in Vladimir Oblast, Russia

Grigorovo Григорово
- Village
- Location within Vladimir Oblast Location within Russia
- Coordinates: 56°27′N 38°48′E
- Country: Russia
- Region: Vladimir Oblast
- District: Alexandrovsky District
- Time zone: UTC+3:00

Grigorovo (Russian: Григорово) is a rural locality (a village) in Slednevskoye Rural Settlement, Alexandrovsky District, Vladimir Oblast, Russia. The population was 3 as of 2010.

== Geography ==
The village is located on the Seraya River, 18 km north-east from Slednevo, 10 km north-east from Alexandrov.
