= Godunovo =

Godunovo Годуново
- Selo
- Location within Vladimir Oblast Location within Russia
- Coordinates: 56°29′N 39°02′E
- Country: Russia
- Region: Vladimir Oblast
- District: Alexandrovsky District
- Time zone: UTC+3:00

Godunovo (Russian: Годуново) is a rural locality (a selo) in Andreyevskoye Rural Settlement, Alexandrovsky District, Vladimir Oblast, Russia. The population was 692 as of 2010. There are 13 streets.

== Geography ==
Godunovo is located 25 km northeast of Alexandrov (the district's administrative centre) by road. Prechistino is the nearest rural locality.
