= Zhabrevo =

Zhabrevo Жабрево
- Village
- Location within Vladimir Oblast Location within Russia
- Coordinates: 56°15′N 38°28′E
- Country: Russia
- Region: Vladimir Oblast
- District: Alexandrovsky District
- Time zone: UTC+3:00

Zhabrevo (Russian: Жабрево) is a rural locality (a village) in Karinskoye Rural Settlement, Alexandrovsky District, Vladimir Oblast, Russia. The population was 32 as of 2010. There are 6 streets.

== Geography ==
Zhabrevo is located 30 km southwest of Alexandrov (the district's administrative centre) by road. Ploshchevo is the nearest rural locality.
