= Klenovka, Vladimir Oblast =

Klenovka Кленовка
- Village
- Location within Vladimir Oblast Location within Russia
- Coordinates: 56°37′N 38°28′E
- Country: Russia
- Region: Vladimir Oblast
- District: Alexandrovsky District
- Time zone: UTC+3:00

Klenovka (Russian: Кленовка) is a rural locality (a village) in Krasnoplamenskoye Rural Settlement, Alexandrovsky District, Vladimir Oblast, Russia. The population was 3 as of 2010. There is 1 street.

== Geography ==
Klenovka is located 51 km northwest of Alexandrov (the district's administrative centre) by road. Obashevo is the nearest rural locality.
