= Bolshoye Mikhalyovo =

Bolshoye Mikhalyovo Большое Михалёво
- Village
- Location within Vladimir Oblast Location within Russia
- Coordinates: 56°37′N 38°22′E
- Country: Russia
- Region: Vladimir Oblast
- District: Alexandrovsky District
- Time zone: UTC+3:00

Bolshoye Mikhalyovo (Russian: Большо́е Михалёво) is a rural locality (a village) in Krasnoplamenskoye Rural Settlement, Alexandrovsky District, Vladimir Oblast, Russia. The population was 5 as of 2010. There is 1 street.

== Geography ==
Bolshoye Mikhalyovo is located 60 km northwest of Alexandrov (the district's administrative centre) by road. Maloye Mikhalyovo is the nearest rural locality.
