= Vyalkovka =

Vyalkovka Вяльковка
- Village
- Location within Vladimir Oblast Location within Russia
- Coordinates: 56°23′N 38°54′E
- Country: Russia
- Region: Vladimir Oblast
- District: Alexandrovsky District
- Time zone: UTC+3:00

Vyalkovka (Russian: Вяльковка) is a rural locality (a village) in Andreyevskoye Rural Settlement, Alexandrovsky District, Vladimir Oblast, Russia. The population was 6 as of 2010. There are 2 streets.

== Geography ==
Vyalkovka is located 12 km east of Alexandrov (the district's administrative centre) by road. Aksyonovka is the nearest rural locality.
