= Dolgopolye =

Dolgopolye Долгополье
- Selo
- Location within Vladimir Oblast Location within Russia
- Coordinates: 56°31′N 39°13′E
- Country: Russia
- Region: Vladimir Oblast
- District: Alexandrovsky District
- Time zone: UTC+3:00

Dolgopolye (Russian: Долгополье) is a rural locality (a selo) in Andreyevskoye Rural Settlement, Alexandrovsky District, Vladimir Oblast, Russia. The population was 23 as of 2010.

== Geography ==
Dolgopolye is located 40 km northeast of Alexandrov (the district's administrative centre) by road. Spornovo is the nearest rural locality.
