= Maloye Shimonovo =

Maloye Shimonovo Малое Шимоново
- Village
- Location within Vladimir Oblast Location within Russia
- Coordinates: 56°18′N 38°52′E
- Country: Russia
- Region: Vladimir Oblast
- District: Alexandrovsky District
- Time zone: UTC+3:00

Maloye Shimonovo (Russian: Малое Шимоново) is a rural locality (a village) in Karinskoye Rural Settlement, Alexandrovsky District, Vladimir Oblast, Russia. The population was 2 as of 2010. There is 1 street.

== Geography ==
Maloye Shimonovo is located on the Maly Kirzhach River, 15 km (9.3 mi) southeast of Alexandrov (the district's administrative centre) by road. Bolshoye Shimonovo is the nearest rural locality.
