= Posyolok Torfopredpriyatiya =

Posyolok Torfopredpriyatiya Посёлок Торфопредприятия
- Settlement
- Location within Vladimir Oblast Location within Russia
- Coordinates: 56°16′N 38°41′E
- Country: Russia
- Region: Vladimir Oblast
- District: Alexandrovsky District
- Time zone: UTC+3:00

Posyolok Torfopredpriyatiya (Russian: Посёлок Торфопредприятия) is a rural locality (a settlement) in Karinskoye Rural Settlement, Alexandrovsky District, Vladimir Oblast, Russia. The population was 10 as of 2010. There is 1 street.

== Geography ==
The settlement is located 16 km south of Alexandrov (the district's administrative centre) by road. Rykulino is the nearest rural locality.
