= Moshnino =

Moshnino Мошнино
- Selo
- Location within Vladimir Oblast Location within Russia
- Coordinates: 56°27′N 38°50′E
- Country: Russia
- Region: Vladimir Oblast
- District: Alexandrovsky District
- Time zone: UTC+3:00

Moshnino (Russian: Мошнино) is a rural locality (a selo) in Slednevskoye Rural Settlement, Alexandrovsky District, Vladimir Oblast, Russia. The population was 136 as of 2010. There are 2 streets.

== Geography ==
Moshnino is located 11 km northeast of Alexandrov (the district's administrative centre) by road. Sivkovo is the nearest rural locality.
