= Shimokhtino =

Shimokhtino Шимохтино
- Selo
- Location within Vladimir Oblast Location within Russia
- Coordinates: 56°23′N 39°07′E
- Country: Russia
- Region: Vladimir Oblast
- District: Alexandrovsky District
- Time zone: UTC+3:00

Shimokhtino (Russian: Шимохтино) is a rural locality (a selo) in Andreyevskoye Rural Settlement, Alexandrovsky District, Vladimir Oblast, Russia. The population was 12 as of 2010.

== Geography ==
Shimokhtino is located on the Bolshoy Kirzhach River, 26 km east of Alexandrov (the district's administrative centre) by road. Osino is the nearest rural locality.
