= Krasnaya Roshcha =

Krasnaya Roshcha Красная Роща
- Village
- Location within Vladimir Oblast Location within Russia
- Coordinates: 56°24′N 38°44′E
- Country: Russia
- Region: Vladimir Oblast
- District: Alexandrovsky District
- Time zone: UTC+3:00

Krasnaya Roshcha (Russian: Красная Роща) is a rural locality (a village) in Slednevskoye Rural Settlement, Alexandrovsky District, Vladimir Oblast, Russia. The population was 55 as of 2010. There are 2 streets.

== Geography ==
The village is located 3 km north-east from Alexandrov.
