= Shikhovo, Vladimir Oblast =

Shikhovo Шихово
- Village
- Location within Vladimir Oblast Location within Russia
- Coordinates: 56°25′N 39°07′E
- Country: Russia
- Region: Vladimir Oblast
- District: Alexandrovsky District
- Time zone: UTC+3:00

Shikhovo (Russian: Шихово) is a rural locality (a village) in Andreyevskoye Rural Settlement, Alexandrovsky District, Vladimir Oblast, Russia. The population was 4 as of 2010.

== Geography ==
Shikhovo is located 28 km east of Alexandrov (the district's administrative centre) by road. Klemyachevo is the nearest rural locality.
