= Malinovo, Alexandrovsky District, Vladimir Oblast =

Malinovo Малиново
- Village
- Location within Vladimir Oblast Location within Russia
- Coordinates: 56°15′N 38°43′E
- Country: Russia
- Region: Vladimir Oblast
- District: Alexandrovsky District
- Time zone: UTC+3:00

Malinovo (Russian: Малиново) is a rural locality (a village) in Karinskoye Rural Settlement, Alexandrovsky District, Vladimir Oblast, Russia. The population was 6 as of 2010. There is 1 street.

== Geography ==
Malinovo is located on the bank of the Molokcha River, 20 km south of Alexandrov (the district's administrative centre) by road. Afonasovo is the nearest rural locality.
