= Yelovki =

Yelovki Еловки
- Village
- Location within Vladimir Oblast Location within Russia
- Coordinates: 56°30′N 38°59′E
- Country: Russia
- Region: Vladimir Oblast
- District: Alexandrovsky District
- Time zone: UTC+3:00

Yelovki (Russian: Еловки) is a rural locality (a village) in Andreyevskoye Rural Settlement, Alexandrovsky District, Vladimir Oblast, Russia. The population was 1 in 2010.

== Geography ==
Yelovki is located 27 kilometres (17 mi) northeast of Alexandrov (the district's administrative centre) by road. Godunovo is the nearest rural locality.
