= Brykovy Gory =

Brykovy Gory Брыковы Горы
- Village
- Location within Vladimir Oblast Location within Russia
- Coordinates: 56°25′N 38°27′E
- Country: Russia
- Region: Vladimir Oblast
- District: Alexandrovsky District
- Time zone: UTC+3:00

Brykovy Gory (Russian: Бры́ковы Го́ры) is a rural locality (a village) in Slednevskoye Rural Settlement, Alexandrovsky District, Vladimir Oblast, Russia. The population was 36 as of 2010. There are 5 streets.

== Geography ==
Brykovy Gory is located 19 km west of Alexandrov (the district's administrative centre) by road. Polinosovo is the nearest rural locality.
