= Sushchyovo =

Sushchyovo Сущёво
- Village
- Location within Vladimir Oblast Location within Russia
- Coordinates: 56°30′N 38°20′E
- Country: Russia
- Region: Vladimir Oblast
- District: Alexandrovsky District
- Time zone: UTC+3:00

Sushchyovo (Russian: Сущёво) is a rural locality (a village) in Krasnoplamenskoye Rural Settlement, Alexandrovsky District, Vladimir Oblast, Russia. The population was 3 as of 2010. There is 1 street.

== Geography ==
Sushchyovo is located 31 km northwest of Alexandrov (the district's administrative centre) by road. Mukhanovo is the nearest rural locality.
