= Petrakovo =

Petrakovo Петраково
- Village
- Location within Vladimir Oblast Location within Russia
- Coordinates: 56°17′N 38°52′E
- Country: Russia
- Region: Vladimir Oblast
- District: Alexandrovsky District
- Time zone: UTC+3:00

Petrakovo (Russian: Петрако́во) is a rural locality (a village) in Karinskoye Rural Settlement, Alexandrovsky District, Vladimir Oblast, Russia. The population was 8 as of 2010. There are 2 streets.

== Geography ==
Petrakovo is located on the Maly Kirzhach River, 23 km southeast of Alexandrov (the district's administrative centre) by road. Romanovskoye is the nearest rural locality.
