= Ivanovo-Sobolevo =

Ivanovo-Sobolevo Иваново-Соболево
- Village
- Location within Vladimir Oblast Location within Russia
- Coordinates: 56°23′N 38°51′E
- Country: Russia
- Region: Vladimir Oblast
- District: Alexandrovsky District
- Time zone: UTC+3:00

Ivanovo-Sobolevo (Russian: Иваново-Соболево) is a rural locality (a village) in Andreyevskoye Rural Settlement, Alexandrovsky District, Vladimir Oblast, Russia. The population was 40 as of 2010. There are 10 streets.

== Geography ==
Ivanovo-Sobolevo is located 9 km east of Alexandrov (the district's administrative centre) by road. Volodino is the nearest rural locality.
