= Chislavl =

Chislavl Числавль
- Village
- Location within Vladimir Oblast Location within Russia
- Coordinates: 56°28′N 39°07′E
- Country: Russia
- Region: Vladimir Oblast
- District: Alexandrovsky District
- Time zone: UTC+3:00

Chislavl (Russian: Числавль) is a rural locality (a village) in Andreyevskoye Rural Settlement, Alexandrovsky District, Vladimir Oblast, Russia. The population was 5 as of 2010.

== Geography ==
Chislavl is located 35 km northeast of Alexandrov (the district's administrative centre) by road. Chetvert is the nearest rural locality.
