= Kopylikha =

Kopylikha Копылиха
- Village
- Location within Vladimir Oblast Location within Russia
- Coordinates: 56°32′N 38°48′E
- Country: Russia
- Region: Vladimir Oblast
- District: Alexandrovsky District
- Time zone: UTC+3:00

Kopylikha (Russian: Копылиха) is a rural locality (a village) in Slednevskoye Rural Settlement, Alexandrovsky District, Vladimir Oblast, Russia. The population was 6 as of 2010.

== Geography ==
Kopylikha is located 24 km north of Alexandrov (the district's administrative centre) by road. Ryuminskoye is the nearest rural locality.
