= Alabukhino =

Alabukhino Алабухино
- Village
- Location within Vladimir Oblast Location within Russia
- Coordinates: 56°18′N 38°47′E
- Country: Russia
- Region: Vladimir Oblast
- District: Alexandrovsky District
- Time zone: UTC+3:00

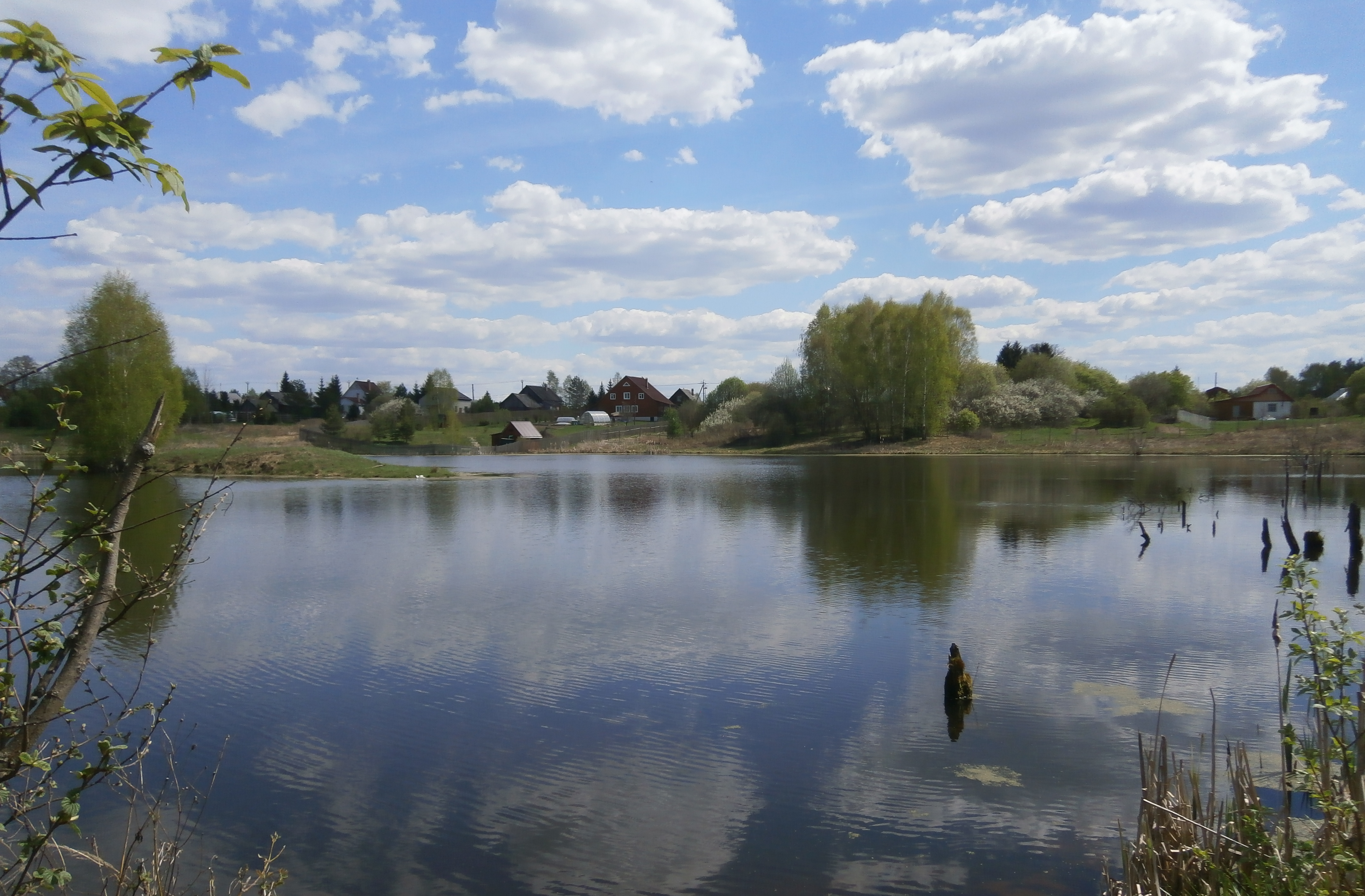
View of the village of Alabukhino.

Alabukhino (Russian: Ала́бухино) is a rural locality (a village) in Karinskoye Rural Settlement, Alexandrovsky District, Vladimir Oblast, Russia. The population was 7 as of 2010. There is 1 street.

== Geography ==
Alabukhino is located on the left bank of the Vzderinozhka River, 18 km southeast of Alexandrov (the district's administrative centre) by road. Kovedyayevo is the nearest rural locality.
