= Prokino, Vladimir Oblast =

Prokino Прокино
- Village
- Location within Vladimir Oblast Location within Russia
- Coordinates: 56°30′N 38°23′E
- Country: Russia
- Region: Vladimir Oblast
- District: Alexandrovsky District
- Time zone: UTC+3:00

Prokino (Russian: Прокино) is a rural locality (a village) in Krasnoplamenskoye Rural Settlement, Alexandrovsky District, Vladimir Oblast, Russia. The population was 4 as of 2010. There is 1 street.

== Geography ==
Prokino is located on the Dubna River, 33 km northwest of Alexandrov (the district's administrative centre) by road. Turgenevskiye dachi is the nearest rural locality.
