= Makhra =

Makhra Махра
- Selo
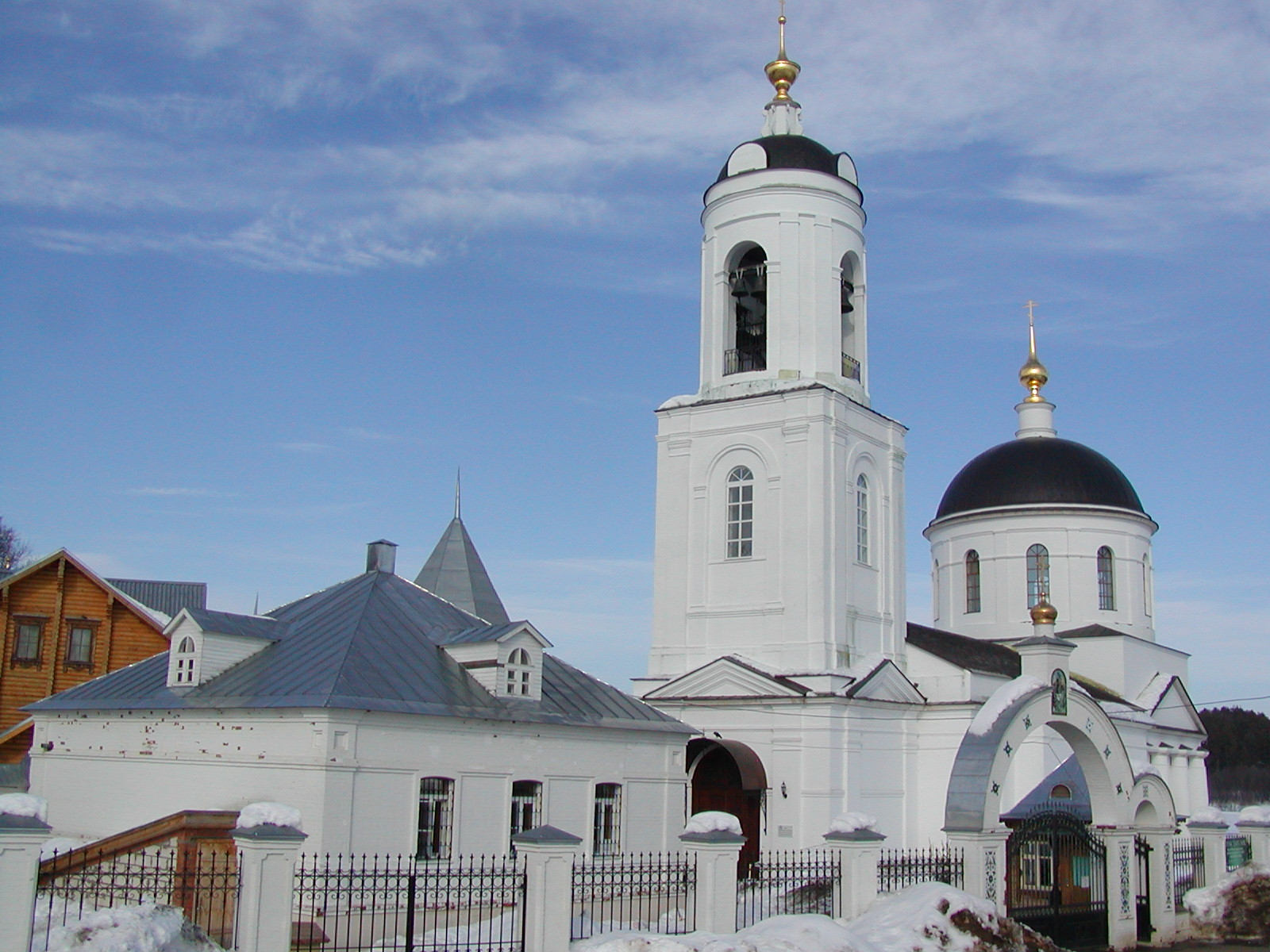
- Stefano-Makhrinsky Monastery

- Location within Vladimir Oblast Location within Russia
- Coordinates: 56°16′N 38°40′E
- Country: Russia
- Region: Vladimir Oblast
- District: Alexandrovsky District
- Time zone: UTC+3:00

Makhra (Russian: Махра) is a rural locality (a selo) in Karinskoye Rural Settlement, Alexandrovsky District, Vladimir Oblast, Russia. The population was 223 as of 2010. There are 15 streets.

== Geography ==
Makhra is located 17 km south of Alexandrov (the district's administrative centre) by road. Yurtsovo is the nearest rural locality.
