= Staraya Sloboda =

Staraya Sloboda (Russian: Старая Слобода) is the name of several rural localities in Russia:

- Staraya Sloboda, Kaluga Oblast, a village in Baryatinsky District of Kaluga Oblast
- Staraya Sloboda, Leningrad Oblast, a village in Yanegskoye Settlement Municipal Formation of Lodeynopolsky District in Leningrad Oblast
- Staraya Sloboda, Moscow Oblast, a village in Grebnevskoye Rural Settlement of Shchyolkovsky District in Moscow Oblast
- Staraya Sloboda, Smolensk Oblast, a village in Nikolskoye Rural Settlement of Gagarinsky District in Smolensk Oblast
- Staraya Sloboda, Vladimir Oblast, a selo in Alexandrovsky District of Vladimir Oblast
