= Bunkovo =

Bunkovo Буньково
- Village
- Location within Vladimir Oblast Location within Russia
- Coordinates: 56°20′N 39°02′E
- Country: Russia
- Region: Vladimir Oblast
- District: Alexandrovsky District
- Time zone: UTC+3:00

Bunkovo (Russian: Буньково) is a rural locality (a village) in Andreyevskoye Rural Settlement, Alexandrovsky District, Vladimir Oblast, Russia. The population was 4 as of 2010.

== Geography ==
Bunkovo is located 30 km southeast of Alexandrov (the district's administrative centre) by road. Bashkino is the nearest rural locality.
