= Perematkino =

Perematkino Перематкино
- Village
- Location within Vladimir Oblast Location within Russia
- Coordinates: 56°17′N 38°34′E
- Country: Russia
- Region: Vladimir Oblast
- District: Alexandrovsky District
- Time zone: UTC+3:00

Perematkino (Russian: Перематкино) is a rural locality (a village) in Karinskoye Rural Settlement, Alexandrovsky District, Vladimir Oblast, Russia. The population was 22 as of 2010. There are 5 streets.

== Geography ==
Perematkino is located on the Molokcha River, 33 km southwest of Alexandrov (the district's administrative centre) by road. Pesochnaya is the nearest rural locality.
