= Kulikovka =

Kulikovka Куликовка
- Village
- Location within Vladimir Oblast Location within Russia
- Coordinates: 56°27′N 39°09′E
- Country: Russia
- Region: Vladimir Oblast
- District: Alexandrovsky District
- Time zone: UTC+3:00

Kulikovka (Russian: Куликовка) is a rural locality (a village) in Andreyevskoye Rural Settlement, Alexandrovsky District, Vladimir Oblast, Russia. The population was 20 as of 2010. There is 1 street.

== Geography ==
Kulikovka is located 31 km northeast of Alexandrov (the district's administrative centre) by road. Chetvert is the nearest rural locality.
