= Komshilovo =

Komshilovo Комшилово
- Village
- Location within Vladimir Oblast Location within Russia
- Coordinates: 56°17′N 38°40′E
- Country: Russia
- Region: Vladimir Oblast
- District: Alexandrovsky District
- Time zone: UTC+3:00

Komshilovo (Russian: Комшилово) is a rural locality (a village) in Karinskoye Rural Settlement, Alexandrovsky District, Vladimir Oblast, Russia. The population was 22 as of 2010. There are 2 streets.

== Geography ==
Komshilovo is located 14 km south of Alexandrov (the district's administrative centre) by road. Karabanovo is the nearest rural locality.
