= Tirinovo =

Tirinovo Тириново
- Village
- Location within Vladimir Oblast Location within Russia
- Coordinates: 56°27′N 38°43′E
- Country: Russia
- Region: Vladimir Oblast
- District: Alexandrovsky District
- Time zone: UTC+3:00

Tirinovo (Russian: Тириново) is a rural locality (a village) in Slednevskoye Rural Settlement, Alexandrovsky District, Vladimir Oblast, Russia. The population was 12 as of 2010. There are 2 streets.

== Geography ==
Tirinovo is located 11 km north of Alexandrov (the district's administrative centre) by road. Novosyolka is the nearest rural locality.
