= Polinosovo =

Polinosovo Полиносово
- Village
- Location within Vladimir Oblast Location within Russia
- Coordinates: 56°24′N 38°25′E
- Country: Russia
- Region: Vladimir Oblast
- District: Alexandrovsky District
- Time zone: UTC+3:00

Polinosovo (Russian: Полиносово) is a rural locality (a village) in Slednevskoye Rural Settlement, Alexandrovsky District, Vladimir Oblast, Russia. The population was 9 as of 2010. There is 1 street.

== Geography ==
Polinosovo is located 23 km west of Alexandrov (the district's administrative centre) by road. Fedyaykovo is the nearest rural locality.
