= Posyolok imeni Lenina =

Posyolok imeni Lenina Посёлок имени Ленина
- Settlement
- Location within Vladimir Oblast Location within Russia
- Coordinates: 56°22′N 38°27′E
- Country: Russia
- Region: Vladimir Oblast
- District: Alexandrovsky District
- Time zone: UTC+3:00

Posyolok imeni Lenina (Russian: Посёлок имени Ленина) is a rural locality (a settlement) in Slednevskoye Rural Settlement, Alexandrovsky District, Vladimir Oblast, Russia. The population was 97 as of 2010. There are five streets.

== Geography ==
The settlement is located 25 km west of Alexandrov (the district's administrative centre) by road. Arsaki is the nearest rural locality.
