= Plekhany =

Plekhany Плеханы
- Village
- Location within Vladimir Oblast Location within Russia
- Coordinates: 56°20′N 38°27′E
- Country: Russia
- Region: Vladimir Oblast
- District: Alexandrovsky District
- Time zone: UTC+3:00

Plekhany (Russian: Плеханы) is a rural locality (a village) in Karinskoye Rural Settlement, Alexandrovsky District, Vladimir Oblast, Russia. The population was 10 as of 2010. There are 2 streets.

== Geography ==
Plekhany is located 25 km southwest of Alexandrov (the district's administrative centre) by road. Voskresenskoye is the nearest rural locality.
