= Bazunovo =

Bazunovo Базуново
- Village
- Location within Vladimir Oblast Location within Russia
- Coordinates: 56°30′N 39°03′E
- Country: Russia
- Region: Vladimir Oblast
- District: Alexandrovsky District
- Time zone: UTC+3:00

Bazunovo (Russian: Базуново) is a rural locality (a village) in Andreyevskoye Rural Settlement, Alexandrovsky District, Vladimir Oblast, Russia. The population was 2 as of 2010.

== Geography ==
Bazunovo is located 30 km northeast of Alexandrov (the district's administrative centre) by road. Suslovka is the nearest rural locality.
