= Bashkino =

Bashkino Башкино
- Village
- Location within Vladimir Oblast Location within Russia
- Coordinates: 56°21′N 39°01′E
- Country: Russia
- Region: Vladimir Oblast
- District: Alexandrovsky District
- Time zone: UTC+3:00

Bashkino (Russian: Башкино) is a rural locality (a village) in Andreyevskoye Rural Settlement, Alexandrovsky District, Vladimir Oblast, Russia. The population was 7 as of 2010.

== Geography ==
Bashkino is located 31 km southeast of Alexandrov (the district's administrative centre) by road. Bunkovo is the nearest rural locality.
