= Zhelnino, Alexandrovsky District, Vladimir Oblast =

Zhelnino Желнино
- Village
- Location within Vladimir Oblast Location within Russia
- Coordinates: 56°37′N 38°27′E
- Country: Russia
- Region: Vladimir Oblast
- District: Alexandrovsky District
- Time zone: UTC+3:00

Zhelnino (Russian: Желнино) is a rural locality (a village) in Krasnoplamenskoye Rural Settlement, Alexandrovsky District, Vladimir Oblast, Russia. The population was 10 as of 2010. There is 1 street.

== Geography ==
Zhelnino is located 53 km northwest of Alexandrov (the district's administrative centre) by road. Glyadkovo is the nearest rural locality.
