= Prokofyevo =

Prokofyevo Прокофьево
- Village
- Location within Vladimir Oblast Location within Russia
- Coordinates: 56°24′N 39°02′E
- Country: Russia
- Region: Vladimir Oblast
- District: Alexandrovsky District
- Time zone: UTC+3:00

Prokofyevo (Russian: Прокофьево) is a rural locality (a village) in Andreyevskoye Rural Settlement, Alexandrovsky District, Vladimir Oblast, Russia. The population was 35 as of 2010.

== Geography ==
Prokofyevo is located 21 km east of Alexandrov (the district's administrative centre) by road. Mezhakovo is the nearest rural locality.
