= Vyazmino =

Vyazmino Вязьмино
- Village
- Location within Vladimir Oblast Location within Russia
- Coordinates: 56°19′N 38°53′E
- Country: Russia
- Region: Vladimir Oblast
- District: Alexandrovsky District
- Time zone: UTC+3:00

Vyazmino (Russian: Вязьмино) is a rural locality (a village) in Andreyevskoye Rural Settlement, Alexandrovsky District, Vladimir Oblast, Russia. The population was 38 as of 2010. There are 2 streets.

== Geography ==
Vyazmino is located 14 km southeast of Alexandrov (the district's administrative centre) by road. Maloye Marinkino is the nearest rural locality.
