= Baksheyevo =

Baksheyevo Бакшеево
- Selo
- Location within Vladimir Oblast Location within Russia
- Coordinates: 56°26′N 38°42′E
- Country: Russia
- Region: Vladimir Oblast
- District: Alexandrovsky District
- Time zone: UTC+3:00

Baksheyevo (Russian: Бакше́ево) is a rural locality (a selo) in Slednevskoye Rural Settlement, Alexandrovsky District, Vladimir Oblast, Russia. The population was 464 as of 2010. There are 11 streets.

== Geography ==
Baksheyevo is located 9 km north of Alexandrov (the district's administrative centre) by road. Stepanikha is the nearest rural locality.
