= Marino, Alexandrovsky District, Vladimir Oblast =

Marino Марино
- Village
- Location within Vladimir Oblast Location within Russia
- Coordinates: 56°21′N 38°41′E
- Country: Russia
- Region: Vladimir Oblast
- District: Alexandrovsky District
- Time zone: UTC+3:00

Marino (Russian: Марино) is a rural locality (a village) in Karinskoye Rural Settlement, Alexandrovsky District, Vladimir Oblast, Russia. The population was 67 as of 2010. There are 7 streets.

== Geography ==
Marino is located 6 km south of Alexandrov (the district's administrative centre) by road. Alexandrov is the nearest rural locality.
