= Spornovo =

Spornovo (Russian: Спорново) is the name of several rural localities in Russia.

== Modern localities ==
- Spornovo, Vladimir Oblast, a village in Alexandrovsky District of Vladimir Oblast

== Abolished localities ==
- Spornovo, Kostroma Oblast, a village in Shirsky Selsoviet of Parfenyevsky District in Kostroma Oblast; abolished on October 18, 2004
