= Kruglyshevo =

Kruglyshevo Круглышево
- Village
- Location within Vladimir Oblast Location within Russia
- Coordinates: 56°31′N 38°19′E
- Country: Russia
- Region: Vladimir Oblast
- District: Alexandrovsky District
- Time zone: UTC+3:00

Kruglyshevo (Russian: Круглышево) is a rural locality (a village) in Krasnoplamenskoye Rural Settlement, Alexandrovsky District, Vladimir Oblast, Russia. The population was 19 as of 2010. There is 1 street.

== Geography ==
Kruglyshevo is located on the Rassolovka, 33 km northwest of Alexandrov (the district's administrative centre) by road. Mukhanovo is the nearest rural locality.
