= Vedevo =

Vedevo Ведево
- Village
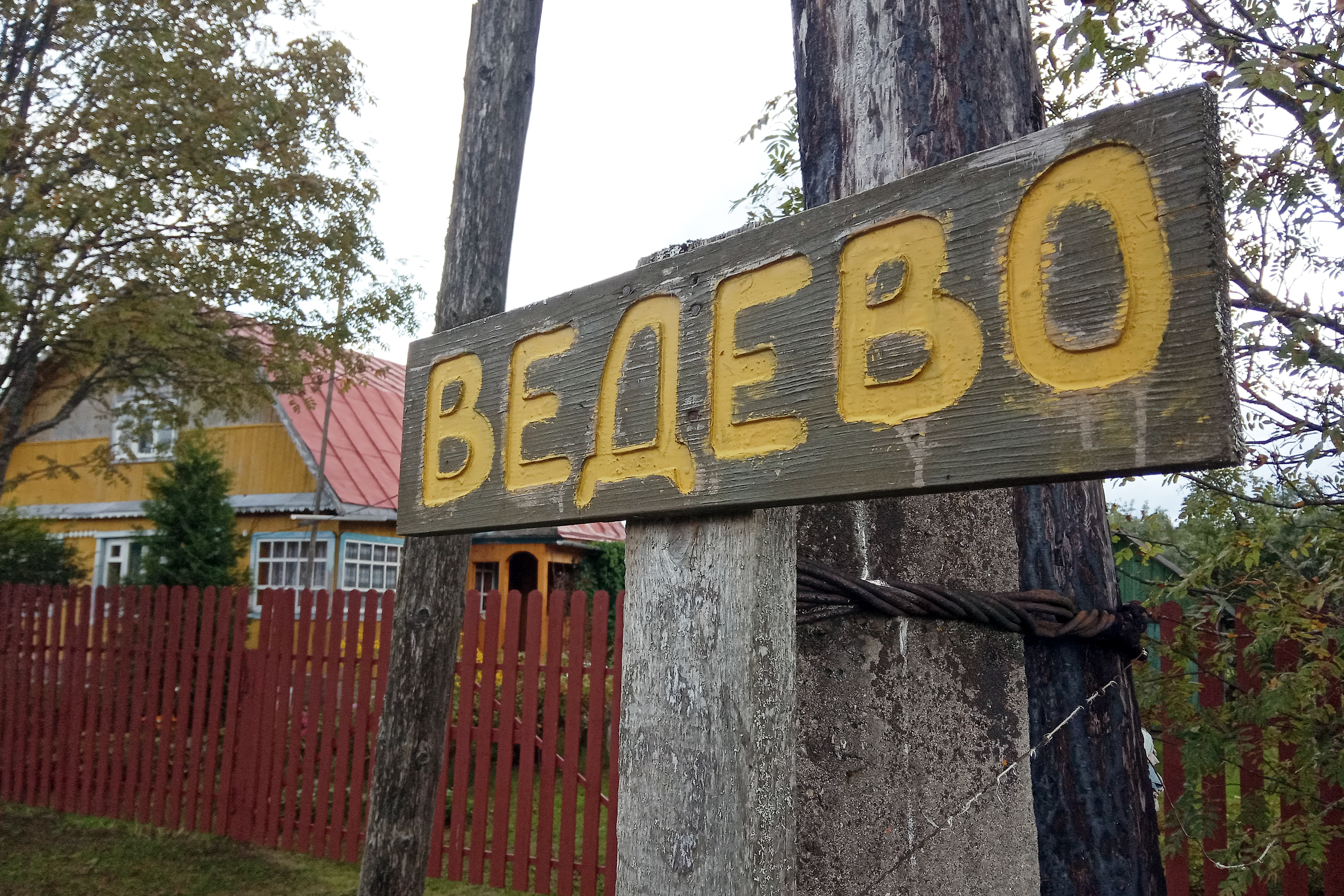

- Location within Vladimir Oblast Location within Russia
- Coordinates: 56°20′N 38°44′E
- Country: Russia
- Region: Vladimir Oblast
- District: Alexandrovsky District
- Time zone: UTC+3:00

Vedevo (Russian: Ведево) is a rural locality (a village) in Karinskoye Rural Settlement, Alexandrovsky District, Vladimir Oblast, Russia. The population was 1 as of 2010. There is 1 street.

== Geography ==
Vedevo is located 16 km south of Alexandrov (the district's administrative centre) by road. Stepkovo is the nearest rural locality.
