= Irkovo =

Irkovo Ирково
- Selo
- Location within Vladimir Oblast Location within Russia
- Coordinates: 56°22′N 38°58′E
- Country: Russia
- Region: Vladimir Oblast
- District: Alexandrovsky District
- Time zone: UTC+3:00

Irkovo (Russian: Ирково) is a rural locality (a selo) in Andreyevskoye Rural Settlement, Alexandrovsky District, Vladimir Oblast, Russia. The population was 1 as of 2010.

== Geography ==
Irkovo is located 18 km east of Alexandrov (the district's administrative centre) by road. Andreyevskoye is the nearest rural locality.
