= Vladimir Sarenpya =

Soviet murderer

- Born: Vladimir Ronaldovich Sarenpya; 1949; Coos Bay, Oregon, U.S.
- Died: 1976 (aged 26–27); USSR
- Cause of death: Execution by shooting
- Other names: "The Alexandrovsky Ripper" "The Alexandrovsky Chikatilo" "Wolf's Mouth" "Jaws"
- Conviction: Murder
- Penalty: Death

Details
- Victims: 2
- Span of crimes: 1975–1976
- Country: Soviet Union
- State: Vladimir
- Date apprehended: March 11, 1976

Vladimir Ronaldovich Sarenpya (Russian: Владимир Рональдович Саренпя; Finnish: Saarenpää; 1949 – 1976), known as The Alexandrovsky Ripper (Russian: Александровский Джек-Потрошитель), was an American-born Soviet murderer.

== Biography ==
Sarenpya was born in 1949 in Coos Bay, Oregon to a family of communists of Finnish origin, who moved to the USSR soon after his birth. He eventually married, and had two daughters, working as a bus driver at the Aleksandrovsky Motor Transport Enterprise.

On September 27, 1975, Sarenpya made his first attack on a woman. On the road from Alexandrov to the village of Baksheevo he attacked a bicyclist, knocking her off her bike and hitting her on the head with a stone, but the woman managed to escape. On November 5, 1975, Sarenpya attacked another woman in the area of the Dvorikovsky highway, beating her until she lost consciousness. He was about to kill her when he was prevented by a group of nearby schoolchildren who started screaming. On November 14, 1975, Sarenpya committed his first murder in the forest near the "Aleksandrov" railway station. The victim was 18-year-old radio equipment installer at the Aleksandrovsky radio plant Tatiana Bersenieva. He raped her, then killed her with hammer blows and left the body in the forest. As a calling card, Sarenpya left bite marks on the victim's body. The body was soon discovered, and the cause of death was determined. A criminal case was opened, but six months later it was suspended due to an inability to identify the suspect. On January 16, 1976, Sarenpya committed another attack in an engineering plant, beating a woman with a metal bar until she lost consciousness.

The city began to panic. People were afraid to go out in the streets at night and demanded that the authorities quickly find the unknown killer. On March 6, 1976, Sarenpya killed the district communications center's telegraph operator, Inna Grichugin, again leaving bite marks on her body. As it later turned out, he was interested in her, but she had rejected Sarenpya because he had a wife and children.

Sarenpya became the prime suspect as he was an acquaintance of the last victim. On March 11, he testified that on the day of the murder he was in a restaurant with a friend, but that was quickly refuted. In his apartment, belongings of the victims were found. Under the weight of the evidence, Sarenpya admitted to having committed two murders and nine attempted murders. In 1976, the Vladimir Oblast Regional Court sentenced Vladimir Sarenpya to death, and he was soon executed by single executioner shooting.

=== In the media ===
Sarenpya's case was covered in the documentary film series "The investigation was conducted...", under the title "Jaws".

== See also ==
- List of Russian serial killers
