= Kurganikha =

Kurganikha Курганиха
- Village
- Location within Vladimir Oblast Location within Russia
- Coordinates: 56°22′N 38°37′E
- Country: Russia
- Region: Vladimir Oblast
- District: Alexandrovsky District
- Time zone: UTC+3:00

Kurganikha (Russian: Курганиха) is a rural locality (a village) in Karinskoye Rural Settlement, Alexandrovsky District, Vladimir Oblast, Russia. The population was 24 as of 2010. There are 3 streets.

== Geography ==
Kurganikha is located 10 km west of Alexandrov (the district's administrative centre) by road. Strunino is the nearest rural locality.
