= Tiribrovo =

Tiribrovo Тириброво
- Village
- Location within Vladimir Oblast Location within Russia
- Coordinates: 56°30′N 38°28′E
- Country: Russia
- Region: Vladimir Oblast
- District: Alexandrovsky District
- Time zone: UTC+3:00

Tiribrovo (Russian: Тириброво) is a rural locality (a village) in Krasnoplamenskoye Rural Settlement, Alexandrovsky District, Vladimir Oblast, Russia. The population was 110 as of 2010. There are 2 streets.

== Geography ==
Tiribrovo is located 35 km northeast of Alexandrov (the district's administrative centre) by road. Mayovka is the nearest rural locality.
