= Afonasovo =

Afonasovo Афонасово
- Village
- Location within Vladimir Oblast Location within Russia
- Coordinates: 56°15′N 38°42′E
- Country: Russia
- Region: Vladimir Oblast
- District: Alexandrovsky District
- Time zone: UTC+3:00

Afonasovo (Russian: Афонасово) is a rural locality (a village) in Karinskoye Rural Settlement, Alexandrovsky District, Vladimir Oblast, Russia. The population was 5 as of 2010. There are 4 streets.

== Geography ==
Afonasovo is located 19 km south of Alexandrov (the district's administrative centre) by road. Makhra is the nearest rural locality.
