= Maloye Marinkino =

Maloye Marinkino Малое Маринкино
- Village
- Location within Vladimir Oblast Location within Russia
- Coordinates: 56°20′N 38°54′E
- Country: Russia
- Region: Vladimir Oblast
- District: Alexandrovsky District
- Time zone: UTC+3:00

Maloye Marinkino (Russian: Малое Маринкино) is a rural locality (a village) in Andreyevskoye Rural Settlement, Alexandrovsky District, Vladimir Oblast, Russia. The population was 9 as of 2010.

== Geography ==
Maloye Marinkino is located 14 km southeast of Alexandrov (the district's administrative centre) by road. Bolshoye Marinkino is the nearest rural locality.
