= Snyatinovo =

Snyatinovo Снятиново
- Village
- Location within Vladimir Oblast Location within Russia
- Coordinates: 56°15′N 38°33′E
- Country: Russia
- Region: Vladimir Oblast
- District: Alexandrovsky District
- Time zone: UTC+3:00

Snyatinovo (Russian: Снятиново) is a rural locality (a village) in Karinskoye Rural Settlement, Alexandrovsky District, Vladimir Oblast, Russia. The population was 15 as of 2010. There are 10 streets.

== Geography ==
Snyatinovo is located on the Molokcha River, 32 km southwest of Alexandrov (the district's administrative centre) by road. Gideyevo is the nearest rural locality.
