= Iskra, Vladimir Oblast =

Iskra Искра
- Settlement
- Location within Vladimir Oblast Location within Russia
- Coordinates: 56°31′N 38°22′E
- Country: Russia
- Region: Vladimir Oblast
- District: Alexandrovsky District
- Time zone: UTC+3:00

Iskra (Russian: Искра) is a rural locality (a settlement) in Krasnoplamenskoye Rural Settlement, Alexandrovsky District, Vladimir Oblast, Russia. The population was 376 as of 2010. There are 7 streets.

== Geography ==
Iskra is located 35 km northwest of Alexandrov (the district's administrative centre) by road. Ratkovo is the nearest rural locality.
