= Gideyevo =

Gideyevo Гидеево
- Village
- Location within Vladimir Oblast Location within Russia
- Coordinates: 56°16′N 38°32′E
- Country: Russia
- Region: Vladimir Oblast
- District: Alexandrovsky District
- Time zone: UTC+3:00

Gideyevo (Russian: Гидеево) is a rural locality (a village) in Karinskoye Rural Settlement, Alexandrovsky District, Vladimir Oblast, Russia. The population was 8 as of 2010. There are 7 streets.

== Geography ==
Gideyevo is located 30 km southwest of Alexandrov (the district's administrative centre) by road. Snyatinovo is the nearest rural locality.
