= Neglovo =

Neglovo Неглово
- Village
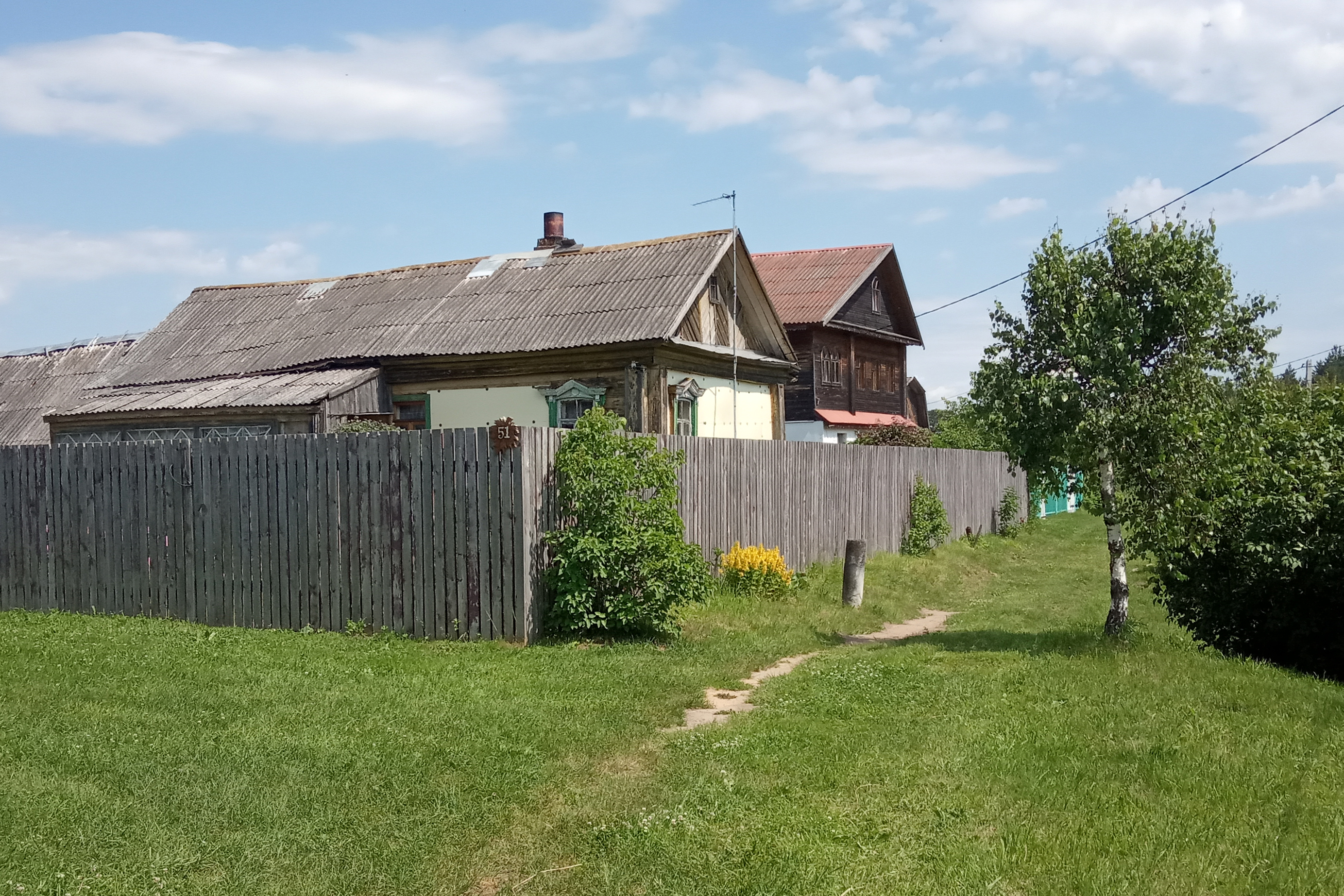
- A picture of the village

- Location within Vladimir Oblast Location within Russia
- Coordinates: 56°16′N 38°38′E
- Country: Russia
- Region: Vladimir Oblast
- District: Alexandrovsky District
- Time zone: UTC+3:00

Neglovo (Russian: Неглово) is a rural locality (a village) in Karinskoye Rural Settlement, Alexandrovsky District, Vladimir Oblast, Russia. The population was 22 as of 2010. There is 1 street.

== Geography ==
Neglovo is located on the Molokcha River, 20 km southwest of Alexandrov (the district's administrative centre) by road. Makhra is the nearest rural locality.
