= Zelentsino =

Zelentsino Зеленцино
- Village
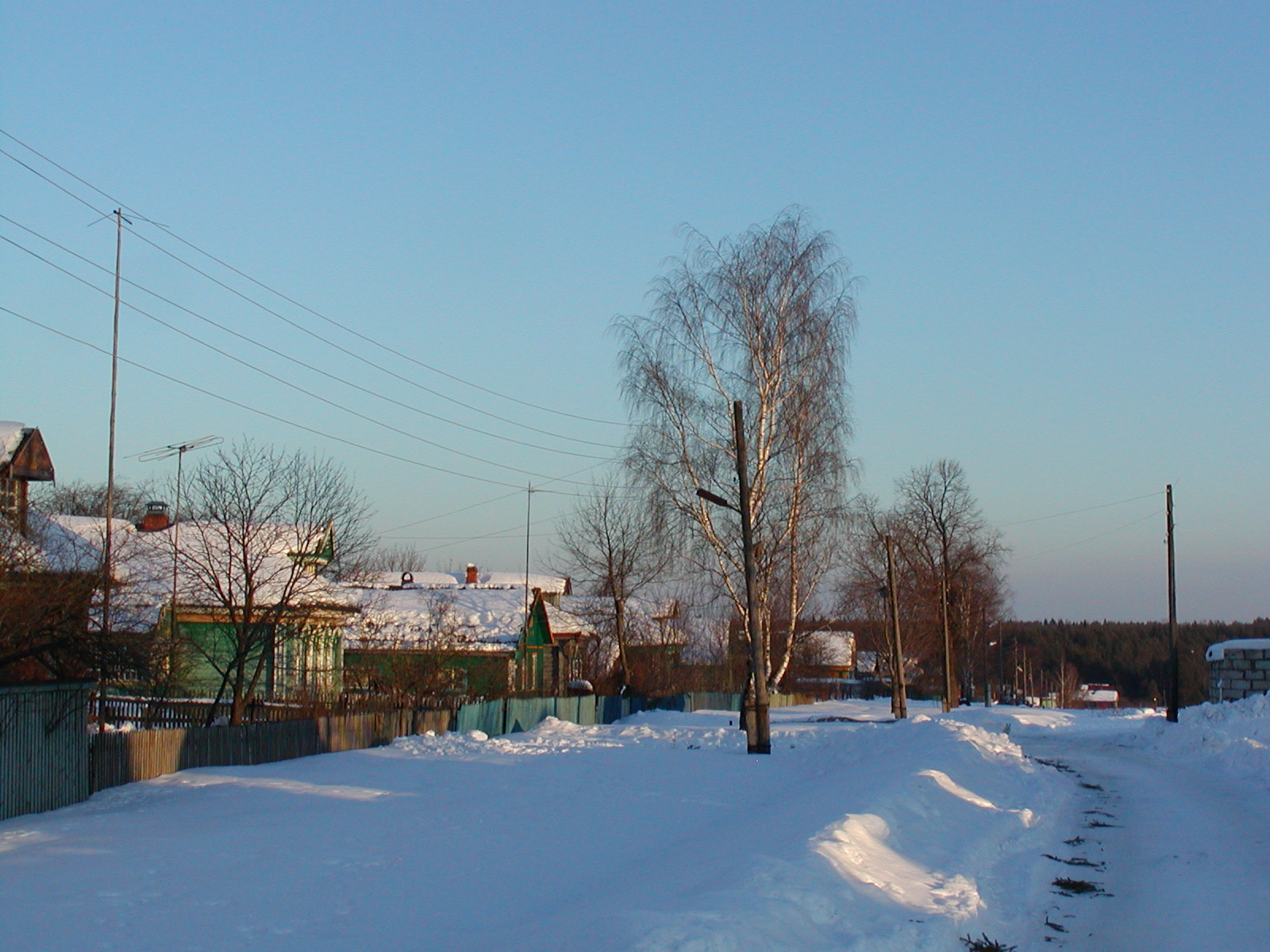

- Location within Vladimir Oblast Location within Russia
- Coordinates: 56°17′N 38°45′E
- Country: Russia
- Region: Vladimir Oblast
- District: Alexandrovsky District
- Time zone: UTC+3:00

Zelentsino (Russian: Зеленцино) is a rural locality (a village) in Karinskoye Rural Settlement, Alexandrovsky District, Vladimir Oblast, Russia. The population was 73 as of 2010. There are 10 streets.

== Geography ==
Zelentsino is located 15 km south of Alexandrov (the district's administrative centre) by road. Karabanovo is the nearest rural locality.
