= Lisavy =

Lisavy Лисавы
- Village
- Location within Vladimir Oblast Location within Russia
- Coordinates: 56°32′N 38°31′E
- Country: Russia
- Region: Vladimir Oblast
- District: Alexandrovsky District
- Time zone: UTC+3:00

Lisavy (Russian: Лисавы) is a rural locality (a village) in Krasnoplamenskoye Rural Settlement, Alexandrovsky District, Vladimir Oblast, Russia. The population was 232 as of 2010. There are 5 streets.

== Geography ==
Lisavy is located on the Sablya River, 39 km northwest of Alexandrov (the district's administrative centre) by road. Otertikovo is the nearest rural locality.
