= Monastyryovo =

Monastyryovo Монастырёво
- Village
- Location within Vladimir Oblast Location within Russia
- Coordinates: 56°25′N 38°37′E
- Country: Russia
- Region: Vladimir Oblast
- District: Alexandrovsky District
- Time zone: UTC+3:00

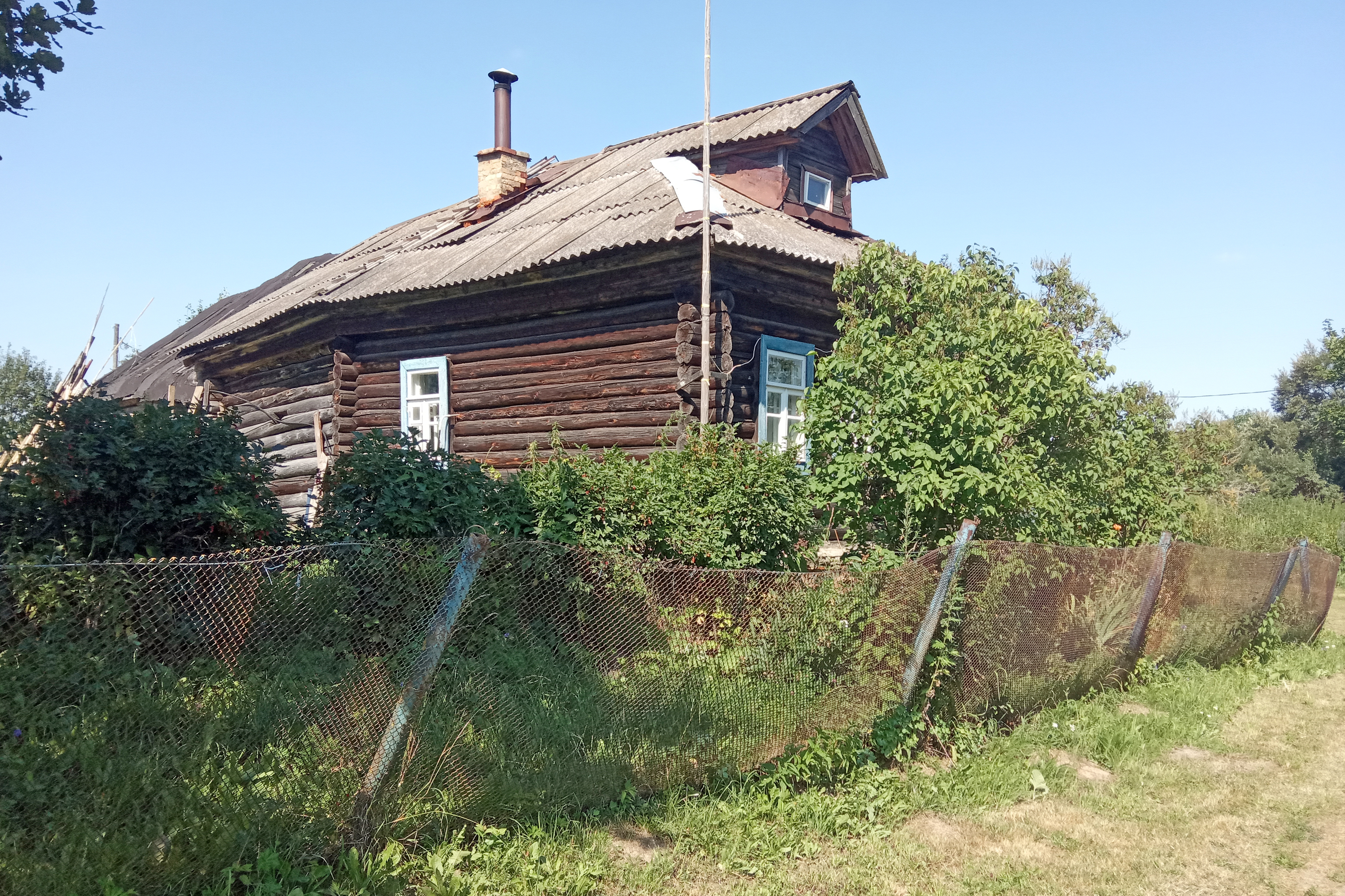

Monastyryovo (Russian: Монастырёво) is a rural locality (a village) in Slednevskoye Rural Settlement, Alexandrovsky District, Vladimir Oblast, Russia. The population was 6 as of 2010. There is 1 street.

== Geography ==
Monastyryovo is located on the Chyornaya River, 12 km northwest of Alexandrov (the district's administrative centre) by road. Dolmatovo is the nearest rural locality.
