= Gorki, Andreyevskoye Rural Settlement, Alexandrovsky District, Vladimir Oblast =

Gorki Горки
- Village
- Location within Vladimir Oblast Location within Russia
- Coordinates: 56°26′N 38°57′E
- Country: Russia
- Region: Vladimir Oblast
- District: Alexandrovsky District
- Time zone: UTC+3:00

Gorki (Russian: Горки) is a rural locality (a village) in Andreyevskoye Rural Settlement, Alexandrovsky District, Vladimir Oblast, Russia. The population was 10 as of 2010.

== Geography ==
The village is located on the north bank of the Maly Kirchazh River.
