= Arsaki (settlement), Vladimir Oblast =

Arsaki Арсаки
- Settlement
- Location within Vladimir Oblast Location within Russia
- Coordinates: 56°23′N 38°27′E
- Country: Russia
- Region: Vladimir Oblast
- District: Alexandrovsky District
- Time zone: UTC+3:00

Arsaki (Russian: Арса́ки) is a rural locality (a settlement) in Slednevskoye Rural Settlement, Alexandrovsky District, Vladimir Oblast, Russia. The population was 960 as of 2010. There are 10 streets.

== Geography ==
Arsaki is located 24 km west of Alexandrov (the district's administrative centre) by road. Imeni Lenina is the nearest rural locality.
