= Spornovo, Vladimir Oblast =

Spornovo Спорново
- Village
- Location within Vladimir Oblast Location within Russia
- Coordinates: 56°32′N 39°13′E
- Country: Russia
- Region: Vladimir Oblast
- District: Alexandrovsky District
- Time zone: UTC+3:00

Spornovo (Russian: Спорново) is a rural locality (a village) in Andreyevskoye Rural Settlement, Alexandrovsky District, Vladimir Oblast, Russia. The population was 138 as of 2010.

== Geography ==
Spornovo is located 41 km northeast of Alexandrov (the district's administrative centre) by road. Podvyazye is the nearest rural locality.
