= Arsaki (hamlet), Vladimir Oblast =

Arsaki Арсаки
- Hamlet
- Location within Vladimir Oblast Location within Russia
- Coordinates: 56°23′N 38°28′E
- Country: Russia
- Region: Vladimir Oblast
- District: Alexandrovsky District
- Time zone: UTC+3:00

Arsaki (Russian: Арсаки) is a rural locality (a hamlet) in Slednevskoye Rural Settlement, Alexandrovsky District, Vladimir Oblast, Russia. The population was 86 as of 2010. There are five streets.

== Geography ==
Arsaki is located 24 km (15 mi) west of Alexandrov (the district's administrative centre) by road. Arsaki (settlement) is the nearest rural locality.
