= Staraya Sloboda, Vladimir Oblast =

Staraya Sloboda Старая Слобода
- Selo
- Location within Vladimir Oblast Location within Russia
- Coordinates: 56°26′N 38°47′E
- Country: Russia
- Region: Vladimir Oblast
- District: Alexandrovsky District
- Time zone: UTC+3:00

Staraya Sloboda (Russian: Старая Слобода) is a rural locality (a selo) in Slednevskoye Rural Settlement, Alexandrovsky District, Vladimir Oblast, Russia. The population was 56 as of 2010. There are 11 streets.

== Geography ==
The village is located 6 Km north-west from Alexandrov.
