= Goltsovo, Vladimir Oblast =

Goltsovo Гольцово
- Village
- Location within Vladimir Oblast Location within Russia
- Coordinates: 56°38′N 38°22′E
- Country: Russia
- Region: Vladimir Oblast
- District: Alexandrovsky District
- Time zone: UTC+3:00

Goltsovo (Russian: Гольцово) is a rural locality (a village) in Krasnoplamenskoye Rural Settlement, Alexandrovsky District, Vladimir Oblast, Russia. The population was 14 as of 2010. There is 1 street.

== Geography ==
Goltsovo is located 59 km northwest of Alexandrov (the district's administrative centre) by road. Grigorovo is the nearest rural locality.
