= Nikolay Iyezuitov =

Russian cinema historian (1899–1941)

Nikolay Mikhaylovich Iyezuitov (Russian: Никола́й Миха́йлович Иезуи́тов, 5 November 1899 [O.S. 24 October] – 1941) was a Soviet cinema historian and critic who contributed to the foundation of cinema studies in the Soviet Union.

== Biography ==
Nikolay Iyezuitov was born in the town of Alexandrov in the Vladimir Governorate (now in Vladimir Oblast) in 1899. He graduated from Moscow University and joined the Society of Marxist Historians in 1924.

Iyezuitov taught historical materialism and dialectical materialism at secondary schools and colleges in Moscow in the 1920s and worked at the Communist Academy in 1930-1932. He came to Leningrad to teach at the State Academy of Art Studies in 1932, but returned Moscow to head the history department at the All-Union State Institute of Cinematography (VGIK) in 1936, where he was made a full professor in 1939.

Professor Iyezuitov volunteered to serve in a people's militia after the German invasion of the Soviet Union and died at the front in 1941.
