= Bolshoye Karinskoye =

Bolshoye Karinskoye Большое Каринское
- Selo
- Location within Vladimir Oblast Location within Russia
- Coordinates: 56°22′N 38°39′E
- Country: Russia
- Region: Vladimir Oblast
- District: Alexandrovsky District
- Time zone: UTC+3:00

Bolshoye Karinskoye (Russian: Большое Каринское) is a rural locality (a selo) and the administrative center of Karinskoye Rural Settlement, Alexandrovsky District, Vladimir Oblast, Russia. The population was 404 as of 2010. There are 7 streets.

== Geography ==
Bolshoye Karinskoye is located 9 km west of Alexandrov (the district's administrative centre) by road. Maloye Karinskoye is the nearest rural locality.
