= Danilkovo, Kaduysky District, Vologda Oblast =

Danilkovo Данилково
- Village
- Location within Vologda Oblast Location within Russia
- Coordinates: 59°37′N 37°06′E
- Country: Russia
- Region: Vologda Oblast
- District: Kaduysky District
- Time zone: UTC+3:00

Danilkovo (Russian: Данилково) is a rural locality (a village) in Nikolskoye Rural Settlement, Kaduysky District, Vologda Oblast, Russia. The population was 10 as of 2002.

== Geography ==
Danilkovo is located 61 km north of Kaduy (the district's administrative centre) by road. Kumsara is the nearest rural locality.
