= Danilkovo, Vyaznikovsky District, Vladimir Oblast =

Danilkovo Данилково
- Village
- Location within Vladimir Oblast Location within Russia
- Coordinates: 56°12′N 42°14′E
- Country: Russia
- Region: Vladimir Oblast
- District: Vyaznikovsky District
- Time zone: UTC+3:00

Danilkovo (Russian: Данилково) is a rural locality (a village) in Gorod Vyazniki, Vyaznikovsky District, Vladimir Oblast, Russia. The population was 60 as of 2010.

== Geography ==
Danilkovo is located 15 km southeast of Vyazniki (the district's administrative centre) by road. Peski is the nearest rural locality.
