= Demyanovo, Gryazovetsky District, Vologda Oblast =

Demyanovo Демьяново
- Selo
- Location within Vologda Oblast Location within Russia
- Coordinates: 58°53′N 41°09′E
- Country: Russia
- Region: Vologda Oblast
- District: Gryazovetsky District
- Time zone: UTC+3:00

Demyanovo (Russian: Демьяново) is a rural locality (a selo) in Vokhtozhskoye Rural Settlement, Gryazovetsky District, Vologda Oblast, Russia. The population was 10 as of 2002.

== Geography ==
Demyanovo is located 71 km (44 mi) east of Gryazovets (the administrative centre of the district) by road. Stanovoye is the nearest rural locality.
