= Grigorovo, Kaduysky District, Vologda Oblast =

Village in Vologda Oblast, Russia

Grigorovo Григорово
- Village
- Location within Vologda Oblast Location within Russia
- Coordinates: 59°11′N 36°47′E
- Country: Russia
- Region: Vologda Oblast
- District: Kaduysky District
- Time zone: UTC+3:00

Grigorovo (Russian: Григорово) is a rural locality (a village) in Semizerye Rural Settlement, Kaduysky District, Vologda Oblast, Russia. The population was 4 as of 2002.

== Geography ==
Grigorovo is located 25 km west of Kaduy (the district's administrative centre) by road. Voron is the nearest rural locality.
