= Goltsovo, Vologda Oblast =

Goltsovo Гольцово
- Village
- Location within Vologda Oblast Location within Russia
- Coordinates: 60°27′N 46°32′E
- Country: Russia
- Region: Vologda Oblast
- District: Velikoustyugsky District
- Time zone: UTC+3:00

Goltsovo (Russian: Гольцово) is a rural locality (a village) in Ust-Alexeyevskoye Rural Settlement, Velikoustyugsky District, Vologda Oblast, Russia. The population was 4 as of 2002.

== Geography ==
Goltsovo is located 58 km southeast of Veliky Ustyug (the district's administrative centre) by road. Olkhovka is the nearest rural locality.
