= Grigorovo, Melenkovsky District, Vladimir Oblast =

Village in Vladimir Oblast, Russia

Grigorovo Григорово
- Selo
- Location within Vladimir Oblast Location within Russia
- Coordinates: 55°22′N 41°56′E
- Country: Russia
- Region: Vladimir Oblast
- District: Melenkovsky District
- Time zone: UTC+3:00

Grigorovo (Russian: Григо́рово) is a rural locality (a selo) in Lyakhovskoye Rural Settlement, Melenkovsky District, Vladimir Oblast, Russia. The population was 60 as of 2010. There are 2 streets.

== Geography ==
Grigorovo is located 24 km (15 mi) east of Melenki (the district's administrative centre) by road. Korikovo is the nearest rural locality.
