= Dudenevo, Vologda Oblast =

Dudenevo Дуденево
- Village
- Location within Vologda Oblast Location within Russia
- Coordinates: 58°56′N 40°01′E
- Country: Russia
- Region: Vologda Oblast
- District: Gryazovetsky District
- Time zone: UTC+3:00

Dudenevo (Russian: Дуденево) is a rural locality (a village) in Yurovskoye Rural Settlement, Gryazovetsky District, Vologda Oblast, Russia. The population was 1 as of 2002.

== Geography ==
Dudenevo is located 18 km (11 mi) northwest of Gryazovets (the district's administrative centre) by road. Mokeyevo is the nearest rural locality.
