= Grigorovo, Yuryev-Polsky District, Vladimir Oblast =

Village in Vladimir Oblast, Russia

Grigorovo Григорово
- Selo
- Location within Vladimir Oblast Location within Russia
- Coordinates: 56°39′N 39°50′E
- Country: Russia
- Region: Vladimir Oblast
- District: Yuryev-Polsky District
- Time zone: UTC+3:00

Grigorovo (Russian: Григорово) is a rural locality (a selo) in Krasnoselskoye Rural Settlement, Yuryev-Polsky District, Vladimir Oblast, Russia. The population was 2 as of 2010.

== Geography ==
Grigorovo is located 24 km northeast of Yuryev-Polsky (the district's administrative centre) by road. Svaino is the nearest rural locality.
