= Slednevo =

Slednevo Следнево
- Village
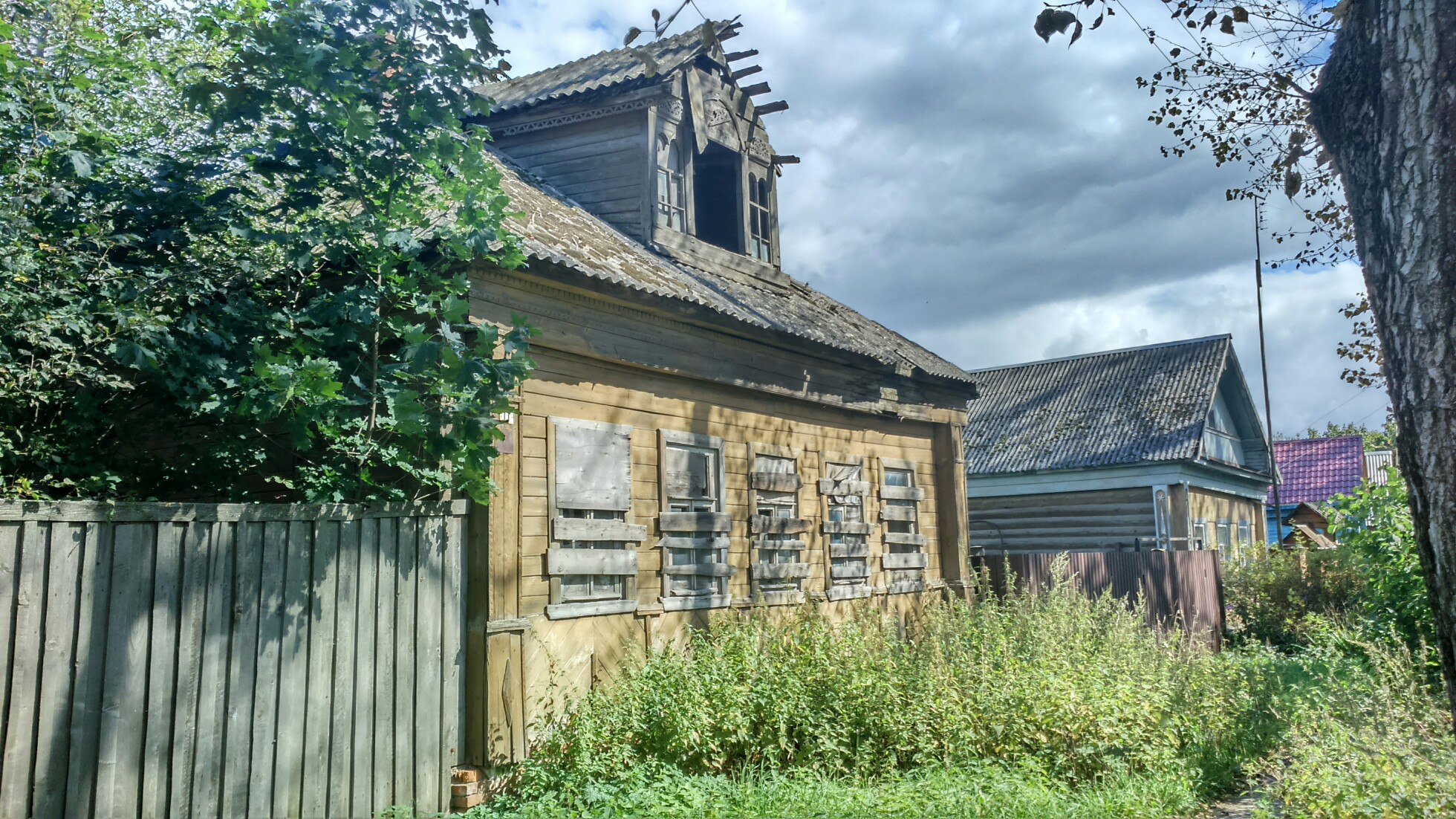

- Location within Vladimir Oblast Location within Russia
- Coordinates: 56°25′N 38°36′E
- Country: Russia
- Region: Vladimir Oblast
- District: Alexandrovsky District
- Time zone: UTC+3:00

Slednevo (Russian: Следнево) is a rural locality (a village) and the administrative center of Slednevskoye Rural Settlement, Alexandrovsky District, Vladimir Oblast, Russia. The population was 450 as of 2010. There are 7 streets.

== Geography ==
Slednevo is located 10 km west of Alexandrov (the district's administrative centre) by road. Kalinino is the nearest rural locality.
