= Krasnoye Plamya =

Krasnoye Plamya Красное Пламя
- Settlement
- Location within Vladimir Oblast Location within Russia
- Coordinates: 56°33′N 38°32′E
- Country: Russia
- Region: Vladimir Oblast
- District: Alexandrovsky District
- Time zone: UTC+3:00

Krasnoye Plamya (Russian: Красное Пламя) is a rural locality (a settlement) and the administrative center of Krasnoplamenskoye Rural Settlement, Alexandrovsky District, Vladimir Oblast, Russia. The population was 509 as of 2010. There are 17 streets.

== Geography ==
Krasnoye Plamya is located 42 km northwest of Alexandrov (the district's administrative centre) by road. Konishchevo is the nearest rural locality.
