= Alexandrov, Vladimir Oblast =

Town in Vladimir Oblast, Russia

Alexandrov Александров
- Town
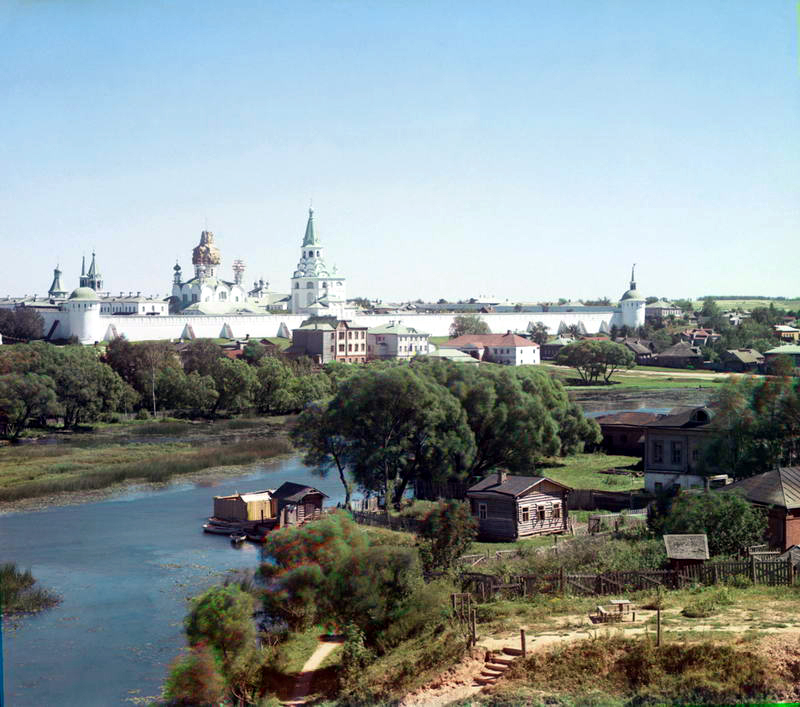
- Alexandrov Kremlin in 1911 (photo by Sergey Prokudin-Gorsky)

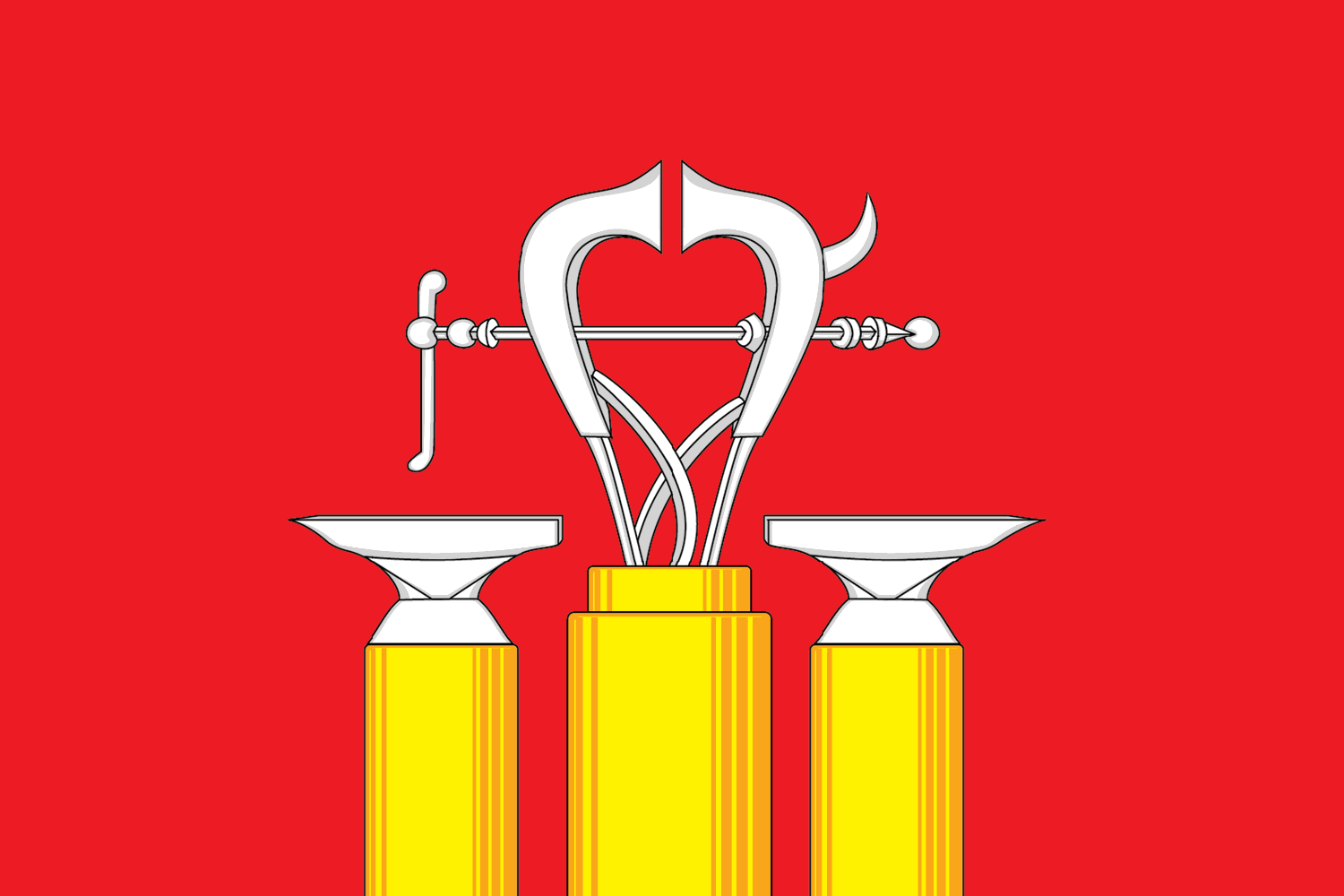
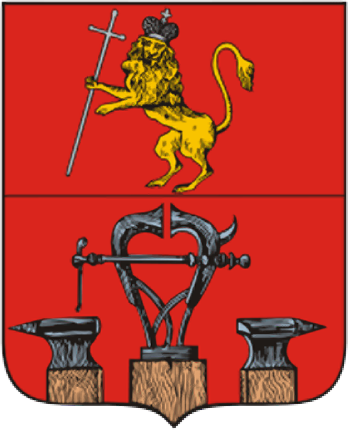
- Flag Coat of arms
- Interactive map of Alexandrov
- Location of Alexandrov Alexandrov (Vladimir Oblast)
- Coordinates: 56°24′N 38°44′E
- Country: Russia
- Federal subject: Vladimir Oblast
- Administrative district: Alexandrovsky District
- Founded: mid-14th century
- Town status since: 1778

Government
  - Head: Anatoly Ravin
- Elevation: 190 m (620 ft)

Population (2010 Census)
  - Total: 61,551
  - Estimate (2025): 54,179 (−12%)
  - Rank: 262nd in 2010

Administrative status
  - Capital of: Alexandrovsky District

Municipal status
  - Municipal district: Alexandrovsky Municipal District
  - Urban settlement: Alexandrov Urban Settlement
  - Capital of: Alexandrovsky Municipal District, Alexandrov Urban Settlement
- Time zone: UTC+3 (MSK)
- Postal code: 601650-601657
- Dialing code: +7 49244
- OKTMO ID: 17605101001
- Website: www.gorodaleksandrov.ru

Alexandrov (Russian: Александров, IPA: [ɐlʲɪˈksandrəf]) is a town and the administrative center of Alexandrovsky District in Vladimir Oblast, Russia. It is located 120 kilometers (75 mi) northeast of Moscow and has a population of 57,053 (2021 census); It was previously known as Alexandrovskaya Sloboda. It operates on the EEST time zone, with the same time zone as Vladimir.

== History ==
It was established in the mid-14th century and was known as Alexandrovskaya Sloboda (Александровская Слобода). It served as the capital of Russia for three months (from December 1564 to February 1565) under Tsar Ivan the Terrible until he agreed to return his court and the relics of Moscow which he had taken with him. Ivan agreed to return after the church gave him permission to found the Oprichnina.

It was granted town status in 1778.

== Administrative and municipal status ==
Within the framework of administrative divisions, Alexandrov serves as the administrative center of Alexandrovsky District, to which it is directly subordinated. As a municipal division, the town of Alexandrov is incorporated within Alexandrovsky Municipal District as Alexandrov Urban Settlement.

== Sister city ==
- Česká Lípa, Czech Republic
