= Alexandrovsky District, Vladimir Oblast =

Alexandrovsky District Александровский район (Russian)
- District
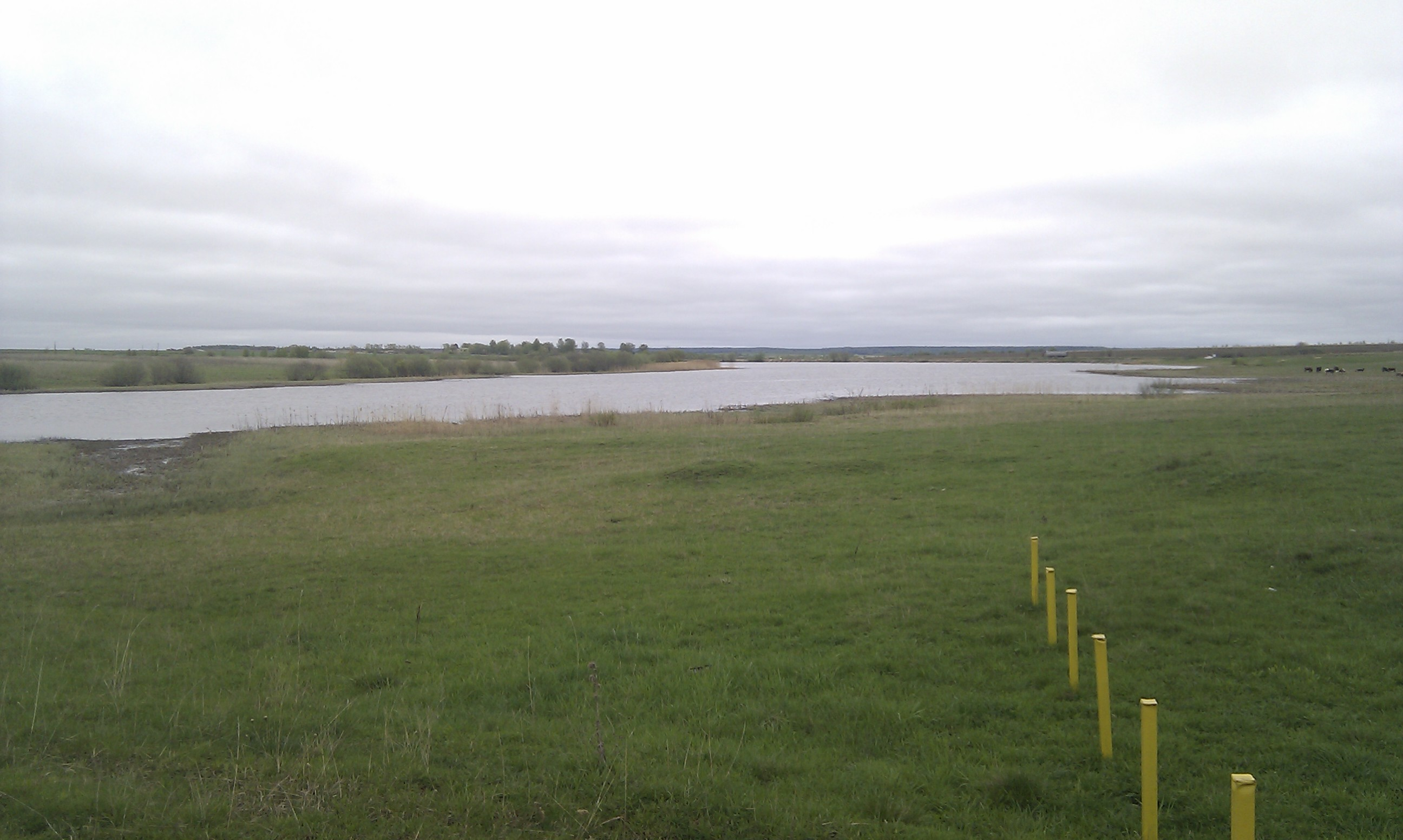
- Near the village of Marten Andreev, Alexandrovsky District

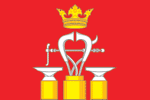
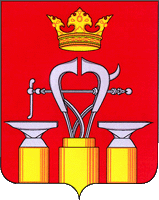
- Flag Coat of arms
- Location of Alexandrovsky District in Vladimir Oblast
- Coordinates: 56.038°N 38.218°E
- Country: Russia
- Federal subject: Vladimir Oblast
- Established: 10 April 1929
- Administrative center: Alexandrov

Area
  - Total: 1,834 km^{2} (708 sq mi)

Population (2010 Census)
  - Total: 113,900
  - Density: 62.10/km^{2} (160.9/sq mi)
  - Urban: 88.6%
  - Rural: 11.4%

Administrative structure
  - Inhabited localities: 3 cities/towns, 1 urban-type settlements, 229 rural localities

Municipal structure
  - Municipally incorporated as: Alexandrovsky Municipal District
  - Municipal divisions: 4 urban settlements, 4 rural settlements
- Time zone: UTC+3 (MSK)
- OKTMO ID: 17605000
- Website: http://aleksandrov.avo.ru/

Alexandrovsky District (Russian: Алекса́ндровский райо́н) is an administrative and municipal district (raion), one of the sixteen in Vladimir Oblast, Russia. It is located in the west of the oblast. The area of the district is 1,834 square kilometers (708 sq mi). Its administrative center is the town of Alexandrov. Population: 105,927 (2021 census); 113,900 (2010 census); 55,207 (2002 Census); 26,258 (1989 Soviet census). The population of Alexandrov accounts for 53.9% of the total district's population.

== People ==
- Sergey Elpatyevsky (1854–1933)
- Nikolay Iyezuitov (1899–1941)
- Pavel Kuznetsov (born 1961)
