= Fayzabad (disambiguation) =

Fayzabad, Feyzabad, Faizabad, and variants may refer to:

== Afghanistan ==
- Fayzabad, Badakhshan, a city in Badakhshan province
- Fayzabad District, Badakhshan, a district in Badakhshan province
- Fayzabad District, Jowzjan, a district in Jowzjan province
- Fayzabad Airport, serving Fayzabad, Badakhshan

== China ==
- Payzawat County, or Fayzabad, a county in Kashgar Prefecture, Xinjiang

== India ==
- Faizabad, a city in Uttar Pradesh state in India
- Faizabad (Lok Sabha constituency), a Lok Sabha parliamentary constituency in Uttar Pradesh state in India

== Iran ==
=== Chaharmahal and Bakhtiari Province ===
- Feyzabad, Chaharmahal and Bakhtiari, a village in Lordegan County

=== Fars Province ===
- Feyzabad, Darab, a village in Darab County
- Feyzabad, Eqlid, a village in Eqlid County
- Feyzabad, Shiraz, a village in Shiraz County

=== Gilan Province ===
- Feyzabad, Gilan, a village in Rasht County

=== Golestan Province ===
- Feyzabad, Golestan, a city in Gorgan County
- Feyzabad, Aliabad, a city in Aliabad County

=== Hamadan Province ===
- Feyzabad, Hamadan, a village in Famenin County

=== Hormozgan Province ===
- Feyzabad, Hormozgan, a village in Rudan County

=== Isfahan Province ===
- Feyzabad, Jarqavieh Olya, a village in Isfahan County
- Feyzabad, Jolgeh, a village in Isfahan County
- Feyzabad, Nain, a village in Nain County
- Feyzabad, Baharestan, a village in Nain County

=== Kerman Province ===
- Feyzabad, Rayen, a village in Kerman County
- Feyzabad, Shahdad, a village in Kerman County
- Feyzabad, alternate name of Firuzabad, Kerman, a village in Kerman County
- Feyzabad, Rafsanjan, a village in Rafsanjan County
- Feyzabad, Dehaj, a village in Shahr-e Babak County

=== Khuzestan Province ===
- Feyzabad, Khuzestan, a village in Andika County

=== Kurdistan Province ===
- Feyzabad, Kurdistan, a village in Saqqez County

=== Lorestan Province ===
- Feyzabad, Lorestan, a village in Lorestan Province

=== Markazi Province ===
- Feyzabad, Ashtian, a village in Ashtian County
- Feyzabad, Zarandieh, a village in Zarandieh County

=== North Khorasan Province ===
- Feyzabad, North Khorasan, a village in North Khorasan Province

=== Qazvin Province ===
- Feyzabad, Qazvin, a village in Qazvin Province

=== Qom Province ===
- Feyzabad, Qom, a village in Qom Province

=== Razavi Khorasan Province ===
- Feyzabad, Razavi Khorasan, a city in Mahvelat County
- Feyzabad, Chenaran, a village in Chenaran County
- Feyzabad, Davarzan, a village in Davarzan County
- Feyzabad, Fariman, a village in Fariman County
- Feyzabad, Firuzeh, a village in Firuzeh County
- Feyzabad, Joghatai, a village in Joghatai County
- Feyzabad, Khvaf, a village in Khvaf County
- Feyzabad, eastern Mazul, a village in Nishapur County
- Feyzabad, western Mazul, a village in Nishapur County
- Feyzabad-e Lalaha, a village in Fazl Rural District of Nishapur County
- Feyzabad, Rashtkhvar, a village in Rashtkhvar County
- Feyzabad, Taybad, a village in Taybad County
- Feyzabad, Torbat-e Jam, a village in Torbat-e Jam County
- Feyzabad-e Mish Mast, a village in Torbat-e Jam County

=== South Khorasan Province ===
- Feyzabad, Darmian, a village Darmian County
- Feyzabad, Khusf, a village in Khusf County
- Feyzabad, Jolgeh-e Mazhan, a village in Khusf County
- Feyzabad, Qaen, a village Qaen County

=== Tehran Province ===
- Feyzabad, Tehran, a village in Tehran Province

=== West Azerbaijan Province ===
- Feyzabad, Chaypareh, a village in Chaypareh County
- Feyzabad, Takab, a village in Takab County

=== Yazd Province ===
- Feyzabad, Khatam, a village in Khatam County
- Feyzabad-e Kohneh, a village in Abarkuh County
- Feyzabad-e Now, a village in Abarkuh County
- Feyzabad, Taft, a village in Taft County

=== Zanjan Province ===
- Feyzabad, Abhar, a village in Abhar County
- Faizabad, Tarom, a village in Tarom County

== Pakistan ==
- Fayzabad Interchange, a highway interchange between the cities of Rawalpindi and Islamabad in Pakistan

== Tajikistan ==
- Fayzobod, a town in Tajikistan
- Fayzobod District, a district in Tajikistan

== Trinidad and Tobago ==
- Fyzabad, a town in Trinidad and Tobago
  - Fyzabad (parliamentary constituency)
