= Ruhabad =

Ruhabad (Persian: روح اباد) may refer to various places in Iran:

- Ruhabad, Kerman
- Ruhabad, Zarand, Kerman Province
- Ruhabad, Qazvin
- Ruhabad, Khvaf, Razavi Khorasan Province
- Ruhabad, Mashhad, Razavi Khorasan Province
- Ruhabad, Darbqazi, Nishapur County, Razavi Khorasan Province
- Ruhabad, Rivand, Nishapur County, Razavi Khorasan Province
- Ruhabad, Rashtkhvar, Razavi Khorasan Province
