= Jeznabad =

Jeznabad or Jaznabad or Jazanabad (Persian: جزن اباد) may refer to:

- Jeznabad, Baharestan
- Jeznabad, Lay Siyah
