= Khomar, Nishapur =

Khomar خمار
- Village
- Location within Iran
- Coordinates: 36°09′13″N 58°46′17″E
- Country: Iran
- Province: Razavi Khorasan
- County: Nishapur
- Bakhsh: Central
- Rural District: Rivand
- Time zone: UTC+3:30 (IRST)
  - Summer (DST): UTC+4:30 (IRDT)

khomar (Persian: خمار, also Romanized as khomār) is a village in Rivand Rural District, in the Central District of Nishapur County, Razavi Khorasan Province, Iran.
