= Bashnij =

Bashnij بشنيج
- Village
- Location within Iran
- Coordinates: 36°15′01″N 58°40′45″E
- Country: Iran
- Province: Razavi Khorasan
- County: Nishapur
- Bakhsh: Central
- Rural District: Mazul

Population (2006)
  - Total: 693
- Time zone: UTC+3:30 (IRST)
  - Summer (DST): UTC+4:30 (IRDT)

Bashnij (Persian: بشنيج, also Romanized as Bashnīj; also known as Bashnījābād) is a village in Mazul Rural District, in the Central District of Nishapur County, Razavi Khorasan Province, Iran. At the 2006 census, its population was 693, in 184 families.
