= Mamuri, Mazul =

Mamuri معموري کهنه
- Village
- Location within Iran
- Coordinates: 36°13′25″N 58°43′50″E
- Country: Iran
- Province: Razavi Khorasan
- County: Nishapur
- Bakhsh: Central
- Rural District: Mazul

Population (2011)
  - Total: 38
- Time zone: UTC+3:30 (IRST)
  - Summer (DST): UTC+4:30 (IRDT)

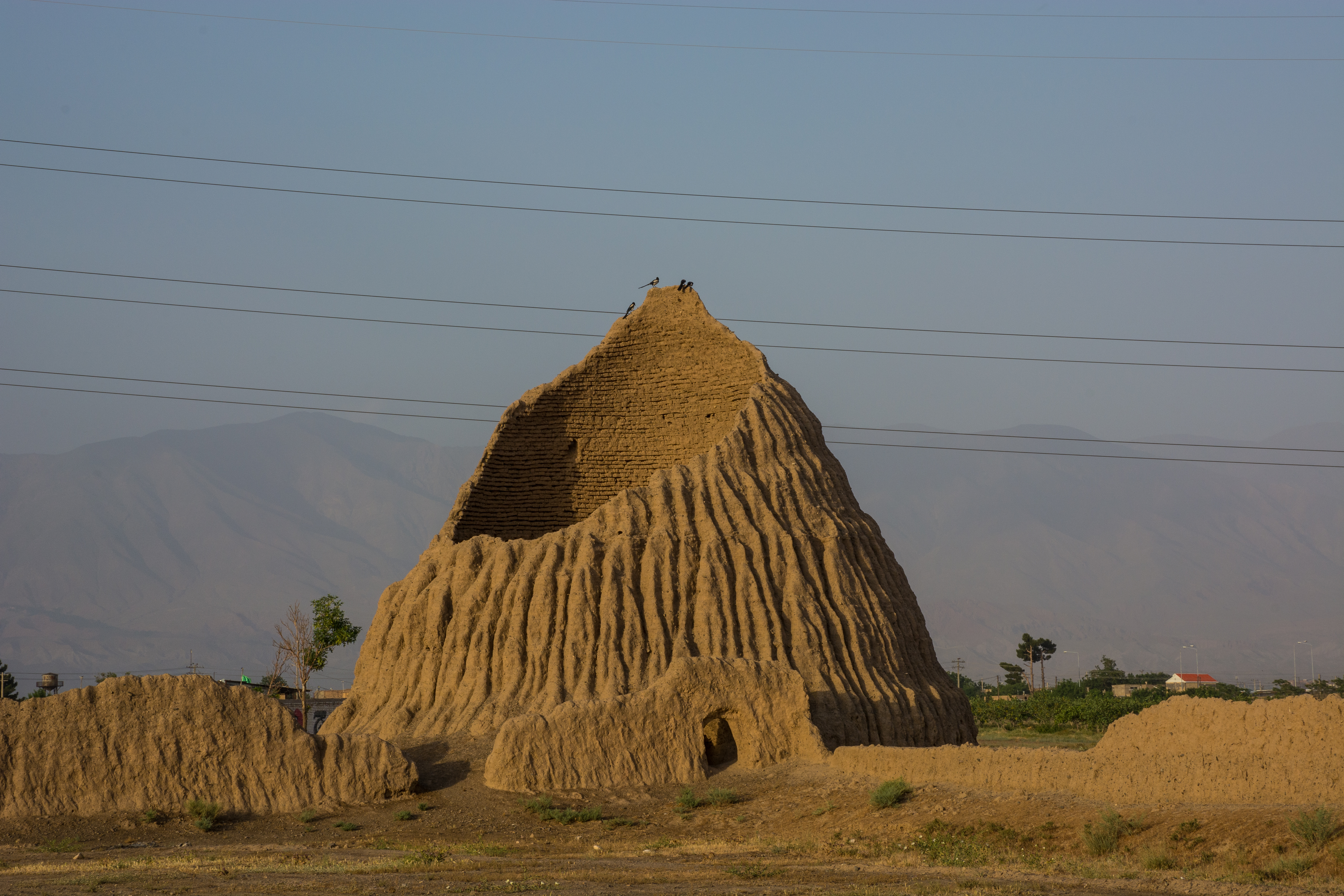
Dolatabad Icehouse, Neyshabur

Mamuri (Persian: معموري, also Romanized as Ma‘mūrī; also known as Kohneh Ma‘mūrī) is a village in Mazul Rural District, in the Central District of Nishapur County, Razavi Khorasan Province, Iran. At the 2006 census, its population was 38, in 10 families.
