= Chah Boland =

Chah Boland چاه بلند
- Village
- Location within Iran
- Coordinates: 36°11′36″N 58°49′59″E
- Country: Iran
- Province: Razavi Khorasan
- County: Nishapur
- Bakhsh: Central
- Rural District: Fazl

Population (2006)
  - Total: 303
- Time zone: UTC+3:30 (IRST)
  - Summer (DST): UTC+4:30 (IRDT)

Chah Boland (Persian: چاه بلند, also Romanized as Chāh Boland) is a village in Fazl Rural District, in the Central District of Nishapur County, Razavi Khorasan Province, Iran. At the 2006 census, its population was 303, in 85 families.
