= Helali =

Helali (Persian: هلالي) may refer to:

- Halali, Mashhad
- Helali, Nishapur
- Helali District, in Razavi Khorasan Province

== See also ==
- Halali (disambiguation)
