= Deh-e Habbeh =

Deh-e Habbeh ده حبه
- Village
- Location within Iran
- Coordinates: 36°11′20″N 58°42′27″E
- Country: Iran
- Province: Razavi Khorasan
- County: Nishapur
- Bakhsh: Central
- Rural District: Rivand

Population (2006)
  - Total: 103
- Time zone: UTC+3:30 (IRST)
  - Summer (DST): UTC+4:30 (IRDT)

Deh-e Habbeh (Persian: ده حبه, also Romanized as Deh-e Ḩabbeh; also known as Deh-e Jabbeh) is a village in Rivand Rural District, in the Central District of Nishapur County, Razavi Khorasan Province, Iran. At the 2006 census, its population was 103, in 25 families.
