= Haqqiyeh =

Haqqiyeh حقيه
- Village
- Location within Iran
- Coordinates: 36°09′40″N 58°48′32″E
- Country: Iran
- Province: Razavi Khorasan
- County: Nishapur
- Bakhsh: Central
- Rural District: Darbqazi

Population (2006)
  - Total: 354
- Time zone: UTC+3:30 (IRST)
  - Summer (DST): UTC+4:30 (IRDT)

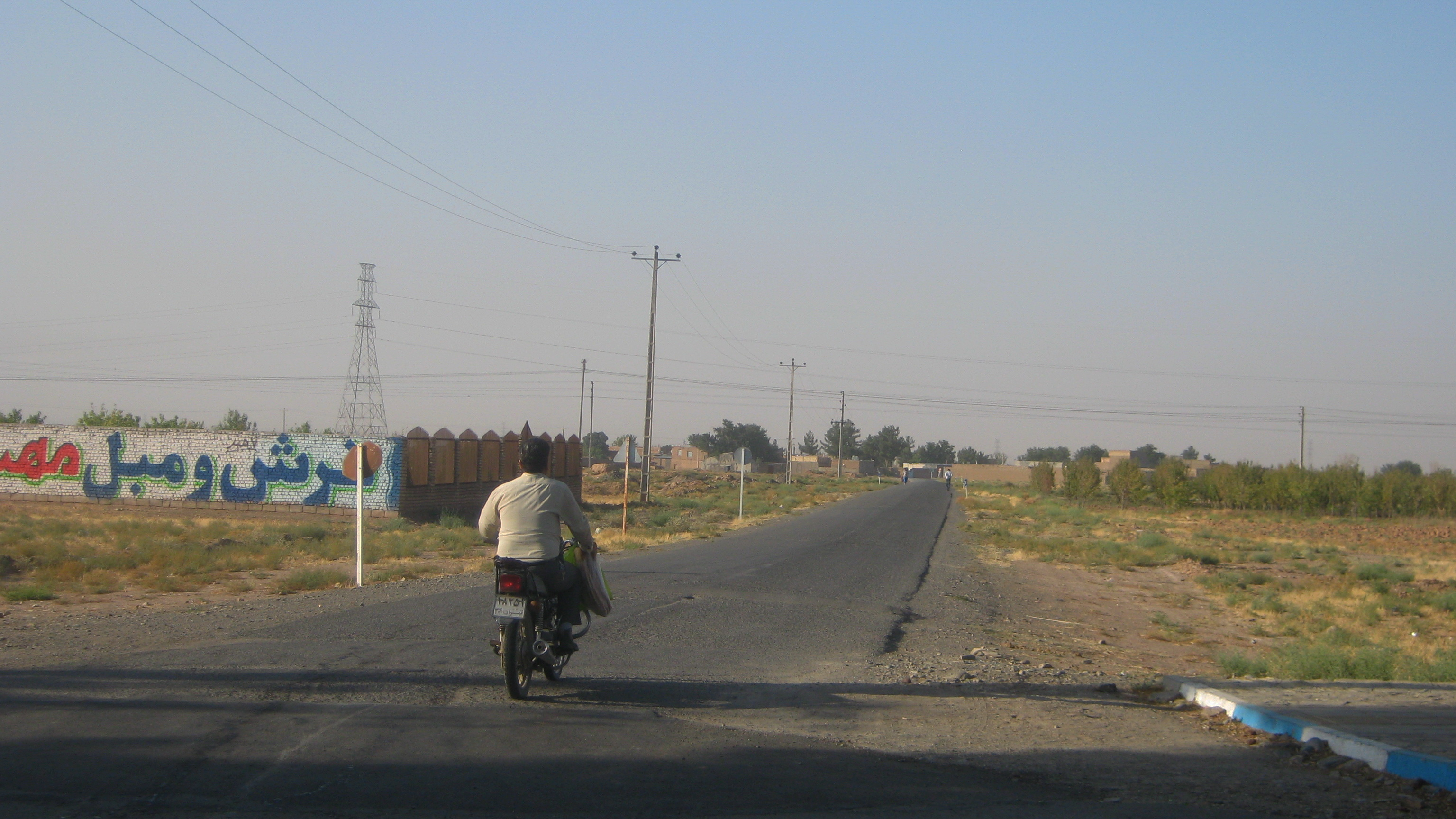
Road to Haqqiyeh village from Erfan street, southwestern suburbs of Nishapur, near AttarMausoleum

Haqqiyeh (Persian: حقيه, also Romanized as Ḩaqqīyeh) is a village in Darbqazi Rural District, in the Central District of Nishapur County, Razavi Khorasan Province, Iran. At the 2006 census, its population was 354, in 86 families.
