= Khvajeh Bachcheh =

Khvajeh Bachcheh خواجه بچه
- Village
- Location within Iran
- Coordinates: 36°16′40″N 58°41′20″E
- Country: Iran
- Province: Razavi Khorasan
- County: Nishapur
- Bakhsh: Central
- Rural District: Mazul

Population (2006)
  - Total: 208
- Time zone: UTC+3:30 (IRST)
  - Summer (DST): UTC+4:30 (IRDT)

Khvajeh Bachcheh (Persian: خواجه بچه, also Romanized as Khvājeh Bachcheh and Khavājeh Bachcheh) is a village in Mazul Rural District, in the Central District of Nishapur County, Razavi Khorasan Province, Iran. At the 2006 census, its population was 208, in 52 families.
