= Honarstan-e Kashavarzi, Razavi Khorasan =

Honarstan-e Kashavarzi هنرستان كشاورزي
- Village
- Country: Iran
- Province: Razavi Khorasan
- County: Nishapur
- Bakhsh: Central
- Rural District: Mazul

Population (2006)
  - Total: 31
- Time zone: UTC+3:30 (IRST)
  - Summer (DST): UTC+4:30 (IRDT)

Honarstan-e Kashavarzi (Persian: هنرستان كشاورزي, also Romanized as Honarstān-e Kashāvarzī) is a village in Mazul Rural District, in the Central District of Nishapur County, Razavi Khorasan Province, Iran. At the 2006 census, its population was 31, in 9 families.
