= Darbehesht =

Darbehesht (Persian: دربهشت) may refer to:

- Darbehesht, Fazl
- Darbehesht, Mazul
