= Taht-e Manzar =

Iranian village in Razavi Khorasan Province

Taht-e Manzar تحت منظر
- Village
- Location within Iran
- Coordinates: 36°13′55″N 58°57′18″E
- Country: Iran
- Province: Razavi Khorasan
- County: Nishapur
- Bakhsh: Central
- Rural District: Fazl

Population (2006)
  - Total: 69
- Time zone: UTC+3:30 (IRST)
  - Summer (DST): UTC+4:30 (IRDT)

Taht-e Manzar (Persian: تحت منظر, also Romanized as Taḩt-e Manz̧ar) is a village in Fazl Rural District, in the Central District of Nishapur County, Razavi Khorasan Province, Iran. At the 2006 census, its population was 69, in 16 families.
