= Zarandeh =

Zarandeh (Persian: زرنده) may refer to:

- Zarandeh, Binalud
- Zarandeh, Mazul
