= Boshrabad =

Village in Razavi Khorasan province, Iran

Boshrabad Persian: بشراباد
- Village
- Location within Iran
- Coordinates: 36°15′09″N 58°52′41″E
- Country: Iran
- Province: Razavi Khorasan
- County: Nishapur
- District: Central
- Rural District: Fazl

Population (2016)
  - Total: 1,212
- Time zone: UTC+3:30 (IRST)

Boshrabad (Persian: بشراباد) (Note: Also romanized as Boshrābād) is a village in Fazl Rural District of the Central District in Nishapur County, Razavi Khorasan province, Iran.

== Demographics ==
=== Population ===
At the time of the 2006 National Census, the village's population was 1,123 in 294 households. The following census in 2011 counted 1,263 people in 363 households. The 2016 census measured the population of the village as 1,212 people in 394 households.
