= Jilu, Iran =

Village in Razavi Khorasan province, Iran

Jilu Persian: جيلو
- Village
- Location within Iran
- Coordinates: 36°07′25″N 58°53′23″E
- Country: Iran
- Province: Razavi Khorasan
- County: Nishapur
- District: Central
- Rural District: Darbqazi

Population (2016)
  - Total: 539
- Time zone: UTC+3:30 (IRST)

Jilu (Persian: جيلو) (Note: Also romanized as Jīlū) is a village in Darbqazi Rural District of the Central District in Nishapur County, Razavi Khorasan province, Iran.

== Demographics ==
=== Population ===
At the time of the 2006 National Census, the village's population was 608 in 161 households. The following census in 2011 counted 559 people in 183 households. The 2016 census measured the population of the village as 539 people in 192 households.
