= Shahrak, Nishapur =

Village in Razavi Khorasan province, Iran

Shahrak Persian: شهرك
- Village
- Location within Iran
- Coordinates: 36°12′58″N 58°45′42″E
- Country: Iran
- Province: Razavi Khorasan
- County: Nishapur
- District: Central
- Rural District: Mazul

Population (2016)
  - Total: 2,530
- Time zone: UTC+3:30 (IRST)

Shahrak (Persian: شهرک) is a village in Mazul Rural District of the Central District in Nishapur County, Razavi Khorasan province, Iran.

== Demographics ==
=== Population ===
At the time of the 2006 National Census, the village's population was 2,164 in 554 households. The following census in 2011 counted 2,601 people in 732 households. The 2016 census measured the population of the village as 2,530 people in 723 households.
