= Mirabad, Mazul =

Village in Razavi Khorasan province, Iran

Mirabad Persian: ميراباد
- Village
- Location within Iran
- Coordinates: 36°17′59″N 58°48′31″E
- Country: Iran
- Province: Razavi Khorasan
- County: Nishapur
- District: Central
- Rural District: Mazul

Population (2016)
  - Total: 2,646
- Time zone: UTC+3:30 (IRST)

Mirabad (Persian: ميراباد) (Note: Also romanized as Mīrābād; also known as Mehrābād and Mihrābād) is a village in Mazul Rural District of the Central District in Nishapur County, Razavi Khorasan province, Iran.

== Demographics ==
=== Population ===
At the time of the 2006 National Census, the village's population was 2,331 in 581 households. The following census in 2011 counted 2,852 people in 757 households. The 2016 census measured the population of the village as 2,646 people in 848 households.
