= Shad Mehrak =

Village in Razavi Khorasan province, Iran

Shad Mehrak Persian: شادمهرك
- Village
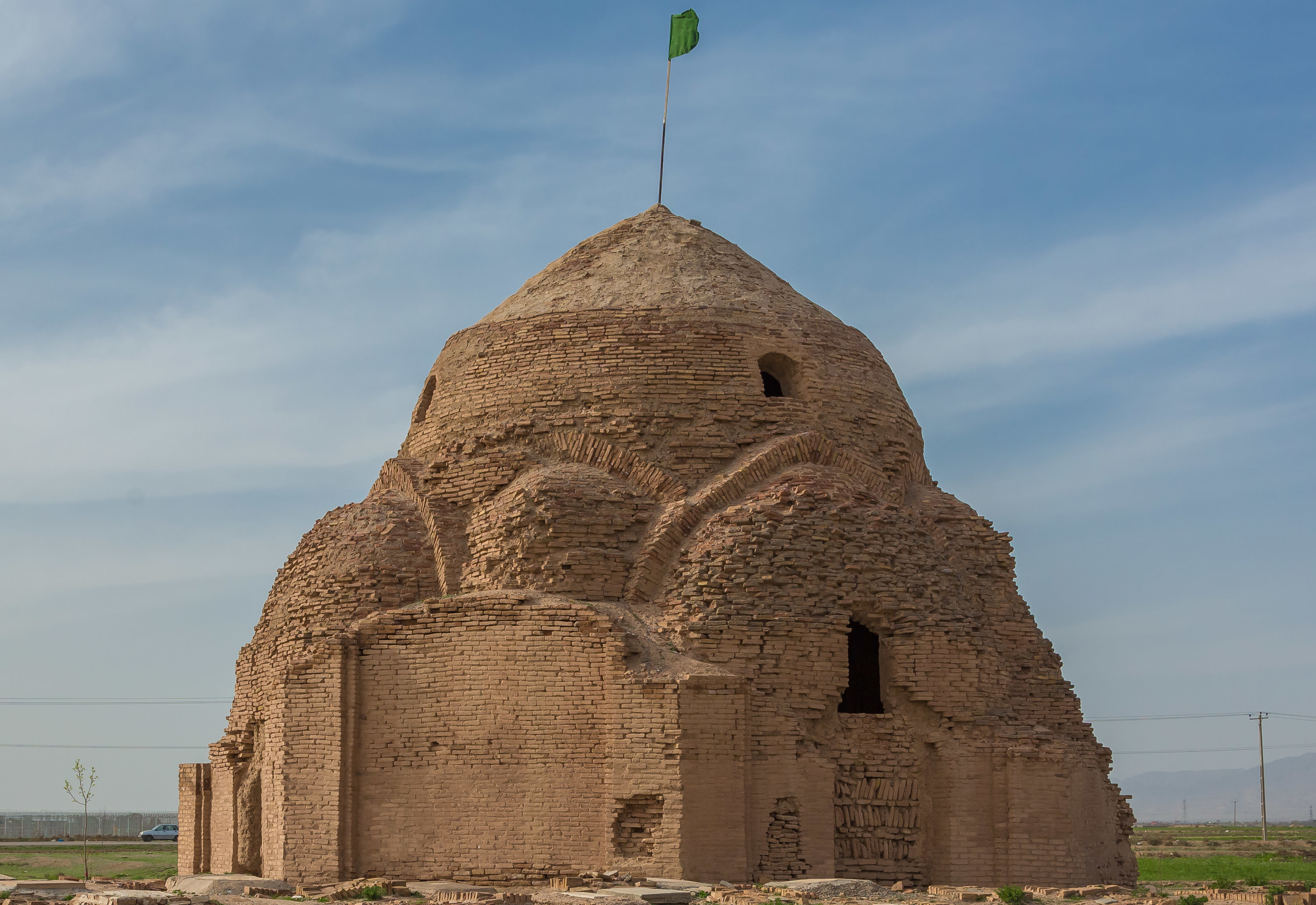
- Mehrabad Tower, near Shad Mehrak (built in the Ilkhanate period of Persia)

- Location within Iran
- Coordinates: 36°10′23″N 58°45′49″E
- Country: Iran
- Province: Razavi Khorasan
- County: Nishapur
- District: Central
- Rural District: Rivand

Population (2016)
  - Total: 677
- Time zone: UTC+3:30 (IRST)

Shad Mehrak (Persian: شادمهرك) (Note: Also romanized as Shād Mehrak; also known as Mehrābād (مهراباد)) is a village in, and the capital of, Rivand Rural District in the Central District of Nishapur County, Razavi Khorasan province, Iran.

== Demographics ==
=== Population ===
At the time of the 2006 National Census, the village's population was 694 in 166 households. The following census in 2011 counted 757 people in 209 households. The 2016 census measured the population of the village as 677 people in 213 households.

== See also ==
- Great Dome of Mehrabad
