= Deh-e Darugheh =

Village in Razavi Khorasan province, Iran

Deh-e Darugheh Persian: ده داروغه
- Village
- Location within Iran
- Coordinates: 36°12′18″N 58°43′52″E
- Country: Iran
- Province: Razavi Khorasan
- County: Nishapur
- District: Central
- Rural District: Rivand

Population (2016)
  - Total: 157
- Time zone: UTC+3:30 (IRST)

Deh-e Darugheh (Persian: ده داروغه) (Note: Also romanized as Deh-e Dārūgheh) is a village in Rivand Rural District of the Central District in Nishapur County, Razavi Khorasan province, Iran.

== Demographics ==
=== Population ===
At the time of the 2006 National Census, the village's population was 102 in 27 households. The following census in 2011 counted 126 people in 36 households. The 2016 census reported the population of the village as 157 people in 49 households.
