= Yahyaabad, Fazl =

Village in Razavi Khorasan province, Iran

Yahyaabad Persian: يحيي اباد
- Village
- Location within Iran
- Country: Iran
- Province: Razavi Khorasan
- County: Nishapur
- District: Central
- Rural District: Fazl

Population (2016)
  - Total: 527
- Time zone: UTC+3:30 (IRST)

Yahyaabad (Persian: يحيي اباد) (Note: Also romanized as Yaḩyáābād) is a village in Fazl Rural District of the Central District in Nishapur County, Razavi Khorasan province, Iran.

== Demographics ==
=== Population ===
At the time of the 2006 National Census, the village's population was 320 in 91 households. The following census in 2011 counted 453 people in 143 households. The 2016 census measured the population of the village as 527 people in 172 households.
