= Deh-e Hallaj =

Village in Razavi Khorasan province, Iran

Deh-e Hallaj Persian: ده حلاج
- Village
- Location within Iran
- Coordinates: 36°13′30″N 58°45′33″E
- Country: Iran
- Province: Razavi Khorasan
- County: Nishapur
- District: Central
- Rural District: Mazul

Population (2016)
  - Total: 1,001
- Time zone: UTC+3:30 (IRST)

Deh-e Hallaj (Persian: ده حلاج) (Note: Also romanized as Deh-e Ḩallāj) is a village in Mazul Rural District of the Central District in Nishapur County, Razavi Khorasan province, Iran.

== Demographics ==
=== Population ===
At the time of the 2006 National Census, the village's population was 565 in 150 households. The following census in 2011 counted 626 people in 199 households. The 2016 census measured the population of the village as 1,001 people in 308 households.
