= Qatnabad =

Village in Razavi Khorasan province, Iran

Qatnabad Persian: قطن اباد
- Village
- Location within Iran
- Coordinates: 36°14′19″N 58°42′40″E
- Country: Iran
- Province: Razavi Khorasan
- County: Nishapur
- District: Central
- Rural District: Mazul

Population (2016)
  - Total: 1,612
- Time zone: UTC+3:30 (IRST)

Qatnabad (Persian: قطن اباد) (Note: Also romanized as Qaţnābād) is a village in, and the capital of, Mazul Rural District in the Central District of Nishapur County, Razavi Khorasan province, Iran.

== Demographics ==
=== Population ===
At the time of the 2006 National Census, the village's population was 1,352 in 347 households. The following census in 2011 counted 1,624 people in 485 households. The 2016 census measured the population of the village as 1,612 people in 505 households.
