= Hakimabad, Nishapur =

Village in Razavi Khorasan province, Iran

Hakimabad Persian: حكيم اباد
- Village
- Location within Iran
- Coordinates: 36°11′37″N 58°44′11″E
- Country: Iran
- Province: Razavi Khorasan
- County: Nishapur
- District: Central
- Rural District: Rivand

Population (2016)
  - Total: 156
- Time zone: UTC+3:30 (IRST)

Hakimabad (Persian: حكيم اباد) (Note: Also romanized as Ḩakīmābād) is a village in Rivand Rural District of the Central District in Nishapur County, Razavi Khorasan province, Iran.

== Demographics ==
=== Population ===
At the time of the 2006 National Census, the village's population was 149 in 41 households. The following census in 2011 counted 161 people in 44 households. The 2016 census reported the population of the village as 156 people in 48 households.
