= Bagh-e Jafarabad =

Village in Razavi Khorasan province, Iran

Bagh-e Jafarabad Persian: باغ جعفراباد
- Village
- Location within Iran
- Coordinates: 36°05′18″N 58°55′12″E
- Country: Iran
- Province: Razavi Khorasan
- County: Nishapur
- District: Central
- Rural District: Darbqazi

Population (2016)
  - Total: 356
- Time zone: UTC+3:30 (IRST)

Bagh-e Jafarabad (Persian: باغ جعفراباد) (Note: Also romanized as Bāgh-e Ja‘farābād) is a village in Darbqazi Rural District of the Central District in Nishapur County, Razavi Khorasan province, Iran.

== Demographics ==
=== Population ===
At the time of the 2006 National Census, the village's population was 317 in 87 households. The following census in 2011 counted 324 people in 100 households. The 2016 census measured the population of the village as 356 people in 109 households.
