= Qaleh Now-e Khaleseh =

Qaleh Now-e Khaleseh (Persian: قلعه نوخالصه) may refer to:

- Qaleh Now-e Khaleseh, Razavi Khorasan
- Qaleh Now-e Khaleseh, Semnan
- Qaleh Now-e Khaleseh, Tehran
