= Khujan =

Village in Razavi Khorasan province, Iran

Khujan Persian: خوجان
- Village
- Location within Iran
- Coordinates: 36°06′32″N 58°50′42″E
- Country: Iran
- Province: Razavi Khorasan
- County: Nishapur
- District: Central
- Rural District: Darbqazi

Population (2016)
  - Total: 533
- Time zone: UTC+3:30 (IRST)

Khujan (Persian: خوجان) (Note: Also romanized as Khūjān; also known as Kharjān and Khūrjān) is a village in, and the capital of, Darbqazi Rural District in the Central District of Nishapur County, Razavi Khorasan province, Iran.

== Demographics ==
=== Population ===
At the time of the 2006 National Census, the village's population was 593 in 146 households. The following census in 2011 counted 583 people in 180 households. The 2016 census measured the population of the village as 533 people in 177 households.
