= Mohitabad =

Village in Razavi Khorasan province, Iran

Mohitabad Persian: محيطاباد
- Village
- Location within Iran
- Coordinates: 36°11′06″N 58°44′50″E
- Country: Iran
- Province: Razavi Khorasan
- County: Nishapur
- District: Central
- Rural District: Rivand

Population (2016)
  - Total: 920
- Time zone: UTC+3:30 (IRST)

Mohitabad (Persian: محيطاباد) (Note: Also romanized as Moḩīţābād; also known as Mahītabād and Moḩīţābād-e Seyyedhā) is a village in Rivand Rural District of the Central District in Nishapur County, Razavi Khorasan province, Iran.

== Demographics ==
=== Population ===
At the time of the 2006 National Census, the village's population was 876 in 227 households. The following census in 2011 counted 1,020 people in 309 households. The 2016 census reported the population of the village as 920 people in 291 households.
