= Baghishan =

Baghishan may refer to:

- Baghshan
- Baghshan-e Gach
