= Bahrudi =

Village in Razavi Khorasan province, Iran

Bahrudi Persian: بحرودي
- Village
- Location within Iran
- Coordinates: 36°09′22″N 58°49′24″E
- Country: Iran
- Province: Razavi Khorasan
- County: Nishapur
- District: Central
- Rural District: Darbqazi

Population (2016)
  - Total: 574
- Time zone: UTC+3:30 (IRST)

Bahrudi (Persian: بحرودي) (Note: Also romanized as Baḩrūdī) is a village in Darbqazi Rural District of the Central District in Nishapur County, Razavi Khorasan province, Iran.

== Demographics ==
=== Population ===
At the time of the 2006 National Census, the village's population was 615 in 159 households. The following census in 2011 counted 683 people in 200 households. The 2016 census measured the population of the village as 574 people in 175 households.
