= Hamidabad, Razavi Khorasan =

Village in Razavi Khorasan province, Iran

Hamidabad Persian: حميداباد
- Village
- Location within Iran
- Coordinates: 36°12′23″N 58°54′07″E
- Country: Iran
- Province: Razavi Khorasan
- County: Nishapur
- District: Central
- Rural District: Fazl

Population (2016)
  - Total: 916
- Time zone: UTC+3:30 (IRST)

Hamidabad (Persian: حميداباد) (Note: Also romanized as Ḩamīdābād) is a village in Fazl Rural District of the Central District in Nishapur County, Razavi Khorasan province, Iran.

== Demographics ==
=== Population ===
At the time of the 2006 National Census, the village's population was 711 in 201 households. The following census in 2011 counted 852 people in 266 households. The 2016 census measured the population of the village as 916 people in 286 households.

== Accessibility ==
This village and the village of Fushenjan are situated next to each other and are accessible by car from Road 44 of Iran along with different routes from the Baghrud Road of Nishapur (جاده باغرود نیشابور). They are also close to the capital city of the county, Nishapur, and Baghrud Road is used as their main pathway to the capital city.
