= Darbehesht, Fazl =

Darbehesht دربهشت
- Village
- Location within Iran
- Coordinates: 36°14′53″N 59°05′12″E
- Country: Iran
- Province: Razavi Khorasan
- County: Nishapur
- Bakhsh: Central
- Rural District: Fazl

Population (2006)
  - Total: 121
- Time zone: UTC+3:30 (IRST)
  - Summer (DST): UTC+4:30 (IRDT)

Darbehesht (Persian: دربهشت) is a village in Fazl Rural District, in the Central District of Nishapur County, Razavi Khorasan Province, Iran. At the 2006 census, its population was 121, in 31 families.
