= Mobarakeh, Nishapur =

Village in Razavi Khorasan province, Iran

Mobarakeh Persian: مباركه
- Village
- Location within Iran
- Coordinates: 36°10′41″N 58°46′23″E
- Country: Iran
- Province: Razavi Khorasan
- County: Nishapur
- District: Central
- Rural District: Rivand

Population (2016)
  - Total: 1,335
- Time zone: UTC+3:30 (IRST)

Mobarakeh (Persian: مباركه) (Note: Also romanized as Mobārakeh) is a village in Rivand Rural District of the Central District in Nishapur County, Razavi Khorasan province, Iran.

== Demographics ==
=== Population ===
At the time of the 2006 National Census, the village's population was 1,268 in 310 households. The following census in 2011 counted 1,597 people in 434 households. The 2016 census reported the population of the village as 1,335 people in 380 households, the most populous in its rural district.
