= Nowruzabad, Nishapur =

Village in Razavi Khorasan province, Iran

Nowruzabad Persian: نوروزاباد
- Village
- Location within Iran
- Coordinates: 35°59′59″N 58°54′31″E
- Country: Iran
- Province: Razavi Khorasan
- County: Nishapur
- District: Central
- Rural District: Darbqazi

Population (2016)
  - Total: 960
- Time zone: UTC+3:30 (IRST)

Nowruzabad (Persian: نوروزاباد) (Note: Also romanized as Nowrūzābād) is a village in Darbqazi Rural District of the Central District in Nishapur County, Razavi Khorasan province, Iran.

== Demographics ==
=== Population ===
At the time of the 2006 National Census, the village's population was 951 in 233 households. The following census in 2011 counted 979 people in 281 households. The 2016 census measured the population of the village as 960 people in 299 households, the most populous in its rural district.
