= Karizak-e Kenar Kal =

Village in Razavi Khorasan province, Iran

Karizak-e Kenar Kal Persian: كاريزك كناركال
- Village
- Location within Iran
- Coordinates: 36°04′51″N 58°50′10″E
- Country: Iran
- Province: Razavi Khorasan
- County: Nishapur
- District: Central
- Rural District: Darbqazi

Population (2016)
  - Total: 485
- Time zone: UTC+3:30 (IRST)

Karizak-e Kenar Kal (Persian: كاريزك كناركال) (Note: Also romanized as Kārīzak-e Kenār Kāl; also known as Kārīzak, Kārīzak Kāl, and Kārīzak-e Kāl) is a village in Darbqazi Rural District of the Central District in Nishapur County, Razavi Khorasan province, Iran.

== Demographics ==
=== Population ===
At the time of the 2006 National Census, the village's population was 507 in 124 households. The following census in 2011 counted 482 people in 147 households. The 2016 census measured the population of the village as 485 people in 168 households.
