= Eslamabad-e Arab =

Village in Razavi Khorasan province, Iran

Eslamabad-e Arab Persian: اسلام ابادعرب
- Village
- Location within Iran
- Coordinates: 36°05′42″N 58°53′16″E
- Country: Iran
- Province: Razavi Khorasan
- County: Nishapur
- District: Central
- Rural District: Darbqazi

Population (2016)
  - Total: 301
- Time zone: UTC+3:30 (IRST)

Eslamabad-e Arab (Persian: اسلام ابادعرب) (Note: Also romanized as Eslāmābād-e ‘Arab; formerly known as Shāhābād-e ‘Arab (شاه ابادعرب); also known as Moslemābād and Shāhābād) is a village in Darbqazi Rural District of the Central District in Nishapur County, Razavi Khorasan province, Iran.

== Demographics ==
=== Population ===
At the time of the 2006 National Census, the village's population was 402 in 114 households. The following census in 2011 counted 355 people in 112 households. The 2016 census measured the population of the village as 301 people in 102 households.
