= Lotfabad, Nishapur =

Village in Razavi Khorasan province, Iran

Lotfabad Persian: لطف اباد
- Village
- Location within Iran
- Coordinates: 36°10′44″N 58°44′06″E
- Country: Iran
- Province: Razavi Khorasan
- County: Nishapur
- District: Central
- Rural District: Rivand

Population (2016)
  - Total: 918
- Time zone: UTC+3:30 (IRST)

Lotfabad (Persian: لطف اباد) (Note: Also romanized as Loţfābād) is a village in Rivand Rural District of the Central District in Nishapur County, Razavi Khorasan province, Iran.

== Demographics ==
=== Population ===
At the time of the 2006 National Census, the village's population was 854 in 238 households. The following census in 2011 counted 1,027 people in 316 households. The 2016 census reported the population of the village as 918 people in 303 households.
