= Golshan, Nishapur =

Village in Razavi Khorasan province, Iran

Golshan Persian: گلشن
- Village
- Location within Iran
- Coordinates: 36°11′06″N 58°41′09″E
- Country: Iran
- Province: Razavi Khorasan
- County: Nishapur
- District: Central
- Rural District: Rivand

Population (2016)
  - Total: 350
- Time zone: UTC+3:30 (IRST)

Golshan (Persian: گلشن) is a village in Rivand Rural District of the Central District in Nishapur County, Razavi Khorasan province, Iran.

== Demographics ==
=== Population ===
At the time of the 2006 National Census, the village's population was 344 in 85 households. The following census in 2011 counted 376 people in 110 households. The 2016 census reported the population of the village as 350 people in 111 households.
