= Sar Ab-e Kushk =

Village in Razavi Khorasan province, Iran

Sar Ab-e Kushk Persian: سراب كوشك
- Village
- Location within Iran
- Coordinates: 36°13′12″N 58°46′18″E
- Country: Iran
- Province: Razavi Khorasan
- County: Nishapur
- District: Central
- Rural District: Mazul

Population (2016)
  - Total: 2,069
- Time zone: UTC+3:30 (IRST)

Sar Ab-e Kushk (Persian: سراب كوشك) (Note: Also romanized as Sar Āb-e Kūshk) is a village in Mazul Rural District of the Central District in Nishapur County, Razavi Khorasan province, Iran.

== Demographics ==
=== Population ===
At the time of the 2006 National Census, the village's population was 1,705 in 446 households. The following census in 2011 counted 2,203 people in 646 households. The 2016 census measured the population of the village as 2,069 people in 607 households.
