= Rahmatabad, Nishapur =

Neighborhood in Razavi Khorasan province, Iran

Rahmatabad Persian: رحمت اباد
- Neighborhood
- Location within Iran
- Coordinates: 36°11′46″N 58°46′35″E
- Country: Iran
- Province: Razavi Khorasan
- County: Nishapur
- District: Central
- City: Nishapur

Population (2006)
  - Total: 1,194
- Time zone: UTC+3:30 (IRST)

Rahmatabad (Persian: رحمت اباد) (Note: Also romanized as Raḩmatābād; also known as Sīāh Qar) is a neighborhood in the city of Nishapur in the Central District of Nishapur County, Razavi Khorasan province, Iran.

== Demographics ==
=== Population ===
At the time of the 2006 National Census, Rahmatabad's population was 1,194 in 339 households, when it was a village in Rivand Rural District. After the census, it was annexed by the city of Nishapur.
