= Shadab, Razavi Khorasan =

Village in Razavi Khorasan province, Iran

Shadab Persian: شاداب
- Village
- Location within Iran
- Coordinates: 36°15′44″N 58°43′21″E
- Country: Iran
- Province: Razavi Khorasan
- County: Nishapur
- District: Central
- Rural District: Mazul

Population (2016)
  - Total: 1,247
- Time zone: UTC+3:30 (IRST)

Shadab (Persian: شاداب) (Note: Also romanized as Shādāb; also known as Shādāb Ja‘farābād) is a village in Mazul Rural District of the Central District in Nishapur County, Razavi Khorasan province, Iran.

== Demographics ==
=== Population ===
At the time of the 2006 National Census, the village's population was 1,426 in 367 households. The following census in 2011 counted 1,415 people in 421 households. The 2016 census measured the population of the village as 1,247 people in 425 households.
