= Halali =

Halali may refer to:

- Halali, Mashhad, a village in Iran
- Halali Airport, Oshikoto Region, Namibia
- Halali Reservoir, on the Halali River, Madhya Pradesh, India
- Halali, an area in Etosha National Park, Namibia
- "Halali", a 2018 episode of Die Kirche bleibt im Dorf

== People ==
- Esmail Halali (born 1973), Iranian football player and manager
- Salim Halali (1920–2005), Algerian singer

== See also ==
- Halaliʻi Lake, Hawaii, US
- Helali (disambiguation)
