= Kariz-e Sabah =

Village in Razavi Khorasan province, Iran

Kariz-e Sabah Persian: كاريزصباح
- Village
- Location within Iran
- Coordinates: 36°04′43″N 58°56′02″E
- Country: Iran
- Province: Razavi Khorasan
- County: Nishapur
- District: Central
- Rural District: Darbqazi

Population (2016)
  - Total: 382
- Time zone: UTC+3:30 (IRST)

Kariz-e Sabah (Persian: كاريزصباح) (Note: Also romanized as Kārīz-e Şabāḩ) is a village in Darbqazi Rural District of the Central District in Nishapur County, Razavi Khorasan province, Iran.

== Demographics ==
=== Population ===
At the time of the 2006 National Census, the village's population was 434 in 107 households. The following census in 2011 counted 368 people in 107 households. The 2016 census measured the population of the village as 382 people in 118 households.
