= Feyzabad-e Lalaha =

Feyzabad-e Lalaha فيض ابادلالها
- Village
- Location within Iran
- Coordinates: 36°09′47″N 58°52′18″E
- Country: Iran
- Province: Razavi Khorasan
- County: Nishapur
- Bakhsh: Central
- Rural District: Fazl

Population (2006)
  - Total: 51
- Time zone: UTC+3:30 (IRST)
  - Summer (DST): UTC+4:30 (IRDT)

Feyzabad-e Lalaha (Persian: فيض ابادلالها, also Romanized as Feyẕābād-e Lālahā; also known as Rūstāi Feyẕābād-e Laleh Hā) is a village in Fazl Rural District, in the Central District of Nishapur County, Razavi Khorasan Province, Iran. At the 2006 census, its population was 51, in 13 families.
