= Ahangaran, Nishapur =

Village in Razavi Khorasan province, Iran

Ahangaran Persian: اهنگران
- Village
- Location within Iran
- Coordinates: 36°06′27″N 58°45′27″E
- Country: Iran
- Province: Razavi Khorasan
- County: Nishapur
- District: Central
- Rural District: Rivand

Population (2016)
  - Total: 209
- Time zone: UTC+3:30 (IRST)

Ahangaran (Persian: اهنگران) (Note: Also romanized as Āhangarān) is a village in Rivand Rural District of the Central District in Nishapur County, Razavi Khorasan province, Iran.

== Demographics ==
=== Population ===
At the time of the 2006 National Census, the village's population was 249 in 62 households. The following census in 2011 counted 249 people in 75 households. The 2016 census reported the population of the village as 209 people in 67 households.
