= Deh Now, Rivand =

Village in Razavi Khorasan province, Iran

Deh Now Persian: دهنو
- Village
- Location within Iran
- Coordinates: 36°07′55″N 58°45′18″E
- Country: Iran
- Province: Razavi Khorasan
- County: Nishapur
- District: Central
- Rural District: Rivand

Population (2016)
  - Total: 165
- Time zone: UTC+3:30 (IRST)

Deh Now (Persian: دهنو) is a village in Rivand Rural District of the Central District in Nishapur County, Razavi Khorasan province, Iran.

== Demographics ==
=== Population ===
At the time of the 2006 National Census, the village's population was 130 in 36 households. The following census in 2011 counted 104 people in 29 households. The 2016 census reported the population of the village as 165 people in 52 households.
