= Farkhak =

Village in Razavi Khorasan province, Iran

Farkhak Persian: فرخك
- Village
- Location within Iran
- Coordinates: 36°14′20″N 58°53′58″E
- Country: Iran
- Province: Razavi Khorasan
- County: Nishapur
- District: Central
- Rural District: Fazl

Population (2016)
  - Total: 1,469
- Time zone: UTC+3:30 (IRST)

Farkhak (Persian: فرخك) (Note: Also romanized as Farkhk) is a village in Fazl Rural District of the Central District in Nishapur County, Razavi Khorasan province, Iran. The village is situated next to Baghrud, one of the biggest campgrounds in the country.

== Demographics ==
=== Population ===
At the time of the 2006 National Census, the village's population was 1,434 in 405 households. The following census in 2011 counted 1,644 people in 468 households. The 2016 census measured the population of the village as 1,469 people in 440 households, the most populous village in its rural district.
