= Abu Sadi =

Village in Razavi Khorasan province, Iran

Abu Sadi Persian: ابوسعدي
- Village
- Location within Iran
- Coordinates: 36°10′39″N 58°53′08″E
- Country: Iran
- Province: Razavi Khorasan
- County: Nishapur
- District: Central
- Rural District: Fazl

Population (2016)
  - Total: 740
- Time zone: UTC+3:30 (IRST)

Abu Sadi (Persian: ابوسعدي) (Note: Also romanized as Abū Sa‘dī) is a village in, and the capital of, Fazl Rural District in the Central District of Nishapur County, Razavi Khorasan province, Iran.

== Demographics ==
=== Population ===
At the time of the 2006 National Census, the village's population was 992 in 264 households. The following census in 2011 counted 1,040 people in 318 households. The 2016 census measured the population of the village as 740 people in 216 households.
