= Deh Sheykh, Razavi Khorasan =

Village in Razavi Khorasan province, Iran

Deh Sheykh Persian: ده شيخ
- Village
- Location within Iran
- Coordinates: 36°11′07″N 58°49′46″E
- Country: Iran
- Province: Razavi Khorasan
- County: Nishapur
- District: Central
- Rural District: Fazl

Population (2016)
  - Total: 576
- Time zone: UTC+3:30 (IRST)

Deh Sheykh (Persian: ده شيخ) is a village in Fazl Rural District of the Central District in Nishapur County, Razavi Khorasan province, Iran.

== Demographics ==
=== Population ===
At the time of the 2006 National Census, the village's population was 603 in 169 households. The following census in 2011 counted 684 people in 208 households. The 2016 census measured the population of the village as 576 people in 181 households.
