= Hoseynabad-e Jadid, Razavi Khorasan =

Village in Razavi Khorasan province, Iran

Hoseynabad-e Jadid Persian: حسين ابادجديد
- Village
- Location within Iran
- Coordinates: 36°11′58″N 58°49′53″E
- Country: Iran
- Province: Razavi Khorasan
- County: Nishapur
- District: Central
- Rural District: Fazl

Population (2016)
  - Total: 546
- Time zone: UTC+3:30 (IRST)

Hoseynabad-e Jadid (Persian: حسين ابادجديد) (Note: Also romanized as Ḩoseynābād-e Jadīd; also known as Ḩoseynābād) is a village in Fazl Rural District of the Central District in Nishapur County, Razavi Khorasan province, Iran.

== Demographics ==
=== Population ===
At the time of the 2006 National Census, the village's population was 237 in 69 households. The following census in 2011 counted 414 people in 127 households. The 2016 census measured the population of the village as 546 people in 161 households.
