= Fushenjan =

Village in Razavi Khorasan province, Iran

Fushenjan Persian: فوشنجان
- Village
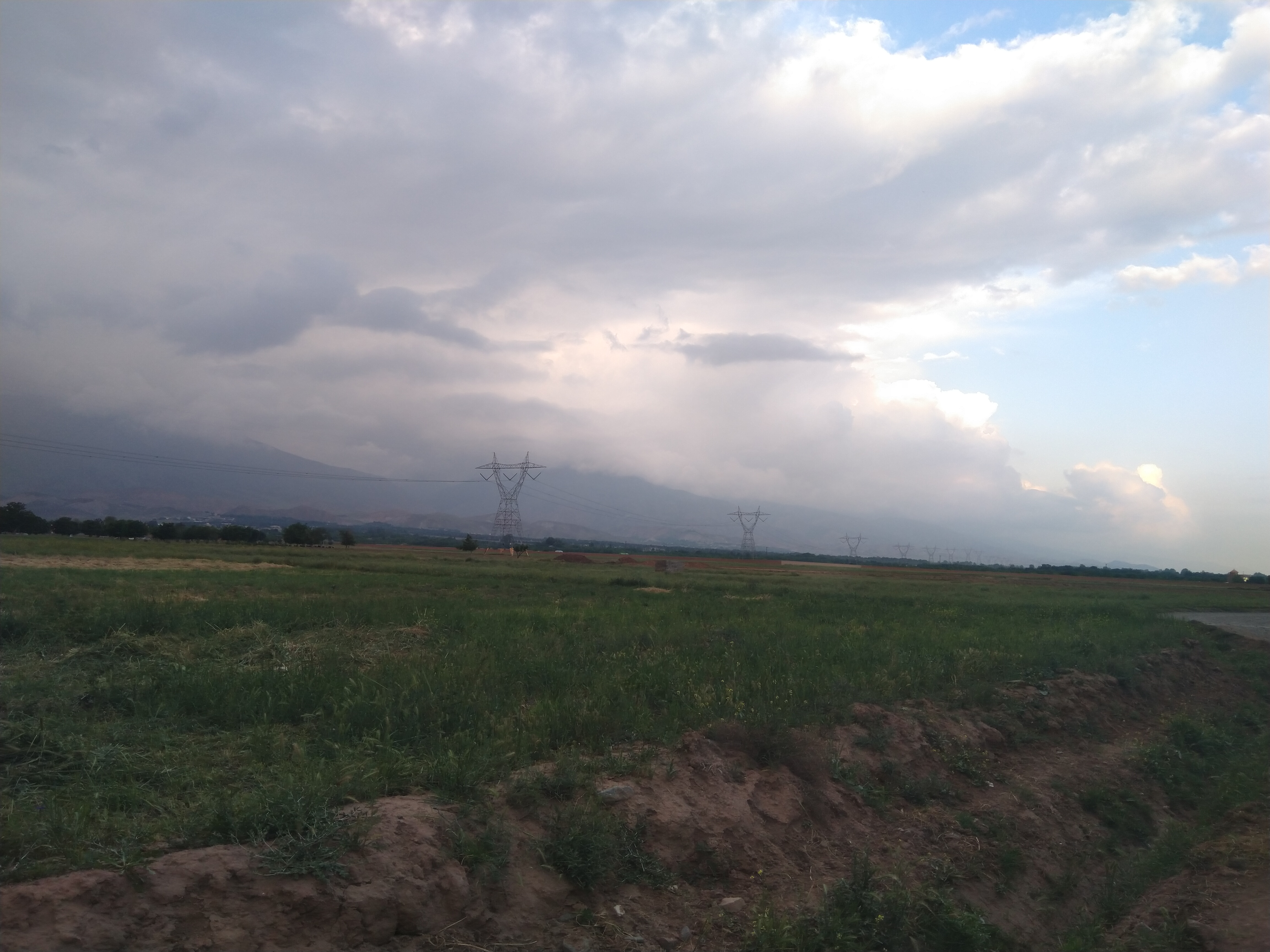
- The northern and western gardens of Fushenjan are visible in the right corner of the picture, taken from a dirt road accessible from the Baghrud Road of Nishapur

- Location within Iran
- Coordinates: 36°12′39″N 58°53′40″E
- Country: Iran
- Province: Razavi Khorasan
- County: Nishapur
- District: Central
- Rural District: Fazl

Population (2016)
  - Total: 878
- Time zone: UTC+3:30 (IRST)

Fushenjan (Persian: فوشنجان) (Note: Also romanized as Fūshenjān; also known as Pushtanghan (پشتنقان) or Pushenjan (پوشنجان) in the historic sources of The Quarter of Nishapur (ربع نیشابور)) is a village in Fazl Rural District of the Central District in Nishapur County, Razavi Khorasan province, Iran.

== Demographics ==
=== Population ===
At the time of the 2006 National Census, the village's population was 1,457 in 421 households. The following census in 2011 counted 1,341 people in 422 households. The 2016 census measured the population of the village as 878 people in 291 households.

== Overview ==
This village has been claimed to be the birthplace of Haji Bektash Veli by Ministry of Cultural Heritage, Handicrafts and Tourism of Iran and is home to Baktash Archaeological Site of Nishapur which was uncovered by an archeological group led by the archeological department of the University of Neyshabur in an archeological excavation project initiated in the year 2016. This site is part of the Iran National Heritage list with the national registration number of 24383. There is no historical source or record which implies that Bektash was really born in Fushenjan. The cited websites clearly show that the Iranian government invented the place for tourist attraction and missionary activity.

== Accessibility ==
This village and the village of Hamidabad are situated next to each other and are accessible by car from the road 44 of Iran along with different routes from the Baghrud Road of Nishapur (Persian: جاده باغرود نیشابور). They are also really close to the capital city of the county, Nishapur and a road known as the Baghrud Road is used as their main pathway to the capital city.
