= Deh Now-e Khaleseh =

Village in Razavi Khorasan province, Iran

Deh Now-e Khaleseh Persian: دهنو خالصه
- Village
- Location within Iran
- Coordinates: 36°13′54″N 58°46′25″E
- Country: Iran
- Province: Razavi Khorasan
- County: Nishapur
- District: Central
- Rural District: Mazul

Population (2016)
  - Total: 1,649
- Time zone: UTC+3:30 (IRST)

Deh Now-e Khaleseh (Persian: دهنو خالصه) (Note: Also romanized as Deh Now Khāleşeh, Deh Now-e Khāleşeh, Deh Now-ye Khaleseh, and Deh Now-ye Khāleşeh; also known as Deh Nau, Deh Now, Deh Now-ye Kenār Gūsheh, and Deh-i-Nau) is a village in Mazul Rural District of the Central District in Nishapur County, Razavi Khorasan province, Iran.

== Demographics ==
=== Population ===
At the time of the 2006 National Census, the village's population was 2,519 in 657 households. The following census in 2011 counted 2,305 people in 698 households. The 2016 census measured the population of the village as 1,649 people in 509 households.
