= Mozaffarabad, Nishapur =

Village in Razavi Khorasan province, Iran

Mozaffarabad Persian: مظفرآباد
- Village
- Location within Iran
- Coordinates: 36°11′57″N 58°43′38″E
- Country: Iran
- Province: Razavi Khorasan
- County: Nishapur
- District: Central
- Rural District: Rivand

Population (2016)
  - Total: 162
- Time zone: UTC+3:30 (IRST)

Mozaffarabad (Persian: مظفرآباد) (Note: Also romanized as Moz̧affarābād) is a village in Rivand Rural District of the Central District in Nishapur County, Razavi Khorasan province, Iran.

== Demographics ==
=== Population ===
At the time of the 2006 National Census, the village's population was 144 in 43 households. The following census in 2011 counted 153 people in 51 households. The 2016 census reported the population of the village as 162 people in 52 households.
