= Deh Now-e Kharabeh =

Neighborhood in Razavi Khorasan province, Iran

Deh Now-e Kharabeh Persian: ده نوخرابه
- Neighborhood
- Location within Iran
- Country: Iran
- Province: Razavi Khorasan
- County: Nishapur
- District: Central
- City: Nishapur

Population (2006)
  - Total: 1,831
- Time zone: UTC+3:30 (IRST)

Deh Now-e Kharabeh (Persian: ده نوخرابه) (Note: Also romanized as Deh Now-e Kharābeh, Deh Now-e Kherabeh, and Deh Now-e Kherābeh; also known as Deh Now) is a neighborhood in the city of Nishapur in the Central District of Nishapur County, Razavi Khorasan province, Iran.

== Demographics ==
=== Population ===
At the time of the 2006 National Census, Deh Now-e Kharabeh's population was 1,831 in 425 households, when it was a village in Rivand Rural District. After the census, it was annexed by the city of Nishapur.
