= Buzhabad =

Village in Razavi Khorasan province, Iran

Buzhabad Persian: بوژاباد
- Village
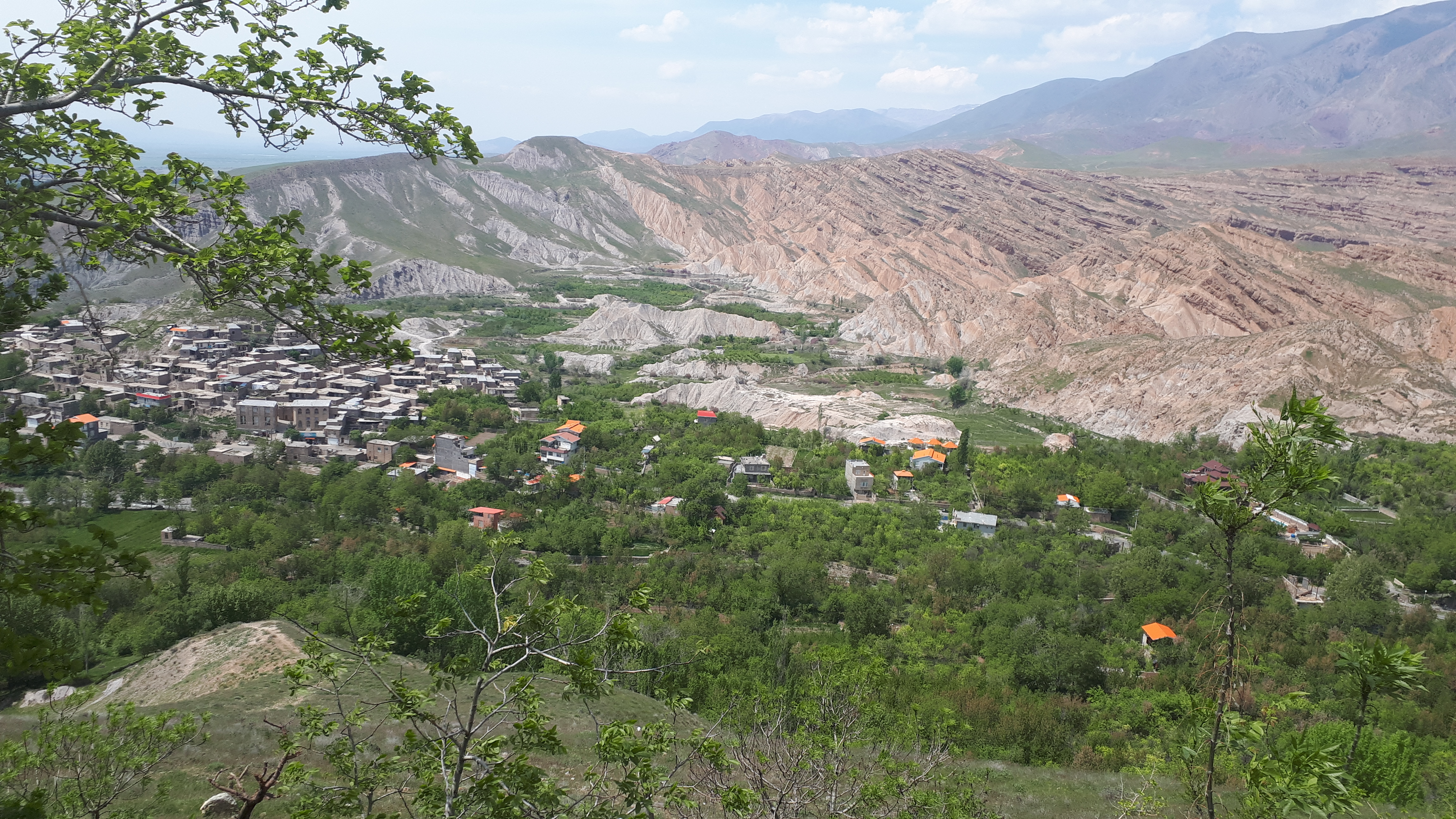
- The village of Buzhabad

- Location within Iran
- Coordinates: 36°13′44″N 58°57′06″E
- Country: Iran
- Province: Razavi Khorasan
- County: Nishapur
- District: Central
- Rural District: Fazl

Population (2016)
  - Total: 569
- Time zone: UTC+3:30 (IRST)

Buzhabad (Persian: بوژاباد) (Note: Also romanized as Būzhābād) is a village in Fazl Rural District of the Central District in Nishapur County, Razavi Khorasan province, Iran.

== Demographics ==
=== Population ===
At the time of the 2006 National Census, the village's population was 644 in 197 households. The following census in 2011 counted 649 people in 218 households. The 2016 census measured the population of the village as 569 people in 205 households.
