= Kejan =

Village in Isfahan province, Iran

Kejan Persian: كجان
- Village
- Location within Iran
- Coordinates: 32°53′21″N 52°40′17″E
- Country: Iran
- Province: Isfahan
- County: Nain
- District: Central
- Rural District: Baharestan

Population (2016)
  - Total: 357
- Time zone: UTC+3:30 (IRST)

Kejan (Persian: كجان) (Note: Also romanized as Kajān and Kejān) is a village in, and the capital of, Baharestan Rural District in the Central District of Nain County, Isfahan province, Iran.

== Demographics ==
=== Population ===
At the time of the 2006 National Census, the village's population was 573 in 195 households. The following census in 2011 counted 413 people in 162 households. The 2016 census measured the population of the village as 357 people in 158 households, the most populous in its rural district.
