= Helali, Nishapur =

Village in Razavi Khorasan province, Iran

Helali Persian: هلالي
- Village
- Location within Iran
- Coordinates: 36°12′02″N 58°45′04″E
- Country: Iran
- Province: Razavi Khorasan
- County: Nishapur
- District: Central
- Rural District: Rivand

Population (2016)
  - Total: 642
- Time zone: UTC+3:30 (IRST)

Helali (Persian: هلالي) (Note: Also romanized as Helālī) is a village in Rivand Rural District of the Central District in Nishapur County, Razavi Khorasan province, Iran.

== Demographics ==
=== Population ===
At the time of the 2006 National Census, the village's population was 650 in 174 households. The following census in 2011 counted 858 people in 242 households. The 2016 census reported the population of the village as 642 people in 201 households.
