= Zarandeh, Mazul =

Village in Razavi Khorasan province, Iran

Zarandeh Persian: زرنده
- Village
- Location within Iran
- Coordinates: 36°13′19″N 58°45′14″E
- Country: Iran
- Province: Razavi Khorasan
- County: Nishapur
- District: Central
- Rural District: Mazul

Population (2016)
  - Total: 1,107
- Time zone: UTC+3:30 (IRST)

Zarandeh (Persian: زرنده) is a village in Mazul Rural District of the Central District in Nishapur County, Razavi Khorasan province, Iran.

== Demographics ==
=== Population ===
At the time of the 2006 National Census, the village's population was 458 in 116 households. The following census in 2011 counted 721 people in 194 households. The 2016 census measured the population of the village as 1,107 people in 329 households.
