= Bar, Razavi Khorasan =

City in Razavi Khorasan province, Iran

Bar Persian: بار
- City
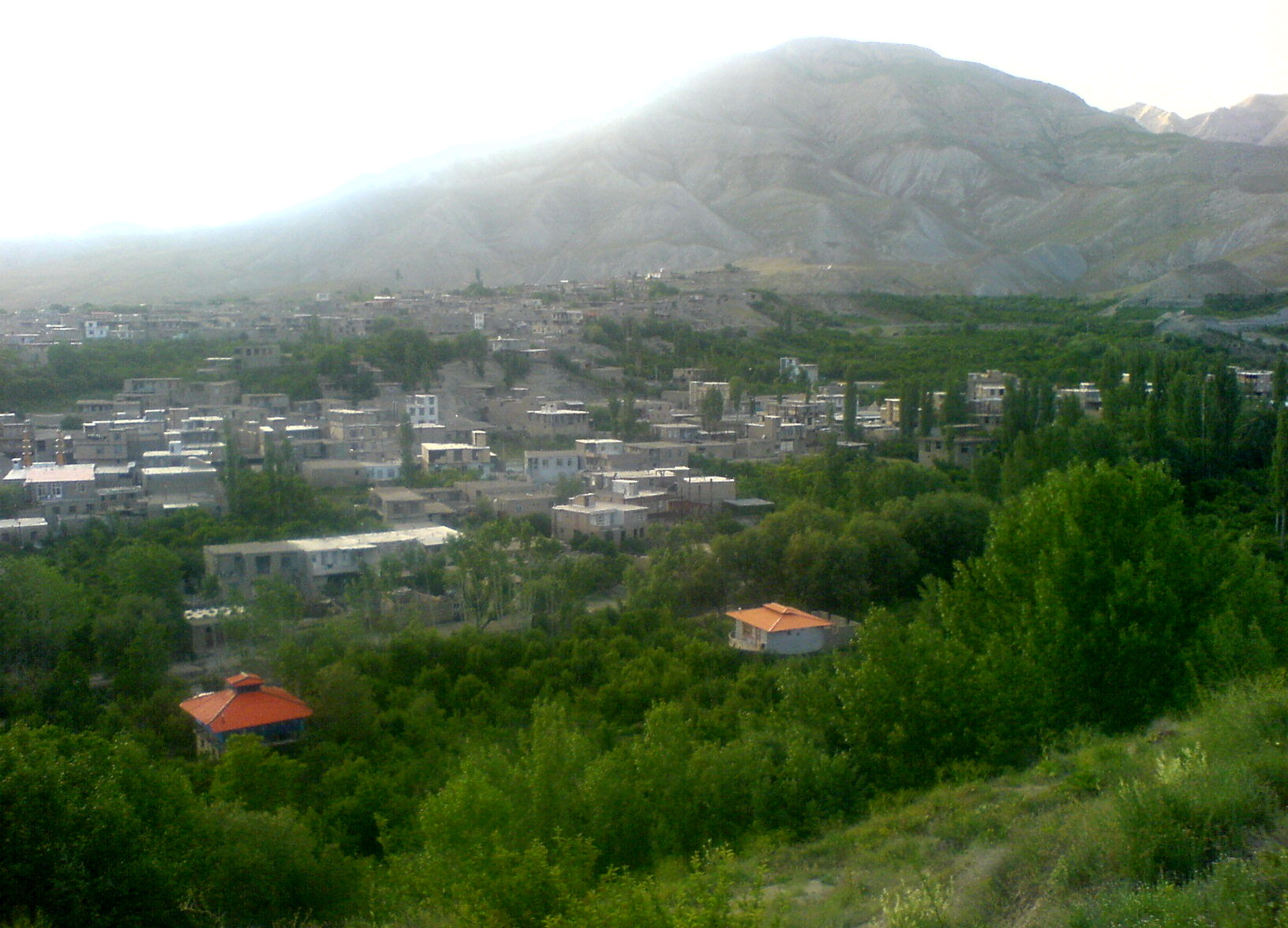
- The city of Bar

- Location within Iran
- Coordinates: 36°29′28″N 58°43′01″E
- Country: Iran
- Province: Razavi Khorasan
- County: Nishapur
- District: Central

Population (2016)
  - Total: 3,765
- Time zone: UTC+3:30 (IRST)

Bar (Persian: بار) (Note: Also romanized as Bār) is a city in the Central District of Nishapur County, Razavi Khorasan province, Iran.

== Demographics ==
=== Population ===
At the time of the 2006 National Census, Bar's population was 4,103 in 968 households, when it was a village in Firuzeh Rural District of the former Takht-e Jolgeh District. The following census in 2011 counted 4,121 people in 1,145 households, by which time the village had been converted to a city. It was transferred to the Central District. The 2016 census measured the population of the city as 3,765 people in 1,122 households.

== Geography ==
Bar's closest major cities are Nishapur and Firuzeh, the latter of which has become part of Firuzeh County. These cities are historically part of the Greater Region of the city of Nishapur, and its people have daily commute and connections with each other. A dam located near this city is used one of the main water sources of the city of Nishapur.

== Gallery ==
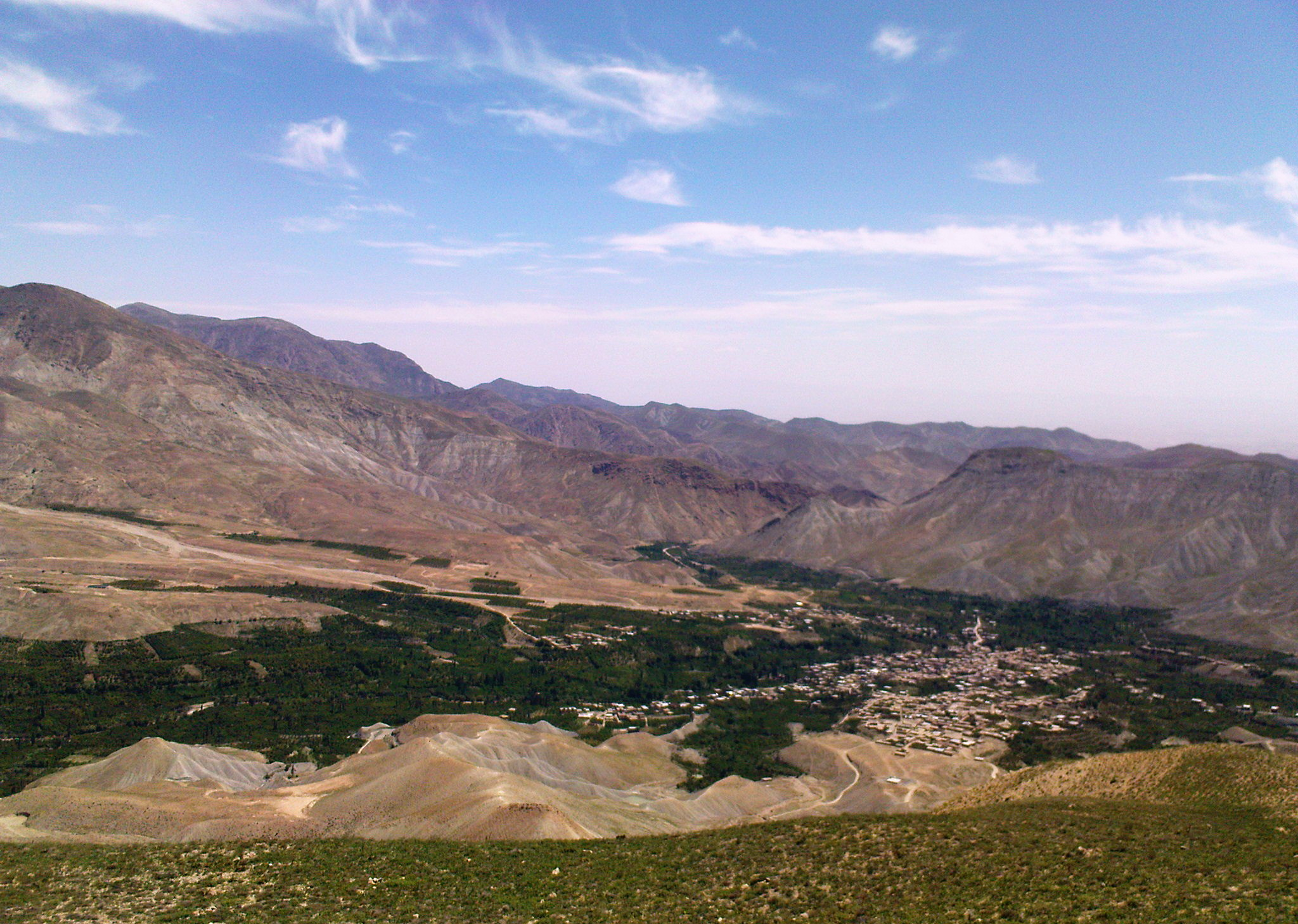

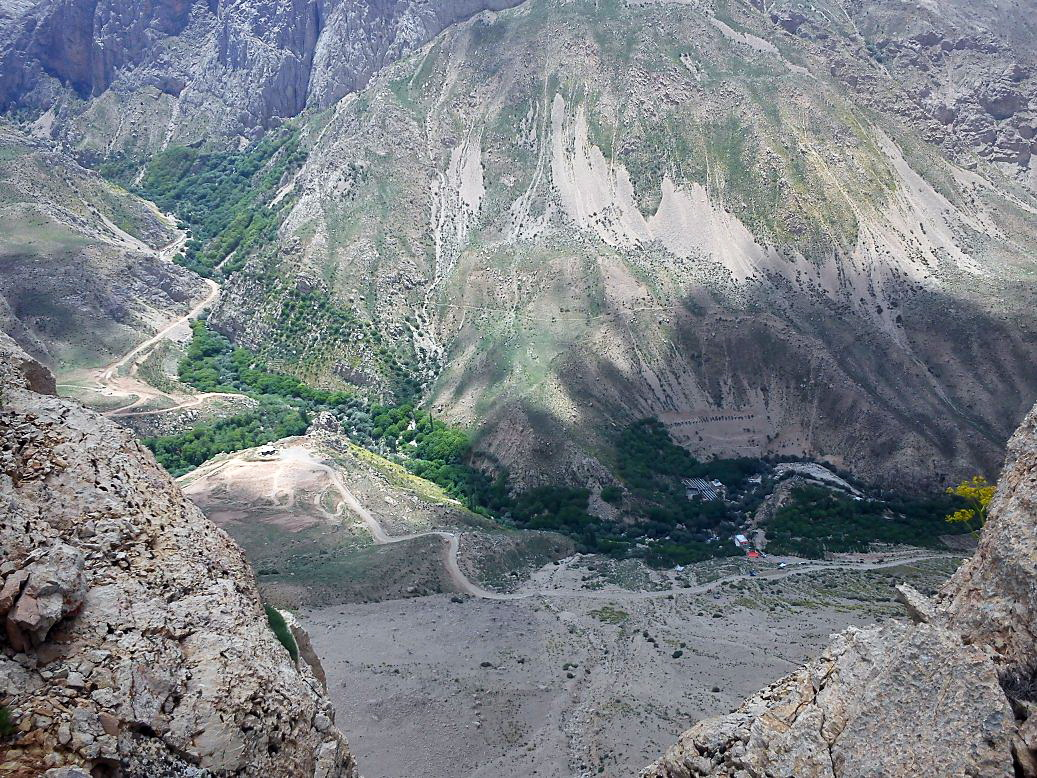

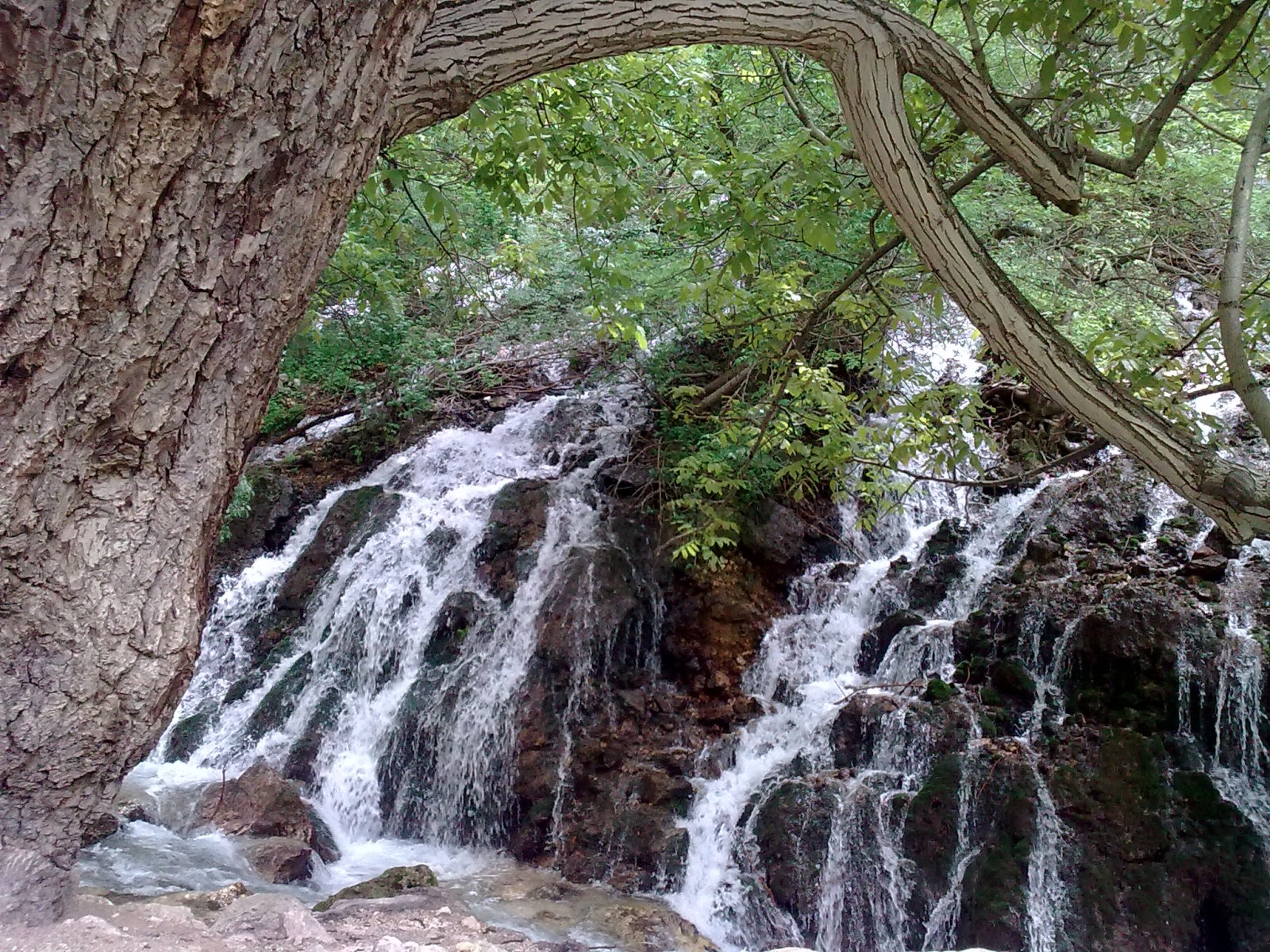
