= Kharvan =

Village in Isfahan province, Iran

Kharvan Persian: خاروان
- Village
- Location within Iran
- Coordinates: 32°52′31″N 52°39′41″E
- Country: Iran
- Province: Isfahan
- County: Nain
- District: Central
- Rural District: Baharestan

Population (2016)
  - Total: 63
- Time zone: UTC+3:30 (IRST)

Kharvan (Persian: خاروان) (Note: Also romanized as Khārvān) is a village in Baharestan Rural District of the Central District in Nain County, Isfahan province, Iran.

== Demographics ==
=== Population ===
At the time of the 2006 National Census, the village's population was 80 in 23 households. The following census in 2011 counted 58 people in 21 households. The 2016 census measured the population of the village as 63 people in 26 households.
