= Neyestanak =

Village in Isfahan province, Iran

Neyestanak Persian: نيستانك
- Village
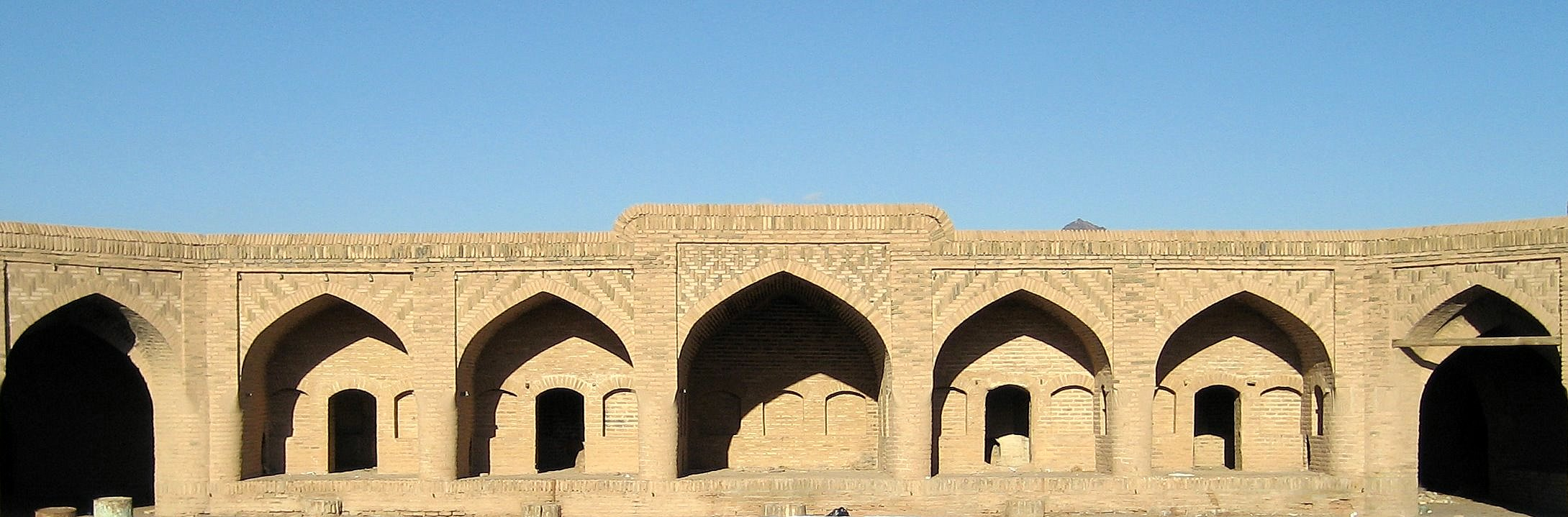
- Neyestanak caravanserai inner courtyard

- Location within Iran
- Coordinates: 32°58′09″N 52°48′03″E
- Country: Iran
- Province: Isfahan
- County: Nain
- District: Central
- Rural District: Baharestan

Population (2016)
  - Total: 291
- Time zone: UTC+3:30 (IRST)

Neyestanak (Persian: نيستانك) (Note: Also romanized as Neyestānak; also known as Naistānak) is a village in Baharestan Rural District of the Central District in Nain County, Isfahan province, Iran.

== Demographics ==
=== Population ===
At the time of the 2006 National Census, the village's population was 216 in 86 households. The following census in 2011 counted 276 people in 107 households. The 2016 census measured the population of the village as 291 people in 109 households.
