= Feyzabad, eastern Mazul =

Village in Razavi Khorasan province, Iran

Feyzabad Persian: فيض اباد
- Village
- Location within Iran
- Coordinates: 36°13′19″N 58°45′03″E
- Country: Iran
- Province: Razavi Khorasan
- County: Nishapur
- District: Central
- Rural District: Mazul

Population (2016)
  - Total: 2,414
- Time zone: UTC+3:30 (IRST)

Feyzabad (Persian: فيض اباد) (Note: Also romanized as Feyẕābād) is a village in Mazul Rural District of the Central District in Nishapur County, Razavi Khorasan province, Iran.

== Demographics ==
=== Population ===
At the time of the 2006 National Census, the village's population was 1,694 in 422 households. The following census in 2011 counted 2,615 people in 742 households. The 2016 census measured the population of the village as 2,414 people in 717 households.
