= Baghshan-e Gach =

Village in Razavi Khorasan province, Iran

Baghshan-e Gach Persian: باغشن گچ
- Village
- Location within Iran
- Coordinates: 36°18′13″N 58°45′33″E
- Country: Iran
- Province: Razavi Khorasan
- County: Nishapur
- District: Central
- Rural District: Mazul

Population (2016)
  - Total: 3,915
- Time zone: UTC+3:30 (IRST)

Baghshan-e Gach (Persian: باغشن گچ) (Note: Also romanized as Bāghshan Gach and Bāghshan-e Gach; also known as Bāghash Gach, Bāghash Kach, Baghīshan, and Bāghīshan Gach) is a village in Mazul Rural District of the Central District in Nishapur County, Razavi Khorasan province, Iran.

== Demographics ==
=== Population ===
At the time of the 2006 National Census, the village's population was 3,712 in 986 households. The following census in 2011 counted 4,216 people in 1,306 households. The 2016 census measured the population of the village as 3,915 people in 1,338 households, the most populous in its rural district.
