= Qaleh Now-e Jamshid =

Village in Razavi Khorasan province, Iran

Qaleh Now-e Jamshid Persian: قلعه نوجمشيد
- Village
- Location within Iran
- Coordinates: 36°14′29″N 58°46′31″E
- Country: Iran
- Province: Razavi Khorasan
- County: Nishapur
- District: Central
- Rural District: Mazul

Population (2016)
  - Total: 1,840
- Time zone: UTC+3:30 (IRST)

Qaleh Now-e Jamshid (Persian: قلعه نوجمشيد) (Note: Also romanized as Qal‘eh Now-e Jamshīd; also known as Qal‘eh Now and Qal‘eh Now-e Khāleşeh) is a village in Mazul Rural District of the Central District in Nishapur County, Razavi Khorasan province, Iran.

== Demographics ==
=== Population ===
At the time of the 2006 National Census, the village's population was 1,346 in 319 households. The following census in 2011 counted 1,617 people in 463 households. The 2016 census measured the population of the village as 1,840 people in 532 households.
