= Ruhabad, Darbqazi =

Village in Razavi Khorasan province, Iran

Ruhabad Persian: روح اباد
- Village
- Location within Iran
- Coordinates: 36°04′00″N 58°51′23″E
- Country: Iran
- Province: Razavi Khorasan
- County: Nishapur
- District: Central
- Rural District: Darbqazi

Population (2016)
  - Total: 374
- Time zone: UTC+3:30 (IRST)

Ruhabad (Persian: روح اباد) (Note: Also romanized as Rūḩābād) is a village in Darbqazi Rural District of the Central District in Nishapur County, Razavi Khorasan province, Iran.

== Demographics ==
=== Population ===
At the time of the 2006 National Census, the village's population was 506 in 150 households. The following census in 2011 counted 451 people in 150 households. The 2016 census measured the population of the village as 374 people in 129 households.
