= Vandish =

Village in Isfahan province, Iran

Vandish Persian: ونديش
- Village
- Location within Iran
- Coordinates: 32°54′15″N 52°40′55″E
- Country: Iran
- Province: Isfahan
- County: Nain
- District: Central
- Rural District: Baharestan

Population (2016)
  - Total: 85
- Time zone: UTC+3:30 (IRST)

Vandish (Persian: ونديش) (Note: Also romanized as Vandīsh) is a village in Baharestan Rural District of the Central District in Nain County, Isfahan province, Iran.

== Demographics ==
=== Population ===
At the time of the 2006 National Census, the village's population was 121 in 41 households. The following census in 2011 counted 78 people in 36 households. The 2016 census measured the population of the village as 85 people in 45 households.
