= Mehradaran =

Village in Isfahan province, Iran

Mehradaran Persian: مهرادران
- Village
- Location within Iran
- Coordinates: 32°55′38″N 52°43′04″E
- Country: Iran
- Province: Isfahan
- County: Nain
- District: Central
- Rural District: Baharestan

Population (2016)
  - Total: 129
- Time zone: UTC+3:30 (IRST)

Mehradaran (Persian: مهرادران) (Note: Also romanized as Mehrādarān and Mehrāderān; also known as Mehr Āvarān and Mehrdarān) is a village in Baharestan Rural District of the Central District in Nain County, Isfahan province, Iran.

== Demographics ==
=== Population ===
At the time of the 2006 National Census, the village's population was 120 in 47 households. The following census in 2011 counted 145 people in 59 households. The 2016 census measured the population of the village as 129 people in 57 households.
