= Great Dome of Mehrabad =

Historical building made during the Ilkhanate period of Persian

Coordinates: 36°09′56″N 58°45′38″E

- گنبد آجری مهرآباد
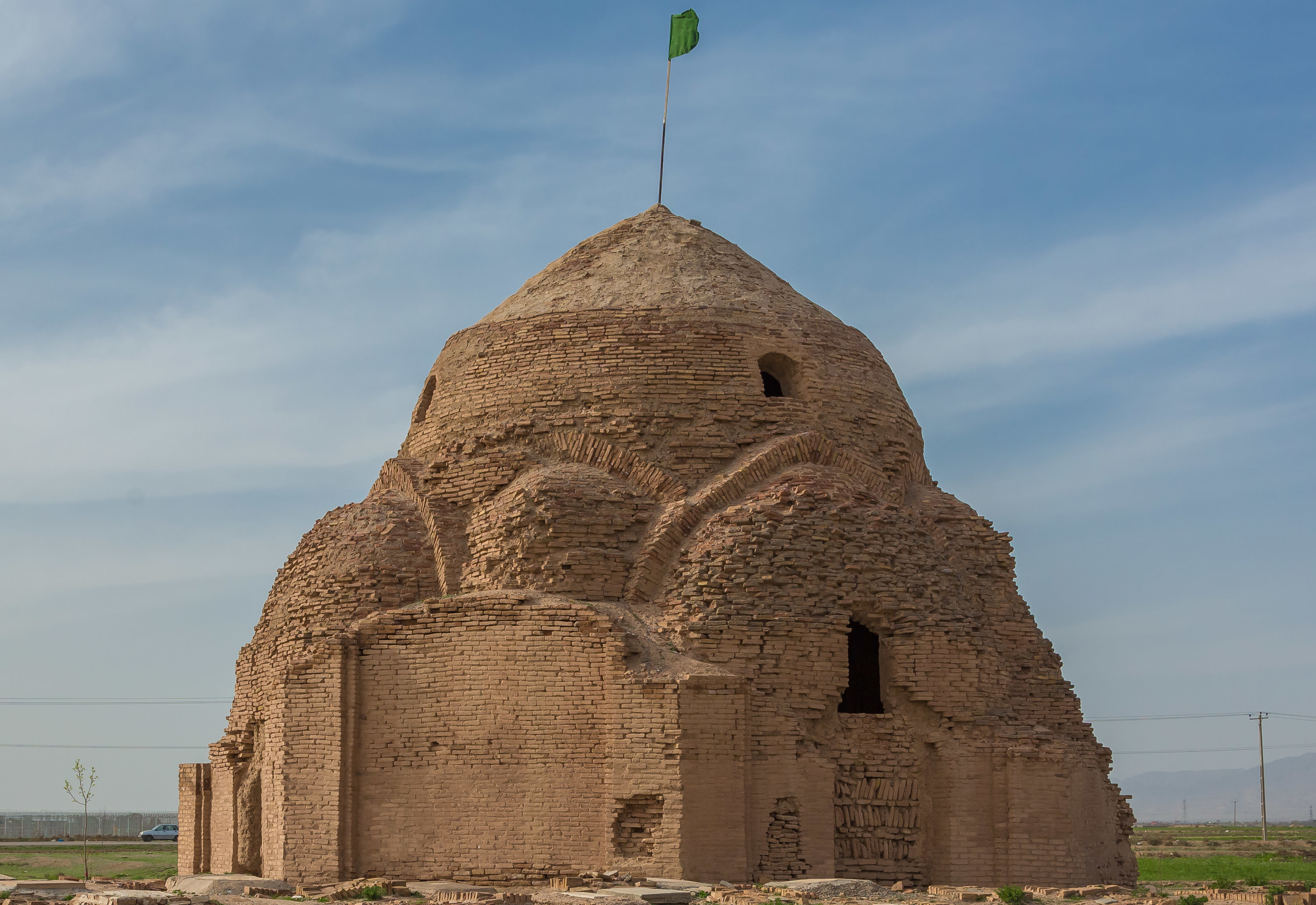
- Interactive map of Great Dome of Mehrabad

General information
- Location: Shad Mehrak, Nishapur
- Owner: Ministry of Cultural Heritage, Handicrafts and Tourism
- Affiliation: Ilkhanate

Height
- Roof: Dome

Technical details
- Material: Brick

Other information
- Facilities: Cemetery
- Parking: Available

The Great Dome of Mehrabad, Brick-made Dome of Shad Mehrak or Brick-made Dome of Mehr Abad (Persian:گنبد آجری مهرآباد) is a historical building built during the Ilkhanid period of Persia. This building is located in Shad Mehrak, a village located in the south of the city of Nishapur in Razavi Khorasan Province of Iran. This building has been registered on Iran's national heritage list with the registration number of 1549. A similar building with a dome is situated next to it.

== Gallery ==
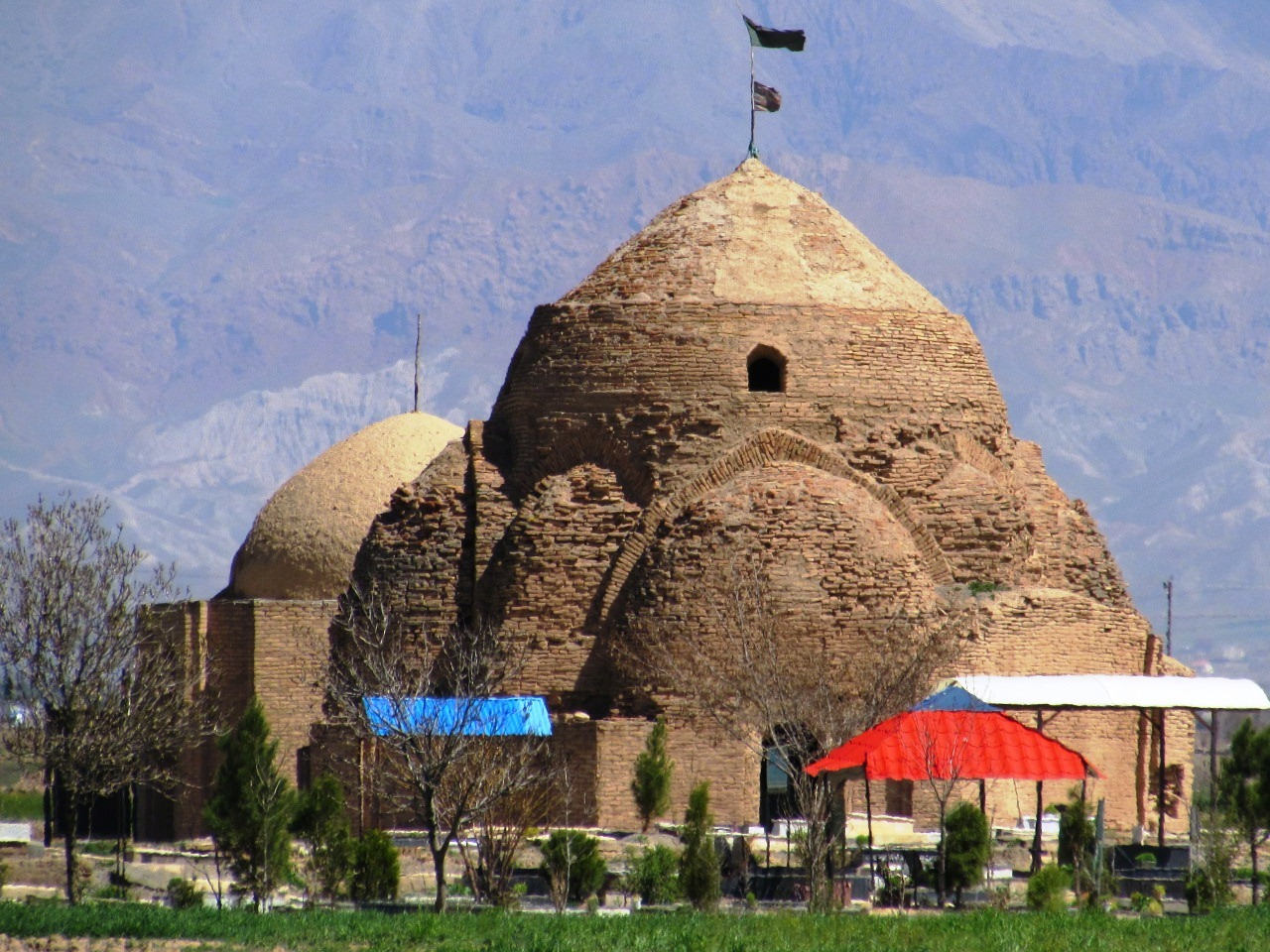

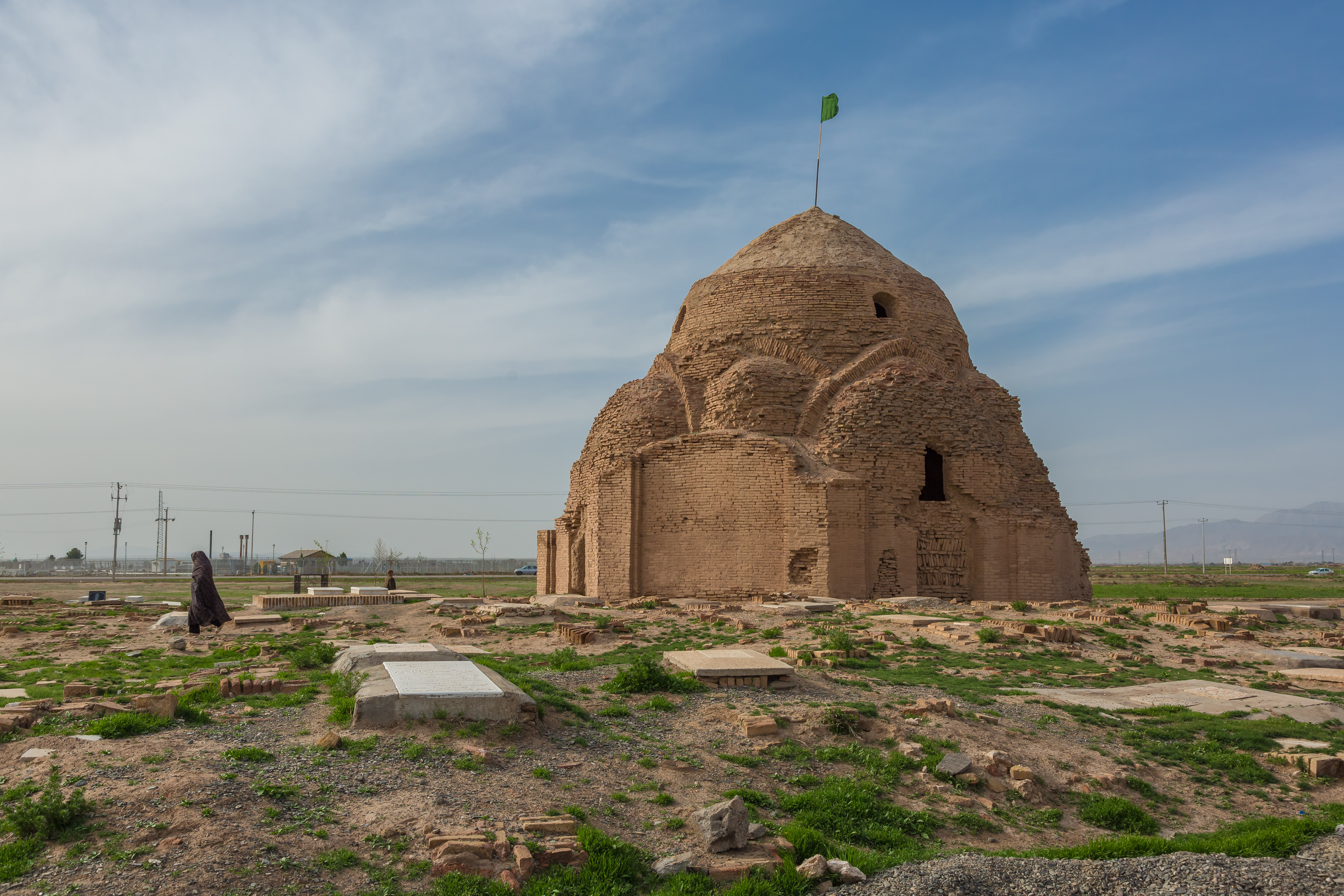

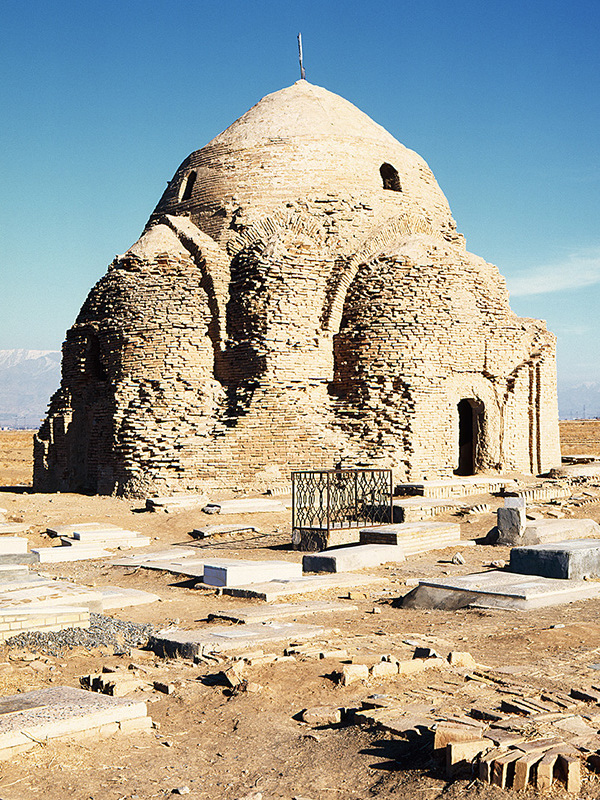
