= Baharestan Rural District =

Rural district in Isfahan province, Iran

Baharestan Rural District Persian: دهستان بهارستان
- Rural District
- Location within Iran
- Coordinates: 32°58′N 52°48′E
- Country: Iran
- Province: Isfahan
- County: Nain
- District: Central
- Established: 1987
- Capital: Kejan

Population (2016)
  - Total: 1,302
- Time zone: UTC+3:30 (IRST)

Baharestan Rural District (Persian: دهستان بهارستان) is in the Central District of Nain County, Isfahan province, Iran. Its capital is the village of Kejan.

== Demographics ==
=== Population ===
At the time of the 2006 National Census, the rural district's population was 1,603 in 572 households. There were 1,444 inhabitants in 567 households at the following census of 2011. The 2016 census measured the population of the rural district as 1,302 in 566 households. The most populous of its 43 villages was Kejan, with 357 people.

=== Other villages in the rural district ===
- Feyzabad-e Hajj Kazem
- Jeznabad
- Kharvan
- Mehradaran
- Neyestanak
- Vandish
