= Feyzabad, Kurdistan =

Feyzabad فيض آباد
- Village
- Location within Iran
- Coordinates: 36°24′40″N 46°46′54″E
- Country: Iran
- Province: Kurdistan
- County: Saqqez
- Bakhsh: Ziviyeh
- Rural District: Gol Tappeh

Population (2006)
  - Total: 176
- Time zone: UTC+3:30 (IRST)
  - Summer (DST): UTC+4:30 (IRDT)

Feyzabad (Persian: فيض آباد, also Romanized as Feyẕābād) is a village in Gol Tappeh Rural District, Ziviyeh District, Saqqez County, Kurdistan Province, Iran. At the 2006 census, its population was 176, in 38 families. The village is populated by Kurds.
