= Feyzabad, Nain =

Feyzabad فيض اباد
- Village
- Location within Iran
- Coordinates: 32°50′02″N 52°57′58″E
- Country: Iran
- Province: Isfahan
- County: Nain
- Bakhsh: Central
- Rural District: Lay Siyah

Population (2006)
  - Total: 14
- Time zone: UTC+3:30 (IRST)
  - Summer (DST): UTC+4:30 (IRDT)

Feyzabad (Persian: فيض اباد, also Romanized as Feyẕābād, Faizābād, and Feiz Abad) is a village in Lay Siyah Rural District, in the Central District of Nain County, Isfahan Province, Iran. At the 2006 census, its population was 14, in 7 families.
