= Feyzabad, Shiraz =

Feyzabad فيض اباد
- Village
- Location within Iran
- Coordinates: 29°38′42″N 52°58′05″E
- Country: Iran
- Province: Fars
- County: Shiraz
- Bakhsh: Zarqan
- Rural District: Rahmatabad

Population (2006)
  - Total: 124
- Time zone: UTC+3:30 (IRST)
  - Summer (DST): UTC+4:30 (IRDT)

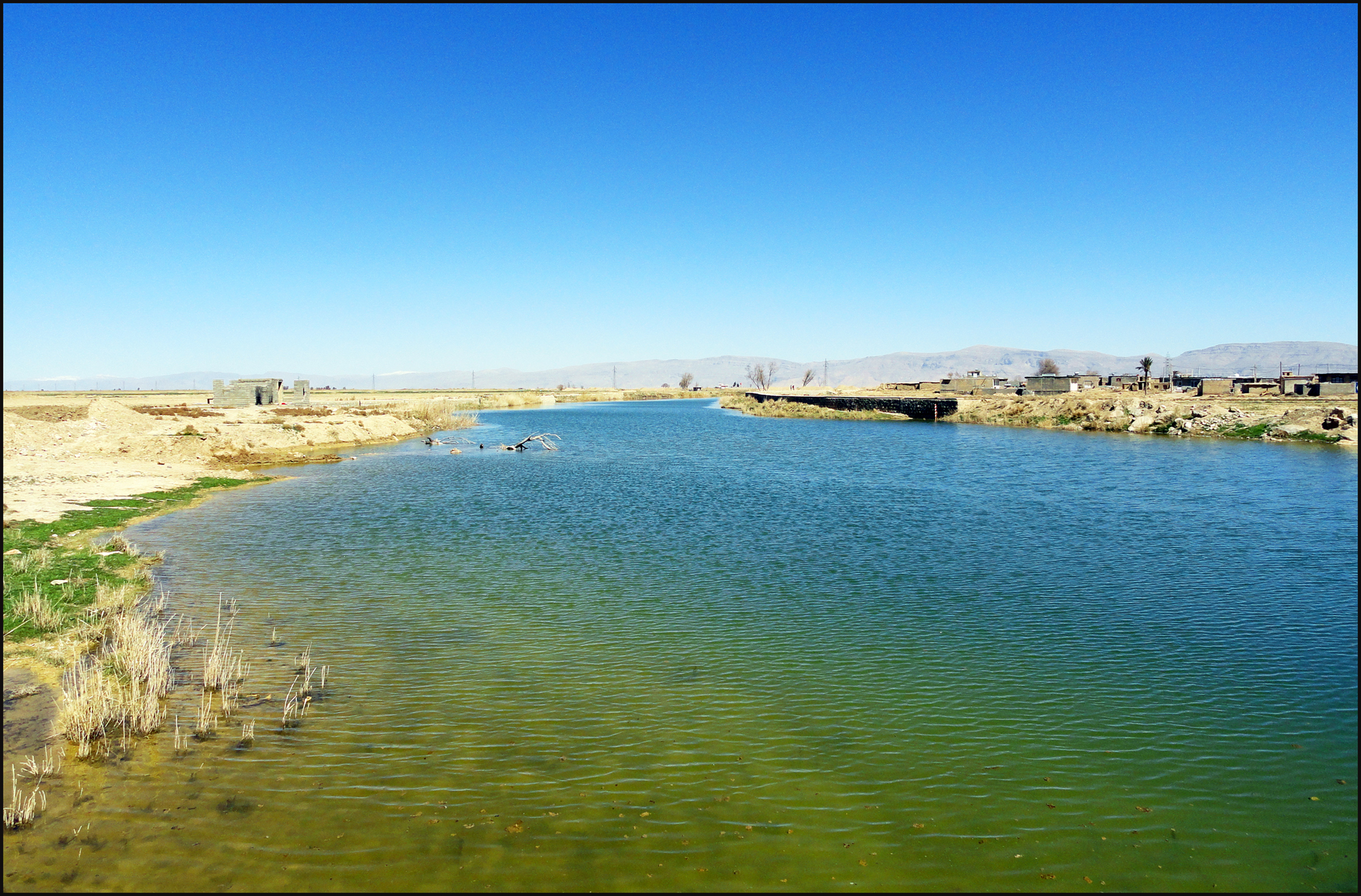

Feyzabad (Persian: فيض اباد, also Romanized as Feyẕābād and Faiz Abad) is a village in Rahmatabad Rural District, Zarqan District, Shiraz County, Fars province, Iran. At the 2006 census, its population was 124, in 31 families.
