= Feyzabad, Eqlid =

Feyzabad فيض اباد
- Village
- Country: Iran
- Province: Fars
- County: Eqlid
- Bakhsh: Central
- Rural District: Khosrow Shirin

Population (2006)
  - Total: 195
- Time zone: UTC+3:30 (IRST)
  - Summer (DST): UTC+4:30 (IRDT)

Feyzabad (Persian: فيض اباد, also Romanized as Feyẕābād) is a village in Khosrow Shirin Rural District, in the Central District of Eqlid County, Fars province, Iran. At the 2006 census, its population was 195, in 43 families.
