= Jeznabad, Lay Siyah =

Jeznabad جزن اباد
- Village
- Location within Iran
- Coordinates: 32°42′59″N 52°52′49″E
- Country: Iran
- Province: Isfahan
- County: Nain
- Bakhsh: Central
- Rural District: Lay Siyah

Population (2006)
  - Total: 8
- Time zone: UTC+3:30 (IRST)
  - Summer (DST): UTC+4:30 (IRDT)

Jeznabad (Persian: جزن اباد, also Romanized as Jeznābād and Jazanābād) is a village in Lay Siyah Rural District, in the Central District of Nain County, Isfahan Province, Iran. At the 2006 census, its population was 8, in 5 families.
