= Hajjiabad, Andika =

Hajjiabad حاجي اباد
- Village
- Location within Iran
- Coordinates: 32°14′07″N 49°29′50″E
- Country: Iran
- Province: Khuzestan
- County: Andika
- Bakhsh: Abezhdan
- Rural District: Abezhdan

Population (2006)
  - Total: 35
- Time zone: UTC+3:30 (IRST)
  - Summer (DST): UTC+4:30 (IRDT)

Hajjiabad (Persian: حاجي اباد, also Romanized as Ḩājjīābād and Hajīābād; also known as Feyẕābād) is a village in Abezhdan Rural District, Abezhdan District, Andika County, Khuzestan province, Iran. At the 2006 census, its population was 35, in 4 families.
