= Feyzabad, Chenaran =

Feyzabad فيض اباد
- Village
- Location within Iran
- Coordinates: 36°41′06″N 59°07′08″E
- Country: Iran
- Province: Razavi Khorasan
- County: Chenaran
- Bakhsh: Central
- Rural District: Chenaran

Population (2006)
  - Total: 90
- Time zone: UTC+3:30 (IRST)
  - Summer (DST): UTC+4:30 (IRDT)

Feyzabad (Persian: فيض اباد, also Romanized as Feyẕābād, Faizābād, and Feyzābād) is a village in Chenaran Rural District, in the Central District of Chenaran County, Razavi Khorasan Province, Iran. At the 2006 census, its population was 90, in 20 families.
