= Feyzabad, Chaypareh =

Feyzabad فيض اباد
- Village
- Location within Iran
- Coordinates: 38°48′47″N 44°58′33″E
- Country: Iran
- Province: West Azerbaijan
- County: Chaypareh
- Bakhsh: Central
- Rural District: Churs

Population (2006)
  - Total: 106
- Time zone: UTC+3:30 (IRST)
  - Summer (DST): UTC+4:30 (IRDT)

Feyzabad (Persian: فيض اباد, also Romanized as Feyẕābād) is a village in Churs Rural District, in the Central District of Chaypareh County, West Azerbaijan Province, Iran. As of the 2006 census, its population was 106, in 30 families.
