= Feyzabad, Darab =

Feyzabad فيض اباد
- Village
- Location within Iran
- Coordinates: 28°40′54″N 54°18′29″E
- Country: Iran
- Province: Fars
- County: Darab
- Bakhsh: Central
- Rural District: Nasrovan

Population (2006)
  - Total: 277
- Time zone: UTC+3:30 (IRST)
  - Summer (DST): UTC+4:30 (IRDT)

Feyzabad (Persian: فيض اباد, also Romanized as Feyẕābād, Faizābād, and Feiz Abad) is a village in Nasrovan Rural District, in the Central District of Darab County, Fars province, Iran. At the 2006 census, its population was 277, in 58 families.
