= Feyzabad, Shahdad =

Feyzabad فيض اباد
- Village
- Location within Iran
- Coordinates: 30°22′27″N 57°32′35″E
- Country: Iran
- Province: Kerman
- County: Kerman
- Bakhsh: Shahdad
- Rural District: Sirch

Population (2006)
  - Total: 453
- Time zone: UTC+3:30 (IRST)
  - Summer (DST): UTC+4:30 (IRDT)

Feyzabad (Persian: فيض اباد, also Romanized as Feyẕābād, Feyzābād, and Faizābād) is a village in Sirch Rural District, Shahdad District, Kerman County, Kerman Province, Iran. At the 2006 census, its population was 453, in 113 families.
