= Qeysabad =

Qeysabad قيس اباد
- Village
- Location within Iran
- Coordinates: 32°32′54″N 59°02′13″E
- Country: Iran
- Province: South Khorasan
- County: Khusf
- Bakhsh: Jolgeh-e Mazhan
- Rural District: Jolgeh-e Mazhan

Population (2006)
  - Total: 56
- Time zone: UTC+3:30 (IRST)
  - Summer (DST): UTC+4:30 (IRDT)

Qeysabad (Persian: قيس اباد, also Romanized as Qeyşābād, Qaisābād, and Gheis Abad; also known as Feyẕābād) is a village in Jolgeh-e Mazhan Rural District, Jolgeh-e Mazhan District, Khusf County, South Khorasan Province, Iran. At the 2006 census, its population was 56, in 15 families.
