= Ruhabad, Roshtkhar =

Ruhabad روح اباد
- Village
- Location within Iran
- Coordinates: 34°59′59″N 59°32′37″E
- Country: Iran
- Province: Razavi Khorasan
- County: Roshtkhar
- Bakhsh: Central
- Rural District: Roshtkhar

Population (2006)
  - Total: 400
- Time zone: UTC+3:30 (IRST)
  - Summer (DST): UTC+4:30 (IRDT)

Ruhabad (Persian: روح اباد, also Romanized as Rūḥābād; also known as Rūd Khar and Rād Khar) is a small village in Roshtkhar Rural District, Central District, Roshtkhar County, Razavi Khorasan Province, Iran. As of the 2006 census, it has a population of 400, in 99 families.
