= Feyzabad-e Hajj Kazem =

Village in Isfahan province, Iran

Feyzabad-e Hajj Kazem Persian: فيض ابادحاج كاظم
- Village
- Location within Iran
- Coordinates: 32°54′13″N 52°42′59″E
- Country: Iran
- Province: Isfahan
- County: Nain
- District: Central
- Rural District: Baharestan

Population (2016)
  - Total: 84
- Time zone: UTC+3:30 (IRST)

Feyzabad-e Hajj Kazem (Persian: فيض ابادحاج كاظم) (Note: Also romanized as Feyẕābād-e Ḩājj Kāz̧em; also known as Feyzābād and Feyzābād Ḩājjī Kāz̧em) is a village in Baharestan Rural District of the Central District in Nain County, Isfahan province, Iran.

== Demographics ==
=== Population ===
At the time of the 2006 National Census, the village's population was 158 in 53 households. The following census in 2011 counted 105 people in 43 households. The 2016 census measured the population of the village as 84 people in 40 households.
