= Darbqazi Rural District =

Rural district in Razavi Khorasan province, Iran

Darbqazi Rural District Persian: دهستان دربقاضي
- Rural District
- Location within Iran
- Coordinates: 36°02′N 58°52′E
- Country: Iran
- Province: Razavi Khorasan
- County: Nishapur
- District: Central
- Established: 1987
- Capital: Khujan

Population (2016)
  - Total: 9,528
- Time zone: UTC+3:30 (IRST)

Darbqazi Rural District (Persian: دهستان دربقاضي) is in the Central District of Nishapur County, Razavi Khorasan province, Iran. Its capital is the village of Khujan.

== Demographics ==
=== Population ===
At the time of the 2006 National Census, the rural district's population was 10,411 in 2,721 households. There were 9,854 inhabitants in 3,007 households at the following census of 2011. The 2016 census measured the population of the rural district as 9,528 in 3,161 households. The most populous of its 131 villages was Nowruzabad, with 960 people.

=== Other villages in the rural district ===
- Bagh-e Jafarabad
- Bahrudi
- Eslamabad-e Arab
- Jilu
- Karizak-e Kenar Kal
- Kariz-e Sabah
- Ruhabad
