= Firuzabad, Kerman =

Firuzabad فيروزاباد
- Village
- Location within Iran
- Coordinates: 29°35′09″N 57°32′07″E
- Country: Iran
- Province: Kerman
- County: Kerman
- Bakhsh: Rayen
- Rural District: Rayen

Population (2006)
  - Total: 13
- Time zone: UTC+3:30 (IRST)
  - Summer (DST): UTC+4:30 (IRDT)

Firuzabad (Persian: فيروزاباد, also Romanized as Fīrūzābād; also known as Feiz Abad and Feyẕābād) is a village in Rayen Rural District, Rayen District, Kerman County, Kerman Province, Iran. At the 2006 census, its population was 13, in 5 families.
