= Feyzabad, Hormozgan =

Feyzabad فيض اباد
- Village
- Location within Iran
- Coordinates: 27°12′27″N 57°20′17″E
- Country: Iran
- Province: Hormozgan
- County: Rudan
- Bakhsh: Jaghin
- Rural District: Jaghin-e Shomali

Population (2006)
  - Total: 269
- Time zone: UTC+3:30 (IRST)
  - Summer (DST): UTC+4:30 (IRDT)

Feyzabad (Persian: فيض اباد, also Romanized as Feyẕābād) is a village in Jaghin-e Shomali Rural District, Jaghin District, Rudan County, Hormozgan Province, Iran. At the 2006 census, its population was 269, in 52 families.
