= Jeznabad, Baharestan =

Village in Isfahan province, Iran

Jeznabad Persian: جزن اباد
- Village
- Location within Iran
- Coordinates: 32°54′26″N 52°41′33″E
- Country: Iran
- Province: Isfahan
- County: Nain
- District: Central
- Rural District: Baharestan

Population (2016)
  - Total: 121
- Time zone: UTC+3:30 (IRST)

Jeznabad (Persian: جزن اباد) (Note: Also romanized as Jazanābād and Jeznābād; also known as Gaiznābād) is a village in Baharestan Rural District of the Central District in Nain County, Isfahan province, Iran.

== Demographics ==
=== Population ===
At the time of the 2006 National Census, the village's population was 86 in 35 households. The following census in 2011 counted 227 people in 78 households. The 2016 census measured the population of the village as 121 people in 49 households.
