= Fazl Rural District (Nishapur County) =

Rural district in Razavi Khorasan province, Iran

Fazl Rural District Persian: دهستان فضل
- Rural District
- Location within Iran
- Coordinates: 36°14′N 58°56′E
- Country: Iran
- Province: Razavi Khorasan
- County: Nishapur
- District: Central
- Established: 1987
- Capital: Abu Sadi

Population (2016)
  - Total: 15,792
- Time zone: UTC+3:30 (IRST)

Fazl Rural District (Persian: دهستان فضل) is in the Central District of Nishapur County, Razavi Khorasan province, Iran. Its capital is the village of Abu Sadi.

== Demographics ==
=== Population ===
At the time of the 2006 National Census, the rural district's population was 15,323 in 4,400 households. There were 17,121 inhabitants in 5,122 households at the following census of 2011. The 2016 census measured the population of the rural district as 15,792 in 5,106 households. The most populous of its 71 villages was Farkhak, with 1,469 people.

=== Other villages in the rural district ===
- Boshrabad
- Buzhabad
- Buzhan
- Deh Sheykh
- Fushenjan
- Hamidabad
- Hoseynabad-e Jadid
- Yahyaabad
