= Mazul Rural District =

Rural district in Razavi Khorasan province, Iran

Mazul Rural District Persian: دهستان مازول
- Rural District
- Location within Iran
- Coordinates: 36°22′N 58°47′E
- Country: Iran
- Province: Razavi Khorasan
- County: Nishapur
- District: Central
- Established: 1987
- Capital: Qatnabad

Population (2016)
  - Total: 33,791
- Time zone: UTC+3:30 (IRST)

Mazul Rural District (Persian: دهستان مازول) is in the Central District of Nishapur County, Razavi Khorasan province, Iran. Its capital is the village of Qatnabad.

== Demographics ==
=== Population ===
At the time of the 2006 National Census, the rural district's population was 30,375 in 7,872 households. There were 34,718 inhabitants in 10,229 households at the following census of 2011. The 2016 census measured the population of the rural district as 33,791 in 10,554 households. The most populous of its 104 villages was Baghshan-e Gach, with 3,915 people.

=== Other villages in the rural district ===
- Deh-e Hallaj
- Deh Now-e Khaleseh
- Feyzabad (eastern)
- Feyzabad (western)
- Mirabad
- Qaleh Now-e Jamshid
- Sar Ab-e Kushk
- Shadab
- Shahrak
- Zarandeh
