= Rivand Rural District =

Rural district in Razavi Khorasan province, Iran

Rivand Rural District Persian: دهستان ريوند
- Rural District
- Location within Iran
- Coordinates: 36°09′N 58°42′E
- Country: Iran
- Province: Razavi Khorasan
- County: Nishapur
- District: Central
- Established: 1987
- Capital: Shad Mehrak

Population (2016)
  - Total: 8,296
- Time zone: UTC+3:30 (IRST)

Rivand Rural District (Persian: دهستان ريوند) is in the Central District of Nishapur County, Razavi Khorasan province, Iran. Its capital is the village of Shad Mehrak.

== Demographics ==
=== Population ===
At the time of the 2006 National Census, the rural district's population was 12,619 in 3,301 households. There were 8,835 inhabitants in 2,602 households at the following census of 2011. The 2016 census measured the population of the rural district as 8,296 in 2,489 households. The most populous of its 85 villages was Mobarakeh, with 1,335 people.

=== Other villages in the rural district ===
- Ahangaran
- Deh Now
- Deh-e Darugheh
- Golshan
- Hakimabad
- Helali
- Lotfabad
- Mohitabad
- Mozaffarabad

== See also ==
- Deh Now-e Kharabeh and Rahmatabad, former villages in the rural district and now neighborhoods in the city of Nishapur
