= Central District (Nishapur County) =

District in Razavi Khorasan province, Iran

Central District (Nishapur County) Persian: بخش مرکزی شهرستان نیشابور
- District
- Location within Iran
- Coordinates: 36°18′N 58°42′E
- Country: Iran
- Province: Razavi Khorasan
- County: Nishapur
- Capital: Nishapur

Population (2016)
  - Total: 341,182
- Time zone: UTC+3:30 (IRST)

The Central District of Nishapur County (Persian: بخش مرکزی شهرستان نیشابور) is in Razavi Khorasan province, Iran. Its capital is the city of Nishapur.

== History ==
In 2007, Binalud Rural District was transferred from Takht-e Jolgeh District to the Central District, and the village of Bar was converted to a city.

== Demographics ==
=== Population ===
At the time of the 2006 National Census, the district's population was 274,700 in 74,946 households. The following census in 2011 counted 319,576 people in 95,109 households. The 2016 census measured the population of the district as 341,182 inhabitants in 107,345 households.

=== Administrative divisions ===
Central District (Nishapur County) Population
Administrative Divisions	2006	2011	2016
Binalud RD (Note: Transferred from Takht-e Jolgeh District)		5,742	5,635
Darbqazi RD	10,411	9,854	9,528
Fazl RD	15,323	17,121	15,792
Mazul RD	30,375	34,718	33,791
Rivand RD	12,619	8,835	8,296
Bar (city)		4,121	3,765
Nishapur (city)	205,972	239,185	264,375
Total	274,700	319,576	341,182
RD = Rural District
