= Galib =

Galib is a given name and a surname. Notable people with the name include:

- Galib ibn Abd al-Rahman (c. 900 – 981), military commander in the ʿUmayyad caliphate of Córdoba
- Asadulla Al Galib (born 1998), Bangladeshi cricketer
- Eudaldo Báez Galib, Puerto Rican politician and former senator
- Gurcharan Singh Galib, Indian politician
- Haider Galib (1958–1983), Yemeni plastic artist from Akaba, Taiz Governorate
- İsmail Galib, numismatist in the Ottoman Empire
- Galib Israfilov (born 1975), Azerbaijani diplomat
- Galib Jafarov, Kazakh boxer of Azerbaijani descent
- Galib Mammadov, Azerbaijani-Norwegian composer
- Ali Galib Pasha (1800–1858), Ottoman statesman and diplomat

== See also ==
- Galib Kalan, village in Jagraon in Ludhiana district of Punjab State, India
- Galib Ran Singh, village in Jagraon in Ludhiana district of Punjab State, India
- Galeb (disambiguation)
- Ghalib
- Qalibaf (disambiguation)
