= Madan-e Olya =

Village in Razavi Khorasan province, Iran

Madan-e Olya Persian: معدن عليا
- Village
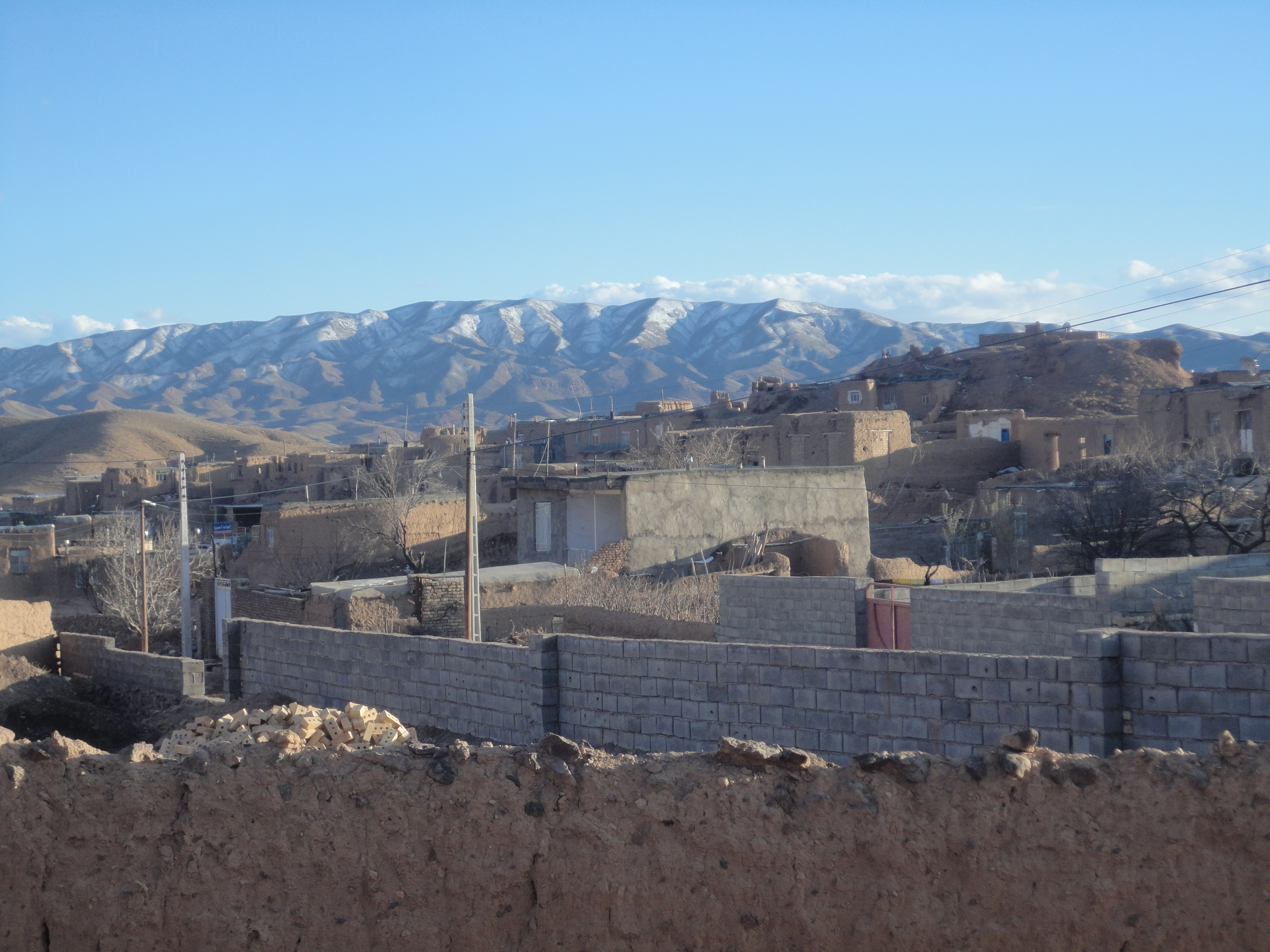
- The village of Madan-e Olya

- Location within Iran
- Coordinates: 36°28′30″N 58°24′36″E
- Country: Iran
- Province: Razavi Khorasan
- County: Firuzeh
- District: Central
- Rural District: Firuzeh

Population (2016)
  - Total: 579
- Time zone: UTC+3:30 (IRST)

Madan-e Olya (Persian: معدن عليا) (Note: Also romanized as Ma‘dan-e ‘Olyā; also known as Bār Ma‘dan ‘Olyā, Bār-e Ma‘dan-e Bālā, Ma‘dan, Ma‘dan-e Bālā, and Maidān) is a village in Firuzeh Rural District of the Central District in Firuzeh County, (Note: Formerly Takht-e Jolgeh County) Razavi Khorasan province, Iran.

== Demographics ==
=== Population ===
At the time of the 2006 National Census, the village's population was 557 in 164 households, when it was in the former Takht-e Jolgeh District of Nishapur County. The following census in 2011 counted 543 people in 166 households, by which time the district had been separated from the county in the establishment of Takht-e Jolgeh County. (Note: Renamed Firuzeh County) The rural district was transferred to the new Central District. The 2016 census measured the population of the village as 579 people in 182 households, the most populous in its rural district.

The historic Nishapur turquoise has been mined from the Rivand mountain near this village. An ancient city called Rivand of Nishapur has also been probably situated around the region of this village. Some Iranologists, believe that Rivand Mountain has been home to Adur Burzen-Mihr (a holy Zoroastrian fire temple).
