= Bozquchan =

Village in Razavi Khorasan province, Iran

Bozquchan Persian: بزقوچان
- Village
- Location within Iran
- Coordinates: 36°17′38″N 58°34′06″E
- Country: Iran
- Province: Razavi Khorasan
- County: Firuzeh
- District: Central
- Rural District: Takht-e Jolgeh

Population (2016)
  - Total: 1,053
- Time zone: UTC+3:30 (IRST)

Bozquchan (Persian: بزقوچان) (Note: Also romanized as Bozqūchān; also known as Bozqūjān) is a village in, and the capital of, Takht-e Jolgeh Rural District in the Central District of Firuzeh County, (Note: Formerly Takht-e Jolgeh County) Razavi Khorasan province, Iran. The rural district was previously administered from the city of Firuzeh. (Note: Formerly the village of Bozghan)

== Demographics ==
=== Population ===
At the time of the 2006 National Census, the village's population was 1,056 in 269 households, when it was in the former Takht-e Jolgeh District of Nishapur County. The following census in 2011 counted 1,037 people in 310 households, by which time the district had been separated from the county in the establishment of Takht-e Jolgeh County. (Note: Renamed Firuzeh County) The rural district was transferred to the new Central District. The 2016 census measured the population of the village as 1,053 people in 344 households.
