= Naveshk =

Naveshk ناوشك
- Village
- Location within Iran
- Coordinates: 36°17′44″N 58°19′50″E
- Country: Iran
- Province: Razavi Khorasan
- County: Firuzeh
- Bakhsh: Taghenkoh
- Rural District: Taghenkoh-e Shomali

Population (2006)
  - Total: 281
- Time zone: UTC+3:30 (IRST)
  - Summer (DST): UTC+4:30 (IRDT)

Naveshk (Persian: ناوشك, also Romanized as Nāveshk) is a village in Taghenkoh-e Shomali Rural District, Taghenkoh District, Firuzeh County, Razavi Khorasan Province, Iran. At the 2006 census, its population was 281, in 75 families.
