= Rahn Kariz =

Rahn Kariz رهن كاريز
- Village
- Location within Iran
- Coordinates: 36°05′47″N 58°30′33″E
- Country: Iran
- Province: Razavi Khorasan
- County: Firuzeh
- Bakhsh: Central
- Rural District: Takht-e Jolgeh

Population (2006)
  - Total: 387
- Time zone: UTC+3:30 (IRST)
  - Summer (DST): UTC+4:30 (IRDT)

Rahn Kariz (Persian: رهن كاريز, also Romanized as Rahn Kārīz; also known as Han Kārīz) is a village in Takht-e Jolgeh Rural District, in the Central District of Firuzeh County, Razavi Khorasan Province, Iran. At the 2006 census, its population was 387, in 92 families.
