= Golshanabad, Firuzeh =

Village in Razavi Khorasan province, Iran

Golshanabad Persian: گلشن اباد
- Village
- Location within Iran
- Coordinates: 36°21′41″N 58°37′15″E
- Country: Iran
- Province: Razavi Khorasan
- County: Firuzeh
- District: Central
- Rural District: Firuzeh

Population (2016)
  - Total: 321
- Time zone: UTC+3:30 (IRST)

Golshanabad (Persian: گلشن اباد) (Note: Also romanized as Golshanābād) is a village in Firuzeh Rural District of the Central District in Firuzeh County, (Note: Formerly Takht-e Jolgeh County) Razavi Khorasan province, Iran.

== Demographics ==
=== Population ===
At the time of the 2006 National Census, the village's population was 461 in 126 households, when it was in the former Takht-e Jolgeh District of Nishapur County. The following census in 2011 counted 414 people in 121 households, by which time the district had been separated from the county in the establishment of Takht-e Jolgeh County. (Note: Renamed Firuzeh County) The rural district was transferred to the new Central District. The 2016 census measured the population of the village as 321 people in 101 households.
