= Somman =

Somman صمان
- Village
- Location within Iran
- Coordinates: 36°20′07″N 58°18′59″E
- Country: Iran
- Province: Razavi Khorasan
- County: Firuzeh
- Bakhsh: Taghenkoh
- Rural District: Taghenkoh-e Shomali

Population (2006)
  - Total: 288
- Time zone: UTC+3:30 (IRST)
  - Summer (DST): UTC+4:30 (IRDT)

Somman (Persian: صمان, also Romanized as Şommān, Şamān, and Somān) is a village in Taghenkoh-e Shomali Rural District, Taghenkoh District, Firuzeh County, Razavi Khorasan Province, Iran. At the 2006 census, its population was 288, in 80 families.
