= Najafabad, Firuzeh =

Village in Razavi Khorasan province, Iran

Najafabad Persian: نجف اباد
- Village
- Location within Iran
- Coordinates: 36°11′54″N 58°32′04″E
- Country: Iran
- Province: Razavi Khorasan
- County: Firuzeh
- District: Central
- Rural District: Takht-e Jolgeh

Population (2016)
  - Total: 581
- Time zone: UTC+3:30 (IRST)

Najafabad (Persian: نجف اباد) (Note: Also romanized as Najafābād) is a village in Takht-e Jolgeh Rural District of the Central District in Firuzeh County, (Note: Formerly Takht-e Jolgeh County) Razavi Khorasan province, Iran.

== Demographics ==
=== Population ===
At the time of the 2006 National Census, the village's population was 539 in 126 households, when it was in the former Takht-e Jolgeh District of Nishapur County. The following census in 2011 counted 602 people in 170 households, by which time the district had been separated from the county in the establishment of Takht-e Jolgeh County. (Note: Renamed Firuzeh County) The rural district was transferred to the new Central District. The 2016 census measured the population of the village as 581 people in 172 households.
