= Chaq Qarah =

Village in Razavi Khorasan province, Iran

Chaq Qarah Persian: چاق قره
- Village
- Location within Iran
- Coordinates: 36°26′24″N 58°34′41″E
- Country: Iran
- Province: Razavi Khorasan
- County: Firuzeh
- District: Central
- Rural District: Firuzeh

Population (2016)
  - Total: 29
- Time zone: UTC+3:30 (IRST)

Chaq Qarah (Persian: چاق قره) (Note: Also romanized as Chāq Qarah; also known as Chāhqarah) is a village in Firuzeh Rural District of the Central District in Firuzeh County, (Note: Formerly Takht-e Jolgeh County) Razavi Khorasan province, Iran.

== Demographics ==
=== Population ===
At the time of the 2006 National Census, the village's population was 99 in 23 households, when it was in the former Takht-e Jolgeh District of Nishapur County. The following census in 2011 counted 44 people in 14 households, by which time the district had been separated from the county in the establishment of Takht-e Jolgeh County. (Note: Renamed Firuzeh County) The rural district was transferred to the new Central District. The 2016 census measured the population of the village as 29 people in eight households.
