= Robati Gharbatha =

Village in Razavi Khorasan province, Iran

Robati Gharbatha Persian: رباطي غربتها
- Village
- Location within Iran
- Coordinates: 36°25′30″N 58°26′32″E
- Country: Iran
- Province: Razavi Khorasan
- County: Firuzeh
- District: Central
- Rural District: Firuzeh

Population (2016)
  - Total: Below reporting threshold
- Time zone: UTC+3:30 (IRST)

Robati Gharbatha (Persian: رباطي غربتها) (Note: Also romanized as Robāţī Gharbathā; also known as Ribāti, Robāţ-e Sar Pāshīdeh, Robāţī, Robāţī Shāhzādeh, Robāţī-ye Balūchhā, Robāţī-ye Sāzdeh, Robāţī-ye Shāhzādeh, and Robāţī-ye Shāzdeh) is a village in Firuzeh Rural District of the Central District in Firuzeh County, (Note: Formerly Takht-e Jolgeh County) Razavi Khorasan province, Iran.

== Demographics ==
=== Population ===
At the time of the 2006 National Census, the village's population was 22 in five households, when it was in the former Takht-e Jolgeh District of Nishapur County. The following census in 2011 counted 20 people in nine households, by which time the district had been separated from the county in the establishment of Takht-e Jolgeh County. (Note: Renamed Firuzeh County) The rural district was transferred to the new Central District. The 2016 census measured the population of the village as below the reporting threshold.
