= Derakht-e Jowz =

Derakht-e Jowz درختجوز
- Village
- Location within Iran
- Coordinates: 36°26′16″N 58°44′29″E
- Country: Iran
- Province: Razavi Khorasan
- County: Firuzeh
- Bakhsh: Central
- Rural District: Firuzeh

Population (2006)
  - Total: 130
- Time zone: UTC+3:30 (IRST)
  - Summer (DST): UTC+4:30 (IRDT)

Derakht-e Jowz (Persian: درختجوز, also Romanized as Derakht Jowz) is a village in Firuzeh Rural District, in the Central District of Firuzeh County, Razavi Khorasan Province, Iran. At the 2006 census, its population was 130, in 34 families.
