= Kalateh-ye Zamanabad =

Kalateh-ye Zamanabad كلاته زمان اباد
- Village
- Location within Iran
- Coordinates: 36°08′42″N 58°31′58″E
- Country: Iran
- Province: Razavi Khorasan
- County: Firuzeh
- Bakhsh: Central
- Rural District: Takht-e Jolgeh

Population (2006)
  - Total: 75
- Time zone: UTC+3:30 (IRST)
  - Summer (DST): UTC+4:30 (IRDT)

Kalateh-ye Zamanabad (Persian: كلاته زمان اباد, also Romanized as Kalāteh-ye Zamānābād) is a village in Takht-e Jolgeh Rural District, in the Central District of Firuzeh County, Razavi Khorasan Province, Iran. At the 2006 census, its population was 75, in 18 families.
