= Bazuband =

Bazuband بازوبند
- Village
- Location within Iran
- Coordinates: 36°13′29″N 58°31′05″E
- Country: Iran
- Province: Razavi Khorasan
- County: Firuzeh
- Bakhsh: Central
- Rural District: Takht-e Jolgeh

Population (2006)
  - Total: 584
- Time zone: UTC+3:30 (IRST)
  - Summer (DST): UTC+4:30 (IRDT)

Bazuband (Persian: بازوبند, also Romanized as Bāzūband and Bāzū Band) is a village in Takht-e Jolgeh Rural District, in the Central District of Firuzeh County, Razavi Khorasan Province, Iran. At the 2006 census, its population was 584, in 132 families.

== See also ==
- List of cities, towns and villages in Razavi Khorasan Province
