= Motamadiyeh =

Village in Razavi Khorasan province, Iran

Motamadiyeh Persian: معتمديه
- Village
- Location within Iran
- Coordinates: 36°13′46″N 58°33′33″E
- Country: Iran
- Province: Razavi Khorasan
- County: Firuzeh
- District: Central
- Rural District: Takht-e Jolgeh

Population (2016)
  - Total: 548
- Time zone: UTC+3:30 (IRST)

Motamadiyeh (Persian: معتمديه) (Note: Also romanized as Mo‘tamadīyeh) is a village in Takht-e Jolgeh Rural District of the Central District in Firuzeh County, (Note: Formerly Takht-e Jolgeh County) Razavi Khorasan province, Iran.

== Demographics ==
=== Population ===
At the time of the 2006 National Census, the village's population was 611 in 148 households, when it was in the former Takht-e Jolgeh District of Nishapur County. The following census in 2011 counted 603 people in 169 households, by which time the district had been separated from the county in the establishment of Takht-e Jolgeh County. (Note: Renamed Firuzeh County) The rural district was transferred to the new Central District. The 2016 census measured the population of the village as 548 people in 166 households.
