= Vaziriyeh =

Village in Razavi Khorasan province, Iran

Vaziriyeh Persian: وزيريه
- Village
- Location within Iran
- Coordinates: 36°23′42″N 58°32′39″E
- Country: Iran
- Province: Razavi Khorasan
- County: Firuzeh
- District: Central
- Rural District: Firuzeh

Population (2016)
  - Total: 134
- Time zone: UTC+3:30 (IRST)

Vaziriyeh (Persian: وزيريه) (Note: Also romanized as Vazīrīyeh) is a village in Firuzeh Rural District of the Central District in Firuzeh County, (Note: Formerly Takht-e Jolgeh County) Razavi Khorasan province, Iran.

== Demographics ==
=== Population ===
At the time of the 2006 National Census, the village's population was 158 in 37 households, when it was in the former Takht-e Jolgeh District of Nishapur County. The following census in 2011 counted 141 people in 41 households, by which time the district had been separated from the county in the establishment of Takht-e Jolgeh County. (Note: Renamed Firuzeh County) The rural district was transferred to the new Central District. The 2016 census measured the population of the village as 134 people in 46 households.
