= Tappeh-ye Jik =

Tappeh-ye Jik تپه جيك
- Village
- Location within Iran
- Coordinates: 36°21′28″N 58°14′57″E
- Country: Iran
- Province: Razavi Khorasan
- County: Firuzeh
- Bakhsh: Taghenkoh
- Rural District: Taghenkoh-e Shomali

Population (2006)
  - Total: 275
- Time zone: UTC+3:30 (IRST)
  - Summer (DST): UTC+4:30 (IRDT)

Tappeh-ye Jik (Persian: تپه جيك, also Romanized as Tappeh-ye Jīk and Tappeh Jīk) is a village in Taghenkoh-e Shomali Rural District, Taghenkoh District, Firuzeh County, Razavi Khorasan Province, Iran. At the 2006 census, its population was 275, in 59 families.
