= Yengeh Qaleh, Razavi Khorasan =

Village in Razavi Khorasan province, Iran

Yengeh Qaleh Persian: ينگه قلعه
- Village
- Location within Iran
- Coordinates: 36°17′30″N 58°37′28″E
- Country: Iran
- Province: Razavi Khorasan
- County: Firuzeh
- District: Central
- Rural District: Takht-e Jolgeh

Population (2016)
  - Total: 571
- Time zone: UTC+3:30 (IRST)

Yengeh Qaleh (Persian: ينگه قلعه) (Note: Also romanized as Yengeh Qal‘eh) is a village in Takht-e Jolgeh Rural District of the Central District in Firuzeh County, (Note: Formerly Takht-e Jolgeh County) Razavi Khorasan province, Iran.

== Demographics ==
=== Population ===
At the time of the 2006 National Census, the village's population was 623 in 141 households, when it was in the former Takht-e Jolgeh District of Nishapur County. The following census in 2011 counted 608 people in 170 households, by which time the district had been separated from the county in the establishment of Takht-e Jolgeh County. (Note: Renamed Firuzeh County) The rural district was transferred to the new Central District. The 2016 census measured the population of the village as 571 people in 174 households.
