= Malakh Darreh-ye Sofla =

Village in Razavi Khorasan province, Iran

Malakh Darreh-ye Sofla Persian: ملخدره سفلي
- Village
- Location within Iran
- Coordinates: 36°21′37″N 58°38′43″E
- Country: Iran
- Province: Razavi Khorasan
- County: Firuzeh
- District: Central
- Rural District: Firuzeh

Population (2016)
  - Total: 123
- Time zone: UTC+3:30 (IRST)

Malakh Darreh-ye Sofla (Persian: ملخدره سفلي) (Note: Also romanized as Malakh Darreh-ye Soflá; also known as Malakh Darreh) is a village in Firuzeh Rural District of the Central District in Firuzeh County, (Note: Formerly Takht-e Jolgeh County) Razavi Khorasan province, Iran.

== Demographics ==
=== Population ===
At the time of the 2006 National Census, the village's population was 171 in 52 households, when it was in the former Takht-e Jolgeh District of Nishapur County. The following census in 2011 counted 139 people in 45 households, by which time the district had been separated from the county in the establishment of Takht-e Jolgeh County. (Note: Renamed Firuzeh County) The rural district was transferred to the new Central District. The 2016 census measured the population of the village as 123 people in 38 households.
