= Madan-e Sofla =

Village in Razavi Khorasan province, Iran

Madan-e Sofla Persian: معدن سفلي
- Village
- Location within Iran
- Coordinates: 36°28′59″N 58°24′21″E
- Country: Iran
- Province: Razavi Khorasan
- County: Firuzeh
- District: Central
- Rural District: Firuzeh

Population (2016)
  - Total: 531
- Time zone: UTC+3:30 (IRST)

Madan-e Sofla (Persian: معدن سفلي) (Note: Also romanized as Ma‘dan-e Soflá; also known as Bār Ma‘dan Soflá and Ma‘dan-e Pā’īn) is a village in Firuzeh Rural District of the Central District in Firuzeh County, (Note: Formerly Takht-e Jolgeh County) Razavi Khorasan province, Iran.

== Demographics ==
=== Population ===
At the time of the 2006 National Census, the village's population was 516 in 152 households, when it was in the former Takht-e Jolgeh District of Nishapur County. The following census in 2011 counted 484 people in 164 households, by which time the district had been separated from the county in the establishment of Takht-e Jolgeh County. (Note: Renamed Firuzeh County) The rural district was transferred to the new Central District. The 2016 census measured the population of the village as 531 people in 180 households.
