= Kalateh-ye Shuri =

Kalateh-ye Shuri كلاته شوري
- Village
- Country: Iran
- Province: Razavi Khorasan
- County: Firuzeh
- Bakhsh: Central
- Rural District: Takht-e Jolgeh

Population (2006)
  - Total: 111
- Time zone: UTC+3:30 (IRST)
  - Summer (DST): UTC+4:30 (IRDT)

Kalateh-ye Shuri (Persian: كلاته شوري, also Romanized as Kalāteh-ye Shūrī) is a village in Takht-e Jolgeh Rural District, in the Central District of Firuzeh County, Razavi Khorasan Province, Iran. At the 2006 census, its population was 111, in 32 families.
