= Sar Deh, Razavi Khorasan =

Village in Razavi Khorasan province, Iran

Sar Deh Persian: سرده
- Village
- Location within Iran
- Coordinates: 36°09′48″N 58°32′08″E
- Country: Iran
- Province: Razavi Khorasan
- County: Firuzeh
- District: Central
- Rural District: Takht-e Jolgeh

Population (2016)
  - Total: 614
- Time zone: UTC+3:30 (IRST)

Sar Deh (Persian: سرده) is a village in Takht-e Jolgeh Rural District of the Central District in Firuzeh County, (Note: Formerly Takht-e Jolgeh County) Razavi Khorasan province, Iran.

== Demographics ==
=== Population ===
At the time of the 2006 National Census, the village's population was 671 in 177 households, when it was in the former Takht-e Jolgeh District of Nishapur County. The following census in 2011 counted 637 people in 186 households, by which time the district had been separated from the county in the establishment of Takht-e Jolgeh County. (Note: Renamed Firuzeh County) The rural district was transferred to the new Central District. The 2016 census measured the population of the village as 614 people in 193 households.
