= Aryeh =

Aryeh اريه
- Village
- Location within Iran
- Coordinates: 36°27′28″N 58°42′31″E
- Country: Iran
- Province: Razavi Khorasan
- County: Firuzeh
- Bakhsh: Central
- Rural District: Firuzeh

Population (2006)
  - Total: 221
- Time zone: UTC+3:30 (IRST)
  - Summer (DST): UTC+4:30 (IRDT)

Aryeh (Persian: اريه) is a village in Firuzeh Rural District, in the Central District of Firuzeh County, Razavi Khorasan Province, Iran. At the 2006 census, its population was 221, in 54 families.

== See also ==
- List of cities, towns and villages in Razavi Khorasan Province
