= Tuzandeh Jan-e Now =

Tuzandeh Jan-e Now توزنده جان نو
- Village
- Location within Iran
- Coordinates: 36°15′14″N 58°30′14.7″E
- Country: Iran
- Province: Razavi Khorasan
- County: Firuzeh
- Bakhsh: Taghenkoh
- Rural District: Taghenkoh-e Shomali

Population (2006)
  - Total: 147
- Time zone: UTC+3:30 (IRST)
  - Summer (DST): UTC+4:30 (IRDT)

Tuzandeh Jan-e Now (Persian: توزنده جان نو, also Romanized as Tūzandeh Jān-e Now) is a village in Taghenkoh-e Shomali Rural District, Taghenkoh District, Firuzeh County, Razavi Khorasan Province, Iran. At the 2006 census, its population was 147, in 42 families. The village lies just north of the similarly named settlement of Tuzandeh Jan-e Kohneh.
