= Miantu =

Miantu ميان تو
- Village
- Location within Iran
- Coordinates: 36°23′55″N 58°18′10″E
- Country: Iran
- Province: Razavi Khorasan
- County: Firuzeh
- Bakhsh: Taghenkoh
- Rural District: Taghenkoh-e Shomali

Population (2006)
  - Total: 39
- Time zone: UTC+3:30 (IRST)
  - Summer (DST): UTC+4:30 (IRDT)

Miantu (Persian: ميان تو, also Romanized as Mīāntū) is a village in Taghenkoh-e Shomali Rural District, Taghenkoh District, Firuzeh County, Razavi Khorasan Province, Iran. At the 2006 census, its population was 39, in 14 families.
