= Qalibaf-e Sofla =

Village in Razavi Khorasan province, Iran

Qalibaf-e Sofla Persian: قالي باف سفلي
- Village
- Location within Iran
- Coordinates: 36°22′38″N 58°35′57″E
- Country: Iran
- Province: Razavi Khorasan
- County: Firuzeh
- District: Central
- Rural District: Firuzeh

Population (2016)
  - Total: 169
- Time zone: UTC+3:30 (IRST)

Qalibaf-e Sofla (Persian: قالي باف سفلي) (Note: Also romanized as Qālībāf-e Soflá; also known as Qālībāf-e Pā’īn) is a village in, and the capital of, Firuzeh Rural District in the Central District of Firuzeh County, (Note: Formerly Takht-e Jolgeh County) Razavi Khorasan province, Iran.

== Demographics ==
=== Population ===
At the time of the 2006 National Census, the village's population was 204 in 48 households, when it was in the former Takht-e Jolgeh District of Nishapur County. The following census in 2011 counted 196 people in 55 households, by which time the district had been separated from the county in the establishment of Takht-e Jolgeh County. (Note: Renamed Firuzeh County) The rural district was transferred to the new Central District. The 2016 census measured the population of the village as 169 people in 58 households.
