= Batu, Iran =

Village in Razavi Khorasan province, Iran

Batu Persian: بتو
- Village
- Location within Iran
- Coordinates: 36°24′00″N 58°20′40″E
- Country: Iran
- Province: Razavi Khorasan
- County: Firuzeh
- District: Taghenkuh
- Rural District: Taghenkuh-e Shomali

Population (2016)
  - Total: 585
- Time zone: UTC+3:30 (IRST)

Batu (Persian: بتو) (Note: Also romanized as Batū and Betū; also known as Batau) is a village in Taghenkuh-e Shomali Rural District (Note: Formerly Taghenkuh Rural District) of Taghenkuh District in Firuzeh County, (Note: Formerly Takht-e Jolgeh County) Razavi Khorasan province, Iran.

== Demographics ==
=== Population ===
At the time of the 2006 National Census, the village's population was 908 in 221 households, when it was in Nishapur County. The following census in 2011 counted 802 people in 222 households, by which time the district had been separated from the county in the establishment of Takht-e Jolgeh County. (Note: Renamed Firuzeh County) The 2016 census measured the population of the village as 585 people in 179 households.
