= Kafki, Razavi Khorasan =

Village in Razavi Khorasan province, Iran

Kafki Persian: كفكي
- Village
- Location within Iran
- Coordinates: 36°06′52″N 58°31′22″E
- Country: Iran
- Province: Razavi Khorasan
- County: Firuzeh
- District: Central
- Rural District: Takht-e Jolgeh

Population (2016)
  - Total: 889
- Time zone: UTC+3:30 (IRST)

Kafki (Persian: كفكي) (Note: Also romanized as Kafkī; also known as Kafgi and Kafgīr) is a village in Takht-e Jolgeh Rural District of the Central District in Firuzeh County, (Note: Formerly Takht-e Jolgeh County) Razavi Khorasan province, Iran.

== Demographics ==
=== Population ===
At the time of the 2006 National Census, the village's population was 921 in 237 households, when it was in the former Takht-e Jolgeh District of Nishapur County. The following census in 2011 counted 924 people in 283 households, by which time the district had been separated from the county in the establishment of Takht-e Jolgeh County. (Note: Renamed Firuzeh County) The rural district was transferred to the new Central District. The 2016 census measured the population of the village as 889 people in 285 households.
