= Shuryab =

Village in Razavi Khorasan province, Iran

Shuryab Persian: شورياب
- Village
- Location within Iran
- Coordinates: 36°09′58″N 58°23′34″E
- Country: Iran
- Province: Razavi Khorasan
- County: Firuzeh
- District: Taghenkuh
- Rural District: Taghenkuh-e Jonubi

Population (2016)
  - Total: 264
- Time zone: UTC+3:30 (IRST)

Shuryab (Persian: شورياب) (Note: Also romanized as Shūryāb; also known as Shūrāb) is a village in Taghenkuh-e Jonubi Rural District of Taghenkuh District in Firuzeh County, (Note: Formerly Takht-e Jolgeh County) Razavi Khorasan province, Iran.

== Demographics ==
=== Population ===
At the time of the 2006 National Census, the village's population was 512 in 136 households, when it was in Nishapur County. The following census in 2011 counted 335 people in 114 households, by which time the district had been separated from the county in the establishment of Takht-e Jolgeh County. (Note: Renamed Firuzeh County) The 2016 census measured the population of the village as 264 people in 101 households.
