= Khanloq, Razavi Khorasan =

Khanloq خانلق
- Village
- Location within Iran
- Coordinates: 36°23′54″N 58°37′42″E
- Country: Iran
- Province: Razavi Khorasan
- County: Firuzeh
- Bakhsh: Central
- Rural District: Firuzeh

Population (2006)
  - Total: 566
- Time zone: UTC+3:30 (IRST)
  - Summer (DST): UTC+4:30 (IRDT)

Khanloq (Persian: خانلق, also Romanized as Khānloq) is a village in Firuzeh Rural District, in the Central District of Firuzeh County, Razavi Khorasan Province, Iran. At the 2006 census, its population was 566, in 143 families.
