= Karji, Iran =

Karji (Persian: كارجي) may refer to:

- Karji, Firuzeh
- Karji, Nishapur
