= Kafki =

Kafki (Persian: كفكي) may refer to:

- Kafki, Razavi Khorasan
- Kafki, South Khorasan
