= Eqbaliyeh (disambiguation) =

Eqbaliyeh is a city in Qazvin Province, Iran.

Eqbaliyeh (Persian: اقباليه) may also refer to:

- Eqbaliyeh, Alborz
- Eqbaliyeh, Razavi Khorasan
- Eqbaliyeh, Nishapur, Razavi Khorasan Province
