= Damjan =

Damjan may refer to:

== People ==
- Damjan (given name)
- Jernej Damjan (born 1983), Slovenian ski jumper

== Places ==
- Damjan-Fortuz, a village in Albania
- Damjan, a village in Kosovo
- Damjan, Iran
- Damjan, Radoviš, North Macedonia
