= Qarah Cheshmeh =

Qarah Cheshmeh or Qareh Cheshmeh (Persian: قره چشمه) may refer to:

- Qarah Cheshmeh, Golestan
- Qareh Cheshmeh, North Khorasan
- Qarah Cheshmeh, Razavi Khorasan
