= Eqbaliyeh, Razavi Khorasan =

Eqbaliyeh اقباليه
- Village
- Location within Iran
- Coordinates: 36°15′15″N 58°34′27″E
- Country: Iran
- Province: Razavi Khorasan
- County: Firuzeh
- Bakhsh: Central
- Rural District: Takht-e Jolgeh

Population (2006)
  - Total: 424
- Time zone: UTC+3:30 (IRST)
  - Summer (DST): UTC+4:30 (IRDT)

Eqbaliyeh (Persian: اقباليه, also Romanized as Eqbālīyeh) is a village in Takht-e Jolgeh Rural District, in the Central District of Firuzeh County, Razavi Khorasan Province, Iran. At the 2006 census, its population was 424, in 111 families.
