= Shurab, Firuzeh =

Village in Razavi Khorasan province, Iran

Shurab Persian: شوراب
- Village
- Location within Iran
- Coordinates: 36°20′45″N 58°15′47″E
- Country: Iran
- Province: Razavi Khorasan
- County: Firuzeh
- District: Taghenkuh
- Rural District: Taghenkuh-e Shomali

Population (2016)
  - Total: 986
- Time zone: UTC+3:30 (IRST)

Shurab (Persian: شوراب) (Note: Also romanized as Shūr Āb and Shūrāb) is a village in Taghenkuh-e Shomali Rural District (Note: Formerly Taghenkuh Rural District) of Taghenkuh District in Firuzeh County, (Note: Formerly Takht-e Jolgeh County) Razavi Khorasan province, Iran.

== Demographics ==
=== Population ===
At the time of the 2006 National Census, the village's population was 1,019 in 249 households, when it was in Nishapur County. The following census in 2011 counted 1,068 people in 299 households, by which time the district had been separated from the county in the establishment of Takht-e Jolgeh County. (Note: Renamed Firuzeh County) The 2016 census measured the population of the village as 986 people in 307 households.
