= Hemmatabad-e Zamani =

Village in Razavi Khorasan province, Iran

Hemmatabad-e Zamani Persian: همتاباد زماني
- Village
- Location within Iran
- Coordinates: 36°08′10″N 58°31′30″E
- Country: Iran
- Province: Razavi Khorasan
- County: Firuzeh
- District: Central
- Rural District: Takht-e Jolgeh

Population (2016)
  - Total: 1,568
- Time zone: UTC+3:30 (IRST)

Hemmatabad-e Zamani (Persian: همتابادزماني) (Note: Also romanized as Hemmatābād-e Zamānī; also known as Hemmatābād and Hemmatābād-e Zamānābād) is a village in Takht-e Jolgeh Rural District of the Central District in Firuzeh County, (Note: Formerly Takht-e Jolgeh County) Razavi Khorasan province, Iran.

== Demographics ==
=== Population ===
At the time of the 2006 National Census, the village's population was 1,447 in 390 households, when it was in the former Takht-e Jolgeh District of Nishapur County. The following census in 2011 counted 1,535 people in 466 households, by which time the district had been separated from the county in the establishment of Takht-e Jolgeh County. (Note: Renamed Firuzeh County) The rural district was transferred to the new Central District. The 2016 census measured the population of the village as 1,568 people in 501 households, the most populous in its rural district.
