= Soleymani, Firuzeh =

Village in Razavi Khorasan province, Iran

Soleymani Persian: سليماني
- Village
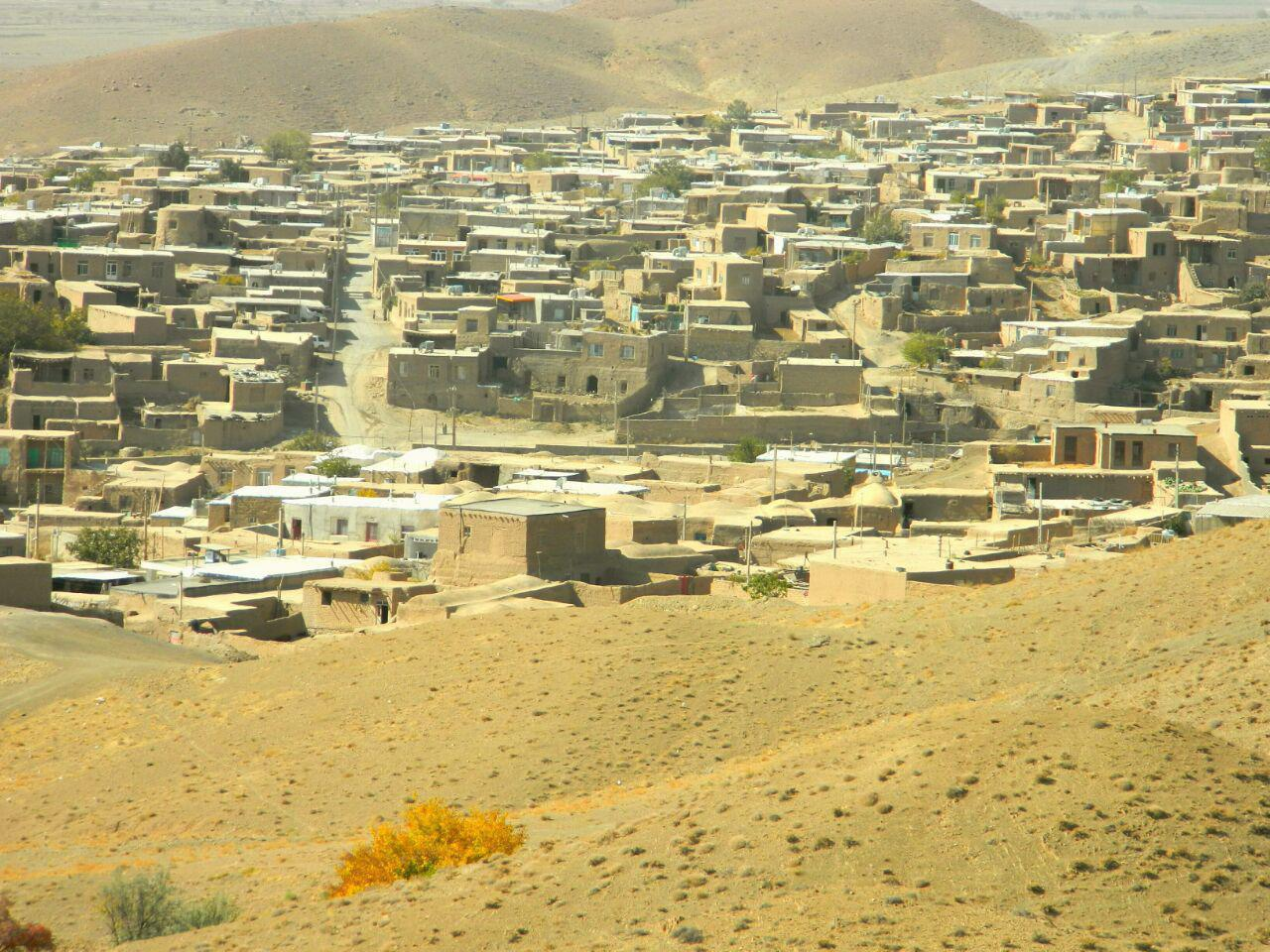
- The village of Soleymani

- Location within Iran
- Coordinates: 36°21′46″N 58°26′13″E
- Country: Iran
- Province: Razavi Khorasan
- County: Firuzeh
- District: Taghenkuh
- Rural District: Taghenkuh-e Shomali

Population (2016)
  - Total: 1,097
- Time zone: UTC+3:30 (IRST)

Soleymani (Persian: سليماني) (Note: Also romanized as Soleymānī; also known as Sulaimānī) is a village in Taghenkuh-e Shomali Rural District (Note: Formerly Taghenkuh Rural District) of Taghenkuh District in Firuzeh County, (Note: Formerly Takht-e Jolgeh County) Razavi Khorasan province, Iran.

== Demographics ==
=== Population ===
At the time of the 2006 National Census, the village's population was 1,386 in 422 households, when it was in Nishapur County. The following census in 2011 counted 1,272 people in 451 households, by which time the district had been separated from the county in the establishment of Takht-e Jolgeh County. (Note: Renamed Firuzeh County) The 2016 census measured the population of the village as 1,097 people in 410 households.
