= Shuri-ye Bozorg =

Village in Razavi Khorasan province, Iran

Shuri-ye Bozorg Persian: شوري بزرگ
- Village
- Location within Iran
- Coordinates: 36°17′22″N 58°38′46″E
- Country: Iran
- Province: Razavi Khorasan
- County: Firuzeh
- District: Central
- Rural District: Takht-e Jolgeh

Population (2016)
  - Total: 588
- Time zone: UTC+3:30 (IRST)

Shuri-ye Bozorg (Persian: شوري بزرگ) (Note: Also romanized as Shūrī Bozorg, Shūrī-ye Bozorg, and Shūrī-Yebozorg; also known as Shūrī) is a village in Takht-e Jolgeh Rural District of the Central District in Firuzeh County, (Note: Formerly Takht-e Jolgeh County) Razavi Khorasan province, Iran.

== Demographics ==
=== Population ===
At the time of the 2006 National Census, the village's population was 667 in 168 households, when it was in the former Takht-e Jolgeh District of Nishapur County. The following census in 2011 counted 650 people in 202 households, by which time the district had been separated from the county in the establishment of Takht-e Jolgeh County. (Note: Renamed Firuzeh County) The rural district was transferred to the new Central District. The 2016 census measured the population of the village as 588 people in 187 households.
