= Shuri =

Shuri may refer to:

== People ==
- Syuri (朱里, born 1989), ring name of Syuri Kondo, a Japanese professional wrestler, shoot boxer and kickboxer
- Shuri Koyama (小山 珠里, born 1999), Japanese footballer
- Shuri Okuda (奥田 朱理, born 1989), Japanese professional wrestler

== Characters ==
- Shuri (character), a Marvel Comics superhero
  - Shuri (Marvel Cinematic Universe), the Marvel Cinematic Universe adaptation

== Places ==
- Shuri, Bhutan, a town in Bumthang District
- Shuri, Iran, a village in Razavi Khorasan Province, Iran
- Shuri, Okinawa, Japan, former capital of the Ryūkyū Kingdom
  - Shuri Castle, Japan, former palace of the Ryūkyū Kingdom
  - Shuri Station, Naha, Okinawa Prefecture, Japan
- Shuri-ye Bozorg, a village in Takht-e Jolgeh Rural District, Iran

== See also ==
- Shuri-ryū, a style of karate
- Shuri-te, is a term for a type of indigenous martial art
