= Nayyerabad, Razavi Khorasan =

Nayyerabad نيراباد
- Village
- Location within Iran
- Coordinates: 36°15′15″N 58°29′43″E
- Country: Iran
- Province: Razavi Khorasan
- County: Firuzeh
- Bakhsh: Taghenkoh
- Rural District: Taghenkoh-e Shomali

Population (2006)
  - Total: 613
- Time zone: UTC+3:30 (IRST)
  - Summer (DST): UTC+4:30 (IRDT)

Nayyerabad (Persian: نيراباد, also Romanized as Nayyerābād) is a village in Taghenkoh-e Shomali Rural District, Taghenkoh District, Firuzeh County, Razavi Khorasan Province, Iran. At the 2006 census, its population was 613, in 167 families.
