= Shurvarz =

Village in Razavi Khorasan province, Iran

Shurvarz Persian: شورورز
- Village
- Location within Iran
- Coordinates: 36°12′44″N 58°19′20″E
- Country: Iran
- Province: Razavi Khorasan
- County: Firuzeh
- District: Taghenkuh
- Rural District: Taghenkuh-e Jonubi

Population (2016)
  - Total: 250
- Time zone: UTC+3:30 (IRST)

Shurvarz (Persian: شورورز) (Note: Also romanized as Shūrvarz; also known as Shūrvarar and Shūrvarzī) is a village in Taghenkuh-e Jonubi Rural District of Taghenkuh District in Firuzeh County, (Note: Formerly Takht-e Jolgeh County) Razavi Khorasan province, Iran.

== Demographics ==
=== Population ===
At the time of the 2006 National Census, the village's population was 350 in 90 households, when it was in Nishapur County. The following census in 2011 counted 284 people in 81 households, by which time the district had been separated from the county in the establishment of Takht-e Jolgeh County. (Note: Renamed Firuzeh County) The 2016 census measured the population of the village as 250 people in 81 households.
