= Tuzandeh Jan =

Tuzandeh Jan (Persian: توزنده جان) may refer to:

- Tuzandeh Jan-e Kohneh
- Tuzandeh Jan-e Now
