= Nayyerabad =

Nayyerabad or Nirabad (Persian: نيراباد) may refer to:

- Nayyerabad, Hamadan
- Nayyerabad, Isfahan
- Nayyerabad, Razavi Khorasan
