= Qalibaf-e Olya =

Village in Razavi Khorasan province, Iran

Qalibaf-e Olya Persian: قالي باف عليا
- Village
- Location within Iran
- Coordinates: 36°22′56″N 58°36′18″E
- Country: Iran
- Province: Razavi Khorasan
- County: Firuzeh
- District: Central
- Rural District: Firuzeh

Population (2016)
  - Total: 28
- Time zone: UTC+3:30 (IRST)

Qalibaf-e Olya (Persian: قالي باف عليا) (Note: Also romanized as Qālībāf-e ‘Olyā; also known as Qālībāf-e Bālā) is a village in Firuzeh Rural District of the Central District in Firuzeh County, (Note: Formerly Takht-e Jolgeh County) Razavi Khorasan province, Iran.

== Demographics ==
=== Population ===
At the time of the 2006 National Census, the village's population was 51 in 12 households, when it was in the former Takht-e Jolgeh District of Nishapur County. The following census in 2011 counted 43 people in 15 households, by which time the district had been separated from the county in the establishment of Takht-e Jolgeh County. (Note: Renamed Firuzeh County) The rural district was transferred to the new Central District. The 2016 census measured the population of the village as 28 people in 11 households.
