= Hemmatabad-e Zamanabad =

Hemmatabad-e Zamanabad may refer to:

- Hemmatabad
- Hemmatabad-e Zamani
