= Chahar Bagh =

Chahar Bagh (sometimes also spelled Chaharbagh or Charbagh) (Persian: چهارباغ) may refer to:

- Charbagh, a type of Persian garden

== India ==
- Charbagh, a locality in Lucknow, home to Charbagh railway station
  - Lucknow Charbagh railway station, Lucknow, India
  - Charbagh metro station

== Iran ==
=== Alborz province ===
- Chaharbagh County, an administrative division
  - Chaharbagh District, the former name of the Central District of Chaharbagh County
  - Chaharbagh, a city in Chaharbagh County

=== Golestan province ===
- Chahar Bagh, Golestan, a village in Gorgan County

=== Isfahan province ===
- Chaharbagh, Isfahan, an avenue in the city of Isfahan
  - Chahar Bagh School, a cultural complex on Chaharbagh Avenue in the city of Isfahan

=== North Khorasan province ===
- Chahar Bagh, North Khorasan, a village in Maneh County

=== Razavi Khorasan province ===
- Chahar Bagh, Razavi Khorasan, a village in Firuzeh County
- Chahar Bagh, Quchan, a village in Quchan County

=== Tehran province ===
- Chahar Bagh, Malard, a village in Malard County
- Chahar Bagh, Shemiranat, a village in Shemiranat County

== Pakistan ==
- Charbagh, Mansehra, a town in Khyber Pakhtunkhwa
- Charbagh, Swabi, a town in Khyber Pakhtunkhwa
- Charbagh, Swat, a village in Swat
