= Marzan, Iran =

Village in Razavi Khorasan province, Iran

Marzan Persian: مرزان
- Village
- Location within Iran
- Coordinates: 36°30′13″N 58°15′07″E
- Country: Iran
- Province: Razavi Khorasan
- County: Firuzeh
- District: Taghenkuh
- Rural District: Taghenkuh-e Shomali

Population (2016)
  - Total: 1,257
- Time zone: UTC+3:30 (IRST)

Marzan (Persian: مرزان) (Note: Also romanized as Marzān) is a village in Taghenkuh-e Shomali Rural District (Note: Formerly Taghenkuh Rural District) of Taghenkuh District in Firuzeh County, (Note: Formerly Takht-e Jolgeh County) Razavi Khorasan province, Iran.

== Demographics ==
=== Population ===
At the time of the 2006 National Census, the village's population was 1,413 in 295 households, when it was in Nishapur County. The following census in 2011 counted 1,380 people in 348 households, by which time the district had been separated from the county in the establishment of Takht-e Jolgeh County. (Note: Renamed Firuzeh County) The 2016 census measured the population of the village as 1,257 people in 357 households, the most populous in its rural district.
