= Qaleh Hasan, Firuzeh =

Village in Razavi Khorasan province, Iran

Qaleh Hasan Persian: قلعه حسن
- Village
- Location within Iran
- Coordinates: 36°26′07″N 58°21′51″E
- Country: Iran
- Province: Razavi Khorasan
- County: Firuzeh
- District: Central
- Rural District: Firuzeh

Population (2016)
  - Total: Below reporting threshold
- Time zone: UTC+3:30 (IRST)

Qaleh Hasan (Persian: قلعه حسن) (Note: Also romanized as Qal‘eh Ḩasan; also known as Kalāteh Ḩasan) is a village in Firuzeh Rural District of the Central District in Firuzeh County, (Note: Formerly Takht-e Jolgeh County) Razavi Khorasan province, Iran.

== Demographics ==
=== Population ===
At the time of the 2006 National Census, the village's population was 61 in 16 households, when it was in the former Takht-e Jolgeh District of Nishapur County. The following census in 2011 counted 17 people in six households, by which time the district had been separated from the county in the establishment of Takht-e Jolgeh County. (Note: Renamed Firuzeh County) The rural district was transferred to the new Central District. The 2016 census measured the population of the village as below the reporting threshold.
