= Qara Cheshmeh =

Qara Cheshmeh قاراچشمه
- Village
- Location within Iran
- Coordinates: 36°18′00″N 58°37′57″E
- Country: Iran
- Province: Razavi Khorasan
- County: Firuzeh
- Bakhsh: Central
- Rural District: Takht-e Jolgeh

Population (2006)
  - Total: 52
- Time zone: UTC+3:30 (IRST)
  - Summer (DST): UTC+4:30 (IRDT)

Qara Cheshmeh (Persian: قاراچشمه, also Romanized as Qārā Cheshmeh also known as Qarah Cheshmeh and Qareh Cheshmeh) is a village in Takht-e Jolgeh Rural District, in the Central District of Firuzeh County, Razavi Khorasan Province, Iran. At the 2006 census, its population was 52, in 13 families.
