= Qaleh Dozdan =

Village in Razavi Khorasan province, Iran

Qaleh Dozdan Persian: قلعه دزدان
- Village
- Location within Iran
- Coordinates: 36°17′46″N 58°18′09″E
- Country: Iran
- Province: Razavi Khorasan
- County: Firuzeh
- District: Taghenkuh
- Rural District: Taghenkuh-e Shomali

Population (2016)
  - Total: 953
- Time zone: UTC+3:30 (IRST)

Qaleh Dozdan (Persian: قلعه دزدان) (Note: Also romanized as Qal‘eh Dozdān; also known as Qal‘eh Yazdān (قلعه يزدان)) is a village in Taghenkuh-e Shomali Rural District (Note: Formerly Taghenkuh Rural District) of Taghenkuh District in Firuzeh County, (Note: Formerly Takht-e Jolgeh County) Razavi Khorasan province, Iran.

== Demographics ==
=== Population ===
At the time of the 2006 National Census, the village's population was 1,147 in 290 households, when it was in Nishapur County. The following census in 2011 counted 1,043 people in 297 households, by which time the district had been separated from the county in the establishment of Takht-e Jolgeh County. (Note: Renamed Firuzeh County) The 2016 census measured the population of the village as 953 people in 319 households.
