= Damanjan =

Damanjan دامن جان
- Village
- Location within Iran
- Coordinates: 36°26′44″N 58°39′15″E
- Country: Iran
- Province: Razavi Khorasan
- County: Firuzeh
- Bakhsh: Central
- Rural District: Firuzeh

Population (2006)
  - Total: 266
- Time zone: UTC+3:30 (IRST)
  - Summer (DST): UTC+4:30 (IRDT)

Damanjan (Persian: دامن جان, also Romanized as Dāmanjān and Dāmenjān; also known as Damanyan and Dāmjān) is a village in Firuzeh Rural District, in the Central District of Firuzeh County, Razavi Khorasan Province, Iran. At the 2006 census, its population was 266, in 63 families.
