= Qarah Bagh, Razavi Khorasan =

Village in Razavi Khorasan province, Iran

Qarah Bagh Persian: قره باغ
- Village
- Location within Iran
- Coordinates: 36°19′59″N 58°17′20″E
- Country: Iran
- Province: Razavi Khorasan
- County: Firuzeh
- District: Taghenkuh
- Rural District: Taghenkuh-e Shomali

Population (2016)
  - Total: 649
- Time zone: UTC+3:30 (IRST)

Qarah Bagh (Persian: قره باغ) (Note: Also romanized as Qarah Bāgh and Qareh Bāgh; also known as Qarābāq) is a village in Taghenkuh-e Shomali Rural District (Note: Formerly Taghenkuh Rural District) of Taghenkuh District in Firuzeh County, (Note: Formerly Takht-e Jolgeh County) Razavi Khorasan province, Iran.

== Demographics ==
=== Population ===
At the time of the 2006 National Census, the village's population was 747 in 205 households, when it was in Nishapur County. The following census in 2011 counted 733 people in 236 households, by which time the district had been separated from the county in the establishment of Takht-e Jolgeh County. (Note: Renamed Firuzeh County) The 2016 census measured the population of the village as 649 people in 215 households.
