= Shur Gesht =

Village in Razavi Khorasan province, Iran

Shur Gesht Persian: شورگشت
- Village
- Location within Iran
- Coordinates: 36°13′32″N 58°18′58″E
- Country: Iran
- Province: Razavi Khorasan
- County: Firuzeh
- District: Taghenkuh
- Rural District: Taghenkuh-e Jonubi

Population (2016)
  - Total: 867
- Time zone: UTC+3:30 (IRST)

Shur Gesht (Persian: شورگشت) (Note: Also romanized as Shūr Gesht; also known as Shūr Kesht) is a village in, and the capital of, Taghenkuh-e Jonubi Rural District in Taghenkuh District of Firuzeh County, (Note: Formerly Takht-e Jolgeh County) Razavi Khorasan province, Iran. The rural district was previously administered from the city of Garmab.

== Demographics ==
=== Population ===
At the time of the 2006 National Census, the village's population was 1,214 in 335 households, when it was in Nishapur County. The following census in 2011 counted 1,069 people in 359 households, by which time the district had been separated from the county in the establishment of Takht-e Jolgeh County. (Note: Renamed Firuzeh County) The 2016 census measured the population of the village as 867 people in 318 households.
