= Chahar Bagh, Razavi Khorasan =

Chahar Bagh چهارباغ
- Village
- Location within Iran
- Coordinates: 36°25′14″N 58°39′04″E
- Country: Iran
- Province: Razavi Khorasan
- County: Firuzeh
- Bakhsh: Central
- Rural District: Firuzeh

Population (2006)
  - Total: 226
- Time zone: UTC+3:30 (IRST)
  - Summer (DST): UTC+4:30 (IRDT)

Chahar Bagh (Persian: چهارباغ, also Romanized as Chahār Bāgh; also known as Chahanāgh) is a village in Firuzeh Rural District, in the Central District of Firuzeh County, Razavi Khorasan Province, Iran. At the 2006 census, its population was 226, in 56 families.
