= Kharaq, Iran =

Kharaq or Kharq (Persian: خرق) may refer to:

- Kharaq, North Khorasan
- Kharq, Razavi Khorasan
