= Zavang =

Zavang (Persian: زاونگ) may refer to:

- Zavang-e Olya
- Zavang-e Sofla
