= Zarvand =

Village in Razavi Khorasan province, Iran

Zarvand Persian: زروند
- Village
- Location within Iran
- Coordinates: 36°10′50″N 58°24′24″E
- Country: Iran
- Province: Razavi Khorasan
- County: Firuzeh
- District: Taghenkuh
- Rural District: Taghenkuh-e Jonubi

Population (2016)
  - Total: 86
- Time zone: UTC+3:30 (IRST)

Zarvand (Persian: زروند) (Note: Also romanized as Zarwand) is a village in Taghenkuh-e Jonubi Rural District of Taghenkuh District in Firuzeh County, (Note: Formerly Takht-e Jolgeh County) Razavi Khorasan province, Iran.

== Demographics ==
=== Population ===
At the time of the 2006 National Census, the village's population was 235 in 63 households, when it was in Nishapur County. The following census in 2011 counted 162 people in 58 households, by which time the district had been separated from the county in the establishment of Takht-e Jolgeh County. (Note: Renamed Firuzeh County) The 2016 census measured the population of the village as 86 people in 31 households.
