= Taqan =

Taqan طاقان
- Village
- Location within Iran
- Coordinates: 36°25′21″N 58°41′02″E
- Country: Iran
- Province: Razavi Khorasan
- County: Firuzeh
- Bakhsh: Central
- Rural District: Firuzeh

Population (2006)
  - Total: 166
- Time zone: UTC+3:30 (IRST)
  - Summer (DST): UTC+4:30 (IRDT)

Taqan (Persian: طاقان, also Romanized as Ţāqān and Ţāghān) is a village in Firuzeh Rural District, in the Central District of Firuzeh County, Razavi Khorasan Province, Iran. At the 2006 census, its population was 166, in 48 families.
