= Rangail =

- village
- Location in Uttar Pradesh, India Rangail (India)
- Coordinates: 29.5559°N 77.4023°E
- Country: India
- State: Uttar Pradesh
- District: Saharanpur

Government
  - Body: Gram panchayat

Population (2010)
  - Total: 1,535
  - Density: 324/km^{2} (840/sq mi)

Languages
  - Official: Hindi English Urdu Arabic
- Time zone: UTC+5:30 (IST)
- PIN: 247769
- Telephone code: 91-132
- ISO 3166 code: IN-HR
- Vehicle registration: up11
- Sex ratio: 991 ♂/♀
- Website: up.gov.in

Rangail is a village in the Saharanpur district in Uttar Pradesh, India. It is situated about 16 km away from Saharanpur proper at the Highway Deoband. The population includes many communities e.g. Tyagi, Kashyap, Pal, Vishvakarma, Harijan, Salmani, Telli, Jhojje And Shekh. In this village, the main occupation is farming and Government Service. There are many villages near Rangail. These are Sunehati kharkhari, Roopri, Feraheri, Kolkie, Pathed, Hariyabas, Itava, khajoori etc.
