= Karkhaneh-ye Qand, Razavi Khorasan =

Karkhaneh-ye Qand كارخانه قند
- Village
- Country: Iran
- Province: Razavi Khorasan
- County: Firuzeh
- Bakhsh: Central
- Rural District: Takht-e Jolgeh

Population (2006)
  - Total: 36
- Time zone: UTC+3:30 (IRST)
  - Summer (DST): UTC+4:30 (IRDT)

Karkhaneh-ye Qand (Persian: كارخانه قند, also Romanized as Kārkhāneh-ye Qand) is a village in Takht-e Jolgeh Rural District, in the Central District of Firuzeh County, Razavi Khorasan Province, Iran. At the 2006 census, its population was 36, in 7 families.
