= Nosk =

Nosk (Persian: نسك) may refer to:

- Nosk, Kerman
- Nosk, Razavi Khorasan
- Nosk, a boss in Hollow Knight
