= Qaleh Hasan =

Qaleh Hasan (Persian: قلعه حسن) may refer to:

- Qaleh Hasan, North Khorasan
- Qaleh Hasan, Firuzeh, Razavi Khorasan Province
- Qaleh Hasan, Sistan and Baluchestan
- Qaleh Hasan, Tehran
- Qaleh Hasan, West Azerbaijan
