= Chahar Gushli =

Village in Razavi Khorasan province, Iran

Chahar Gushli Persian: چهارگوشلي
- Village
- Location within Iran
- Coordinates: 36°37′55″N 58°27′41″E
- Country: Iran
- Province: Razavi Khorasan
- County: Nishapur
- District: Central
- Rural District: Binalud

Population (2016)
  - Total: 192
- Time zone: UTC+3:30 (IRST)

Chahar Gushli (Persian: چهارگوشلي) (Note: Also romanized as Chahār Gūshlī; also known as Chahār Gūsheh and Chehār Gūsheh) is a village in Binalud Rural District of the Central District in Nishapur County, Razavi Khorasan province, Iran.

== Demographics ==
=== Population ===
At the time of the 2006 National Census, the village's population was 251 in 63 households, when it was in the former Takht-e Jolgeh District. The following census in 2011 counted 205 people in 59 households, by which time the rural district had been transferred to the Central District. The 2016 census measured the population of the village as 192 people in 64 households.
