= Hesar Now =

Hesar Now (Persian: حصارنو) may refer to:

- Hesar Now, Firuzeh
- Hesar Now, Nishapur
