= Bojnu-ye Olya =

Village in Razavi Khorasan province, Iran

Bojnu-ye Olya Persian: بجنوعليا
- Village
- Location within Iran
- Coordinates: 36°31′55″N 58°40′21″E
- Country: Iran
- Province: Razavi Khorasan
- County: Nishapur
- District: Central
- Rural District: Binalud

Population (2016)
  - Total: 286
- Time zone: UTC+3:30 (IRST)

Bojnu-ye Olya (Persian: بجنوعليا) (Note: Also romanized as Bojnū-ye ‘Olyā; also known as Bojnū) is a village in Binalud Rural District of the Central District in Nishapur County, Razavi Khorasan province, Iran.

== Demographics ==
=== Population ===
At the time of the 2006 National Census, the village's population was 456 in 108 households, when it was in the former Takht-e Jolgeh District. The following census in 2011 counted 385 people in 116 households, by which time the rural district had been transferred to the Central District. The 2016 census measured the population of the village as 286 people in 99 households.
