= Khanloq =

Khanloq or Khanluq or Khanlog or Khan Laq (Persian: خانلق) may refer to:

- Khan Laq, North Khorasan
- Khanloq, Razavi Khorasan
- Khanloq, Tehran
