= Baqi, Nishapur =

Village in Razavi Khorasan province, Iran

Baqi Persian: بقیع
- Village
- Location within Iran
- Coordinates: 36°35′48″N 58°42′17″E
- Country: Iran
- Province: Razavi Khorasan
- County: Nishapur
- District: Central
- Rural District: Binalud

Population (2016)
  - Total: 321
- Time zone: UTC+3:30 (IRST)

Baqi (Persian: بقیع) (Note: Also romanized as Baqī‘; also known as Baqīj) is a village in Binalud Rural District of the Central District in Nishapur County, Razavi Khorasan province, Iran.

== Demographics ==
=== Population ===
At the time of the 2006 National Census, the village's population was 477 in 104 households, when it was in the former Takht-e Jolgeh District. The following census in 2011 counted 381 people in 105 households, by which time the rural district had been transferred to the Central District. The 2016 census measured the population of the village as 321 people in 91 households.
