= Fahneh =

Fahneh (Persian: فهنه) may refer to places in Iran:

- Fahneh, Firuzeh
- Fahneh, Nishapur
