= Qalibaf =

Qalibaf (Persian: قاليباف) may refer to:

== People ==
- Mohammad Bagher Ghalibaf (born 1961), Iranian politician

== Places in Iran ==
- Qalibaf, Markazi
- Qalibaf, Semnan
- Qalibaf-e Olya, Razavi Khorasan Province
- Qalibaf-e Sofla, Razavi Khorasan Province
