= Marusk =

Village in Razavi Khorasan province, Iran

Marusk Persian: ماروسك
- Village
- Location within Iran
- Coordinates: 36°31′36″N 58°32′59″E
- Country: Iran
- Province: Razavi Khorasan
- County: Nishapur
- District: Central
- Rural District: Binalud

Population (2016)
  - Total: 342
- Time zone: UTC+3:30 (IRST)

Marusk (Persian: ماروسك) (Note: Also romanized as Mārūsk; also known as Mārūsh) is a village in, and the former capital of, Binalud Rural District in the Central District of Nishapur County, Razavi Khorasan province, Iran. The capital of the rural district has been transferred to the village of Kalateh-ye Mohammad Jan.

== Demographics ==
=== Population ===
At the time of the 2006 National Census, the village's population was 394 in 103 households, when it was in the former Takht-e Jolgeh District. The following census in 2011 counted 316 people in 103 households, by which time the rural district had been transferred to the Central District. The 2016 census measured the population of the village as 342 people in 112 households.
