= Bandeh =

Bandeh (Persian: بنده) may refer to:

- Bandeh, Khuzestan
- Bandeh, Razavi Khorasan
