= Karan, Razavi Khorasan =

Village in Razavi Khorasan province, Iran

Karan Persian: كران
- Village
- Location within Iran
- Coordinates: 36°30′58″N 58°32′32″E
- Country: Iran
- Province: Razavi Khorasan
- County: Nishapur
- District: Central
- Rural District: Binalud

Population (2016)
  - Total: 204
- Time zone: UTC+3:30 (IRST)

Karan (Persian: كران) (Note: Also romanized as Karān and Karrān) is a village in Binalud Rural District of the Central District in Nishapur County, Razavi Khorasan province, Iran.

== Demographics ==
=== Population ===
At the time of the 2006 National Census, the village's population was 278 in 68 households, when it was in the former Takht-e Jolgeh District. The following census in 2011 counted 235 people in 68 households, by which time the rural district had been transferred to the Central District. The 2016 census measured the population of the village as 204 people in 63 households.
