= Karji Madan =

Village in Razavi Khorasan province, Iran

Karji Madan Persian: كارجي معدن
- Village
- Location within Iran
- Coordinates: 36°30′12″N 58°21′07″E
- Country: Iran
- Province: Razavi Khorasan
- County: Firuzeh
- District: Central
- Rural District: Firuzeh

Population (2016)
  - Total: 24
- Time zone: UTC+3:30 (IRST)

Karji Madan (Persian: كارجي معدن) (Note: Also romanized as Kārjī Maʿdan; also known as Kārjī (كارجي)) is a village in Firuzeh Rural District of the Central District in Firuzeh County, (Note: Formerly Takht-e Jolgeh County) Razavi Khorasan province, Iran.

== Demographics ==
=== Population ===
At the time of the 2006 National Census, the village's population was 60 in 14 households, when it was in the former Takht-e Jolgeh District of Nishapur County. The following census in 2011 counted 41 people in 12 households, by which time the district had been separated from the county in the establishment of Takht-e Jolgeh County. (Note: Renamed Firuzeh County) The rural district was transferred to the new Central District. The 2016 census measured the population of the village as 24 people in eight households.
