= Kalateh-ye Mohammad Jan =

Village in Razavi Khorasan province, Iran

Kalateh-ye Mohammad Jan Persian: كلاته محمد جان
- Village
- Location within Iran
- Coordinates: 36°32′04″N 58°30′21″E
- Country: Iran
- Province: Razavi Khorasan
- County: Nishapur
- District: Central
- Rural District: Binalud

Population (2016)
  - Total: 147
- Time zone: UTC+3:30 (IRST)

Kalateh-ye Mohammad Jan (Persian: كلاته محمدجان) (Note: Also romanized as Kalāteh-ye Moḩammad Jān) is a village in, and the capital of, Binalud Rural District in the Central District of Nishapur County, Razavi Khorasan province, Iran. The previous capital of the rural district was the village of Marusk.

== Demographics ==
=== Population ===
At the time of the 2006 National Census, the village's population was 202 in 60 households, when it was in the former Takht-e Jolgeh District. The following census in 2011 counted 183 people in 61 households, by which time the rural district had been transferred to the Central District. The 2016 census measured the population of the village as 147 people in 45 households.
