= Andar Ab, Razavi Khorasan =

Village in Razavi Khorasan province, Iran

Andar Ab Persian: اندراب
- Village
- Location within Iran
- Coordinates: 36°30′24″N 58°29′36″E
- Country: Iran
- Province: Razavi Khorasan
- County: Nishapur
- District: Central
- Rural District: Binalud

Population (2016)
  - Total: 198
- Time zone: UTC+3:30 (IRST)

Andar Ab (Persian: اندراب) (Note: Also romanized as Andar Āb) is a village in Binalud Rural District of the Central District in Nishapur County, Razavi Khorasan province, Iran.

== Demographics ==
=== Population ===
At the time of the 2006 National Census, the village's population was 201 in 56 households, when it was in the former Takht-e Jolgeh District. The following census in 2011 counted 161 people in 46 households, by which time the rural district had been transferred to the Central District. The 2016 census measured the population of the village as 198 people in 66 households.
