= Tuzandeh Jan-e Kohneh =

Tuzandeh Jan-e Kohneh توزنده جان كهنه
- Village
- Location within Iran
- Coordinates: 36°14′50.7″N 58°30′13.5″E
- Country: Iran
- Province: Razavi Khorasan
- County: Firuzeh
- Bakhsh: Taghenkoh
- Rural District: Taghenkoh-e Shomali

Population (2006)
  - Total: 277
- Time zone: UTC+3:30 (IRST)
  - Summer (DST): UTC+4:30 (IRDT)

Tuzandeh Jan-e Kohneh (Persian: توزنده جان كهنه, also Romanized as Tūzandeh Jān-e Kohneh; also known as Tūzand Jān) is a village in Taghenkoh-e Shomali Rural District, Taghenkoh District, Firuzeh County, Razavi Khorasan Province, Iran. At the 2006 census, its population was 277, in 76 families.

== َArcheology ==
Immediately northwest of the village is the ruined fortress of Tuzandeh Jan-e Kohneh, which takes its name from the village. The fortress dates to the Parthian and Sasanian periods and was in active use until the 13th century CE. Limited survey of the site was undertaken by Mahmoud Mousavi in 1986, which yielded a variety of ceramics and a couple bronze objects. The fortress has been partially destroyed by farming activity.
