= Karkhaneh-ye Qand =

Karkhaneh-ye Qand (Persian: كارخانه قند) may refer to:

- Karkhaneh-ye Qand, Hamadan
- Karkhaneh-ye Qand, Razavi Khorasan
- Karkhaneh-ye Qand-e Shirvan
