= Karji, Nishapur =

Karji كارجي
- Village
- Location within Iran
- Coordinates: 36°30′12″N 58°21′08″E
- Country: Iran
- Province: Razavi Khorasan
- County: Nishapur
- Bakhsh: Central
- Rural District: Binalud

Population (2006)
  - Total: 111
- Time zone: UTC+3:30 (IRST)
  - Summer (DST): UTC+4:30 (IRDT)

Karji (Persian: كارجي, also Romanized as Kārjī) is a village in Binalud Rural District, in the Central District of Nishapur County, Razavi Khorasan Province, Iran. At the 2006 census, its population was 111, in 25 families.

== See also ==
- Karji (Indian village)
- Karji, Firuzeh
