= Togan =

Togan may refer to:

- Togan Gökbakar (born 1984), Turkish film director
- Zeki Velidi Togan (1890–1970), Turkish historian
- Unkoku Togan (雲谷 等顔, 1547–1618), Japanese painter

== See also ==
- Tagan (disambiguation)
