= Sar Chah, Nishapur =

Village in Razavi Khorasan province, Iran

Sar Chah Persian: سرچاه
- Village
- Location within Iran
- Coordinates: 36°32′29″N 58°24′39″E
- Country: Iran
- Province: Razavi Khorasan
- County: Nishapur
- District: Central
- Rural District: Binalud

Population (2016)
  - Total: 1,951
- Time zone: UTC+3:30 (IRST)

Sar Chah (Persian: سرچاه) (Note: Also romanized as Sar Chāh) is a village in Binalud Rural District of the Central District in Nishapur County, Razavi Khorasan province, Iran.

== Demographics ==
=== Population ===
At the time of the 2006 National Census, the village's population was 1,674 in 423 households, when it was in the former Takht-e Jolgeh District. The following census in 2011 counted 1,541 people in 476 households, by which time the rural district had been transferred to the Central District. The 2016 census measured the population of the village as 1,951 people in 596 households, the most populous in its rural district.
