= Fahneh, Firuzeh =

Village in Razavi Khorasan province, Iran

Fahneh Persian: فهنه
- Village
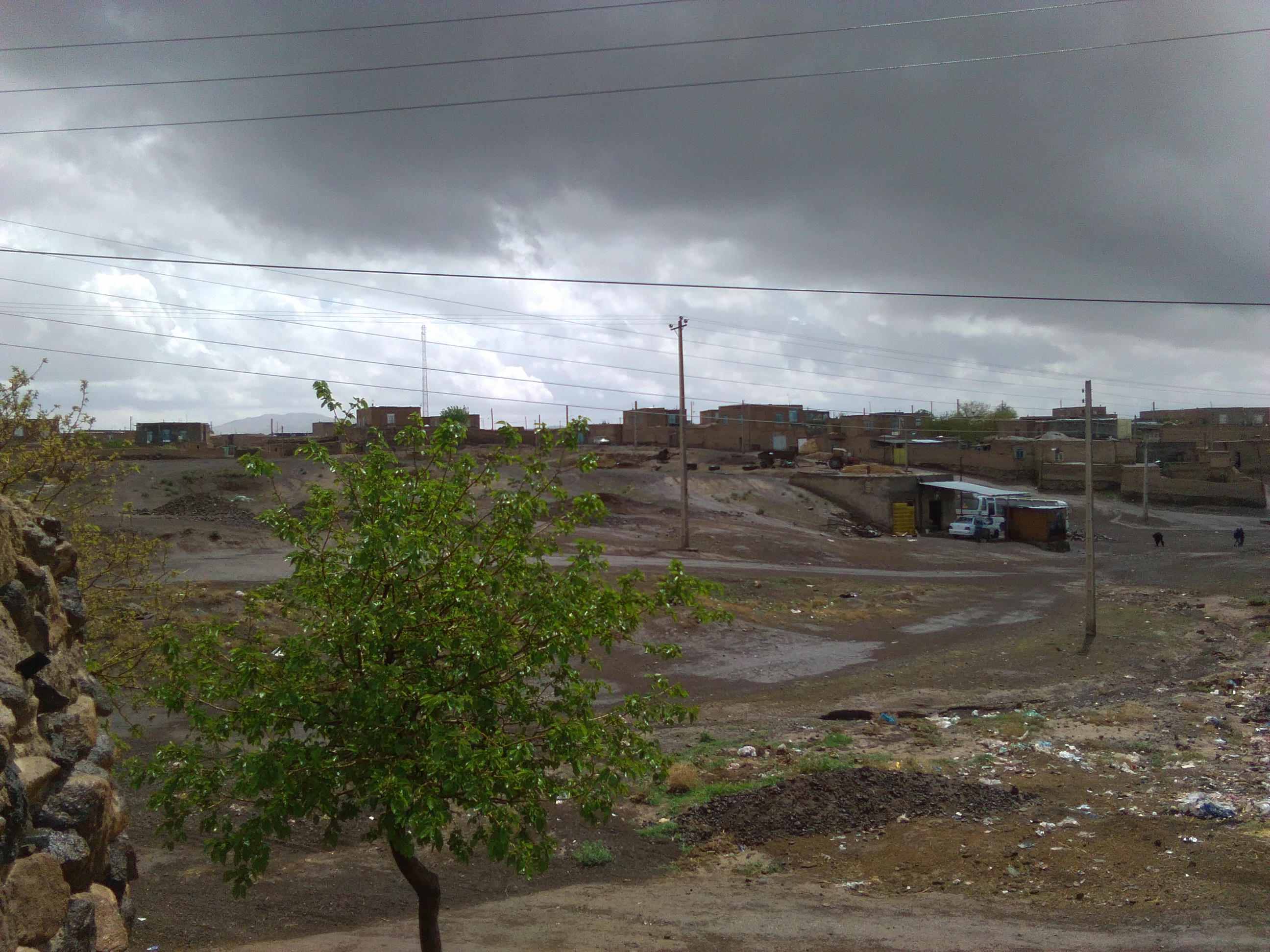
- The village of Fahneh

- Location within Iran
- Coordinates: 36°28′42″N 58°17′17″E
- Country: Iran
- Province: Razavi Khorasan
- County: Firuzeh
- District: Taghenkuh
- Rural District: Taghenkuh-e Shomali

Population (2016)
  - Total: 738
- Time zone: UTC+3:30 (IRST)

Fahneh (Persian: فهنه) (Note: Also known as Fahandar, Pahneh, and Pehna) is a village in Taghenkuh-e Shomali Rural District (Note: Formerly Taghenkuh Rural District) of Taghenkuh District in Firuzeh County, (Note: Formerly Takht-e Jolgeh County) Razavi Khorasan province, Iran.

== Demographics ==
=== Population ===
At the time of the 2006 National Census, the village's population was 855 in 197 households, when it was in Nishapur County. The following census in 2011 counted 783 people in 228 households, by which time the district had been separated from the county in the establishment of Takht-e Jolgeh County. (Note: Renamed Firuzeh County) The 2016 census measured the population of the village as 738 people in 213 households.
