= Barag Shahi =

Village in Razavi Khorasan province, Iran

Barag Shahi Persian: برگشاهي
- Village
- Location within Iran
- Coordinates: 36°37′59″N 58°31′39″E
- Country: Iran
- Province: Razavi Khorasan
- County: Nishapur
- District: Central
- Rural District: Binalud

Population (2016)
  - Total: 247
- Time zone: UTC+3:30 (IRST)

Barag Shahi (Persian: برگشاهي) (Note: Also romanized as Barag Shāhī and Barg Shāhī; also known as Barak Shāhī) is a village in Binalud Rural District of the Central District in Nishapur County, Razavi Khorasan province, Iran.

== Demographics ==
=== Population ===
At the time of the 2006 National Census, the village's population was 345 in 93 households, when it was in the former Takht-e Jolgeh District. The following census in 2011 counted 282 people in 90 households, by which time the rural district had been transferred to the Central District. The 2016 census measured the population of the village as 247 people in 77 households.
