= Garmab, Firuzeh =

City in Razavi Khorasan province, Iran

Garmab Persian: گرماب
- City
- Location within Iran
- Coordinates: 36°14′20″N 58°25′46″E
- Country: Iran
- Province: Razavi Khorasan
- County: Firuzeh
- District: Taghenkuh
- Established as a city: 2021

Population (2016)
  - Total: 4,316
- Time zone: UTC+3:30 (IRST)

Garmab (Persian: گرماب) (Note: Also romanized as Garmāb) is a city in Taghenkuh District of Firuzeh County, (Note: Formerly Takht-e Jolgeh County) Razavi Khorasan province, Iran. It was the administrative center for Taghenkuh-e Jonubi Rural District until its capital was transferred to the village of Shur Gesht.

== Demographics ==
=== Population ===
At the time of the 2006 National Census, Garmab's population was 4,220 in 968 households, when it was a village in Taghenkuh-e Jonubi Rural District of Nishapur County. The following census in 2011 counted 4,429 people in 1,111 households, by which time Taghenkuh District had been separated from the county in the establishment of Takht-e Jolgeh County (Note: Renamed Firuzeh County) The 2016 census measured the population of the village as 4,316 people in 1,198 households, the most populous in its rural district.

Garmab was converted to a city in 2021.
