= Telli =

Village in Razavi Khorasan province, Iran

Telli Persian: تلي
- Village
- Location within Iran
- Coordinates: 36°33′47″N 58°30′25″E
- Country: Iran
- Province: Razavi Khorasan
- County: Nishapur
- District: Central
- Rural District: Binalud

Population (2016)
  - Total: 265
- Time zone: UTC+3:30 (IRST)

Telli (Persian: تلي) (Note: Also romanized as Tellī) is a village in Binalud Rural District of the Central District in Nishapur County, Razavi Khorasan province, Iran.

== Demographics ==
=== Population ===
At the time of the 2006 National Census, the village's population was 354 in 82 households, when it was in the former Takht-e Jolgeh District. The following census in 2011 counted 279 people in 86 households, by which time the rural district had been transferred to the Central District. The 2016 census measured the population of the village as 265 people in 82 households.
