= Taghenkuh-e Jonubi Rural District =

Rural district in Razavi Khorasan province, Iran

Taghenkuh-e Jonubi Rural District Persian: دهستان طاغنكوه جنوبي
- Rural District
- Location within Iran
- Coordinates: 36°13′N 58°22′E
- Country: Iran
- Province: Razavi Khorasan
- County: Firuzeh
- District: Taghenkuh
- Established: 2004
- Capital: Shur Gesht

Population (2016)
  - Total: 6,070
- Time zone: UTC+3:30 (IRST)

Taghenkuh-e Jonubi Rural District (Persian: دهستان طاغنكوه جنوبي) is in Taghenkuh District of Firuzeh County, (Note: Formerly Takht-e Jolgeh County) Razavi Khorasan province, Iran. Its capital is the village of Shur Gesht. It was previously administered from the city of Garmab.

== Demographics ==
=== Population ===
At the time of the 2006 National Census, the rural district's population (as a part of Nishapur County) was 6,876 in 1,698 households. There were 6,571 inhabitants in 1,832 households at the following census of 2011, by which time the district had been separated from the county in the establishment of Takht-e Jolgeh County. (Note: Renamed Firuzeh County) The 2016 census measured the population of the rural district as 6,070 in 1,838 households. The most populous of its 26 villages was Garmab (now a city), with 4,316 people.

=== Other villages in the rural district ===
- Dastjerd
- Shurvarz
- Shuryab
- Zarvand
