= Qushkhaneh, Faruj =

Village in North Khorasan province, Iran

Qushkhaneh Persian: قوشخانه
- Village
- Location within Iran
- Coordinates: 36°59′49″N 58°13′06″E
- Country: Iran
- Province: North Khorasan
- County: Faruj
- District: Central
- Rural District: Sangar

Population (2016)
  - Total: 235
- Time zone: UTC+3:30 (IRST)

Qushkhaneh (Persian: قوشخانه) (Note: Also romanized as Qūshkhāneh; also known as Galeh Zīr) is a village in Sangar Rural District of the Central District in Faruj County, North Khorasan province, Iran.

== Demographics ==
=== Population ===
At the time of the 2006 National Census, the village's population was 327 in 101 households. The following census in 2011 counted 401 people in 132 households. The 2016 census measured the population of the village as 235 people in 95 households.
