= Sangar Rural District (Faruj County) =

Rural district in North Khorasan province, Iran

Sangar Rural District Persian: دهستان سنگر
- Rural District
- Location within Iran
- Coordinates: 36°59′N 58°10′E
- Country: Iran
- Province: North Khorasan
- County: Faruj
- District: Central
- Established: 1987
- Capital: Yengeh Qaleh

Population (2016)
  - Total: 5,641
- Time zone: UTC+3:30 (IRST)

Sangar Rural District (Persian: دهستان سنگر) is in the Central District of Faruj County, North Khorasan province, Iran. Its capital is the village of Yengeh Qaleh.

== Demographics ==
=== Population ===
At the time of the 2006 National Census, the rural district's population was 7,394 in 1,870 households. There were 8,381 inhabitants in 2,364 households at the following census of 2011. The 2016 census measured the population of the rural district as 5,641 in 1,906 households. The most populous of its 27 villages was Kharaq, with 1,418 people.

=== Other villages in the rural district ===
- Amirabad
- Armud Aqachi
- Bash Mahalleh
- Birak-e Sofla
- Qareh Cheshmeh
- Qushkhaneh
