= Firuzeh =

City in Razavi Khorasan Province, Iran

Firuzeh Persian: فيروزه
- City
- Location within Iran
- Coordinates: 36°17′05″N 58°35′19″E
- Country: Iran
- Province: Razavi Khorasan
- County: Firuzeh
- District: Central
- Established as a city: 1995

Population (2016)
  - Total: 5,884
- Time zone: UTC+3:30 (IRST)

Firuzeh (Persian: فيروزه) (Note: Also romanized as Fīrūzeh (English: turquoise); formerly known as Bozghan (بزغان), also romanized as Bozghān;) is a city in the Central District of Firuzeh County, (Note: Formerly Takht-e Jolgeh County) Razavi Khorasan province, Iran, serving as capital of both the county and the district. It was the administrative center for Takht-e Jolgeh Rural District until its capital was transferred to the village of Bozquchan. The village of Bozghan was converted to a city in 1995 and renamed Firuzeh in 2011.

== Demographics ==
=== Population ===
At the time of the 2006 National Census, the city's population was 4,906 in 1,288 households, when it was capital of the former Takht-e Jolgeh District in Nishapur County. The following census in 2011 counted 5,769 people in 1,575 households, by which time the district had been separated from the county in the establishment of Takht-e Jolgeh County. (Note: Renamed Firuzeh County) Firuzeh was transferred to the new Central District as the county's capital. The 2016 census measured the population of the city as 5,884 people in 1,740 households.
