= Tagan =

Tagan may refer to the following places:

- Tagan, Iran, a village in Dargaz County, Razavi Khorasan province, Iran
- Taqan, a village in Firuzeh County, Razavi Khorasan province, Iran
- Taghan, a village in South Khorasan province, Iran
