= Yengeh Qaleh, Faruj =

Village in North Khorasan province, Iran

Yengeh Qaleh Persian: ينگه قلعه
- Village
- Location within Iran
- Coordinates: 36°59′42″N 58°16′00″E
- Country: Iran
- Province: North Khorasan
- County: Faruj
- District: Central
- Rural District: Sangar

Population (2016)
  - Total: 408
- Time zone: UTC+3:30 (IRST)

Yengeh Qaleh (Persian: ينگه قلعه) (Note: Also romanized as Yengeh Qal‘eh) is a village in, and the capital of, Sangar Rural District in the Central District of Faruj County, North Khorasan province, Iran.

== Demographics ==
=== Population ===
At the time of the 2006 National Census, the village's population was 717 in 161 households. The following census in 2011 counted 661 people in 204 households. The 2016 census measured the population of the village as 408 people in 124 households.
