= Binalud Rural District =

Rural district in Razavi Khorasan province, Iran

Binalud Rural District Persian: دهستان بینالود
- Rural District
- Location within Iran
- Coordinates: 36°34′N 58°35′E
- Country: Iran
- Province: Razavi Khorasan
- County: Nishapur
- District: Central
- Established: 1987
- Capital: Kalateh-ye Mohammad Jan

Population (2016)
  - Total: 5,635
- Time zone: UTC+3:30 (IRST)

Binalud Rural District (Persian: دهستان بینالود) is in the Central District of Nishapur County, Razavi Khorasan province, Iran. Its capital is the village of Kalateh-ye Mohammad Jan. The previous capital of the rural district was the village of Marusk.

== Demographics ==
=== Population ===
At the time of the 2006 National Census, the rural district's population (as a part of the former Takht-e Jolgeh District) was 7,006 in 1,751 households. There were 5,742 inhabitants in 1,741 households at the following census of 2011, by which time the rural district had been transferred to the Central District. The 2016 census measured the population of the rural district as 5,635 in 1,770 households. The most populous of its 60 villages was Sar Chah, with 1,951 people.

=== Other villages in the rural district ===
- Andar Ab
- Baqi
- Barag Shahi
- Bojnu-ye Olya
- Chahar Gushli
- Karan
- Telli
