= Galib Ran Singh =

- Village
- Location in Punjab, India Galib Ran Singh (India)
- Coordinates: 30.860375°N 75.389793°E
- Country: India
- State: Punjab
- District: Ludhiana
- Tehsil: Jagraon

Government
  - Type: Panchayat raj
  - Body: Gram panchayat
- Elevation: 239 m (784 ft)

Population (2011)
  - Total: 1,235
- Sex ratio 682/553 ♂/♀

Languages
  - Official: Punjabi
- Time zone: UTC+5:30 (IST)
- Telephone: 01624
- ISO 3166 code: IN-PB
- Vehicle registration: PB- 10
- Website: ludhiana.nic.in

Galib Ran Singh is a village in Jagraon in Ludhiana district of Punjab State, India. It is located 24 kilometres (15 mi) from Moga, 39 kilometres (24 mi) from Nakodar, 50 kilometres (31 mi) from district headquarter Ludhiana and 157 kilometres (98 mi) from state capital Chandigarh. The village is administrated by Sarpanch an elected representative of the village.

== Demography ==
As of 2011, The village has a total number of 225 houses and the population of 1235 of which 682 are males while 553 are females according to the report published by Census India in 2011. The literacy rate of the village is 78.39%, lower than the state average of 75.84%. The population of children under the age of 6 years is 129 which is 10.45% of total population of the village, and child sex ratio is approximately 870 lower than the state average of 846.

Most of the people are from Schedule Caste which constitutes 29.07% of total population in the village. The town does not have any Schedule Tribe population so far.

As per census 2011, 589 people were engaged in work activities out of the total population of the village which includes 418 males and 171 females. According to census survey report 2011, 57.39% workers describe their work as main work and 42.61% workers are involved in marginal activity providing livelihood for less than 6 months.

== Transport ==
Nanaksar railway station is the nearest train station. The village is 68 kilometres (42 mi) away from domestic airport in Ludhiana and 141 kilometres (88 mi) away from Sri Guru Ram Dass Jee International Airport is located in Amritsar.

== See also ==
- List of villages in India
