= Qareh Cheshmeh, North Khorasan =

Village in North Khorasan province, Iran

Qareh Cheshmeh Persian: قره چشمه
- Village
- Location within Iran
- Coordinates: 37°03′18″N 58°09′35″E
- Country: Iran
- Province: North Khorasan
- County: Faruj
- District: Central
- Rural District: Sangar

Population (2016)
  - Total: 378
- Time zone: UTC+3:30 (IRST)

Qareh Cheshmeh (Persian: قره چشمه) (Note: Also romanized as Qarah Chashmeh) is a village in Sangar Rural District of the Central District in Faruj County, North Khorasan province, Iran.

== Demographics ==
=== Population ===
At the time of the 2006 National Census, the village's population was 571 in 115 households. The following census in 2011 counted 473 people in 96 households. The 2016 census measured the population of the village as 378 people in 101 households.
