= Kharaq, North Khorasan =

Village in North Khorasan province, Iran

Kharaq Persian: خرق
- Village
- Location within Iran
- Coordinates: 36°57′05″N 58°00′57″E
- Country: Iran
- Province: North Khorasan
- County: Faruj
- District: Central
- Rural District: Sangar

Population (2016)
  - Total: 1,418
- Time zone: UTC+3:30 (IRST)

Kharaq (Persian: خرق) (Note: Also romanized as Kharq; also known as Darreh-ye Palangābād) is a village in Sangar Rural District of the Central District in Faruj County, North Khorasan province, Iran.

== Demographics ==
=== Population ===
At the time of the 2006 National Census, the village's population was 1,110 in 358 households. The following census in 2011 counted 2,203 people in 636 households. The 2016 census measured the population of the village as 1,418 people in 498 households, the most populous in its rural district.
