= Hemmatabad =

City in Razavi Khorasan province, Iran

Hemmatabad Persian: همت اباد
- City
- Location within Iran
- Coordinates: 36°17′54″N 58°27′49″E
- Country: Iran
- Province: Razavi Khorasan
- County: Firuzeh
- District: Taghenkuh
- Established as a city: 2008

Population (2016)
  - Total: 1,274
- Time zone: UTC+3:30 (IRST)

Hemmatabad (Persian: همت اباد) (Note: Also romanized as Hemmatābād; also known as Hemmatābād-e Shahr Kohneh, Hemmatābād-e Zamānābād, Himmatābād, and Unafābād) is a city in, and the capital of, Taghenkuh District in Firuzeh County, (Note: Formerly Takht-e Jolgeh County) Razavi Khorasan province, Iran. It also serves as the administrative center for Taghenkuh-e Shomali Rural District. (Note: Formerly Taghenkuh Rural District)

== Demographics ==
=== Population ===
At the time of the 2006 National Census, Hemmatabad's population was 1,264 in 345 households, when it was a village in Taghenkuh-e Shomali Rural District of Nishapur County. The following census in 2011 counted 1,434 people in 364 households, by which time Taghenkuh District had been separated from the county in the establishment of Takht-e Jolgeh County. (Note: Renamed Firuzeh County) In addition, Hemmatabad had been converted to a city. The 2016 census measured the population of the city as 1,274 people in 377 households.
