= Charbagh, Mansehra =

Charbagh
- Location within Pakistan
- Coordinates: 34.30°N 73.01°E
- Country: Pakistan
- Province: Khyber-Pakhtunkhwa
- Elevation: 1,154 m (3,786 ft)
- Time zone: UTC+5 (PST)

Charbagh is a town in Khyber-Pakhtunkhwa province of Pakistan. It is part of Mansehra District and is located at 34°30'5N 73°1'20E with an altitude of 1154 metres (3789 feet).
