= Galeb =

Galeb is Bosnian/Croatian/Serbian and Slovenian word for "seagull". It may refer to:

- Galeb-class minelayer, in service with Yugoslav navies between 1921 and 1962
- Yugoslav Navy Yacht Galeb, presidential yacht used by Josip Broz Tito
- Series of Yugoslavian trainer/attack jet aircraft designs two of which entered production:
  - Soko G-2 Galeb, first flown in 1961
  - Soko G-4 Super Galeb, first flown in 1978
- Galeb (computer), a Yugoslav-made home computer from the early 1980s

Unrelated to south Slavs, there are also:

- Galeb duhr, a creature in Dungeons & Dragons fantasy role-playing game
- Yacin Yabeh Galeb, chief of staff of Force Nationale de Police of Djibouti 1977–2000
