= Shuri Koyama =

Japanese footballer

Personal information
- Date of birth: 24 January 1999 (age 27)
- Place of birth: Saitama, Japan
- Height: 1.84 m (6 ft 0 in)
- Position: Defender

Team information
- Current team: Gainare Tottori
- Number: 22

Youth career
- Hasuda Kickers
- Seiritz Zebra FC
- –2016: Seiritsu Gakuen HS
- 2017–2020: Tokyo University of Agriculture

Senior career*
Years	Team	Apps	(Gls)
2021–	Gainare Tottori	1	(0)
- * Club domestic league appearances and goals as of 17:04, 28 March 2021 (UTC)

Shuri Koyama (小山 珠里, Koyama Shuri; born 24 January 1999) is a Japanese footballer currently playing as a defender for Gainare Tottori.

== Career statistics ==
=== Club ===
As of 27 March 2021.

Club	Season	League			National Cup		League Cup		Other		Total	
Club	Season	Division	Apps	Goals	Apps	Goals	Apps	Goals	Apps	Goals	Apps	Goals
Gainare Tottori	2021	J3 League	1	0	0	0	–		0	0	1	0
Career total			1	0	0	0	0	0	0	0	1	0
