= Nayyerabad, Isfahan =

Nayyerabad نيراباد
- Village
- Location within Iran
- Coordinates: 33°34′01″N 52°25′45″E
- Country: Iran
- Province: Isfahan
- County: Ardestan
- Bakhsh: Zavareh
- Rural District: Rigestan

Population (2006)
  - Total: 150
- Time zone: UTC+3:30 (IRST)
  - Summer (DST): UTC+4:30 (IRDT)

Nayyerabad (Persian: نيراباد, also Romanized as Nayyerābād and Nīrābād) is a village in Rigestan Rural District, Zavareh District, Ardestan County, Isfahan Province, Iran. At the 2006 census, its population was 150, in 44 families.
