= Kharq, Razavi Khorasan =

Kharq خرق
- Village
- Location within Iran
- Coordinates: 36°32′42″N 59°35′26″E
- Country: Iran
- Province: Razavi Khorasan
- County: Mashhad
- Bakhsh: Central
- Rural District: Darzab

Population (2006)
  - Total: 260
- Time zone: UTC+3:30 (IRST)
  - Summer (DST): UTC+4:30 (IRDT)

Kharq (Persian: خرق; also known as Kharo) is a village in Darzab Rural District, in the Central District of Mashhad County, Razavi Khorasan Province, Iran. At the 2006 census, its population was 260, in 57 families.
