= Galib Kalan =

- Village
- Location in Punjab, India Galib Kalan (India)
- Coordinates: 30.8371721°N 75.3901576°E
- Country: India
- State: Punjab
- District: Ludhiana
- Tehsil: Jagraon

Government
  - Type: Panchayat raj
  - Body: Gram panchayat
- Elevation: 239 m (784 ft)

Population (2011)
  - Total: 6,825
- Sex ratio 3579/3246 ♂/♀

Languages
  - Official: Punjabi
- Time zone: UTC+5:30 (IST)
- ISO 3166 code: IN-PB
- Vehicle registration: PB- 10
- Website: ludhiana.nic.in

Galib Kalan is a village in Jagraon in Ludhiana district of Punjab State, India. It is located 23 kilometres (14 mi) from Moga, 39 kilometres (24 mi) from Nakodar, 47 kilometres (29 mi) from district headquarter Ludhiana and 155 kilometres (96 mi) from state capital Chandigarh. The village is administrated by Sarpanch an elected representative of the village.

== Demography ==
As of 2011, The village has a total number of 1316 houses and the population of 6825 of which 3579 are males while 3246 are females according to the report published by Census India in 2011. The literacy rate of the village is 7311%, lower than the state average of 80.36%. The population of children under the age of 6 years is 759 which is 11.12% of total population of the village, and child sex ratio is approximately 568 lower than the state average of 846.

Most of the people are from Schedule Caste which constitutes 44.84% of total population in the village. The town does not have any Schedule Tribe population so far.

As per census 2011, 2,060 people were engaged in work activities out of the total population of the village which includes 1913 males and 147 females. According to census survey report 2011, 97.57% workers describe their work as main work and 2.43% workers are involved in marginal activity providing livelihood for less than 6 months.

== Transport ==
Nanaksar railway station is the nearest train station. The village is 65 kilometres (40 mi) away from domestic airport in Ludhiana and 139 kilometres (86 mi) away from Sri Guru Ram Dass Jee International Airport is located in Amritsar.

== See also ==
- List of villages in India
