= Kafki, South Khorasan =

Kafki كفكي
- Village
- Location within Iran
- Coordinates: 32°43′33″N 59°23′53″E
- Country: Iran
- Province: South Khorasan
- County: Birjand
- Bakhsh: Central
- Rural District: Baqeran

Population (2006)
  - Total: 43
- Time zone: UTC+3:30 (IRST)
  - Summer (DST): UTC+4:30 (IRDT)

Kafki (Persian: كفكي, also Romanized as Kafkī and Kafgi; also known as Kafgīr) is a village in Baqeran Rural District, in the Central District of Birjand County, South Khorasan Province, Iran. At the 2006 census, its population was 43, in 17 families.
