= Firuzeh Rural District =

Rural district in Razavi Khorasan province, Iran

Firuzeh Rural District Persian: دهستان فیروزه
- Rural District
- Location within Iran
- Coordinates: 36°26′N 58°30′E
- Country: Iran
- Province: Razavi Khorasan
- County: Firuzeh
- District: Central
- Established: 1987
- Capital: Qalibaf-e Sofla

Population (2016)
  - Total: 2,907
- Time zone: UTC+3:30 (IRST)

Firuzeh Rural District (Persian: دهستان فیروزه) is in the Central District of Firuzeh County, (Note: Formerly Takht-e Jolgeh County) Razavi Khorasan province, Iran. Its capital is the village of Qalibaf-e Sofla.

== Demographics ==
=== Population ===
At the time of the 2006 National Census, the rural district's population (as a part of the former Takht-e Jolgeh District in Nishapur County) was 9,292 in 2,322 households. There were 3,158 inhabitants in 949 households at the following census of 2011, by which time the district had been separated from the county in the establishment of Takht-e Jolgeh County. (Note: Renamed Firuzeh County) The rural district was transferred to the new Central District. The 2016 census measured the population of the rural district as 2,907 in 928 households. The most populous of its 44 villages was Madan-e Olya, with 579 people.

=== Other villages in the rural district ===
- Ahmadabad
- Aliabad
- Chaq Qarah
- Golshanabad
- Gozar
- Hesar Now
- Karji Madan
- Madan-e Sofla
- Malakh Darreh-ye Sofla
- Qaleh Hasan
- Qalibaf-e Olya
- Robati Gharbatha
- Vaziriyeh
- Zavang-e Olya
- Zavang-e Sofla
