= Takht-e Jolgeh Rural District =

Rural district in Razavi Khorasan province, Iran

Takht-e Jolgeh Rural District Persian: دهستان تخت جلگه
- Rural District
- Location within Iran
- Coordinates: 36°13′N 58°33′E
- Country: Iran
- Province: Razavi Khorasan
- County: Firuzeh
- District: Central
- Established: 1987
- Capital: Bozquchan

Population (2016)
  - Total: 11,996
- Time zone: UTC+3:30 (IRST)

Takht-e Jolgeh Rural District (Persian: دهستان تخت جلگه) is in the Central District of Firuzeh County, (Note: Formerly Takht-e Jolgeh County) Razavi Khorasan province, Iran. Its capital is the village of Bozquchan. The rural district was previously administered from the city of Firuzeh. (Note: Formerly the village of Bozghan)

== Demographics ==
=== Population ===
At the time of the 2006 National Census, the rural district's population (as a part of the former Takht-e Jolgeh District in Nishapur County) was 13,063 in 3,309 households. There were 12,586 inhabitants in 3,749 households at the following census of 2011, by which time the district had been separated from the county in the establishment of Takht-e Jolgeh County. (Note: Renamed Firuzeh County) The rural district was transferred to the new Central District. The 2016 census measured the population of the rural district as 11,996 in 3,813 households. The most populous of its 65 villages was Hemmatabad-e Zamani, with 1,568 people.

=== Other villages in the rural district ===
- Kafki
- Motamadiyeh
- Najafabad
- Sar Deh
- Shuri-ye Bozorg
- Taqiabad
- Yengeh Qaleh
