= Taghenkuh-e Shomali Rural District =

Rural district in Razavi Khorasan province, Iran

Taghenkuh-e Shomali Rural District Persian: دهستان طاغنكوه شمالي
- Rural District
- Location within Iran
- Coordinates: 36°24′N 58°21′E
- Country: Iran
- Province: Razavi Khorasan
- County: Firuzeh
- District: Taghenkuh
- Established: 1987
- Capital: Hemmatabad

Population (2016)
  - Total: 9,408
- Time zone: UTC+3:30 (IRST)

Taghenkuh-e Shomali Rural District (Persian: دهستان طاغنكوه شمالي) (Note: Formerly Taghenkuh Rural District (دهستان طاغنكوه)) is in Taghenkuh District of Firuzeh County, (Note: Formerly Takht-e Jolgeh County) Razavi Khorasan province, Iran. It is administered from the city of Hemmatabad.

== Demographics ==
=== Population ===
At the time of the 2006 National Census, the rural district's population (as a part of Nishapur County) was 15,686 in 3,964 households. There were 13,221 inhabitants in 3,891 households at the following census of 2011, by which time the district had been separated from the county in the establishment of Takht-e Jolgeh County. (Note: Renamed Firuzeh County) The 2016 census measured the population of the rural district as 9,408 in 3,087 households. The most populous of its 54 villages was Marzan, with 1,257 people.

=== Other villages in the rural district ===
- Batu
- Fahneh
- Qaleh Dozdan
- Qarah Bagh
- Shurab
- Soleymani
