= Taghenkuh District =

District in Razavi Khorasan province, Iran

Taghenkuh District Persian: بخش طاغنکوه
- District
- Location within Iran
- Coordinates: 36°21′N 58°22′E
- Country: Iran
- Province: Razavi Khorasan
- County: Firuzeh
- Established: 2004
- Capital: Hemmatabad

Population (2016)
  - Total: 16,752
- Time zone: UTC+3:30 (IRST)

Taghenkuh District (Persian: بخش طاغنکوه) is in Firuzeh County, (Note: Formerly Takht-e Jolgeh County) Razavi Khorasan province, Iran. Its capital is the city of Hemmatabad.

== History ==
The village of Hemmatabad was converted to a city in 2008, and the village of Garmab became a city in 2021.

== Demographics ==
=== Population ===
At the time of the 2006 National Census, the district's population (as a part of Nishapur County) was 22,562 in 5,662 households. The following census in 2011 counted 21,226 people in 6,087 households, by which time the district had been separated from the county in the establishment of Talkt-e Jolgeh County. (Note: Renamed Firuzeh County) The 2016 census measured the population of the district as 16,752 inhabitants in 5,302 households.

=== Administrative divisions ===
Taghenkuh District Population (Note: As a part of Nishapur County at the 2006 census)
Administrative Divisions	2006	2011	2016
Taghenkuh-e Jonubi RD	6,876	6,571	6,070
Taghenkuh-e Shomali RD (Note: Formerly Taghenkuh Rural District)	15,686	13,221	9,408
Garmab (city) (Note: Became a city after the 2016 census)			
Hemmatabad (city)		1,434	1,274
Total	22,562	21,226	16,752
RD = Rural District
