= Takht-e Jolgeh District =

Former district in Razavi Khorasan province, Iran

Takht-e Jolgeh District Persian: بخش تخت جلگه
- Former District
- Location within Iran
- Coordinates: 36°18′N 58°34′E
- Country: Iran
- Province: Razavi Khorasan
- County: Nishapur
- Capital: Firuzeh

Population (2006)
  - Total: 34,267
- Time zone: UTC+3:30 (IRST)

Takht-e Jolgeh District (Persian: بخش تخت جلگه) is a former administrative division of Nishapur County, Razavi Khorasan province, Iran. Its capital was the city of Firuzeh. (Note: Formerly the village of Bozghan)

== History ==
In 2007, The district was separated from the county in the establishment of Takht-e Jolgeh County. (Note: Renamed Firuzeh County)

== Demographics ==
=== Population ===
At the time of the 2006 National Census, the district's population was 34,267 in 8,670 households.

=== Administrative divisions ===
Takht-e Jolgeh District Population
Administrative Divisions	2006
Binalud RD (Note: Transferred to the Central District after the 2006 census)	7,006
Firuzeh RD	9,292
Takht-e Jolgeh RD	13,063
Firuzeh (city)	4,906
Total	34,267
RD = Rural District
