= Central District (Firuzeh County) =

District in Razavi Khorasan province, Iran

Central District (Firuzeh County) Persian: بخش مرکزی شهرستان فیروزه
- District
- Location within Iran
- Coordinates: 36°18′N 58°34′E
- Country: Iran
- Province: Razavi Khorasan
- County: Firuzeh
- Established: 2007
- Capital: Firuzeh

Population (2016)
  - Total: 20,787
- Time zone: UTC+3:30 (IRST)

The Central District of Firuzeh County (Note: Formerly Takht-e Jolgeh County) (Persian: بخش مرکزی شهرستان فیروزه) is in Razavi Khorasan province, Iran. Its capital is the city of Firuzeh. (Note: Formerly the village of Bozghan)

== History ==
In 2007, Taghenkuh and Takht-e Jolgeh Districts were separated from Nishapur County in the establishment of Takht-e Jolgeh County (Note: Renamed Firuzeh County), which was divided into two districts of two rural districts each, with Firuzeh as its capital.

== Demographics ==
=== Population ===
At the time of the 2011 National Census, the district's population was 21,513 was 6,273 households. The 2016 census measured the population of the district as 20,787 inhabitants in 6,481 households.

=== Administrative divisions ===
Central District (Firuzeh County) Population
| Administrative Divisions | 2011 | 2016 |
|---|---|---|
| Firuzeh RD | 3,158 | 2,907 |
| Takht-e Jolgeh RD | 12,586 | 11,996 |
| Firuzeh (city) | 5,769 | 5,884 |
| Total | 21,513 | 20,787 |
RD = Rural District
