= Firuzeh County =

County in Razavi Khorasan Province, Iran

Firuzeh County شهرستان فیروزه
- County
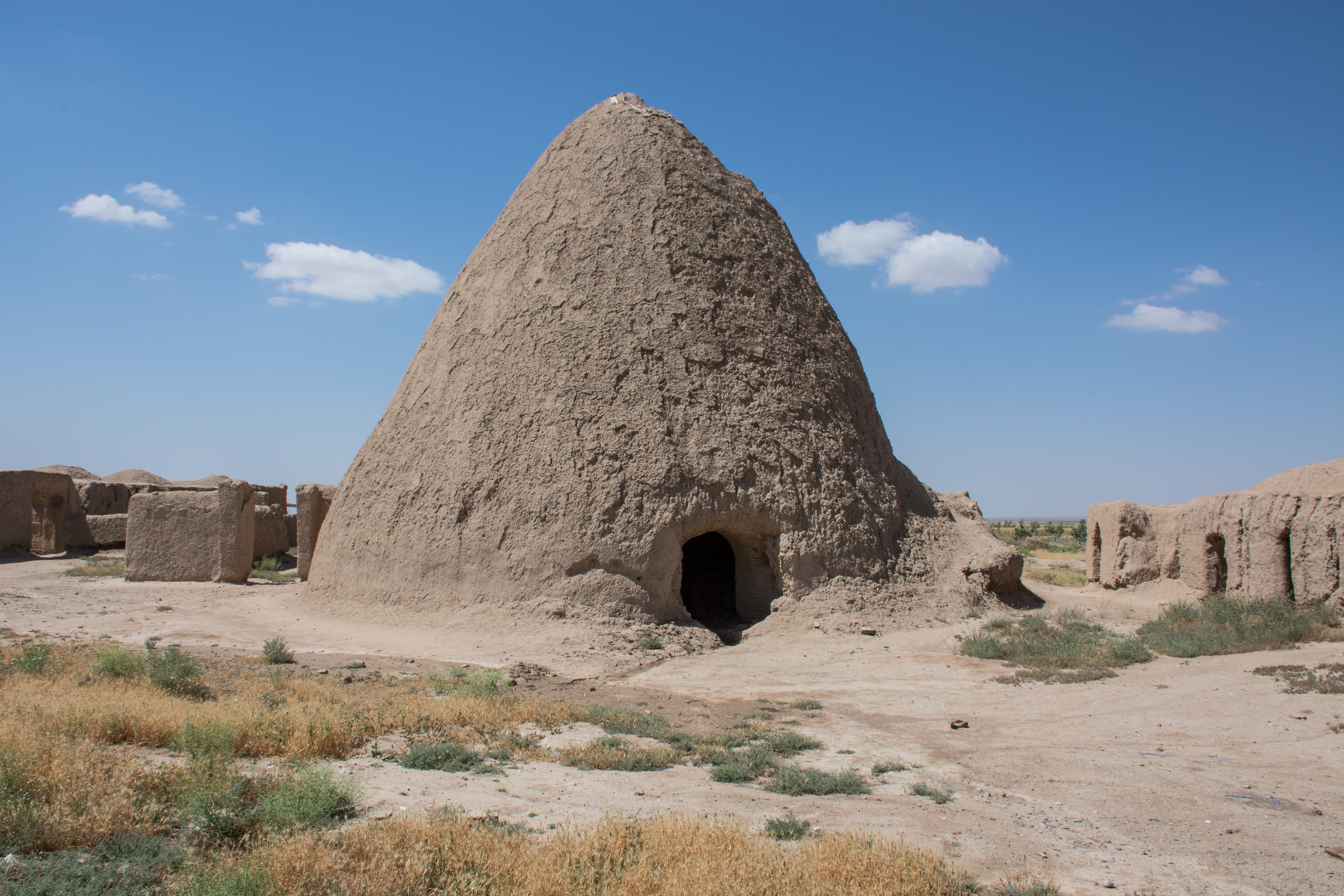
- Ice house in the village of Bahrud

- Location of Firuzeh County in Razavi Khorasan province (center left, purple)

- Location of Razavi Khorasan province in Iran
- Coordinates: 36°18′N 58°26′E
- Country: Iran
- Province: Razavi Khorasan
- Established: 2007
- Capital: Firuzeh
- Districts: Central, Taghenkoh

Area
  - Total: 1,490 km^{2} (580 sq mi)
- Elevation: 1,200 m (3,900 ft)

Population (2016)
  - Total: 37,539
  - Density: 25.2/km^{2} (65.3/sq mi)
- Time zone: UTC+3:30 (IRST)

Firuzeh County (Persian: شهرستان فیروزه) (Note: Formerly Takht-e Jolgeh County (شهرستان تخت جلگه)) is in Razavi Khorasan province, Iran. Its capital is the city of Firuzeh. (Note: Formerly the village of Bozghan)

== History ==
In 2007, Taghenkuh and Takht-e Jolgeh Districts were separated from Nishapur County in the establishment of Takht-e Jolgeh County, (Note: Renamed Firuzeh County) which was divided into two districts of two rural districts each, with Firuzeh as its capital.

The village of Garmab was converted to a city in 2021.

== Demographics ==
=== Population ===
At the time of the 2011 National Census, the county's population was 42,739 people in 12,351 households. The 2016 census measured the population of the county as 37,539 in 11,783 households.

=== Administrative divisions ===
Firuzeh County's population history and administrative structure over two consecutive censuses are shown in the following table.

Firuzeh County Population
Administrative Divisions	2011	2016
Central District	21,513	20,787
Firuzeh RD	3,158	2,907
Takht-e Jolgeh RD	12,586	11,996
Firuzeh (city)	5,769	5,884
Taghenkuh District	21,226	16,752
Taghenkuh-e Jonubi RD	6,571	6,070
Taghenkuh-e Shomali RD (Note: Formerly Taghenkuh Rural District)	13,221	9,408
Garmab (city) (Note: Became a city after the 2016 census)		
Hemmatabad (city)	1,434	1,274
Total	42,739	37,539
RD = Rural District

== See also ==
Media related to Firuzeh County at Wikimedia Commons
