= Hasanabad, Khoshab =

Village in Razavi Khorasan province, Iran

Hasanabad Persian: حسن اباد
- Village
- Location within Iran
- Coordinates: 36°26′02″N 57°44′27″E
- Country: Iran
- Province: Razavi Khorasan
- County: Khoshab
- District: Now Deh-e Anqolab
- Rural District: Now Deh-e Anqolab

Population (2016)
  - Total: 101
- Time zone: UTC+3:30 (IRST)

Hasanabad (Persian: حسن اباد) (Note: Also romanized as Ḩasanābād) is a village in Now Deh-e Anqolab Rural District of Now Deh-e Anqolab District in Khoshab County, Razavi Khorasan province, Iran.

== Demographics ==
=== Population ===
At the time of the 2006 National Census, the village's population was 200 in 63 households, when it was in Tabas Rural District of the former Khoshab District in Sabzevar County. The following census in 2011 counted 120 people in 51 households, by which time the district had been separated from the county in the establishment of Khoshab County. The rural district was transferred to the new Central District. The 2016 census measured the population of the village as 101 people in 43 households.

In 2019, the rural district was separated from the district in the formation of Now Deh-e Anqolab District, and Hasanabad was transferred to Now Deh-e Anqolab Rural District created in the new district.
