= Jannatabad, Khoshab =

Village in Razavi Khorasan province, Iran

Jannatabad Persian: جنت اباد
- Village
- Location within Iran
- Coordinates: 36°29′04″N 57°38′02″E
- Country: Iran
- Province: Razavi Khorasan
- County: Khoshab
- District: Now Deh-e Anqolab
- Rural District: Now Deh-e Anqolab

Population (2016)
  - Total: 373
- Time zone: UTC+3:30 (IRST)

Jannatabad (Persian: جنت‌آباد) (Note: Also romanized as Jannatābād) is a village in Now Deh-e Anqolab Rural District of Now Deh-e Anqolab District in Khoshab County, Razavi Khorasan province, Iran.

== Demographics ==
=== Population ===
At the time of the 2006 National Census, the village's population was 381 in 107 households, when it was in Tabas Rural District of the former Khoshab District in Sabzevar County. The following census in 2011 counted 397 people in 115 households, by which time the district had been separated from the county in the establishment of Khoshab County. The rural district was transferred to the new Central District. The 2016 census measured the population of the village as 373 people in 125 households.

In 2019, the rural district was separated from the district in the formation of Now Deh-e Anqolab District, and Jannatabad was transferred to Now Deh-e Anqolab Rural District created in the new district.
