= Cheru, Razavi Khorasan =

Village in Razavi Khorasan province, Iran

Cheru Persian: چرو
- Village
- Location within Iran
- Coordinates: 36°28′01″N 57°42′04″E
- Country: Iran
- Province: Razavi Khorasan
- County: Khoshab
- District: Now Deh-e Anqolab
- Rural District: Now Deh-e Anqolab

Population (2016)
  - Total: 532
- Time zone: UTC+3:30 (IRST)

Cheru (Persian: چرو) (Note: Also romanized as Cherū; also known as Chervī) is a village in, and the capital of, Now Deh-e Anqolab Rural District in Now Deh-e Anqolab District of Khoshab County, Razavi Khorasan province, Iran.

== Demographics ==
=== Population ===
At the time of the 2006 National Census, the village's population was 653 in 204 households, when it was in Tabas Rural District of the former Khoshab District in Sabzevar County. The following census in 2011 counted 649 people in 199 households, by which time the district had been separated from the county in the establishment of Khoshab County. The rural district was transferred to the new Central District. The 2016 census measured the population of the village as 532 people in 180 households.

In 2019, the rural district was separated from the district in the formation of Now Deh-e Anqolab District, and Cheru was transferred to Now Deh-e Anqolab Rural District created in the new district.
