= Annabestan =

Village in Razavi Khorasan province, Iran

Annabestan Persian: عنابستان
- Village
- Location within Iran
- Coordinates: 36°22′23″N 57°51′36″E
- Country: Iran
- Province: Razavi Khorasan
- County: Khoshab
- District: Now Deh-e Anqolab
- Rural District: Tabas

Population (2016)
  - Total: 56
- Time zone: UTC+3:30 (IRST)

Annabestan (Persian: عنابستان) (Note: Also romanized as ‘Annābestān) is a village in Tabas Rural District of Now Deh-e Anqolab District in Khoshab County, Razavi Khorasan province, Iran.

== Demographics ==
=== Population ===
At the time of the 2006 National Census, the village's population was 81 in 34 households, when it was in the former Khoshab District of Sabzevar County. The following census in 2011 counted 52 people in 25 households, by which time the district had been separated from the county in the establishment of Khoshab County. The rural district was transferred to the new Central District. The 2016 census measured the population of the village as 56 people in 24 households.

In 2019, the rural district was separated from the district in the formation of Now Deh-e Anqolab District.
