= Dargahabad =

Village in Razavi Khorasan province, Iran

Dargahabad Persian: درگاه اباد
- Village
- Location within Iran
- Coordinates: 36°49′22″N 58°06′40″E
- Country: Iran
- Province: Razavi Khorasan
- County: Khoshab
- District: Meshkan
- Rural District: Yam

Population (2016)
  - Total: 160
- Time zone: UTC+3:30 (IRST)

Dargahabad (Persian: درگاه اباد) (Note: Also romanized as Dargāhābād) is a village in Yam Rural District of Meshkan District in Khoshab County, Razavi Khorasan province, Iran.

== Demographics ==
=== Population ===
At the time of the 2006 National Census, the village's population was 242 in 59 households, when it was in Darreh Yam Rural District (Note: Renamed Meshkan Rural District) of the former Khoshab District in Sabzevar County. The following census in 2011 counted 215 people in 58 households, by which time the district had been separated from the county in the establishment of Khoshab County. The rural district was transferred to the new Meshkan District and renamed Meshkan Rural District. Dargahabad was transferred to Yam Rural District created in the same district. The 2016 census measured the population of the village as 160 people in 58 households.
