= Now Deh-e Anqolab Rural District =

Rural district in Razavi Khorasan Province, Iran

Now Deh-e Anqolab Rural District Persian: دهستان نوده انقلاب
- Rural District
- Location within Iran
- Coordinates: 36°29′N 57°41′E
- Country: Iran
- Province: Razavi Khorasan
- County: Khoshab
- District: Now Deh-e Anqolab
- Established: 2019
- Capital: Cheru
- Time zone: UTC+3:30 (IRST)

Now Deh-e Anqolab Rural District (Persian: دهستان نوده انقلاب) is in Now Deh-e Anqolab District of Khoshab County, Razavi Khorasan province, Iran. Its capital is the village of Cheru, whose population at the time of the 2016 National Census was 532 in 180 households.

== History ==
In 2010, Khoshab District was separated from Sabzevar County in the establishment of Khoshab County, which was divided into two districts of two rural districts each, with Soltanabad as its capital and only city at the time. In 2019, Tabas Rural District was separated from the Central District in the formation of Now Deh-e Anqolab District, and Now Deh-e Anqolab Rural District was created in the new district.

== Other villages in the rural district ==
- Hasanabad
- Jannatabad
- Nasrabad
- Qarzi
- Yahyaabad
