= Kalateh-ye Hajji Motalleb =

Village in Razavi Khorasan province, Iran

Kalateh-ye Hajji Motalleb Persian: كلاته حاجي مطلب
- Village
- Location within Iran
- Coordinates: 36°27′12″N 57°45′39″E
- Country: Iran
- Province: Razavi Khorasan
- County: Khoshab
- District: Now Deh-e Anqolab
- Rural District: Tabas

Population (2016)
  - Total: 13
- Time zone: UTC+3:30 (IRST)

Kalateh-ye Hajji Motalleb (Persian: كلاته حاجي مطلب) (Note: Also romanized as Kalāteh-ye Ḩājjī Moţalleb) is a village in Tabas Rural District of Now Deh-e Anqolab District in Khoshab County, Razavi Khorasan province, Iran.

== Demographics ==
=== Population ===
At the time of the 2006 National Census, the village's population was 28 in 11 households, when it was in the former Khoshab District of Sabzevar County. The following census in 2011 counted 14 people in eight households, by which time the district had been separated from the county in the establishment of Khoshab County. The rural district was transferred to the new Central District. The 2016 census measured the population of the village as 13 people in eight households.

In 2019, the rural district was separated from the district in the formation of Now Deh-e Anqolab District.
