= Shir Khan, Razavi Khorasan =

Village in Razavi Khorasan province, Iran

Shir Khan Persian: شيرخان
- Village
- Location within Iran
- Coordinates: 36°26′53″N 57°49′25″E
- Country: Iran
- Province: Razavi Khorasan
- County: Khoshab
- District: Now Deh-e Anqolab
- Rural District: Tabas

Population (2016)
  - Total: 708
- Time zone: UTC+3:30 (IRST)

Shir Khan (Persian: شيرخان) (Note: Also romanized as Shīr Khān) is a village in Tabas Rural District of Now Deh-e Anqolab District in Khoshab County, Razavi Khorasan province, Iran.

== Demographics ==
=== Population ===
At the time of the 2006 National Census, the village's population was 845 in 212 households, when it was in the former Khoshab District of Sabzevar County. The following census in 2011 counted 848 people in 229 households, by which time the district had been separated from the county in the establishment of Khoshab County. The rural district was transferred to the new Central District. The 2016 census measured the population of the village as 708 people in 212 households.

In 2019, the rural district was separated from the district in the formation of Now Deh-e Anqolab District.
