= Dashkhaneh =

Dashkhaneh or Dash Khaneh (Persian: داشخانه) may refer to:

- Dashkhaneh, Soltanabad, Razavi Khorasan Province
- Dashkhaneh, Tabas, Razavi Khorasan Province
- Dash Khaneh, Mashhad, Razavi Khorasan Province
- Dash Khaneh, West Azerbaijan
