= Sorkh =

Village in Razavi Khorasan province, Iran

Sorkh Persian: سرخ
- Village
- Location within Iran
- Coordinates: 36°41′23″N 58°06′44″E
- Country: Iran
- Province: Razavi Khorasan
- County: Khoshab
- District: Meshkan
- Rural District: Yam

Population (2016)
  - Total: 120
- Time zone: UTC+3:30 (IRST)

Sorkh (Persian: سرخ) is a village in Yam Rural District of Meshkan District in Khoshab County, Razavi Khorasan province, Iran.

== Demographics ==
=== Population ===
At the time of the 2006 National Census, the village's population was 130 in 37 households, when it was in Darreh Yam Rural District (Note: Renamed Meshkan Rural District) of the former Khoshab District in Sabzevar County. The following census in 2011 counted 85 people in 27 households, by which time the district had been separated from the county in the establishment of Khoshab County. The rural district was transferred to the new Meshkan District and renamed Meshkan Rural District. Sorkh was transferred to Yam Rural District created in the same district. The 2016 census measured the population of the village as 120 people in 44 households.
