= Nazarabad, Khoshab =

Village in Razavi Khorasan province, Iran

Nazarabad Persian: نظراباد
- Village
- Location within Iran
- Country: Iran
- Province: Razavi Khorasan
- County: Khoshab
- District: Meshkan
- Rural District: Yam

Population (2016)
  - Total: 90
- Time zone: UTC+3:30 (IRST)

Nazarabad (Persian: نظراباد) (Note: Also romanized as Naz̧arābād) is a village in Yam Rural District of Meshkan District in Khoshab County, Razavi Khorasan province, Iran.

== Demographics ==
=== Population ===
At the time of the 2006 National Census, the village's population was 197 in 38 households, when it was in Darreh Yam Rural District (Note: Renamed Meshkan Rural District) of the former Khoshab District in Sabzevar County. The following census in 2011 counted 125 people in 32 households, by which time the district had been separated from the county in the establishment of Khoshab County. The rural district was transferred to the new Meshkan District and renamed Meshkan Rural District. Nazarabad was transferred to Yam Rural District created in the same district. The 2016 census measured the population of the village as 90 people in 25 households.
