= Kuh Darreh =

Village in Razavi Khorasan province, Iran

Kuh Darreh Persian: كوه دره
- Village
- Location within Iran
- Coordinates: 36°45′56″N 58°11′29″E
- Country: Iran
- Province: Razavi Khorasan
- County: Khoshab
- District: Meshkan
- Rural District: Yam

Population (2016)
  - Total: 212
- Time zone: UTC+3:30 (IRST)

Kuh Darreh (Persian: كوه دره) (Note: Also romanized as Kūh Darreh) is a village in Yam Rural District of Meshkan District in Khoshab County, Razavi Khorasan province, Iran.

== Demographics ==
=== Population ===
At the time of the 2006 National Census, the village's population was 230 in 61 households, when it was in Darreh Yam Rural District (Note: Renamed Meshkan Rural District) of the former Khoshab District in Sabzevar County. The following census in 2011 counted 172 people in 50 households, by which time the district had been separated from the county in the establishment of Khoshab County. The rural district was transferred to the new Meshkan District and renamed Meshkan Rural District. Kuh Darreh was transferred to Yam Rural District created in the same district. The 2016 census measured the population of the village as 212 people in 71 households.
