= Yam =

Yam or YAM may refer to:

== Plants and foods ==
- Yam (vegetable), common name for members of Dioscorea
- Sweet potato, known as yam in parts of North America
- Taro, known in some countries as yam
- Oxalis tuberosa, known as yam in New Zealand
- Yam, spicy salads in Thai cuisine

== Places ==
- Yam (Nubia), 23rd century BC kingdom in Upper Nubia
- Yam, or Piyam, East Azerbaijan, Iran
- Yam, North Khorasan, Iran
- Yam, Razavi Khorasan, Iran
  - Yam Rural District
- Yam, Tehran, Iran
- Yam, Alexandrovsky District, Vladimir Oblast, Russia
- Yam fortress, in Leningrad Oblast, Russia
- Yam Island, Queensland, Australia

== People ==
- Ren (surname), sometimes romanised as Yam in Cantonese, including a list of people with the name
- Marylou Yam (born c. 1958), American nurse, academic administrator, and researcher
- Lindile Yam (born 1960), former chief of the South African Army
- Yam Madar (born 2000), Israeli basketball player
- Yam Wolczak (born 2003), Israeli judoka
- Yam, a son of Noah

== Other uses ==
- Yam (god), a Levantine deity
- Yam (route), a Mongol message delivery service
- Yam languages, a family of Papuan languages
- YAM (software), an e-mail client
- Yamnaya culture (Yam), an archaeological culture
- Yellowstone Art Museum, in Billings, Montana, United States
- Yunarmiya (YAM), or Young Army Cadets National Movement, a Russian military youth organisation
- Yam, Russian term for Tavastians
- Sault Ste. Marie Airport, Canada, IATA airport code YAM

== See also ==
- Yam yam (disambiguation)
- Yama (disambiguation)
- Yamm (disambiguation)
- Amorphophallus paeoniifolius, a plant known as elephant foot yam
- Amorphophallus konjac, a plant known as elephant foot yam
- Banu Yam, an Arabian tribe
