= Nowruzi, Khoshab =

Village in Razavi Khorasan province, Iran

Nowruzi Persian: نوروزي
- Village
- Location within Iran
- Coordinates: 36°44′47″N 58°07′02″E
- Country: Iran
- Province: Razavi Khorasan
- County: Khoshab
- District: Meshkan
- Rural District: Yam

Population (2016)
  - Total: 521
- Time zone: UTC+3:30 (IRST)

Nowruzi (Persian: نوروزي) (Note: Also romanized as Nowrūzī) is a village in Yam Rural District of Meshkan District in Khoshab County, Razavi Khorasan province, Iran.

== Demographics ==
=== Population ===
At the time of the 2006 National Census, the village's population was 729 in 202 households, when it was in Darreh Yam Rural District (Note: Renamed Meshkan Rural District) of the former Khoshab District in Sabzevar County. The following census in 2011 counted 674 people in 201 households, by which time the district had been separated from the county in the establishment of Khoshab County. The rural district was transferred to the new Meshkan District and renamed Meshkan Rural District. Nowruzi was transferred to Yam Rural District created in the same district. The 2016 census measured the population of the village as 521 people in 196 households.
