= Baba Langar =

Village in Razavi Khorasan province, Iran

Baba Langar Persian: بابا لنگر
- Village
- Location within Iran
- Coordinates: 36°41′45″N 58°07′28″E
- Country: Iran
- Province: Razavi Khorasan
- County: Khoshab
- District: Meshkan
- Rural District: Yam

Population (2016)
  - Total: 103
- Time zone: UTC+3:30 (IRST)

Baba Langar (Persian: بابا لنگر) (Note: Also romanized as Bābā Langar; also known as Bābā Langow (بابالنگو) and Langar) is a village in Yam Rural District of Meshkan District in Khoshab County, Razavi Khorasan province, Iran.

== Demographics ==
=== Population ===
At the time of the 2006 National Census, the village's population was 109 in 28 households, when it was in Darreh Yam Rural District (Note: Renamed Meshkan Rural District) of the former Khoshab District in Sabzevar County. The following census in 2011 counted 92 people in 26 households, by which time the district had been separated from the county in the establishment of Khoshab County. The rural district was transferred to the new Meshkan District and renamed Meshkan Rural District. Baba Langar was transferred to Yam Rural District created in the same district. The 2016 census measured the population of the village as 103 people in 30 households.
