= Dahaneh-ye Shur =

Village in Razavi Khorasan province, Iran

Dahaneh-ye Shur Persian: دهنه شور
- Village
- Location within Iran
- Coordinates: 36°34′35″N 58°04′24″E
- Country: Iran
- Province: Razavi Khorasan
- County: Khoshab
- District: Meshkan
- Rural District: Yam

Population (2016)
  - Total: 753
- Time zone: UTC+3:30 (IRST)

Dahaneh-ye Shur (Persian: دهنه شور) (Note: Also romanized as Dahaneh-ye Shūr) is a village in Yam Rural District of Meshkan District in Khoshab County, Razavi Khorasan province, Iran.

== Demographics ==
=== Population ===
At the time of the 2006 National Census, the village's population was 684 in 155 households, when it was in Darreh Yam Rural District (Note: Renamed Meshkan Rural District) of the former Khoshab District in Sabzevar County. The following census in 2011 counted 696 people in 192 households, by which time the district had been separated from the county in the establishment of Khoshab County. The rural district was transferred to the new Meshkan District and renamed Meshkan Rural District. Dahaneh-ye Shur was transferred to Yam Rural District created in the same district. The 2016 census measured the population of the village as 753 people in 212 households. It was the most populous village in its rural district.
