= Shamabad, Razavi Khorasan =

Village in Razavi Khorasan province, Iran

Shamabad Persian: شم اباد
- Village
- Location within Iran
- Coordinates: 36°27′00″N 57°47′47″E
- Country: Iran
- Province: Razavi Khorasan
- County: Khoshab
- District: Now Deh-e Anqolab
- Rural District: Tabas

Population (2016)
  - Total: 523
- Time zone: UTC+3:30 (IRST)

Shamabad (Persian: شم اباد) (Note: Also romanized as Shamābād and Shemābād; also known as Shamsābād) is a village in, and the capital of, Tabas Rural District in Now Deh-e Anqolab District of Khoshab County, Razavi Khorasan province, Iran.

== Demographics ==
=== Population ===
At the time of the 2006 National Census, the village's population was 572 in 165 households, when it was in the former Khoshab District of Sabzevar County. The following census in 2011 counted 836 people in 194 households, by which time the district had been separated from the county in the establishment of Khoshab County. The rural district was transferred to the new Central District. The 2016 census measured the population of the village as 523 people in 155 households.

In 2019, the rural district was separated from the district in the formation of Now Deh-e Anqolab District.
