= Chahak, Khoshab =

Village in Razavi Khorasan province, Iran

Chahak Persian: چاهك
- Village
- Location within Iran
- Coordinates: 36°24′15″N 57°49′44″E
- Country: Iran
- Province: Razavi Khorasan
- County: Khoshab
- District: Now Deh-e Anqolab
- Rural District: Tabas

Population (2016)
  - Total: 278
- Time zone: UTC+3:30 (IRST)

Chahak (Persian: چاهك) (Note: Also romanized as Chāhak) is a village in Tabas Rural District of Now Deh-e Anqolab District in Khoshab County, Razavi Khorasan province, Iran.

== Demographics ==
=== Population ===
At the time of the 2006 National Census, the village's population was 347 in 107 households, when it was in the former Khoshab District of Sabzevar County. The following census in 2011 counted 384 people in 135 households, by which time the district had been separated from the county in the establishment of Khoshab County. The rural district was transferred to the new Central District. The 2016 census measured the population of the village as 278 people in 111 households.

In 2019, the rural district was separated from the district in the formation of Now Deh-e Anqolab District.
