= Divangah =

Village in Razavi Khorasan province, Iran

Divangah Persian: ديوانگاه
- Village
- Location within Iran
- Coordinates: 36°41′48″N 58°12′22″E
- Country: Iran
- Province: Razavi Khorasan
- County: Khoshab
- District: Meshkan
- Rural District: Yam

Population (2016)
  - Total: 291
- Time zone: UTC+3:30 (IRST)

Divangah (Persian: ديوانگاه) (Note: Also romanized as Dīvāngāh) is a village in Yam Rural District of Meshkan District in Khoshab County, Razavi Khorasan province, Iran.

== Demographics ==
=== Population ===
At the time of the 2006 National Census, the village's population was 226 in 74 households, when it was in Darreh Yam Rural District (Note: Renamed Meshkan Rural District) of the former Khoshab District in Sabzevar County. The following census in 2011 counted 225 people in 75 households, by which time the district had been separated from the county in the establishment of Khoshab County. The rural district was transferred to the new Meshkan District and renamed Meshkan Rural District. Divangah was transferred to Yam Rural District created in the same district. The 2016 census measured the population of the village as 291 people in 116 households.
