= Darab, Razavi Khorasan =

Village in Razavi Khorasan province, Iran

Darab Persian: داراب
- Village
- Location within Iran
- Coordinates: 36°48′33″N 58°08′39″E
- Country: Iran
- Province: Razavi Khorasan
- County: Khoshab
- District: Meshkan
- Rural District: Yam

Population (2016)
  - Total: 453
- Time zone: UTC+3:30 (IRST)

Darab (Persian: داراب) (Note: Also romanized as Dārāb) is a village in Yam Rural District of Meshkan District in Khoshab County, Razavi Khorasan province, Iran.

== Demographics ==
=== Population ===
At the time of the 2006 National Census, the village's population was 531 in 154 households, when it was in Darreh Yam Rural District (Note: Renamed Meshkan Rural District) of the former Khoshab District in Sabzevar County. The following census in 2011 counted 677 people in 165 households, by which time the district had been separated from the county in the establishment of Khoshab County. The rural district was transferred to the new Meshkan District and renamed Meshkan Rural District. Darab was transferred to Yam Rural District created in the same district. The 2016 census measured the population of the village as 453 people in 161 households.
