= Yam, Razavi Khorasan =

Village in Razavi Khorasan province, Iran

Yam Persian: يام
- Village
- Location within Iran
- Coordinates: 36°39′40″N 58°11′25″E
- Country: Iran
- Province: Razavi Khorasan
- County: Khoshab
- District: Meshkan
- Rural District: Yam

Population (2016)
  - Total: 286
- Time zone: UTC+3:30 (IRST)

Yam (Persian: يام) (Note: Also romanized as Yām) is a village in, and the capital of, Yam Rural District in Meshkan District of Khoshab County, Razavi Khorasan province, Iran.

== Demographics ==
=== Population ===
At the time of the 2006 National Census, the village's population was 442 in 119 households, when it was in Darreh Yam Rural District (Note: Renamed Meshkan Rural District) of the former Khoshab District in Sabzevar County. The following census in 2011 counted 383 people in 114 households, by which time the district had been separated from the county in the establishment of Khoshab County. The rural district was transferred to the new Meshkan District and renamed Meshkan Rural District. Yam was transferred to Yam Rural District created in the same district. The 2016 census measured the population of the village as 286 people in 94 households.
