= Talebi, Khoshab =

Village in Razavi Khorasan province, Iran

Talebi Persian: طالبي
- Village
- Location within Iran
- Coordinates: 36°17′15″N 58°10′04″E
- Country: Iran
- Province: Razavi Khorasan
- County: Khoshab
- District: Central
- Rural District: Soltanabad

Population (2016)
  - Total: 223
- Time zone: UTC+3:30 (IRST)

Talebi (Persian: طالبي) (Note: Also romanized as Ţālebī) is a village in Soltanabad Rural District of the Central District in Khoshab County, Razavi Khorasan province, Iran.

== Demographics ==
=== Population ===
At the time of the 2006 National Census, the village's population was 259 in 75 households, when it was in the former Khoshab District of Sabzevar County. The following census in 2011 counted 258 people in 75 households, by which time the district had been separated from the county in the establishment of Khoshab County. The rural district was transferred to the new Central District. The 2016 census measured the population of the village as 223 people in 75 households.
