= Yang, Iran =

Village in Razavi Khorasan province, Iran

Yang Persian: ينگ
- Village
- Location within Iran
- Coordinates: 36°31′38″N 58°12′58″E
- Country: Iran
- Province: Razavi Khorasan
- County: Khoshab
- District: Meshkan
- Rural District: Meshkan

Population (2016)
  - Total: 318
- Time zone: UTC+3:30 (IRST)

Yang (Persian: ينگ) is a village in Meshkan Rural District (Note: Formerly Darreh Yam Rural District) of Meshkan District in Khoshab County, Razavi Khorasan province, Iran.

== Demographics ==
=== Population ===
At the time of the 2006 National Census, the village's population was 352 in 99 households, when it was in Darreh Yam Rural District (Note: Renamed Meshkan Rural District) of the former Khoshab District in Sabzevar County. The following census in 2011 counted 328 people in 82 households, by which time the rural district had been separated from the county in the establishment of Khoshab County. The rural district was transferred to the new Meshkan District and renamed Meshkan Rural District. The 2016 census measured the population of the village as 318 people in 101 households.
