= Zarqi =

Village in Razavi Khorasan province, Iran

Zarqi Persian: زرقي
- Village
- Location within Iran
- Coordinates: 36°17′37″N 58°06′58″E
- Country: Iran
- Province: Razavi Khorasan
- County: Khoshab
- District: Central
- Rural District: Soltanabad

Population (2016)
  - Total: 136
- Time zone: UTC+3:30 (IRST)

Zarqi (Persian: زرقي) (Note: Also romanized as Zarqī) is a village in Soltanabad Rural District of the Central District in Khoshab County, Razavi Khorasan province, Iran.

== Demographics ==
=== Population ===
At the time of the 2006 National Census, the village's population was 214 in 43 households, when it was in the former Khoshab District of Sabzevar County. The following census in 2011 counted 202 people in 50 households, by which time the district had been separated from the county in the establishment of Khoshab County. The rural district was transferred to the new Central District. The 2016 census measured the population of the village as 136 people in 45 households.
