= Dorofk-e Sofla =

Village in Razavi Khorasan province, Iran

Dorofk-e Sofla Persian: درفک سفلی
- Village
- Location within Iran
- Coordinates: 36°23′58″N 57°46′11″E
- Country: Iran
- Province: Razavi Khorasan
- County: Khoshab
- District: Now Deh-e Anqolab
- Rural District: Tabas

Population (2016)
  - Total: 0
- Time zone: UTC+3:30 (IRST)

Dorofk-e Sofla (Persian: درفک سفلی) (Note: Also romanized as Dorofk-e Soflá; also known as Dorofk and Dorofk-e Pā’īn) is a village in Tabas Rural District of Now Deh-e Anqolab District in Khoshab County, Razavi Khorasan province, Iran.

== Demographics ==
=== Population ===
At the time of the 2006 National Census, the village's population was 237 in 85 households, when it was in the former Khoshab District of Sabzevar County. The following census in 2011 counted 223 people in 86 households, by which time the district had been separated from the county in the establishment of Khoshab County. The rural district was transferred to the new Central District. The 2016 census measured the population of the village as zero.

In 2019, the rural district was separated from the district in the formation of Now Deh-e Anqolab District.
