= Deh Now, Khoshab =

Village in Razavi Khorasan province, Iran

Deh Now Persian: دهنو
- Village
- Location within Iran
- Coordinates: 36°33′08″N 58°12′58″E
- Country: Iran
- Province: Razavi Khorasan
- County: Khoshab
- District: Meshkan
- Rural District: Meshkan

Population (2016)
  - Total: 84
- Time zone: UTC+3:30 (IRST)

Deh Now (Persian: دهنو) (Note: Also known as Deh-i-Nau) is a village in Meshkan Rural District (Note: Formerly Darreh Yam Rural District) of Meshkan District in Khoshab County, Razavi Khorasan province, Iran.

== Demographics ==
=== Population ===
At the time of the 2006 National Census, the village's population was 148 in 34 households, when it was in Darreh Yam Rural District (Note: Renamed Meshkan Rural District) of the former Khoshab District in Sabzevar County. The following census in 2011 counted 100 people in 33 households, by which time the rural district had been separated from the county in the establishment of Khoshab County. The rural district was transferred to the new Meshkan District and renamed Meshkan Rural District. The 2016 census measured the population of the village as 84 people in 34 households.
