= Abdollahabad, Khoshab =

Village in Razavi Khorasan province, Iran

Abdollahabad Persian: عبداله اباد
- Village
- Location within Iran
- Coordinates: 36°31′22″N 57°56′41″E
- Country: Iran
- Province: Razavi Khorasan
- County: Khoshab
- District: Central
- Rural District: Robat-e Jaz

Population (2016)
  - Total: 140
- Time zone: UTC+3:30 (IRST)

Abdollahabad (Persian: عبداله اباد) (Note: Also romanized as ‘Abdollahābād; also known as ‘Abdolābād) is a village in Robat-e Jaz Rural District of the Central District in Khoshab County, Razavi Khorasan province, Iran.

== Demographics ==
=== Population ===
At the time of the 2006 National Census, the village's population was 175 in 40 households, when it was in the former Khoshab District of Sabzevar County. The following census in 2011 counted 161 people in 41 households, by which time the district had been separated from the county in the establishment of Khoshab County. The rural district was transferred to the new Central District. The 2016 census measured the population of the village as 140 people in 39 households.
