= Seyyedabad, Khoshab =

Village in Razavi Khorasan province, Iran

Seyyedabad Persian: سيداباد
- Village
- Location within Iran
- Coordinates: 36°23′07″N 58°07′35″E
- Country: Iran
- Province: Razavi Khorasan
- County: Khoshab
- District: Central
- Rural District: Soltanabad

Population (2016)
  - Total: 436
- Time zone: UTC+3:30 (IRST)

Seyyedabad (Persian: سيداباد) (Note: Also romanized as Seyyedābād; also known as Sa‘īdābād) is a village in Soltanabad Rural District of the Central District in Khoshab County, Razavi Khorasan province, Iran.

== Demographics ==
=== Population ===
At the time of the 2006 National Census, the village's population was 1,463 in 390 households, when it was in the former Khoshab District of Sabzevar County. The following census in 2011 counted 1,376 people in 406 households, by which time the district had been separated from the county in the establishment of Khoshab County. The rural district was transferred to the new Central District. The 2016 census measured the population of the village as 1,456 people in 436 households.
