= Gol Gonbad =

Village in Razavi Khorasan province, Iran

Gol Gonbad Persian: گل گنبد
- Village
- Location within Iran
- Coordinates: 36°38′20″N 58°10′01″E
- Country: Iran
- Province: Razavi Khorasan
- County: Khoshab
- District: Meshkan
- Rural District: Meshkan

Population (2016)
  - Total: 236
- Time zone: UTC+3:30 (IRST)

Gol Gonbad (Persian: گل گنبد) (Note: Also known as Kombī) is a village in Meshkan Rural District (Note: Formerly Darreh Yam Rural District) of Meshkan District in Khoshab County, Razavi Khorasan province, Iran.

== Demographics ==
=== Population ===
At the time of the 2006 National Census, the village's population was 276 in 74 households, when it was in Darreh Yam Rural District (Note: Renamed Meshkan Rural District) of the former Khoshab District in Sabzevar County. The following census in 2011 counted 276 people in 77 households, by which time the rural district had been separated from the county in the establishment of Khoshab County. The rural district was transferred to the new Meshkan District and renamed Meshkan Rural District. The 2016 census measured the population of the village as 236 people in 70 households.
