= Robat-e Jaz =

Village in Razavi Khorasan province, Iran

Robat-e Jaz Persian: رباط جز
- Village
- Location within Iran
- Coordinates: 36°27′24″N 58°00′05″E
- Country: Iran
- Province: Razavi Khorasan
- County: Khoshab
- District: Central
- Rural District: Robat-e Jaz

Population (2016)
  - Total: 3,037
- Time zone: UTC+3:30 (IRST)

Robat-e Jaz (Persian: رباط جز) (Note: Also romanized as Robāt Jaz, Robāţ-e Jaz, and Robātjaz; also known as Rabāş Jaz, Ribāt-i-Gaz, and Robāţ-e Gāz) is a village in, and the capital of, Robat-e Jaz Rural District in the Central District of Khoshab County, Razavi Khorasan province, Iran.

== Demographics ==
=== Population ===
At the time of the 2006 National Census, the village's population was 2,951 in 821 households, when it was in the former Khoshab District of Sabzevar County. The following census in 2011 counted 3,003 people in 935 households, by which time the district had been separated from the county in the establishment of Khoshab County. The rural district was transferred to the new Central District. The 2016 census measured the population of the village as 3,037 people in 1,000 households, the most populous in its rural district.
