= Hojjatabad, Khoshab =

Village in Razavi Khorasan province, Iran

Hojjatabad Persian: حجت اباد
- Village
- Location within Iran
- Coordinates: 36°29′55″N 57°55′04″E
- Country: Iran
- Province: Razavi Khorasan
- County: Khoshab
- District: Central
- Rural District: Robat-e Jaz

Population (2016)
  - Total: 117
- Time zone: UTC+3:30 (IRST)

Hojjatabad (Persian: حجت‌آباد) (Note: Also romanized as Ḩojjatābād; also known as Kalāteh-ye Shūr) is a village in Robat-e Jaz Rural District of the Central District in Khoshab County, Razavi Khorasan province, Iran.

== Demographics ==
=== Population ===
At the time of the 2006 National Census, the village's population was 95 in 25 households, when it was in the former Khoshab District of Sabzevar County. The following census in 2011 counted 78 people in 22 households, by which time the district had been separated from the county in the establishment of Khoshab County. The rural district was transferred to the new Central District. The 2016 census measured the population of the village as 117 people in 35 households.
