= Tabas, Razavi Khorasan =

Village in Razavi Khorasan province, Iran

Tabas Persian: طبس
- Village
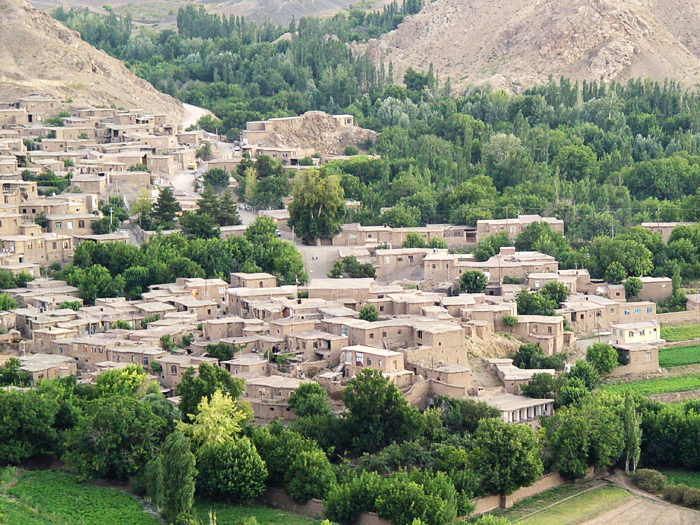
- The village of Tabas

- Location within Iran
- Coordinates: 36°24′18″N 57°42′31″E
- Country: Iran
- Province: Razavi Khorasan
- County: Khoshab
- District: Now Deh-e Anqolab
- Rural District: Tabas

Population (2016)
  - Total: 490
- Time zone: UTC+3:30 (IRST)

Tabas (Persian: طبس) (Note: Also romanized as Ţabas; also known as Katal Ţabas) is a village in Tabas Rural District of Now Deh-e Anqolab District in Khoshab County, Razavi Khorasan province, Iran.

== Demographics ==
=== Population ===
At the time of the 2006 National Census, the village's population was 793 in 261 households, when it was in the former Khoshab District of Sabzevar County. The following census in 2011 counted 642 people in 228 households, by which time the district had been separated from the county in the establishment of Khoshab County. The rural district was transferred to the new Central District. The 2016 census measured the population of the village as 490 people in 185 households.

In 2019, the rural district was separated from the district in the formation of Now Deh-e Anqolab District.
