= Bolqanabad =

Village in Razavi Khorasan province, Iran

Bolqanabad Persian: بلقان اباد
- Village
- Location within Iran
- Coordinates: 36°22′22″N 58°10′04″E
- Country: Iran
- Province: Razavi Khorasan
- County: Khoshab
- District: Central
- Rural District: Soltanabad

Population (2016)
  - Total: 1,705
- Time zone: UTC+3:30 (IRST)

Bolqanabad (Persian: بلقان اباد) (Note: Also romanized as Bolqānābād) is a village in Soltanabad Rural District of the Central District in Khoshab County, Razavi Khorasan province, Iran.

== Demographics ==
=== Population ===
At the time of the 2006 National Census, the village's population was 1,578 in 373 households, when it was in the former Khoshab District of Sabzevar County. The following census in 2011 counted 1,697 people in 470 households, by which time the district had been separated from the county in the establishment of Khoshab County. The rural district was transferred to the new Central District. The 2016 census measured the population of the village as 1,705 people in 515 household, the most populous in its rural district.
