= Chezg =

Village in Razavi Khorasan province, Iran

Chezg Persian: چزگ
- Village
- Location within Iran
- Coordinates: 36°21′18″N 58°13′05″E
- Country: Iran
- Province: Razavi Khorasan
- County: Khoshab
- District: Central
- Rural District: Soltanabad

Population (2016)
  - Total: 553
- Time zone: UTC+3:30 (IRST)

Chezg (Persian: چزگ) is a village in Soltanabad Rural District of the Central District in Khoshab County, Razavi Khorasan province, Iran.

== Demographics ==
=== Population ===
At the time of the 2006 National Census, the village's population was 662 in 164 households, when it was in Taghenkuh-e Shomali Rural District of Taghenkuh District in Firuzeh County. The following census in 2011 counted 601 people in 173 households, by which time the village had been separated from the county in the establishment of Khoshab County. Chezg was transferred to Soltanabad Rural District in the new Central District. The 2016 census measured the population of the village as 553 people in 189 households.
