= Tabas (disambiguation) =

Tabas is a city in South Khorasan Province, Iran.

Tabas (Persian: طبس) may also refer to:

- Tabas, Razavi Khorasan, a village in Razavi Khorasan province
- Tabas-e Masina, a city in Darmian County, South Khorasan province
- Tabas-e Masina Rural District, Darmian County, South Khorasan province
- Tabas County, in South Khorasan province
- Tabas Rural District, in Razavi Khorasan province
