= Dorofk =

Dorofk (Persian: درفک) may refer to:

- Dorofk-e Olya
- Dorofk-e Sofla
