= Jambarjuq =

Village in Razavi Khorasan province, Iran

Jambarjuq Persian: جمبرجوق
- Village
- Location within Iran
- Coordinates: 36°28′45″N 58°12′01″E
- Country: Iran
- Province: Razavi Khorasan
- County: Khoshab
- District: Meshkan
- Rural District: Meshkan

Population (2016)
  - Total: 747
- Time zone: UTC+3:30 (IRST)

Jambarjuq (Persian: جمبرجوق) (Note: Also romanized as Jambarjūq; also known as Jām Barjūy, Jambarju, Jambarjūg, Jambaz Jūq, Jamīz Jaraq, and Janbarjūq) is a village in Meshkan Rural District (Note: Formerly Darreh Yam Rural District) of Meshkan District in Khoshab County, Razavi Khorasan province, Iran.

== Demographics ==
=== Population ===
At the time of the 2006 National Census, the village's population was 770 in 176 households, when it was in Taghenkuh-e Shomali Rural District of Taghenkuh District in Firuzeh County. The following census in 2011 counted 768 people in 215 households, by which time Jambarjuq had been separated from the county in the establishment of Khoshab County. The village was transferred to Meshkan Rural District in the new Meshkan District. The 2016 census measured the population of the village as 747 people in 229 households.
