= Sarajeh, Razavi Khorasan =

Village in Razavi Khorasan province, Iran

Sarajeh Persian: سراجه
- Village
- Location within Iran
- Coordinates: 36°19′30″N 58°03′00″E
- Country: Iran
- Province: Razavi Khorasan
- County: Khoshab
- District: Central
- Rural District: Soltanabad

Population (2016)
  - Total: 78
- Time zone: UTC+3:30 (IRST)

Sarajeh (Persian: سراجه) (Note: Also romanized as Sarājeh and Serājeh; also known as Sarāḩeh) is a village in Soltanabad Rural District of the Central District in Khoshab County, Razavi Khorasan province, Iran.

== Demographics ==
=== Population ===
At the time of the 2006 National Census, the village's population was 74 in 23 households, when it was in the former Khoshab District of Sabzevar County. The following census in 2011 counted 93 people in 30 households, by which time the district had been separated from the county in the establishment of Khoshab County. The rural district was transferred to the new Central District. The 2016 census measured the population of the village as 78 people in 27 households.
