= Robati Shahzadeh =

Village in Razavi Khorasan province, Iran

Robati Shahzadeh Persian: رباطي شاهزاده
- Village
- Location within Iran
- Coordinates: 36°26′59″N 58°13′27″E
- Country: Iran
- Province: Razavi Khorasan
- County: Khoshab
- District: Meshkan
- Rural District: Meshkan

Population (2016)
  - Total: 371
- Time zone: UTC+3:30 (IRST)

Robati Shahzadeh (Persian: رباطي شاهزاده) (Note: Also romanized as Robāţī Shāhzādeh) is a village in Meshkan Rural District (Note: Formerly Darreh Yam Rural District) of Meshkan District in Khoshab County, Razavi Khorasan province, Iran.

== Demographics ==
=== Population ===
At the time of the 2006 National Census, the village's population was 476 in 122 households, when it was in Taghenkuh-e Shomali Rural District of Taghenkuh District in Firuzeh County. The following census in 2011 counted 459 people in 127 households, by which time Jambarjuq had been separated from the county in the establishment of Khoshab County. The village was transferred to Meshkan Rural District in the new Meshkan District. The 2016 census measured the population of the village as 371 people in 111 households.
