= Farkhar, Iran =

Village in Razavi Khorasan province, Iran

Farkhar Persian: فرخار
- Village
- Location within Iran
- Coordinates: 36°22′06″N 58°11′38″E
- Country: Iran
- Province: Razavi Khorasan
- County: Khoshab
- District: Central
- Rural District: Soltanabad

Population (2016)
  - Total: 913
- Time zone: UTC+3:30 (IRST)

Farkhar (Persian: فرخار) (Note: Also romanized as Farkhār) is a village in Soltanabad Rural District of the Central District in Khoshab County, Razavi Khorasan province, Iran.

== Demographics ==
=== Population ===
At the time of the 2006 National Census, the village's population was 937 in 221 households, when it was in Taghenkuh-e Shomali Rural District of Taghenkuh District in Firuzeh County. The following census in 2011 counted 947 people in 272 households, by which time the village had been separated from the county in the establishment of Khoshab County. Farkhar was transferred to Soltanabad Rural District in the new Central District. The 2016 census measured the population of the village as 913 people in 268 households.
