= Now Deh-e Anqolab =

City in Razavi Khorasan province, Iran

Now Deh-e Anqolab Persian: نوده انقلاب
- City
- Location within Iran
- Coordinates: 36°27′54″N 57°38′24″E
- Country: Iran
- Province: Razavi Khorasan
- County: Khoshab
- District: Now Deh-e Anqolab
- Established as a city: 2020

Population (2016)
  - Total: 3,470
- Time zone: UTC+3:30 (IRST)

Now Deh-e Anqolab (Persian: نوده انقلاب) (Note: Also romanized as Now Deh-e Ānqolāb; also known as Naudeh, Now Deh, and Now Deh-e Arbab (نوده ارباب), also romanized as Now Deh-e Arbāb) is a city in, and the capital of, Now Deh-e Anqolab District in Khoshab County, Razavi Khorasan province, Iran.

== Demographics ==
=== Population ===
At the time of the 2006 National Census, Now Deh-e Anqolab's population was 3,896 in 1,012 households, when it was a village in Tabas Rural District of the former Khoshab District in Sabzevar County. The following census in 2011 counted 3,469 people in 1,050 households, by which time the district had been separated from the county in the establishment of Khoshab County. The rural district was transferred to the new Central District. The 2016 census measured the population of the village as 3,470 people in 1,149 households, the most populous in its rural district.

The rural district was separated from the district in the formation of Now Deh-e Anqolab District in 2019,
