= Dashkhaneh, Soltanabad =

Village in Razavi Khorasan province, Iran

Dashkhaneh Persian: داشخانه
- Village
- Location within Iran
- Coordinates: 36°18′09″N 58°07′44″E
- Country: Iran
- Province: Razavi Khorasan
- County: Khoshab
- District: Central
- Rural District: Soltanabad

Population (2016)
  - Total: 0
- Time zone: UTC+3:30 (IRST)

Dashkhaneh (Persian: داشخانه) (Note: Also romanized as Dāshkhāneh; also known as Dāshkhān Taḵāb (داشخان تكاب)) is a village in Soltanabad Rural District of the Central District in Khoshab County, Razavi Khorasan province, Iran.

== Demographics ==
=== Population ===
At the time of the 2006 National Census, the village's population was 22 in nine households, when it was in the former Khoshab District of Sabzevar County. The following census in 2011 counted 16 people in four households, by which time the district had been separated from the county in the establishment of Khoshab County. The rural district was transferred to the new Central District. The 2016 census measured the population of the village as zero.
