= Kashk (disambiguation) =

Kashk is a food.

Kashk or Keshk (Persian: كشك) may also refer to:

- Kashk, East Azerbaijan, a village in East Azerbaijan Province, Iran
- Kashk, Khoshab, a village in Khoshab County, Razavi Khorasan Province, Iran
