= Sarajeh =

Sarajeh or Serajeh (Persian: سراجه) may refer to:

- Sarajeh, Qom
- Sarajeh, Razavi Khorasan
