= Meshkan, Razavi Khorasan =

City in Razavi Khorasan province, Iran

Meshkan Persian: مشكان
- City
- Location within Iran
- Coordinates: 36°32′01″N 58°08′44″E
- Country: Iran
- Province: Razavi Khorasan
- County: Khoshab
- District: Meshkan
- Established: 2017

Population (2016)
  - Total: 3,540
- Time zone: UTC+3:30 (IRST)

Meshkan (Persian: مشكان) (Note: Also romanized as Mashkān and Meshkān; also known as Mashgan) is a city in, and the capital of, Meshkan District in Khoshab County, Razavi Khorasan province, Iran. It also serves as the administrative center for Meshkan Rural District. (Note: Formerly Darrehyam Rural District)

== Demographics ==
=== Population ===
At the time of the 2006 National Census, Meshkan's population was 4,004 in 929 households, when it was a village in Darrehyam Rural District (Note: Renamed Meshkan Rural District) of the former Khoshab District of Sabzevar County. The following census in 2011 counted 4,331 people in 1,116 households, by which time the district had been separated from the county in the establishment of Khoshab County. The rural district was transferred to the new Meshkan District as Meshkan Rural District. The 2016 census measured the population of the village as 3,540 people in 1,012 households. It was the most populous village in its rural district.

Meshkan was converted to a city in 2017.
