= Soltanabad Rural District =

Soltanabad Rural District (Persian: دهستان سلطان‌آباد) may refer to:

- Soltanabad Rural District (Khuzestan Province)
- Soltanabad Rural District (Razavi Khorasan Province)
