= Robat-e Jaz Rural District =

Rural district in Razavi Khorasan province, Iran

Robat-e Jaz Rural District Persian: دهستان رباط جز
- Rural District
- Location within Iran
- Coordinates: 36°31′N 57°58′E
- Country: Iran
- Province: Razavi Khorasan
- County: Khoshab
- District: Central
- Established: 1993
- Capital: Robat-e Jaz

Population (2016)
  - Total: 3,294
- Time zone: UTC+3:30 (IRST)

Robat-e Jaz Rural District (Persian: دهستان رباط جز) is in the Central District of Khoshab County, Razavi Khorasan province, Iran. Its capital is the village of Robat-e Jaz.

== Demographics ==
=== Population ===
At the time of the 2006 National Census, the rural district's population (as a part of the former Khoshab District in Sabzevar County) was 3,221 in 886 households. There were 3,242 inhabitants in 998 households at the following census of 2011, by which time the district had been separated from the county in the establishment of Khoshab County. The rural district was transferred to the new Central District. The 2016 census measured the population of the rural district as 3,294 in 1,074 households. The most populous of its four villages was Robat-e Jaz, with 3,037 people.

=== Other villages in the rural district ===
- Abdollahabad
- Hojjatabad
