= Yam Rural District =

Rural district in Razavi Khorasan province, Iran

Yam Rural District Persian: دهستان يام
- Rural District
- Location within Iran
- Coordinates: 36°42′N 58°08′E
- Country: Iran
- Province: Razavi Khorasan
- County: Khoshab
- District: Meshkan
- Established: 2010
- Capital: Yam

Population (2016)
  - Total: 4,679
- Time zone: UTC+3:30 (IRST)

Yam Rural District (Persian: دهستان يام) is in Meshkan District of Khoshab County, Razavi Khorasan province, Iran. Its capital is the village of Yam.

== History ==
In 2010, Khoshab District was separated from Sabzevar County in the establishment of Khoshab County, and Yam Rural District was created in the new Meshkan District.

== Demographics ==
=== Population ===
At the time of the 2011 National Census, the rural district's population was 5,491 in 1,602 households. The 2016 census measured the population of the rural district as 4,679 in 1,634 households. The most populous of its 37 villages was Dahaneh-ye Shur, with 753 people.

=== Other villages in the rural district ===
- Abbasabad
- Adelabad
- Ardanj
- Baba Langar
- Besk
- Darab
- Darband
- Dargahabad
- Divangah
- Ebrahimabad
- Hoseynabad
- Kahan
- Kahan-e Pain
- Kuh Darreh
- Kushk
- Malekabad
- Nashib
- Nazarabad
- Nowruzi
- Siman
- Sorkh
