= Yamm =

Yamm may refer to:

- Yamm (god), the Ugaritic sea and river god
- Yamm (rural locality), a village in Pskov Oblast, Russia

== See also ==
- Yam (disambiguation)
