= Dash Khaneh, West Azerbaijan =

Dash Khaneh داشخانه
- Village
- Location within Iran
- Coordinates: 37°01′03″N 45°41′30″E
- Country: Iran
- Province: West Azerbaijan
- County: Mahabad
- Bakhsh: Central
- Rural District: Mokriyan-e Gharbi

Population (2006)
  - Total: 350
- Time zone: UTC+3:30 (IRST)
  - Summer (DST): UTC+4:30 (IRDT)

Dash Khaneh (Persian: داشخانه, also Romanized as Dāsh Khāneh; also known as Dāshkhāneh) is a village in Mokriyan-e Gharbi Rural District, in the Central District of Mahabad County, West Azerbaijan Province, Iran. At the 2006 census, its population was 350, in 55 families.
