= Yam, Alexandrovsky District, Vladimir Oblast =

Yam Ям
- Village
- Location within Vladimir Oblast Location within Russia
- Coordinates: 56°38′N 38°27′E
- Country: Russia
- Region: Vladimir Oblast
- District: Alexandrovsky District
- Time zone: UTC+3:00

Yam (Russian: Ям) is a rural locality (a village) in Krasnoplamenskoye Rural Settlement, Alexandrovsky District, Vladimir Oblast, Russia. The population was 15 as of 2010. There is 1 street.

== Geography ==
The village is located 12 km north from Krasnoye Plamya, 37 km north-west from Alexandrov.
