= Dash Khaneh, Mashhad =

Dash Khaneh داشخانه
- Village
- Location within Iran
- Coordinates: 35°57′22″N 59°35′15″E
- Country: Iran
- Province: Razavi Khorasan
- County: Mashhad
- Bakhsh: Ahmadabad
- Rural District: Sarjam

Population (2006)
  - Total: 241
- Time zone: UTC+3:30 (IRST)
  - Summer (DST): UTC+4:30 (IRDT)

Dash Khaneh (Persian: داشخانه, also Romanized as Dāsh Khāneh) is a village in Sarjam Rural District, Ahmadabad District, Mashhad County, Razavi Khorasan Province, Iran. At the 2006 census, its population was 241, in 60 families.
