= Yam yam =

Yam yam, along with Yam Yam and other variations, may refer to:

- a speaker of the Black Country dialect of the UK
- Yamyam or Abdulkadir Hersi Siyad (1946–2005), Somali poet
- Yamyam Gucong (born 1993), Filipino actor and comedian
- Siu Yam-yam (born 1950), Chinese actress
- Yağmur Sarıgül (born 1979), nicknamed "Yamyam", member of the Turkish band Manga
- Yam Yam (album), 1995 album by the jazz musician Mark Turner
- Yamil "Yam Yam" Arocho, a reality TV personality who appeared on Survivor 44 and The Traitors US season 4
