= Soltanabad Rural District (Khoshab County) =

Rural district in Razavi Khorasan province, Iran

Soltanabad Rural District Persian: دهستان سلطان آباد
- Rural District
- Location within Iran
- Coordinates: 36°21′N 58°02′E
- Country: Iran
- Province: Razavi Khorasan
- County: Khoshab
- District: Central
- Established: 1987
- Capital: Soltanabad

Population (2016)
  - Total: 8,028
- Time zone: UTC+3:30 (IRST)

Soltanabad Rural District (Persian: دهستان سلطان آباد) is in the Central District of Khoshab County, Razavi Khorasan province, Iran. It is administered from the city of Soltanabad.

== Demographics ==
=== Population ===
At the time of the 2006 National Census, the rural district's population (as a part of the former Khoshab District in Sabzevar County) was 7,129 in 373 households. There were 7,503 inhabitants in 2,162 households at the following census of 2011, by which time the district had been separated from the county in the establishment of Khoshab County. The rural district was transferred to the new Central District. The 2016 census measured the population of the rural district as 8,028 in 2,492 households. The most populous of its 38 villages was Bolqanabad, with 1,705 people.

=== Other villages in the rural district ===
- Aliyak
- Chezg
- Dashkhaneh
- Farkhar
- Fowji
- Keykhosrow
- Khoshab
- Nurabad
- Ruki
- Sarajeh
- Seyyedabad
- Suzandeh
- Talebi
- Tarkhas
- Zarqi
