= Soltanabad, Khoshab =

City in Razavi Khorasan Province, Iran

Soltanabad Persian: سلطان‌ آباد
- City
- Location within Iran
- Coordinates: 36°24′15″N 58°02′21″E
- Country: Iran
- Province: Razavi Khorasan
- County: Khoshab
- District: Central

Population (2016)
  - Total: 5,932
- Time zone: UTC+3:30 (IRST)

Soltanabad (Persian: سلطان‌ آباد) (Note: Also romanized as Solţānābād; also known as Sultānābād) is a city in the Central District of Khoshab County, Razavi Khorasan Province, Iran, serving as the capital of both the county and the district. It is also the administrative center for Soltanabad Rural District.

== Demographics ==
=== Population ===
At the time of the 2006 National Census, the city's population was 4,821 in 1,232 households, when it was the capital of the former Khoshab District in Sabzevar County. The following census in 2011 counted 5,495 people in 1,508 households, by which time the district had been separated from the county in the establishment of Khoshab County. The city and the rural district were transferred to the new Central District, with Soltanabad as the county's capital. The 2016 census measured the population of the city as 5,932 people in 1,751 households.
