= Tabas Rural District =

Rural district in Razavi Khorasan province, Iran

Tabas Rural District Persian: دهستان طبس
- Rural District
- Location within Iran
- Coordinates: 36°26′N 57°50′E
- Country: Iran
- Province: Razavi Khorasan
- County: Khoshab
- District: Now Deh-e Anqolab
- Established: 1987
- Capital: Shamabad

Population (2016)
  - Total: 9,915
- Time zone: UTC+3:30 (IRST)

Tabas Rural District (Persian: دهستان طبس) is in Now Deh-e Anqolab District of Khoshab County, Razavi Khorasan province, Iran. Its capital is the village of Shamabad.

== Demographics ==
=== Population ===
At the time of the 2006 National Census, the rural district's population (as a part of the former Khoshab District in Sabzevar County) was 11,822 in 3,342 households. There were 11,105 inhabitants in 3,413 households at the following census of 2011, by which time the district had been separated from the county in the establishment of Khoshab County. The rural district was transferred to the new Central District. The 2016 census measured the population of the rural district as 9,915 in 3,367 households. The most populous of its 94 villages was Now Deh-e Anqolab (now a city), with 3,470 people.

In 2019, the rural district was separated from the district in the formation of Now Deh-e Anqolab District.

=== Other villages in the rural district ===
- Anbarestan
- Annabestan
- Baz Qand
- Borqeban
- Chahak
- Dashkhaneh
- Divandar
- Dorofk-e Olya
- Dorofk-e Sofla
- Kalateh-ye Hajji Motalleb
- Kashk
- Now Dehan
- Rud Sarab
- Shir Khan
- Tabas
