= Now Deh-e Anqolab District =

District in Razavi Khorasan province, Iran

Now Deh-e Anqolab District Persian: بخش نوده انقلاب
- District
- Location within Iran
- Coordinates: 36°27′N 57°46′E
- Country: Iran
- Province: Razavi Khorasan
- County: Khoshab
- Established: 2019
- Capital: Now Deh-e Anqolab
- Time zone: UTC+3:30 (IRST)

Now Deh-e Anqolab District (Persian: بخش نوده انقلاب) is in Khoshab County, Razavi Khorasan province, Iran. Its capital is the city of Now Deh-e Anqolab, whose population at the time of the 2016 National Census was 3,470 people in 1,149 households.

== History ==
In 2010, Khoshab District was separated from Sabzevar County in the establishment of Khoshab County, which was divided into two districts of two rural districts each, with Soltanabad as its capital and only city at the time.

In 2019, Tabas Rural District was separated from the Central District in the formation of Now Deh-e Anqolab District. The village of Now Deh-e Anqolab was converted to a city in 2020.

== Demographics ==
=== Administrative divisions ===
Now Deh-e Anqolab District
Administrative Divisions
Now Deh-e Anqolab RD
Tabas RD
Now Deh-e Anqolab (city) (Note: Became a city after the 2016 census)
RD = Rural District
