= Meshkan Rural District (Khoshab County) =

Rural district in Razavi Khorasan province, Iran

Meshkan Rural District Persian: دهستان مشکان
- Rural District
- Location within Iran
- Coordinates: 36°32′11″N 58°08′33″E
- Country: Iran
- Province: Razavi Khorasan
- County: Khoshab
- District: Meshkan
- Established: 1987
- Capital: Meshkan

Population (2016)
  - Total: 5,333
- Time zone: UTC+3:30 (IRST)

Meshkan Rural District (Persian: دهستان مشکان) (Note: Formerly Darreh Yam Rural District (دهستان دره ‌یام)) is in Meshkan District of Khoshab County, Razavi Khorasan province, Iran. It is administered from the city of Meshkan.

== Demographics ==
=== Population ===
At the time of the 2006 National Census, the rural district's population (as Darreh Yam Rural District of the former Khoshab District in Sabzevar County) was 10,607 in 2,660 households. There were 5,078 inhabitants in 1,320 households at the following census of 2011, by which time the district had been separated from the county in the establishment of Khoshab County. The rural district was transferred to the new Meshkan District and renamed Meshkan Rural District. The 2016 census measured its population as 5,333 in 1,565 households. The most populous of its 14 villages was Meshkan (now a city), with 3,540 people.

=== Other villages in the rural district ===
- Deh Now
- Gol Gonbad
- Istgah-e Rah Ahn Sabzevar
- Jambarjuq
- Robati Shahzadeh
- Yang
