= Meshkan District (Khoshab County) =

District in Razavi Khorasan province, Iran

Meshkan District Persian: بخش مشکان
- District
- Location within Iran
- Coordinates: 36°40′N 58°08′E
- Country: Iran
- Province: Razavi Khorasan
- County: Khoshab
- Established: 2010
- Capital: Meshkan

Population (2016)
  - Total: 10,012
- Time zone: UTC+3:30 (IRST)

Meshkan District (Persian: بخش مشکان) is in Khoshab County, Razavi Khorasan province, Iran. Its capital is the city of Meshkan.

== History ==
In 2010, Khoshab District was separated from Sabzevar County in the establishment of Khoshab County, which was divided into two districts of two rural districts each, with Soltanabad as its capital and only city at the time. The village of Meshkan was converted to a city in 2017.

== Demographics ==
=== Population ===
At the time of the 2011 National Census, the district's population was 10,569 people in 2,922 households. The 2016 census measured the population of the district as 10,012 inhabitants in 3,199 households.

=== Administrative divisions ===
Meshkan District Population
Administrative Divisions	2011	2016
Meshkan RD (Note: Formerly Darreh Yam Rural District)	5,078	5,333
Yam RD	5,491	4,679
Meshkan (city) (Note: Became a city after the 2016 census)		
Total	10,569	10,012
RD = Rural District
