= Central District (Khoshab County) =

District in Razavi Khorasan province, Iran

Central District (Khoshab County) Persian: بخش مرکزی شهرستان خوشاب
- District
- Location within Iran
- Coordinates: 36°25′N 58°02′E
- Country: Iran
- Province: Razavi Khorasan
- County: Khoshab
- Established: 2010
- Capital: Soltanabad

Population (2016)
  - Total: 27,169
- Time zone: UTC+3:30 (IRST)

The Central District of Khoshab County (Persian: بخش مرکزی شهرستان خوشاب) is in Razavi Khorasan province, Iran. Its capital is the city of Soltanabad.

== History ==
In 2010, Khoshab District was separated from Sabzevar County in the establishment of Khoshab County, which was divided into two districts of two rural districts each, with Soltanabad as its capital and only city at the time.

In 2019, Tabas Rural District was separated from the Central District in the formation of Now Deh-e Anqolab District.

== Demographics ==
=== Population ===
At the time of the 2011 National Census, the district's population was 27,345 people in 8,081 households. The 2016 census measured the population of the district as 27,169 inhabitants in 8,684 households.

=== Administrative divisions ===
Central District (Khoshab County) Population
Administrative Divisions	2011	2016
Robat-e Jaz RD	3,242	3,294
Soltanabad RD	7,503	8,028
Tabas RD (Note: Transferred to Now Deh-e Anqolab District after the 2016 census)	11,105	9,915
Soltanabad (city)	5,495	5,932
Total	27,345	27,169
RD = Rural District
