= Khoshab County =

County in Razavi Khorasan province, Iran

Khoshab County Persian: شهرستان خوشاب
- County
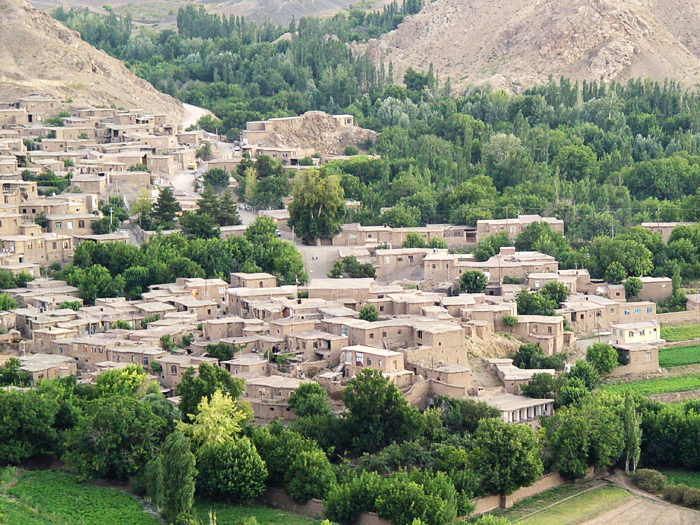
- The village of Tabas

- Location of Khoshab County in Razavi Khorasan province (top left, yellow)

- Location of Razavi Khorasan province in Iran
- Coordinates: 36°34′N 57°55′E
- Country: Iran
- Province: Razavi Khorasan
- Established: 2010
- Capital: Soltanabad
- Districts: Central, Meshkan, Now Deh-e Anqolab

Area
  - Total: 1,869 km^{2} (722 sq mi)

Population (2016)
  - Total: 37,181
  - Density: 19.89/km^{2} (51.52/sq mi)
- Time zone: UTC+3:30 (IRST)

Khoshab County (Persian: شهرستان خوشاب) is in Razavi Khorasan province, Iran. Its capital is the city of Soltanabad.

== History ==
In 2010, Khoshab District was separated from Sabzevar County in the establishment of Khoshab County, which was divided into two districts of two rural districts each, with Soltanabad as its capital and only city at the time.

In 2019, Tabas Rural District was separated from the Central District in the formation of Now Deh-e Anqolab District, including the new Now Deh-e Anqolab Rural District. The village of Meshkan was converted to a city in 2017, and likewise the village of Now Deh-e Anqolab in 2020.

== Demographics ==
=== Population ===
At the time of the 2011 National Census, the county's population was 37,914 people in 10,989 households. The 2016 census measured the population of the county as 37,181 in 11,883 households.

=== Administrative divisions ===
Khoshab County's population history and administrative structure over two consecutive censuses are shown in the following table.

Khoshab County Population
Administrative Divisions	2011	2016
Central District	27,345	27,169
Robat-e Jaz RD	3,242	3,294
Soltanabad RD	7,503	8,028
Tabas RD	11,105	9,915
Soltanabad (city)	5,495	5,932
Meshkan District	10,569	10,012
Meshkan RD (Note: Formerly Darreh Yam Rural District)	5,078	5,333
Yam RD	5,491	4,679
Meshkan (city) (Note: Became a city after the 2016 census)		
Now Deh-e Anqolab District (Note: Established after the 2016 census)		
Now Deh-e Anqolab RD		
Tabas RD		
Now Deh-e Anqolab (city) (Note: Became a city after the 2016 census)		
Total	37,914	37,181
RD = Rural District

== See also ==
Media related to Khoshab County at Wikimedia Commons
