= Khoshab District =

Former district in Razavi Khorasan province, Iran

Khoshab District Persian: بخش خوشاب
- Former District
- Location within Iran
- Coordinates: 36°34′N 57°55′E
- Country: Iran
- Province: Razavi Khorasan
- County: Sabzevar
- Capital: Soltanabad

Population (2006)
  - Total: 37,600
- Time zone: UTC+3:30 (IRST)

Khoshab District (Persian: بخش خوشاب) is a former administrative division of Sabzevar County, Razavi Khorasan province, Iran. Its capital was the city of Soltanabad.

== History ==
In 2010, the district was separated from the county in the establishment of Khoshab County.

== Demographics ==
=== Population ===
At the time of the 2006 National Census, the district's population was 37,600 in 9,944 households.

=== Administrative divisions ===
Khoshab District Population
Administrative Divisions	2006
Darreh Yam RD (Note: Renamed Meshkan Rural District)	10,607
Robat-e Jaz RD	3,221
Soltanabad RD	7,129
Tabas RD	11,822
Soltanabad (city)	4,821
Total	37,600
RD = Rural District
