= Administrative divisions of Vladimir Oblast =

Vladimir Oblast Russia
- Administrative center: Vladimir

Administrative structure (as of 2012)
- Districts: 16
- Cities/towns: 23
- Urban-type settlements: 9
- Selsovets: 0

Municipal structure (as of 2002)
- Rural settlements: 2,476 (inhabited); 252 (uninhabited)

Vladimir Oblast is a federal subject of Russia.

== Administrative and municipal divisions ==
- Towns under the federal government management:
  - Raduzhny (Радужный)
- Cities and towns under the oblast's jurisdiction:
  - Vladimir (Владимир) (administrative center)
    - City districts:
      - Frunzensky (Фрунзенский)
      - Leninsky (Ленинский)
      - Oktyabrsky (Октябрьский)
  - Gus-Khrustalny (Гусь-Хрустальный)
    - Settlements (of urban type) under the town's jurisdiction:
      - Gusevsky (Гусевский)
  - Kovrov (Ковров)
  - Murom (Муром)
- Districts:
  - Alexandrovsky (Александровский)
    - Towns under the district's jurisdiction:
      - Alexandrov (Александров)
      - Karabanovo (Карабаново)
      - Strunino (Струнино)
    - Settlements (of urban type) under the district's jurisdiction:
      - Balakirevo (Балакирево)
  - Gorokhovetsky (Гороховецкий)
    - Towns under the district's jurisdiction:
      - Gorokhovets (Гороховец)
  - Gus-Khrustalny (Гусь-Хрустальный)
    - Towns under the district's jurisdiction:
      - Kurlovo (Курлово)
  - Kameshkovsky (Камешковский)
    - Towns under the district's jurisdiction:
      - Kameshkovo (Камешково)
  - Kirzhachsky (Киржачский)
    - Towns under the district's jurisdiction:
      - Kirzhach (Киржач)
  - Kolchuginsky (Кольчугинский)
    - Towns under the district's jurisdiction:
      - Kolchugino (Кольчугино)
  - Kovrovsky (Ковровский)
    - Settlements (of urban type) under the district's jurisdiction:
      - Melekhovo (Мелехово)
  - Melenkovsky (Меленковский)
    - Towns under the district's jurisdiction:
      - Melenki (Меленки)
  - Muromsky (Муромский)
  - Petushinsky (Петушинский)
    - Towns under the district's jurisdiction:
      - Petushki (Петушки)
      - Kosteryovo (Костерёво)
      - Pokrov (Покров)
    - Settlements (of urban type) under the district's jurisdiction:
      - Gorodishchi (Городищи)
      - Volginsky (Вольгинский)
  - Selivanovsky (Селивановский)
    - Settlements (of urban type) under the district's jurisdiction:
      - Krasnaya Gorbatka (Красная Горбатка)
  - Sobinsky (Собинский)
    - Towns under the district's jurisdiction:
      - Lakinsk (Лакинск)
      - Sobinka (Собинка)
    - Settlements (of urban type) under the district's jurisdiction:
      - Stavrovo (Ставрово)
  - Sudogodsky (Судогодский)
    - Towns under the district's jurisdiction:
      - Sudogda (Судогда)
  - Suzdalsky (Суздальский)
    - Towns under the district's jurisdiction:
      - Suzdal (Суздаль)
  - Vyaznikovsky (Вязниковский)
    - Towns under the district's jurisdiction:
      - Vyazniki (Вязники)
    - Settlements (of urban type) under the district's jurisdiction:
      - Mstyora (Мстера)
      - Nikologory (Никологоры)
  - Yuryev-Polsky (Юрьев-Польский)
    - Towns under the district's jurisdiction:
      - Yuryev-Polsky (Юрьев-Польский)
