= Monument to Peter and Fevronia (Bataysk) =

Coordinates: 47°04′54″N 39°26′40″E

Monument to Prince Peter and Princess Fevronia
- Памятник князю Петру и княгине Февронии
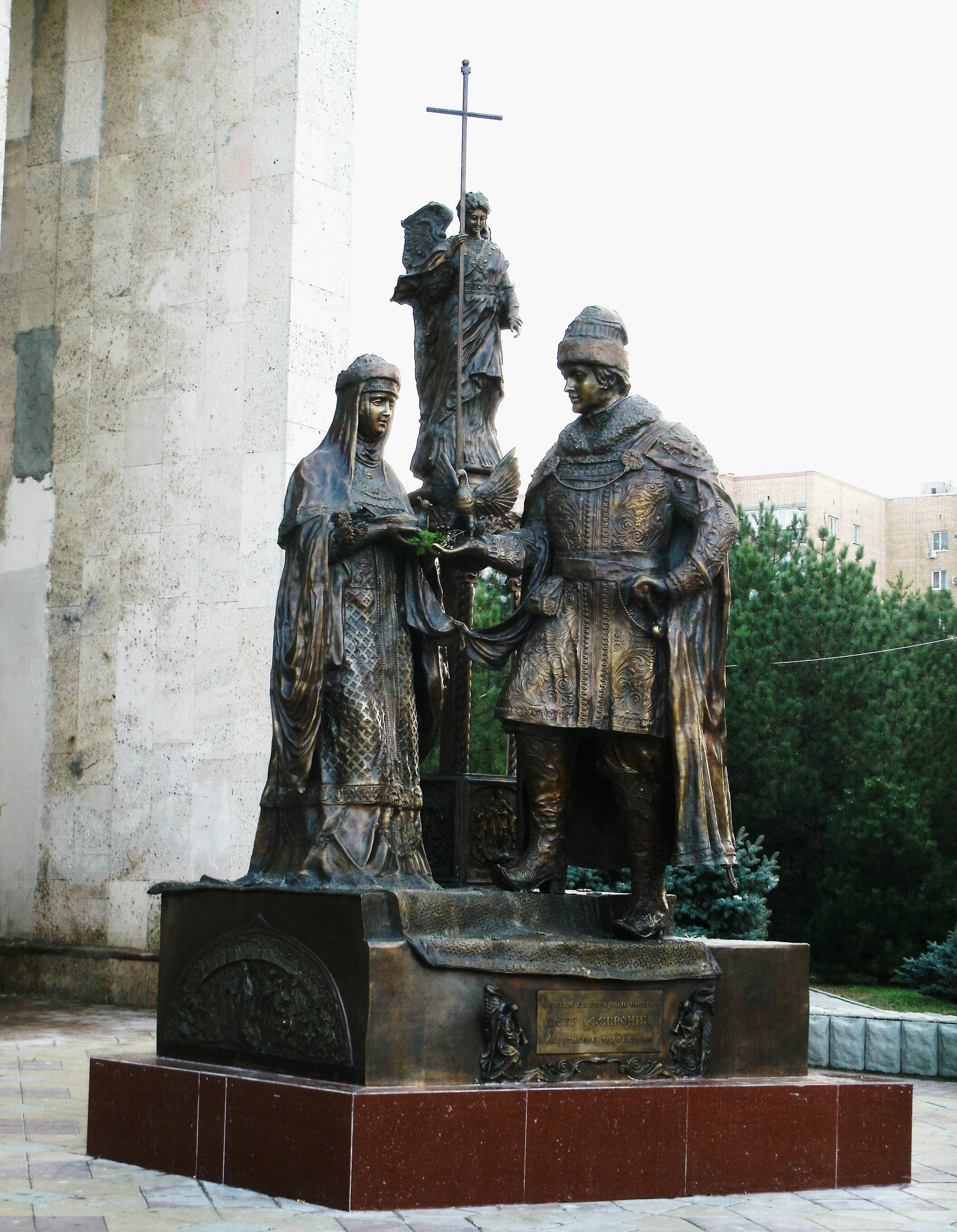
- Interactive map of Monument to Prince Peter and Princess Fevronia
- Location: Bataysk, Rostov Oblast, Russia
- Material: bronze, granite
- Opening date: 2011
- Dedicated to: Saints Peter and Fevronia of Murom

Monument to Prince Peter and Princess Fevronia (Russian: Памятник князю Петру и княгине Февронии) is a monument in Bataysk, Rostov Oblast, Russia. It is dedicated to Peter and Fevronia of Murom, a married couple venerated as saints in the Eastern Orthodox and Eastern Catholic Churches as an ideal of family love and fidelity. It was designed by sculptor Sergey Isakov, and installed in the city centre in 2011. It is one of the ten monuments dedicated to the couple in Russia.

== History and description ==
The unveiling of the Monument to Prince Peter and Princess Fevronia in Bataysk took place on 3 November 2011. Prince Peter was the second son of Yuri Vladimirovich, prince of Murom; according to the legend he and his wife Fevronia overcame a difficult path on the way to a happy married life.

They couple have been venerated as saints since the sixteenth century. The monument was installed with the blessing of Mercury, the Metropolitan of Rostov and Novocherkassk, and with the support of Vasily Golubev, the Governor of Rostov Oblast.

The monument is made of bronze. It is located at the entrance to the city cultural and leisure center. Sculptor Sergey Isakov, the designer of the monument, worked on it for about six years. The sculpture weighs two tons, and the height together with the pedestal is about four meters. Prince Peter and Princess Fevronia hold a dove, which is to be released into the sky. Above the newlyweds stands an angel, which, according to the sculptor's intention, is a patron of their marriage.

In July 2015, for the first time a liturgy was held near the monument to Peter and Fevronia. It was conducted by 25 priests of the Azov Deanery and the service itself was attended by more than a hundred Orthodox city residents.

== See also ==
- The Tale of Peter and Fevronia
- Peter and Fevronia Day
