= Kondrakovo =

Kondrakovo Кондраково
- Settlement
- Location within Vladimir Oblast Location within Russia
- Coordinates: 55°47′N 41°54′E
- Country: Russia
- Region: Vladimir Oblast
- District: Muromsky District
- Time zone: UTC+3:00

Kondrakovo (Russian: Кондраково) is a rural locality (a settlement) in Borisoglebskoye Rural Settlement, Muromsky District, Vladimir Oblast, Russia. The population was 373 as of 2010. There are 8 streets.

== Geography ==
Kondrakovo is located 33 km north of Murom (the district's administrative centre) by road. Talyzino is the nearest rural locality.
