= Kovarditsy =

Kovarditsy Ковардицы
- Selo
- Location within Vladimir Oblast Location within Russia
- Coordinates: 55°36′N 41°57′E
- Country: Russia
- Region: Vladimir Oblast
- District: Muromsky District
- Time zone: UTC+3:00

Kovarditsy (Russian: Ковардицы) is a rural locality (a selo) and the administrative center of Kovarditskoye Rural Settlement, Muromsky District, Vladimir Oblast, Russia. The population was 1,504 as of 2010. There are 35 streets.

== Geography ==
Kovarditsy is located 8 km northwest of Murom (the district's administrative centre) by road. Nezhilovka is the nearest rural locality.
