= Petrokovo =

Petrokovo Петроково
- Village
- Location within Vladimir Oblast Location within Russia
- Coordinates: 55°41′N 41°59′E
- Country: Russia
- Region: Vladimir Oblast
- District: Muromsky District
- Time zone: UTC+3:00

Petrokovo (Russian: Петроково) is a rural locality (a village) in Borisoglebskoye Rural Settlement, Muromsky District, Vladimir Oblast, Russia.

== Demographics ==
The population was 259 as of 2010. There are 5 streets.

== Geography ==
Petrokovo is located 16 km northwest of Murom (the district's administrative centre) by road. Lesnikovo is the nearest rural locality.
