= Olgino, Vladimir Oblast =

Olgino Ольгино
- Village
- Location within Vladimir Oblast Location within Russia
- Coordinates: 55°51′N 42°05′E
- Country: Russia
- Region: Vladimir Oblast
- District: Muromsky District
- Time zone: UTC+3:00

Olgino (Russian: Ольгино) is a rural locality (a village) in Borisoglebskoye Rural Settlement, Muromsky District, Vladimir Oblast, Russia. The population was 27 as of 2010.

== Geography ==
Olgino is located 35 km north of Murom (the district's administrative centre) by road. Tatarovo is the nearest rural locality.
