= Okheyevo =

Okheyevo Охеево
- Village
- Location within Vladimir Oblast Location within Russia
- Coordinates: 55°35′N 41°50′E
- Country: Russia
- Region: Vladimir Oblast
- District: Muromsky District
- Time zone: UTC+3:00

Okheyevo (Russian: Охеево) is a rural locality (a village) in Kovarditskoye Rural Settlement, Muromsky District, Vladimir Oblast, Russia. The population was 13 as of 2010.

== Geography ==
Okheyevo is located on the Kartyn River, 17 km west of Murom (the district's administrative centre) by road. Mikhaylovo is the nearest rural locality.
