= Glebovka =

Glebovka Глебовка
- Village
- Location within Vladimir Oblast Location within Russia
- Coordinates: 55°45′N 42°04′E
- Country: Russia
- Region: Vladimir Oblast
- District: Muromsky District
- Time zone: UTC+3:00

Glebovka (Russian: Глебовка) is a rural locality (a village) in Borisoglebskoye Rural Settlement, Muromsky District, Vladimir Oblast, Russia. The population was 28 as of 2010.

== Geography ==
Glebovka is located 23 km north of Murom (the district's administrative centre) by road. Varezh is the nearest rural locality.
