= Penza, Vladimir Oblast =

Penza Пенза
- Village
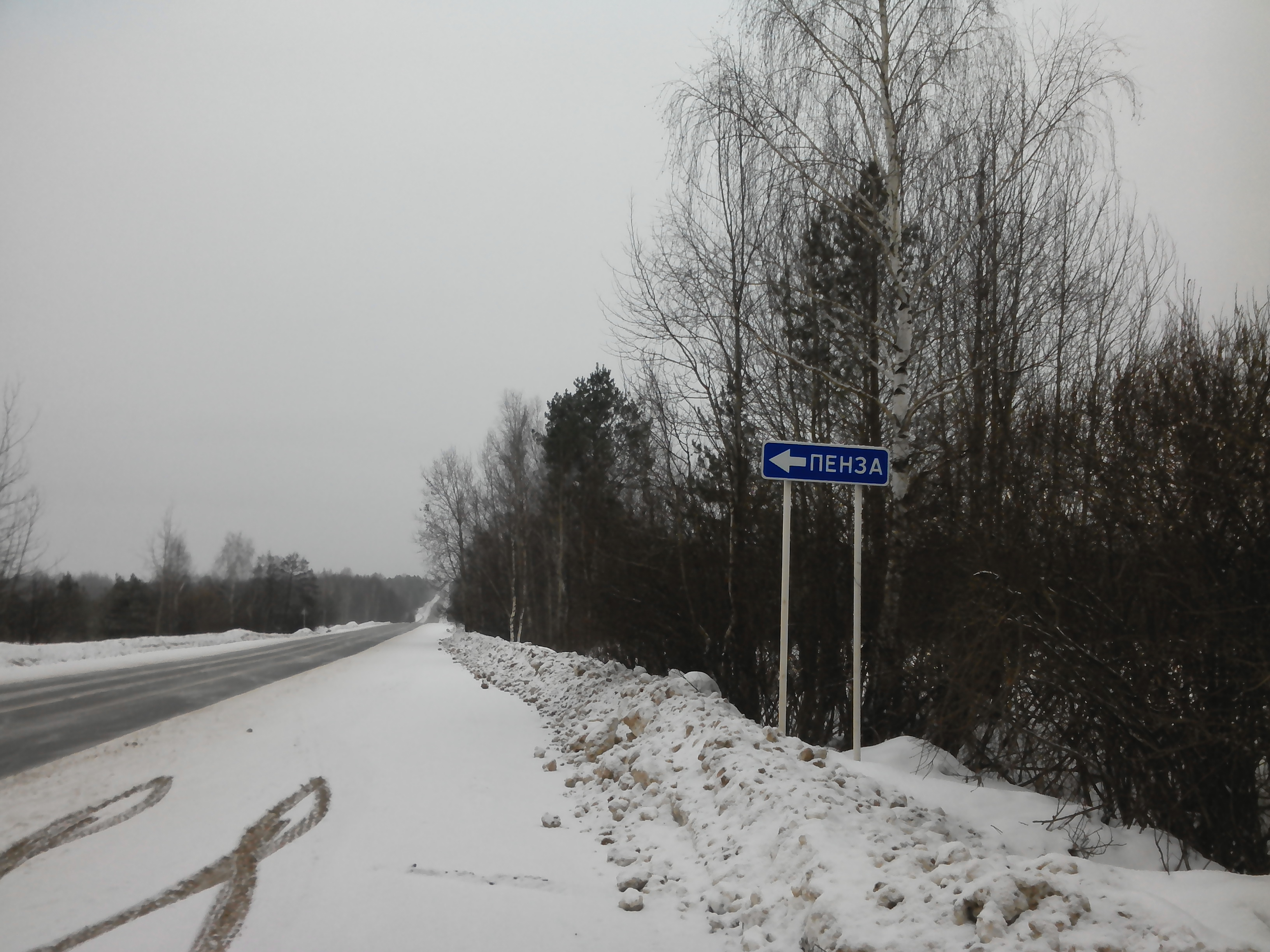

- Location within Vladimir Oblast Location within Russia
- Coordinates: 55°47′N 42°04′E
- Country: Russia
- Region: Vladimir Oblast
- District: Muromsky District
- Time zone: UTC+3:00

Penza (Russian: Пенза) is a rural locality (a village) in Borisoglebskoye Rural Settlement, Muromsky District, Vladimir Oblast, Russia. The population was 26 as of 2010. There are 2 streets.

== Geography ==
Penza is located 27 km of Murom (the district's administrative centre) by road. Probuzhdeniye is the nearest rural locality.
