= Varezh =

Varezh Вареж
- Village
- Location within Vladimir Oblast Location within Russia
- Coordinates: 55°44′N 42°00′E
- Country: Russia
- Region: Vladimir Oblast
- District: Muromsky District
- Time zone: UTC+3:00

Varezh (Russian: Вареж) is a rural locality (a village) in Borisoglebskoye Rural Settlement, Muromsky District, Vladimir Oblast, Russia. The population was 25 as of 2010. There are 5 streets.

== Geography ==
Varezh is located 23 km north of Murom (the district's administrative centre) by road. Molotitsy is the nearest rural locality.
