= Lazarevo, Muromsky District, Vladimir Oblast =

Lazarevo Лазарево
- Selo
- Location within Vladimir Oblast Location within Russia
- Coordinates: 55°33′N 41°57′E
- Country: Russia
- Region: Vladimir Oblast
- District: Muromsky District
- Time zone: UTC+3:00

Lazarevo (Russian: Ла́зарево) is a rural locality (a selo) in Kovarditskoye Rural Settlement, Muromsky District, Vladimir Oblast, Russia. The population was 274 as of 2010. There are 13 streets.

== Geography ==
Lazarevo is located 8 km southwest of Murom (the district's administrative centre) by road. Koldino is the nearest rural locality.
