= Tatarovo =

Tatarovo Татарово
- Selo
- Location within Vladimir Oblast Location within Russia
- Coordinates: 55°53′N 42°07′E
- Country: Russia
- Region: Vladimir Oblast
- District: Muromsky District
- Time zone: UTC+3:00

Tatarovo (Russian: Татарово) is a rural locality (a selo) in Borisoglebskoye Rural Settlement, Muromsky District, Vladimir Oblast, Russia. The population was 326 as of 2010. There are 4 streets.

== Geography ==
Tatarovo is located 39 km north of Murom (the district's administrative centre) by road. Nula is the nearest rural locality.
