= Volnino =

Volnino Волнино
- Village
- Location within Vladimir Oblast Location within Russia
- Coordinates: 55°42′N 42°01′E
- Country: Russia
- Region: Vladimir Oblast
- District: Muromsky District
- Time zone: UTC+3:00

Volnino (Russian: Волнино) is a rural locality (a village) in Borisoglebskoye Rural Settlement, Muromsky District, Vladimir Oblast, Russia. The population was 184 as of 2010. There are three streets.

== Geography ==
Volnino is located 16 km north of Murom (the district's administrative centre) by road. Borisogleb is the nearest rural locality.
