= Savanchakovo =

Savanchakovo Саванчаково
- Village
- Location within Vladimir Oblast Location within Russia
- Coordinates: 55°43′N 41°53′E
- Country: Russia
- Region: Vladimir Oblast
- District: Muromsky District
- Time zone: UTC+3:00

Savanchakovo (Russian: Саванчаково) is a rural locality (a village) in Borisoglebskoye Rural Settlement, Muromsky District, Vladimir Oblast, Russia. The population was 66 as of 2010. There are 5 streets.

== Geography ==
Savanchakovo is located 29 km northwest of Murom (the district's administrative centre) by road. Starye Kotlitsy is the nearest rural locality.
