= Okulovo =

Okulovo Окулово
- Village
- Location within Vladimir Oblast Location within Russia
- Coordinates: 55°36′N 41°47′E
- Country: Russia
- Region: Vladimir Oblast
- District: Muromsky District
- Time zone: UTC+3:00

Okulovo (Russian: Окулово) is a rural locality (a village) in Kovarditskoye Rural Settlement, Muromsky District, Vladimir Oblast, Russia. The population was 9 as of 2010.

== Geography ==
Okulovo is located 22 km west of Murom (the district's administrative centre) by road. Katyshevo is the nearest rural locality.
