= Saksino =

Saksino Саксино
- Village
- Location within Vladimir Oblast Location within Russia
- Coordinates: 55°38′N 41°56′E
- Country: Russia
- Region: Vladimir Oblast
- District: Muromsky District
- Time zone: UTC+3:00

Saksino (Russian: Саксино) is a rural locality (a village) in Kovarditskoye Rural Settlement, Muromsky District, Vladimir Oblast, Russia. The population was 199 as of 2010. There are 8 streets.

== Geography ==
Saksino is located 15 km northwest of Murom (the district's administrative centre) by road. Stepankovo is the nearest rural locality.
