= Yakimanskaya Sloboda =

Yakimanskaya Sloboda Якиманская Слобода
- Selo
- Location within Vladimir Oblast Location within Russia
- Coordinates: 55°35′N 42°02′E
- Country: Russia
- Region: Vladimir Oblast
- District: Murom Urban Okrug
- Time zone: UTC+3:00

Yakimanskaya Sloboda (Russian: Якиманская Слобода) is a rural locality (a selo) in Murom Urban Okrug, Vladimir Oblast, Russia. The population was 1,486 as of 2010. There are 10 streets.

== Geography ==
Yakimanskaya Sloboda is located 3 km north of Murom. Mekhanizatorov is the nearest rural locality.
