= Orlovo, Murom Urban Okrug, Vladimir Oblast =

Orlovo Орлово
- Village
- Location within Vladimir Oblast Location within Russia
- Coordinates: 55°32′N 42°01′E
- Country: Russia
- Region: Vladimir Oblast
- District: Murom Urban Okrug
- Time zone: UTC+3:00

Orlovo (Russian: Орлово) is a rural locality (a village) in Murom Urban Okrug, Vladimir Oblast, Russia. The population was 781 as of 2010. There are 4 streets.

== Geography ==
Orlovo is located 6 km southwest of Murom. Muromsky is the nearest rural locality.
