= Poleskovo =

Poleskovo Полесково
- Village
- Location within Vladimir Oblast Location within Russia
- Coordinates: 55°51′N 42°27′E
- Country: Russia
- Region: Vladimir Oblast
- District: Muromsky District
- Time zone: UTC+3:00

Poleskovo (Russian: Полесково) is a rural locality (a village) in Borisoglebskoye Rural Settlement, Muromsky District, Vladimir Oblast, Russia. The population was 10 as of 2010.

== Geography ==
Poleskovo is located 62 km northeast of Murom (the district's administrative centre) by road. Zakharovo is the nearest rural locality.
