= Koldino =

Koldino Кольдино
- Village
- Location within Vladimir Oblast Location within Russia
- Coordinates: 55°33′N 41°56′E
- Country: Russia
- Region: Vladimir Oblast
- District: Muromsky District
- Time zone: UTC+3:00

Koldino (Russian: Кольдино) is a rural locality (a village) in Kovarditskoye Rural Settlement, Muromsky District, Vladimir Oblast, Russia. The population was 73 as of 2010. There are 3 streets.

== Geography ==
Koldino is located on the Ilevna River, 9 km west of Murom (the district's administrative centre) by road. Lazarevo is the nearest rural locality.
