= Poltso =

Poltso Польцо
- Selo
- Location within Vladimir Oblast Location within Russia
- Coordinates: 55°46′N 42°13′E
- Country: Russia
- Region: Vladimir Oblast
- District: Muromsky District
- Time zone: UTC+3:00

Poltso (Russian: Польцо) is a rural locality (a selo) in Borisoglebskoye Rural Settlement, Muromsky District, Vladimir Oblast, Russia. The population was 308 as of 2010. There are 9 streets.

== Geography ==
Poltso is located 46 km northeast of Murom (the district's administrative centre) by road. Borok is the nearest rural locality.
