= Talyzino =

Talyzino Талызино
- Village
- Location within Vladimir Oblast Location within Russia
- Coordinates: 55°46′N 41°52′E
- Country: Russia
- Region: Vladimir Oblast
- District: Muromsky District
- Time zone: UTC+3:00

Talyzino (Russian: Талызино) is a rural locality (a village) in Borisoglebskoye Rural Settlement, Muromsky District, Vladimir Oblast, Russia. The population was 137 as of 2010. There are 4 streets.

== Geography ==
Talyzino is located 29 km north of Murom (the district's administrative centre) by road. Ignatyevo is the nearest rural locality.
