= Valovo =

Valovo Валово
- Village
- Location within Vladimir Oblast Location within Russia
- Coordinates: 55°37′N 41°52′E
- Country: Russia
- Region: Vladimir Oblast
- District: Muromsky District
- Time zone: UTC+3:00

Valovo (Russian: Валово) is a rural locality (a village) in Kovarditskoye Rural Settlement, Muromsky District, Vladimir Oblast, Russia. The population was 4 as of 2010.

== Geography ==
Valovo is located 15 km northwest of Murom (the district's administrative centre) by road. Dmitriyevka is the nearest rural locality.
