= Muromsky =

Muromsky (masculine), Muromskaya (feminine), or Muromskoye (neuter) may refer to:

- Muromsky District, a district of Vladimir Oblast
- Muromsky (family), a princely family of Rurikid stock
- Muromsky (rural locality), a rural locality (a settlement) in Muromsky District of Vladimir Oblast, Russia
- Muromskoye, a rural locality (a settlement) in Zelenogradsky District of Kaliningrad Oblast, Russia
