= Katyshevo =

Katyshevo Катышево
- Village
- Location within Vladimir Oblast Location within Russia
- Coordinates: 55°37′N 41°49′E
- Country: Russia
- Region: Vladimir Oblast
- District: Muromsky District
- Time zone: UTC+3:00

Katyshevo (Russian: Ка́тышево) is a rural locality (a village) in Kovarditskoye Rural Settlement, Muromsky District, Vladimir Oblast, Russia. The population was 7 as of 2010. There are 2 streets.

== Geography ==
Katyshevo is located on the Ilevna River, 21 km west of Murom (the district's administrative centre) by road. Okulovo is the nearest rural locality.
