= Mikhalchugovo =

Mikhalchugovo Михальчугово
- Village
- Location within Vladimir Oblast Location within Russia
- Coordinates: 55°55′N 42°03′E
- Country: Russia
- Region: Vladimir Oblast
- District: Muromsky District
- Time zone: UTC+3:00

Mikhalchugovo (Russian: Михальчугово) is a rural locality (a village) in Borisoglebskoye Rural Settlement, Muromsky District, Vladimir Oblast, Russia. The population was 3 as of 2010.

== Geography ==
Mikhalchugovo is located 42 km north of Murom (the district's administrative centre) by road. Chertkovo is the nearest rural locality.
