= Fabriki im. P. L. Voykova =

Fabriki im. P. L. Voykova Фабрики им. П. Л. Войкова
- Settlement
- Location within Vladimir Oblast Location within Russia
- Coordinates: 55°36′N 42°01′E
- Country: Russia
- Region: Vladimir Oblast
- District: Murom Urban Okrug
- Time zone: UTC+3:00

Fabriki im. P. L. Voykova (Russian: Фабрики им. П. Л. Войкова) is a rural locality (a settlement) in Murom Urban Okrug, Vladimir Oblast, Russia. The population was 1,383 as of 2010.

== Geography ==
Fabriki im. P. L. Voykova is located 6 km north of Murom. Dmitriyevskaya Sloboda is the nearest rural locality.
