= Probuzhdeniye =

Probuzhdeniye Пробуждение
- Village
- Location within Vladimir Oblast Location within Russia
- Coordinates: 55°49′N 42°04′E
- Country: Russia
- Region: Vladimir Oblast
- District: Muromsky District
- Time zone: UTC+3:00

Probuzhdeniye (Russian: Пробуждение) is a rural locality (a village) in Borisoglebskoye Rural Settlement, Muromsky District, Vladimir Oblast, Russia. The population was 18 as of 2010.

== Geography ==
Probuzhdeniye is located 30 km north of Murom (the district's administrative centre) by road. Ozhigovo is the nearest rural locality.
