= Aleshunino =

Aleshunino Алешунино
- Village
- Location within Vladimir Oblast Location within Russia
- Coordinates: 55°49′N 42°20′E
- Country: Russia
- Region: Vladimir Oblast
- District: Muromsky District
- Time zone: UTC+3:00

Aleshunino (Russian: Алешунино) is a rural locality (a village) in Borisoglebskoye Rural Settlement, Muromsky District, Vladimir Oblast, Russia. The population was 57 as of 2010. There are 2 streets.

== Geography ==
Aleshunino is located 53 km northeast of Murom (the district's administrative centre) by road. Krasny Bor is the nearest rural locality.
