= Constantine of Murom =

Russian saint

Saint Constantine the Blessed
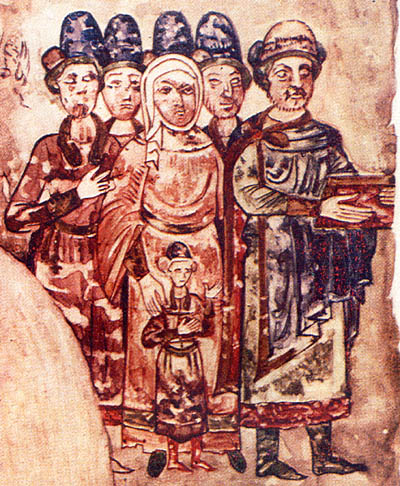
- Saint Constantine as a young man behind his parents, circa 1073

Right-Believing
- Born: c. 11th century Principality of Murom, Kievan Rus'
- Died: c. 1129; Principality of Murom, Kievan Rus'
- Venerated in: Eastern Orthodoxy
- Canonized: 1547, Makaryev Monastery, Nizhny Novgorod Oblast, Tsardom of Russia by Maxarius of Moscow
- Major shrine: Cathedral of the Annunciation, Murom, Russia
- Feast: 21 May
- Attributes: Clothed as Grand Prince, holding a three-bar cross in his right hand
- Patronage: Murom

Constantine of Murom (Russian: Святой Блаженный Князь Константин) (11th century - 1129) known as Saint Constantine the Blessed was a direct descendant of Vladimir I of Kiev and the son of Prince Svyatoslav of Chernigov. He is sometimes identified with Yaroslav Sviatoslavich, prince of Chernigov (1123–1127), but whether the two men are one and the same person is uncertain.

== Life ==
At Constantine's request, his father assigned him to rule the city of Murom, which at the time was inhabited by pagans, that he might spread Christianity in that region. According to the traditional account of his life, Constantine first sent his son Michael to Murom as his emissary, but the inhabitants threw him from the walls, so Constantine was obliged to take the city by force. However, he made no headway in converting them to Christianity and at one point they became so angry that a mob made their way to his fortress intending to storm the place. According to legend, when he appeared before them bearing what is now known as the Murom-Ryazan icon of the Theotokos, they quieted down and bowed reverently before the holy image. His son Fyodor, with his support, continued the missionary work in the surrounding countryside.

At the place of the murder of his son Michael, the wooden church of the Annunciation was reportedly founded by Prince Constantine in 1205. A new cathedral was built on the site in 1553. It became a monastery under Ivan the Terrible and was ruined by the Poles during the Time of Troubles. In 1664 it was rebuilt by wealthy merchant and arts patron Tarasy Tsvetnov. The monastery features the relics of Constantin and his sons Mikhail and Fyodor. According to a legend recorded by local aristocrat and amateur historian Alexander Yepanchin, each midnight the monastery's gates disappear, and Constantine, Mikhail and Fyodor, clad in regal attire, ride out in a gilded carriage and head to the Cathedral of the Nativity of Mary, where they are met by Pyotr and Fevronia. After praying there, they guard and patrol the city.

== Mother of God, "The Star Most Bright" ==
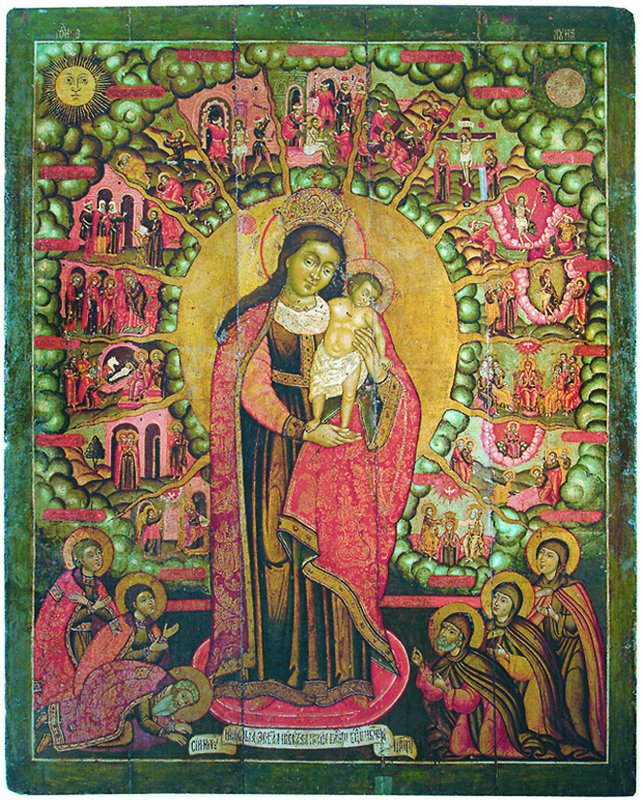
Theotokos the Most Bright Star

The icon shows a full-length representation of the Mother of God with a star sending forth rays of light in the background. The origin of its name is connected with the poetic hymns in honor of the Theotokos. Standing on her right hand is the infant Jesus. At her feet are Murom saints: Constantine, Mikhail and Fyodor arrayed in princely robes and Peter, Fevronia and Uliania clad in monastic habits. In the bottom part of the icon is the following inscription: 'This Marvelous Image Is the Star Most Bright of the Most Holy Lady Mother of God Queen of Heaven."

== Canonization ==
On 1547 Metropolitan Macarius of Moscow canonized Constantine as a saint in the Monastery of Makaryev, He is commemorated in the Russian Orthodox Church on May 21. His wife Irene is also venerated at Murom.

== Sources ==
- A reference in Russian Orthodox Calendar
- Life of the saint from the website of the Orthodox Church in America.
