= Mordvinovo, Muromsky District, Vladimir Oblast =

Mordvinovo Мордвиново
- Village
- Location within Vladimir Oblast Location within Russia
- Coordinates: 55°39′N 41°45′E
- Country: Russia
- Region: Vladimir Oblast
- District: Muromsky District
- Time zone: UTC+3:00

Mordvinovo (Russian: Мордвиново) is a rural locality (a village) in Kovarditskoye Rural Settlement, Muromsky District, Vladimir Oblast, Russia. The population was 88 as of 2010.

== Geography ==
Mordvinovo is located 28 km northeast of Murom (the district's administrative centre) by road. Zaroslovo is the nearest rural locality.
