= Bezlesnaya =

Bezlesnaya Безлесная
- Settlement
- Location within Vladimir Oblast Location within Russia
- Coordinates: 55°44′N 41°45′E
- Country: Russia
- Region: Vladimir Oblast
- District: Muromsky District
- Time zone: UTC+3:00

Bezlesnaya (Russian: Безле́сная) is a rural locality (a settlement) in Kovarditskoye Rural Settlement, Muromsky District, Vladimir Oblast, Russia. The population was 13 as of 2010.

== Geography ==
The village is located 22 km north-west from Kovarditsy, 28 km north-west from Murom.
