= Krivitsy =

Krivitsy Кривицы
- Village
- Location within Vladimir Oblast Location within Russia
- Coordinates: 55°31′N 41°54′E
- Country: Russia
- Region: Vladimir Oblast
- District: Muromsky District
- Time zone: UTC+3:00

Krivitsy (Russian: Кривицы) is a rural locality (a village) in Kovarditskoye Rural Settlement, Muromsky District, Vladimir Oblast, Russia. The population was 152 as of 2010.

== Geography ==
Krivitsy is located on the Zhernovka River, 15 km southwest of Murom (the district's administrative centre) by road. Staroye Ratovo is the nearest rural locality.
