= Nezhilovka =

Nezhilovka Нежиловка
- Village
- Location within Vladimir Oblast Location within Russia
- Coordinates: 55°35′N 41°59′E
- Country: Russia
- Region: Vladimir Oblast
- District: Muromsky District
- Time zone: UTC+3:00

Nezhilovka (Russian: Нежиловка) is a rural locality (a village) in Muromsky District, Vladimir Oblast, Russia. The population was 209 as of 2010.

== Geography ==
Nezhilovka is located 6 km northwest of Murom. Murom is the nearest rural locality.
