= Borovitsy, Vladimir Oblast =

Borovitsy Боровицы
- Selo
- Location within Vladimir Oblast Location within Russia
- Coordinates: 55°48′N 42°21′E
- Country: Russia
- Region: Vladimir Oblast
- District: Muromsky District
- Time zone: UTC+3:00

Borovitsy (Russian: Боровицы) is a rural locality (a selo) in Borisoglebskoye Rural Settlement, Muromsky District, Vladimir Oblast, Russia. The population was 108 as of 2010. There are 3 streets.

== Geography ==
Borovitsy is located 56 km northeast of Murom (the district's administrative centre) by road. Martynovo is the nearest rural locality.
