= Dmitriyevskaya Sloboda =

Dmitriyevskaya Sloboda Дмитриевская Слобода
- Selo
- Location within Vladimir Oblast Location within Russia
- Coordinates: 55°36′N 42°02′E
- Country: Russia
- Region: Vladimir Oblast
- District: Muromsky District
- Time zone: UTC+3:00

Dmitriyevskaya Sloboda (Russian: Дми́триевская Слобода́) is a rural locality (a selo) in Muromsky District, Vladimir Oblast, Russia. The population was 1,381 as of 2010. There are 11 streets.

== Geography ==
Dmitriyevskaya Sloboda is located 4 km north of Murom. Fabriki im. P. L. Voykova is the nearest rural locality.
