= Ramezhki =

Ramezhki Рамежки
- Village
- Location within Vladimir Oblast Location within Russia
- Coordinates: 55°36′N 41°51′E
- Country: Russia
- Region: Vladimir Oblast
- District: Muromsky District
- Time zone: UTC+3:00

Ramezhki (Russian: Рамежки) is a rural locality (a village) in Kovarditskoye Rural Settlement, Muromsky District, Vladimir Oblast, Russia. The population was 34 as of 2010.

== Geography ==
Ramezhki is located on the Ilevna River, 16 km northwest of Murom (the district's administrative centre) by road. Pestenkino is the nearest rural locality.
