= Martynovo, Vladimir Oblast =

Martynovo Мартыново
- Village
- Location within Vladimir Oblast Location within Russia
- Coordinates: 55°48′N 42°22′E
- Country: Russia
- Region: Vladimir Oblast
- District: Muromsky District
- Time zone: UTC+3:00

Martynovo (Russian: Марты́ново) is a rural locality (a village) in Borisoglebskoye Rural Settlement, Muromsky District, Vladimir Oblast, Russia. The population was 11 as of 2010.

== Geography ==
Martynovo is located 57 km northeast of Murom (the district's administrative centre) by road. Borovitsy is the nearest rural locality.
