= Shishlovo =

Shishlovo Шишлово
- Village
- Location within Vladimir Oblast Location within Russia
- Coordinates: 55°43′N 41°45′E
- Country: Russia
- Region: Vladimir Oblast
- District: Muromsky District
- Time zone: UTC+3:00

Shishlovo (Russian: Шишлово) is a rural locality (a village) in Kovarditskoye Rural Settlement, Muromsky District, Vladimir Oblast, Russia. The population was 7 as of 2010.

== Geography ==
Shishlovo is located 37 km northwest of Murom (the district's administrative centre) by road. Ivankovo is the nearest rural locality.
