= Posyolok Mekhanizatorov =

Posyolok Mekhanizatorov Посёлок Механизаторов
- Settlement
- Location within Vladimir Oblast Location within Russia
- Coordinates: 55°36′N 42°02′E
- Country: Russia
- Region: Vladimir Oblast
- District: Muromsky District
- Time zone: UTC+3:00

Posyolok Mekhanizatorov (Russian: Посёлок Механизаторов) is a rural locality (a settlement) in Muromsky District, Vladimir Oblast, Russia. The population was 2,227 as of 2010.

== Geography ==
Posyolok Mekhanizatorov is located 3 km north of Murom. Yakimanskaya Sloboda is the nearest rural locality.
