= Starye Kotlitsy =

Starye Kotlitsy Старые Котлицы
- Village
- Location within Vladimir Oblast Location within Russia
- Coordinates: 55°42′N 41°55′E
- Country: Russia
- Region: Vladimir Oblast
- District: Muromsky District
- Time zone: UTC+3:00

Starye Kotlitsy (Russian: Старые Котлицы) is a rural locality (a village) in Kovarditskoye Rural Settlement, Muromsky District, Vladimir Oblast, Russia. The population was 34 as of 2010. There are 4 streets.

== Geography ==
Starye Kotlitsy is located 22 km northwest of Murom (the district's administrative centre) by road. Sovanchakovo is the nearest rural locality.
