= Mikhaylovo =

Mikhaylovo Михайлово
- Village
- Location within Vladimir Oblast Location within Russia
- Coordinates: 55°35′N 41°49′E
- Country: Russia
- Region: Vladimir Oblast
- District: Muromsky District
- Time zone: UTC+3:00

Mikhaylovo (Russian: Миха́йлово) is a rural locality (a village) in Kovarditskoye Rural Settlement, Muromsky District, Vladimir Oblast, Russia. The population was 25 as of 2010. There are 2 streets.

== Geography ==
Mikhaylovo is on the Kartyn River, 19 kilometres (12 mi) west of Murom (the district's administrative centre) by road. Okheyevo is the nearest rural locality.
