= Sosnitsy =

Sosnitsy Сосницы
- Village
- Location within Vladimir Oblast Location within Russia
- Coordinates: 55°47′N 42°15′E
- Country: Russia
- Region: Vladimir Oblast
- District: Muromsky District
- Time zone: UTC+3:00

Sosnitsy (Russian: Сосницы) is a rural locality (a village) in Borisoglebskoye Rural Settlement, Muromsky District, Vladimir Oblast, Russia. The population was 7 as of 2010. There are 3 streets.

== Geography ==
Sosnitsy is located 49 km northeast of Murom (the district's administrative centre) by road. Shumilikha is the nearest rural locality.
