= Zagryazhskoye =

Zagryazhskoye Загряжское
- Village
- Location within Vladimir Oblast Location within Russia
- Coordinates: 55°29′N 42°01′E
- Country: Russia
- Region: Vladimir Oblast
- District: Muromsky District
- Time zone: UTC+3:00

Zagryazhskoye (Russian: Загряжское) is a rural locality (a village) in Kovarditskoye Rural Settlement, Muromsky District, Vladimir Oblast, Russia. The population was 152 as of 2010. There are 4 streets.

== Geography ==
Zagryazhskoye is located on the Ilevna River, 13 km south of Murom (the district's administrative centre) by road. Panfilovo is the nearest rural locality.
