= Savkovo, Vladimir Oblast =

Savkovo Савково
- Village
- Location within Vladimir Oblast Location within Russia
- Coordinates: 55°40′N 41°54′E
- Country: Russia
- Region: Vladimir Oblast
- District: Muromsky District
- Time zone: UTC+3:00

Savkovo (Russian: Савково) is a rural locality (a village) in Kovarditskoye Rural Settlement, Muromsky District, Vladimir Oblast, Russia. The population was 367 as of 2010. There are 6 streets.

== Geography ==
Savkovo is located 21 km northwest of Murom (the district's administrative centre) by road. Popolutovo is the nearest rural locality.
