= Staroye Ratovo =

Staroye Ratovo Старое Ратово
- Village
- Location within Vladimir Oblast Location within Russia
- Coordinates: 55°30′N 41°54′E
- Country: Russia
- Region: Vladimir Oblast
- District: Muromsky District
- Time zone: UTC+3:00

Staroye Ratovo (Russian: Старое Ратово) is a rural locality (a village) in Kovarditskoye Rural Settlement, Muromsky District, Vladimir Oblast, Russia. The population was 139 as of 2010. There are 4 streets.

== Geography ==
Staroye Ratovo is located 14 km southwest of Murom (the district's administrative centre) by road. Krivitsy is the nearest rural locality.
