= Gribkovo =

Gribkovo Грибково
- Village
- Location within Vladimir Oblast Location within Russia
- Coordinates: 55°32′N 41°51′E
- Country: Russia
- Region: Vladimir Oblast
- District: Muromsky District
- Time zone: UTC+3:00

Gribkovo (Russian: Грибково) is a rural locality (a village) in Kovarditskoye Rural Settlement, Muromsky District, Vladimir Oblast, Russia. The population was 61 as of 2010.

== Geography ==
Gribkovo is located 19 km west of Murom (the district's administrative centre) by road. Strigino is the nearest rural locality.
