= Baburino, Muromsky District, Vladimir Oblast =

Baburino Бабурино
- Village
- Location within Vladimir Oblast Location within Russia
- Coordinates: 55°41′N 41°52′E
- Country: Russia
- Region: Vladimir Oblast
- District: Muromsky District
- Time zone: UTC+3:00

Baburino (Russian: Бабу́рино) is a rural locality (a village) in Kovarditskoye Rural Settlement, Muromsky District, Vladimir Oblast, Russia. The population was 4 as of 2010.

== Geography ==
Baburino is located 32 km northwest of Murom (the district's administrative centre) by road. Dyakonovo is the nearest rural locality.
