= Zaroslovo =

Zaroslovo Зарослово
- Village
- Location within Vladimir Oblast Location within Russia
- Coordinates: 55°38′N 41°45′E
- Country: Russia
- Region: Vladimir Oblast
- District: Muromsky District
- Time zone: UTC+3:00

Zaroslovo (Russian: Зарослово) is a rural locality (a village) in Kovarditskoye Rural Settlement, Muromsky District, Vladimir Oblast, Russia. The population was 13 as of 2010. There are 4 streets.

== Geography ==
Zaroslovo is located 23 km northwest of Murom (the district's administrative centre) by road. Mordvinovo is the nearest rural locality.
