= Borisogleb, Muromsky District, Vladimir Oblast =

Borisogleb Борисоглеб
- Selo
- Location within Vladimir Oblast Location within Russia
- Coordinates: 55°42′N 42°00′E
- Country: Russia
- Region: Vladimir Oblast
- District: Muromsky District
- Time zone: UTC+3:00

Borisogleb (Russian: Борисогле́б) is a rural locality (a selo) and the administrative center of Borisoglebskoye Rural Settlement, Muromsky District, Vladimir Oblast, Russia. The population was 659 as of 2010. There are 7 streets.

== Geography ==
Borisogleb is located on the right bank of the Ushna River, 17 km north of Murom (the district's administrative centre) by road. Petrokovo is the nearest rural locality.
