= Bolshoye Yuryevo =

Bolshoye Yuryevo Большое Юрьево
- Village
- Location within Vladimir Oblast Location within Russia
- Coordinates: 55°35′N 41°52′E
- Country: Russia
- Region: Vladimir Oblast
- District: Muromsky District
- Time zone: UTC+3:00

Bolshoye Yuryevo (Russian: Большо́е Ю́рьево) is a rural locality (a village) in Kovarditskoye Rural Settlement, Muromsky District, Vladimir Oblast, Russia. The population was 21 as of 2010. There are 5 streets.

== Geography ==
Bolshoye Yuryevo is located on the Kartyn River, 14 km west of Murom (the district's administrative centre) by road. Maloye Yuryevo is the nearest rural locality.
