= Maloye Yuryevo =

Maloye Yuryevo Малое Юрьево
- Village
- Location within Vladimir Oblast Location within Russia
- Coordinates: 55°35′N 41°51′E
- Country: Russia
- Region: Vladimir Oblast
- District: Muromsky District
- Time zone: UTC+3:00

Maloye Yuryevo (Russian: Ма́лое Ю́рьево) is a rural locality (a village) in Kovarditskoye Rural Settlement, Muromsky District, Vladimir Oblast, Russia. The population was 16 as of 2010.

== Geography ==
Maloye Yuryevo is located on the Kartyn River, 16 km west of Murom (the district's administrative centre) by road. Okheyevo is the nearest rural locality.
