= Strigino =

Strigino Стригино
- Selo
- Location within Vladimir Oblast Location within Russia
- Coordinates: 55°33′N 41°53′E
- Country: Russia
- Region: Vladimir Oblast
- District: Muromsky District
- Time zone: UTC+3:00

Strigino (Russian: Стригино́) is a rural locality (a selo) in Kovarditskoye Rural Settlement, Muromsky District, Vladimir Oblast, Russia. The population was 346 as of 2010. There are 6 streets.

== Geography ==
Strigino is located 15 km west of Murom (the district's administrative centre) by road. Gribkovo is the nearest rural locality.
