= Korzhavino =

Korzhavino Коржавино
- Village
- Location within Vladimir Oblast Location within Russia
- Coordinates: 55°34′N 41°55′E
- Country: Russia
- Region: Vladimir Oblast
- District: Muromsky District
- Time zone: UTC+3:00

Korzhavino (Russian: Коржа́вино) is a rural locality (a village) in Kovarditskoye Rural Settlement, Muromsky District, Vladimir Oblast, Russia. The population was 62 as of 2010. There are 7 streets.

== Geography ==
Korzhavino is located on the Ilevna River, 10 km west of Murom (the district's administrative centre) by road. Makarovka is the nearest rural locality.
