= Khorobritsy =

Khorobritsy Хоробрицы
- Village
- Location within Vladimir Oblast Location within Russia
- Coordinates: 55°44′N 41°53′E
- Country: Russia
- Region: Vladimir Oblast
- District: Muromsky District
- Time zone: UTC+3:00

Khorobritsy (Russian: Хоробрицы) is a rural locality (a village) in Borisoglebskoye Rural Settlement, Muromsky District, Vladimir Oblast, Russia. The population was 50 as of 2010. There are 2 streets.

== Geography ==
Khorobritsy is located 29 km northwest of Murom (the district's administrative centre) by road. Sovanchakovo is the nearest rural locality.
