= Prudishchi =

Prudishchi Прудищи
- Village
- Location within Vladimir Oblast Location within Russia
- Coordinates: 55°44′N 41°53′E
- Country: Russia
- Region: Vladimir Oblast
- District: Muromsky District
- Time zone: UTC+3:00

Prudishchi (Russian: Прудищи) is a rural locality (a village) in Borisoglebskoye Rural Settlement, Muromsky District, Vladimir Oblast, Russia. The population was 265 as of 2010. There are 6 streets.

== Geography ==
Prudishchi is located 28 km northwest of Murom (the district's administrative centre) by road. Sovanchakovo is the nearest rural locality.
