= Mezhishchi =

Mezhishchi Межищи
- Village
- Location within Vladimir Oblast Location within Russia
- Coordinates: 55°42′N 41°48′E
- Country: Russia
- Region: Vladimir Oblast
- District: Muromsky District
- Time zone: UTC+3:00

Mezhishchi (Russian: Межищи) is a rural locality (a village) in Kovarditskoye Rural Settlement, Muromsky District, Vladimir Oblast, Russia. The population was 189 as of 2010. There are 3 streets.

== Geography ==
Mezhishchi is located 27 km northeast of Murom (the district's administrative centre) by road. Bulatnikovo is the nearest rural locality.
