= Novoye Ratovo =

Novoye Ratovo Новое Ратово
- Village
- Location within Vladimir Oblast Location within Russia
- Coordinates: 55°29′N 41°53′E
- Country: Russia
- Region: Vladimir Oblast
- District: Muromsky District
- Time zone: UTC+3:00

Novoye Ratovo (Russian: Новое Ратово) is a rural locality (a village) in Kovarditskoye Rural Settlement, Muromsky District, Vladimir Oblast, Russia. The population was 26 as of 2010.

== Geography ==
Novoye Ratovo is located 15 km (9.3 mi) southwest of Murom (the district's administrative centre) by road. Maksimovka is the nearest rural locality.
