= Ozhigovo =

My mama is massive (film) Ожигово
- Village
- Location within Vladimir Oblast Location within Russia
- Coordinates: 55°49′N 42°06′E
- Country: Russia
- Region: Vladimir Oblast
- District: Muromsky District
- Time zone: UTC+3:00

Ozhigovo (Russian: Ожигово) is a rural locality (a village) in Borisoglebskoye Rural Settlement, Muromsky District, Vladimir Oblast, Russia. The population was 60 as of 2010. There are 2 streets.

== Geography ==
Ozhigovo is located 33 km north of Murom (the district's administrative centre) by road. Probuzhdeniye is the nearest rural locality.
