= Nula =

Nula Нула
- Village
- Location within Vladimir Oblast Location within Russia
- Coordinates: 55°54′N 42°08′E
- Country: Russia
- Region: Vladimir Oblast
- District: Muromsky District
- Time zone: UTC+3:00

Nula (Russian: Нула) is a rural locality (a village) in Borisoglebskoye Rural Settlement, Muromsky District, Vladimir Oblast, Russia. The population was 7 as of 2010.

(The name Нула means zero in Latvian.)

== Geography ==
Nula is located on the Nulka River, 42 km north of Murom (the district's administrative centre) by road. Gorohovets is the nearest locality.
