= Lesnikovo, Muromsky District, Vladimir Oblast =

Lesnikovo Лесниково
- Village
- Location within Vladimir Oblast Location within Russia
- Coordinates: 55°40′N 41°55′E
- Country: Russia
- Region: Vladimir Oblast
- District: Muromsky District
- Time zone: UTC+3:00

Lesnikovo (Russian: Лесниково) is a rural locality (a village) in Kovarditskoye Rural Settlement, Muromsky District, Vladimir Oblast, Russia. The population was 77 as of 2010. There are 3 streets.

== Geography ==
Lesnikovo is located 19 km northwest of Murom (the district's administrative centre) by road. Savkovo is the nearest rural locality.
