= Kurlovo =

Kurlovo (Russian: Курлово) is the name of several inhabited localities in Russia.

Urban localities

- Kurlovo (town), Vladimir Oblast, a town in Gus-Khrustalny District of Vladimir Oblast

Rural localities

- Kurlovo, Kirov Oblast, a village in Kaksinvaysky Rural Okrug of Malmyzhsky District in Kirov Oblast
- Kurlovo (rural locality), Vladimir Oblast, a village in Gus-Khrustalny District of Vladimir Oblast
