= Cheremisino, Vladimir Oblast =

Cheremisino Черемисино
- Village
- Location within Vladimir Oblast Location within Russia
- Coordinates: 55°31′N 41°56′E
- Country: Russia
- Region: Vladimir Oblast
- District: Muromsky District
- Time zone: UTC+3:00

Cheremisino (Russian: Череми́сино) is a rural locality (a village) in Kovarditskoye Rural Settlement, Muromsky District, Vladimir Oblast, Russia. The population was 80 as of 2010. There are 2 streets.

== Geography ==
Cheremisino is located on the Ilevna River, 13 km southwest of Murom (the district's administrative centre) by road. Zhemchuzhino is the nearest rural locality.
