= Berdishchevo =

Berdishchevo Бердищево
- Village
- Location within Vladimir Oblast Location within Russia
- Coordinates: 55°42′N 41°56′E
- Country: Russia
- Region: Vladimir Oblast
- District: Muromsky District
- Time zone: UTC+3:00

Berdishchevo (Russian: Бердищево) is a rural locality (a village) in Kovarditskoye Rural Settlement, Muromsky District, Vladimir Oblast, Russia. The population was 5 as of 2010. There are 3 streets.

== Geography ==
Berdishchevo is located 20 km northwest of Murom (the district's administrative centre) by road. Starye Kotlitsy is the nearest rural locality.
