= Pestenkino =

Pestenkino Пестенькино
- Village
- Location within Vladimir Oblast Location within Russia
- Coordinates: 55°36′N 41°52′E
- Country: Russia
- Region: Vladimir Oblast
- District: Muromsky District
- Time zone: UTC+3:00

Pestenkino (Russian: Пестенькино) is a rural locality (a village) in Kovarditskoye Rural Settlement, Muromsky District, Vladimir Oblast, Russia. The population was 778 as of 2010. There are 8 streets.

== Geography ==
Pestenkino is located 15 km northwest of Murom (the district's administrative centre) by road. Ramezhki is the nearest rural locality.
