= Peter and Fevronia Day =

Holiday observed on July 8

Saints Peter and Fevronia Day
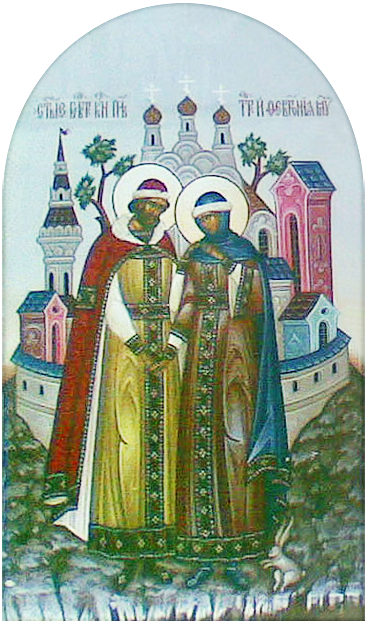
- Mural Art of Saints Peter and Fevronia of Murom at the Spaso-Preobrazhensky Monastery, circa 2000
- Observed by: Russia
- Type: Cultural, Orthodox
- Significance: Feast day of Saints Peter and Fevronia of Murom, Day of Love and Fidelity celebrated between Marrieds
- Observances: Sending greeting cards, gifts and flowers (oxeye daisy), dating, church services
- Date: July 8
- Next time: 8 July 2026
- Frequency: Annual

The Day of Saint Peter and Saint Fevronia (Russian: День Святых Петра и Февроньи / Den' Svyatyh Petra i Phevronii) also known as the Day of Family, Love and Faithfulness (Russian: Де́нь семьи́, любви́ и ве́рности / Den' sem'i lyubvi i vernosti), the Orthodox patrons of marriage, was officially introduced in Russia in 2008. Svetlana Medvedeva is among the most active promoters of the new holiday. Its symbol is a white daisy.

== History ==
The Day of Saints Peter and Fevronia since the days of Kievan Rus and until 1917, was broadly celebrated in Russia because it is believed that the Saints Peter and Fevronia are the patrons of marriage and family, as well as the symbols of love and fidelity. On this day it was common to go to church, where the people asked for love and family grace.

The Tale of Peter and Fevronia of Murom (which literary treatment relates to the period of the mid-16th century), Duke Peter was the second son of Duke Yuri Vladimirovich of Murom. He ascended the throne in 1203. A few years before Peter’s principality he became seriously ill that no one could cure him. One day the duke had a dream that he could be healed by a peasant girl, named Fevronia.

Fevronia (Greek Φεβρωνία) was beautiful, pious and good, plus she was a wise woman, she knew the properties of herbs and could cure ailments. Fevronia promised the prince that she could indeed cure him, but she said that he must also marry her. Since she was a commoner, the prince believed that he could not do such a thing because of his noble status, but he desperately wanted to be cured, so he vowed to marry her after the healing. The girl cured the duke, but he went back on his promise and did not marry her. The disease came back, this time even worse, and, humbled by this situation he returned to Fevronia, and Fevronia cured him once again. This time the duke married the girl.

This marriage was marked by Peter and Fevronia's profoundly deep love for one another, which they nourished by God's grace for their whole lives.

After the death of his brother Peter inherited the throne. The nobles (or boyars) respected his duke, but the haughty nobles’ wives disliked Fevronia, not wanting to be ruled by the peasant. The nobles demanded that the duke leave her. Peter, after he heard of the intentions of separating him from the beloved wife, chose to voluntarily relinquish the power and wealth and go with her in exile. So Peter and Fevronia left Murom.

Soon the unrest began in Murom, nobles were quarreling, fighting for the throne. Then they came around, gathered a council and invited the duke and his wife back. The duke and duchess returned and Fevronia managed to earn the love of the urban counterparts. They ruled after that long and happily.

In his declining years, Peter and Fevronia took the vows in various monasteries and asked God to die in one day. They bequeathed to bury them in a specially prepared coffin with a thin partition in the middle.

Peter and Fevronia died, each in his or her own cell, on the same day and hour - on 8 July 1228. But people wickedly refused to honor their request to be buried in one coffin and they broke the will of the dead: their bodies were placed in the different realms. But the very next day they were found together. Twice their bodies were carried out to the different churches, but twice they miraculously were found side by side. And the spouses were buried together in the city of Murom at the cathedral church of the Nativity of the Blessed Virgin.

Since that time the history of the spouses of Peter and Fevronia is the embodiment of the unquenchable love and loyalty and every year on 8 July the Eastern Orthodox Church celebrates the memory of Saints Peter and Fevronia.

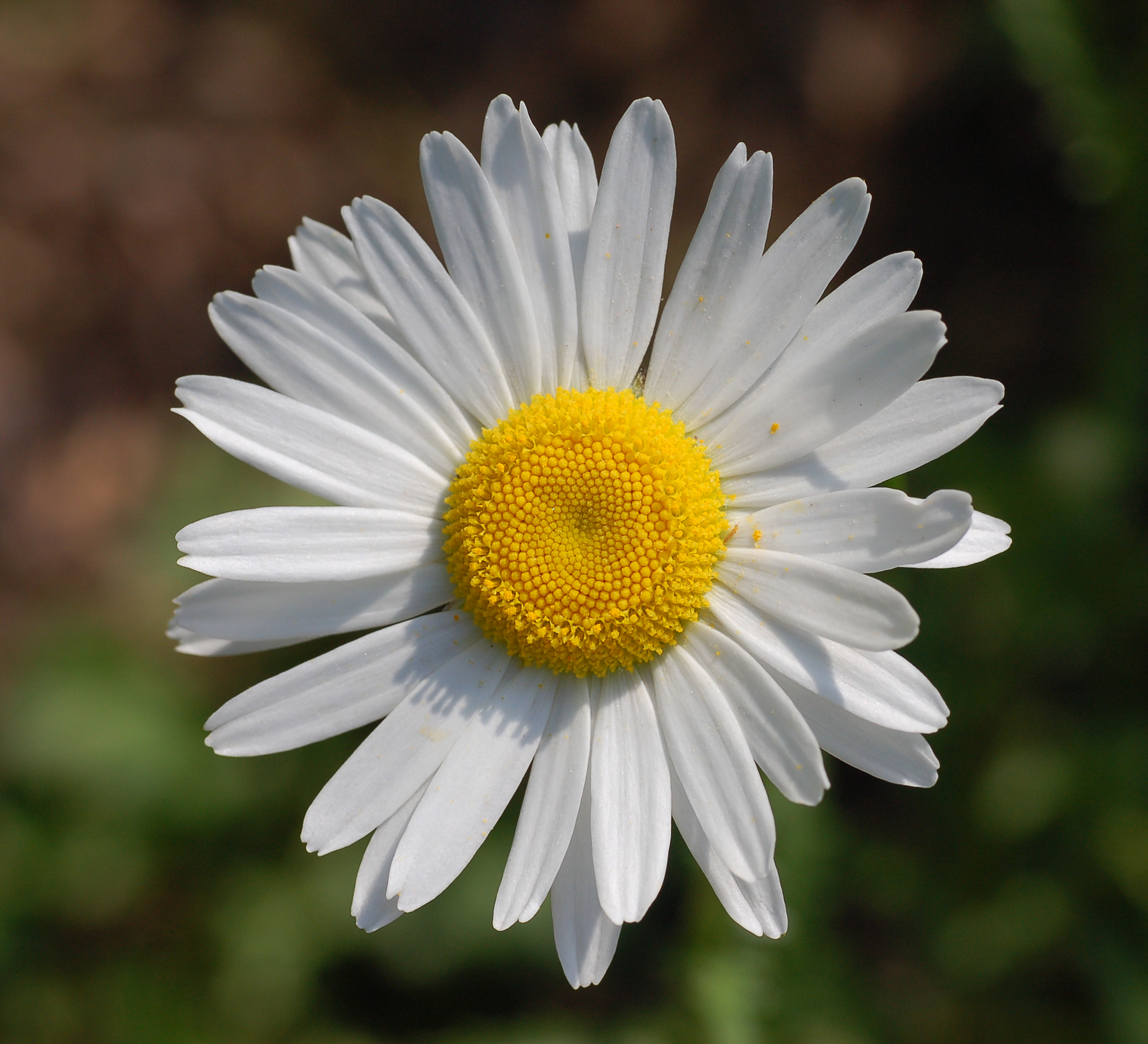
The symbol of Peter and Fevronia Day is a bouquet of daisies

== See also ==
- Saints Peter and Fevronia of Murom
- The Tales of Peter and Fevronia
- Christian views on marriage
- International Day of Families
- Valentine's Day
