= Muromsky (rural locality) =

Muromsky Муромский
- Settlement
- Location within Vladimir Oblast Location within Russia
- Coordinates: 55°33′N 42°01′E
- Country: Russia
- Region: Vladimir Oblast
- District: Muromsky District
- Time zone: UTC+3:00

Muromsky (Russian: Муромский) is a rural locality (a settlement) in Muromsky District, Vladimir Oblast, Russia. The population was 1,071 as of 2010. There are 6 streets.

== Geography ==
Muromsky is located 4 km southeast of Murom. Murom is the nearest rural locality.
