= Peter and Fevronia of Murom =

13th-century Russian saints

Saint Peter of Murom
- Saint Peter of Murom, painted by Alexander Prostev, circa 2008.

Right-Believing and Wonderworker
- Born: Davyd Yuryevich c. 1167; Principality of Murom
- Hometown: Murom, Russia
- Died: June 25, 1228 (aged 60–61); Principality of Murom
- Resting place: Murom, Russia
- Venerated in: Eastern Orthodox Church
- Canonized: 1547, Makaryev Monastery, Russia by Metropolitan Macarius of Moscow
- Major shrine: Holy Trinity Monastery, Murom, Russia
- Feast: 25 June (O.S.); 8 July (Sts. Peter and Fevronia Day), (N.S.); 6/19 September (Day of the Relics)
- Attributes: Crown; Sword; Dove; Scroll; Monastic habit
- Patronage: Family; Fidelity; Love; Marriage
- Prince of Murom
- Reign: 1203–1228
- Predecessor: Vladimir Yuryevich
- Successor: Yuri Davydovich
- Spouse: Fevronia of Murom
- Issue: Yuri Davydovich; Svyatoslav Davydovich; Evdokia Davydovna
- Dynasty: Rurik
- Father: Yuri I Vladimirovich
- Mother: Helena of Constantinople
- Religion: Eastern Orthodox

Saint Fevronia of Murom
- Saint Fevronia of Murom painted by Alexander Prostev, circa 2008.

Right-Believing and Wonderworker
- Born: Euphrosyne c. 1175; Village of Laskovo
- Hometown: Laskovo, Ryazan, Russia
- Died: June 25, 1228 (aged 52–53); Principality of Murom
- Resting place: Murom, Russia
- Venerated in: Eastern Orthodox Church
- Canonized: 1547, Makaryev Monastery, Nizhny Novgorod Oblast, Tsardom of Russia by Metropolitan Macarius of Moscow
- Major shrine: Holy Trinity Monastery, Murom, Russia
- Feast: 25 June (O.S.); 8 July (Sts. Peter and Fevronia Day), (N.S.); 6/19 September (Day of the Relics)
- Attributes: Crown; Cross; Dove; White daisy Monastic habit
- Patronage: Family; Fidelity; Love; Marriage
- Princess Consort of Murom
- Reign: 1203–1228
- Spouse: Peter of Murom
- Issue: Yuri Davydovich; Svyatoslav Davydovich; Evdokia Davydovna
- Dynasty: Rurik (by marriage)
- Religion: Eastern Orthodox

David Yuryevich (Russian: Давид Юрьевич; c. 1167 – 25 June 1228) and Euphrosyne (Russian: Евфросиния; c. 1175 – 25 June 1228), known as Saints Peter and Fevronia of Murom (Russian: Святые Пётр и Феврония Муромские), were the Russian prince and princess consort of the Principality of Murom. They are some of the most renowned Russian saints and wonderworkers venerated in the Russian Orthodox Church; having been canonized by Metropolitan Macarius of Moscow, their feast day is celebrated every year on 8 July [O.S. 25 June].

== Biography ==
According to legend, Davyd Yuryevich was the second son of Duke Yuri of Murom the Grand Prince of Kiev and his second wife Helena of Constantinople, grandson of Yaroslav I of Murom and Ryazan, the first Grand Prince of Ryazan. He ascended the throne in 1203 after the death of his elder brother Vladimir Yuryevich (according to his life, the Prince Peter assumed the prince's throne after the death of his elder brother, Prince Paul). During his reign, he acted supporting Vsevolod III the Grand Prince of Vladimir.

Some years before, Davyd was seriously ill with leprosy. Many doctors attempted to heal the prince; still, nobody could. During a vision, it had been revealed to the prince that the daughter of a bee keeper would be ready to heal him: the pious maiden Euphrosyne, a peasant from the rural Village of Laskovo in Ryazan Governorate. Euphrosyne was beautiful, pious and kind, moreover she was a wise woman, who knew the properties of herbs and knew how to treat ailments. Davyd fell in love with Euphrosyne for her piety, wisdom and kindness and made a vow to marry her after being healed; later the peasant healed the prince and became his wife. Euphrosyne then became the princess consort of Murom. Soon the couple had three children, they raised them using the fear of God. They ruled the city of Murom and lived happily as one family.

=== The war campaign ===
In 1207, Davyd Yuryevich came to the aid of Vsevolod Yuryevich during his campaign on the Ryazan Governorate land near Pronsk District. Pronsky Mikhail Vsevolodovich fled to Chernigov to his father in law Vsevolod Chermny. Residents led by Izyaslav, cousin of Mikhail Vsevolodovich, defended the city for six weeks, waiting for help from Ryazan, but experienced an acute shortage of food and water.

After an unsuccessful attempt at the unblocking strike of the Ryazan people, the city surrendered at the mercy of the winner. Izyaslav was released in peace, and instead of him Vsevolod gave Pronsk to his brother Prince Oleg Vladimirovich, who was among the besiegers. However, in the next year (1208) upon learning of his willfulness, Vsevolod took Pronsk from Oleg Vladimirovich and gave the city to Davyd. In the same year, Oleg and his brothers drove Davyd out of Pronsk and gave him to Mikhail.

In the struggle for the great reign of Vladimir after the death of Vsevolod III, Davyd supported Yuri and Yaroslav Vsevolodovich. In 1213, he participated in the campaign of Yuri Vsevolodovich against Rostov. In 1216, the Murom squad took part in the battle of Lipitsk as part of the combined forces of Vladimir, Pereyaslavl, Suzdal and some other estates on the side of Grand Duke Yuri Vsevolodovich, against the united army of Veliky Novgorod, Pskov, Smolensk, Toropets, Rostov.

In 1220 Davyd sent his son Svyatoslav with an army to take part in a joint campaign with the Vladimir people against the Volga Bulgars.

== Family ==
According to the Genealogy of Davyd and Euphrosyne, they had children. The names of the three children are known — Yuri, Svyatoslav and Evdokia. Along with this, the names of their four grandchildren are known: Yaroslav son of Yuri, Vasily and Ivan, sons of Svyatoslav, and Dmitry, son of Evdokia.

The fate of the children was different. The youngest son, Svyatoslav, died in the same week as his parents, only two to three days earlier. The eldest son, Yuri, died heroically in 1237 in the battle with Batu Khan, defending his native land.

The fate of Evdokia's daughter was marked by many signs of God's mercy. According to numerous sources, she married Svyatoslav, the son of Vsevolod III the Grand Duke of Vladimir and became Prince of Yuryevskaya. The chronicles mention that her father, Davyd the Prince of Murom was present at her wedding.

The Prince of Murom became directly related to the great family of the Prince of Vladimir, among whom there were many saints. One of them was Svyatoslav's mother, Maria Yasynya, who became famous for her love of children and piety. She gave birth to twelve children, after which her holy spouse began to be called Vsevolod III, having a large family. They raised their children in the fear of God and Christian piety. As a result, four of the sons are now canonized as saints by the Russian Orthodox Church.

The beneficial spiritual influence of Saint Mary on the princely couple of Svyatoslav and Evdokia was very visible. So, it is known that Evdokia had a son, Dmitry, who after his father became the Prince of Yurievsky (1253–1269). After their death, Svyatoslav and his son Yuri began to be revered as saints, which was noted in the old calendar. Now they are officially included in the Cathedral of Saint Vladimir.

Evdokia did not live long in marriage with her husband. In 1228, she begged her husband to let her go to the city of Murom in Borisoglebsk Monastery, where her parents asceticised, took monastic vows there after the death of her parents, and in the same year died after them and her younger brother.

== Death ==
Towards the end of their lives, Davyd and Euphrosyne took their vows and entered monastic life, Davyd taking the monastic name of Peter and Euphrosyne the name of Fevronia. According to the book of Kormchaia only the simultaneous cutting of spouses into monasticism could be regarded condescendingly as a reason for the dissolution of the marriage union. Both prayed that they would die the same day and their wish was fulfilled and they both died on Easter Sunday.

On 25 June 1228, they both died in their respective cells in monastery. The holy couple were buried at the Cathedral of the Nativity of the Blessed Virgin Mary in their homeland, Murom.

According to legends, they had expressed their desire to be buried together in the same coffin. Finding the burial in one coffin incompatible with the monastic rites, their bodies were placed in different coffins, but, by miracle the next day they were found together. This happened several times until their wish of being interred together was fulfilled. The simultaneous death of members of the Murom princely dynasty fell during the service in Murom, the Bishop of Murom and Ryazan, Bishop Yephrosyn Svyatogorets, who allegedly was the presider on the rite of the monastic tonsure of the holy couple, as well as their Christian burial.

== Canonization ==
In 1547, Metropolitan Macarius of Moscow canonized Peter and Fevronia as a saints in the Monastery of Makaryev and also the holy couple declared as the patron saint of Love and Marriage. After the Communist regime in Russia, the relics were rediscovered after being hidden in a Soviet Anti-religious Museum.

On 19 September 1992 the relic was enshrined in the Monastery of the Holy Trinity in the city of Murom, and every pilgrim can venerate to the saints and evoke their intercession.

== See also ==
- The Legend of the Invisible City of Kitezh and the Maiden Fevroniya
- The Tale of Peter and Fevronia
- Peter and Fevronia Day
- Monument to Peter and Fevronia
- List of Russian saints

== Literature ==
- Volodikhin D., Levina I. Peter and Fevronia. – Moscow: Mol. Guard, 2016. – 246 p. – (Life of wonderful people).
- Gumerov P. Was there a snake? Mysterious places "The Tale of Peter and Fevronia of Murom" (in Russian).
- Kuskov V.V. History of ancient Russian literature. – 7th ed. – Moscow: Higher. shk., 2003. – 336 p.
- Sporova E. Peter and Fevronia of Murom // Young artist. – 1988. – No. 12. – S. 13- 17.

== Sources ==
- "Петр, князь муромский" . Brockhaus and Efron Encyclopedic Dictionary (in Russian). 1906.
- "Феврония, супруга муромского князя" . Brockhaus and Efron Encyclopedic Dictionary (in Russian). 1906.
