= Nikologory =

Urban locality in Vladimir Oblast, Russia

Coordinates: 56°08′29″N 41°59′36″E

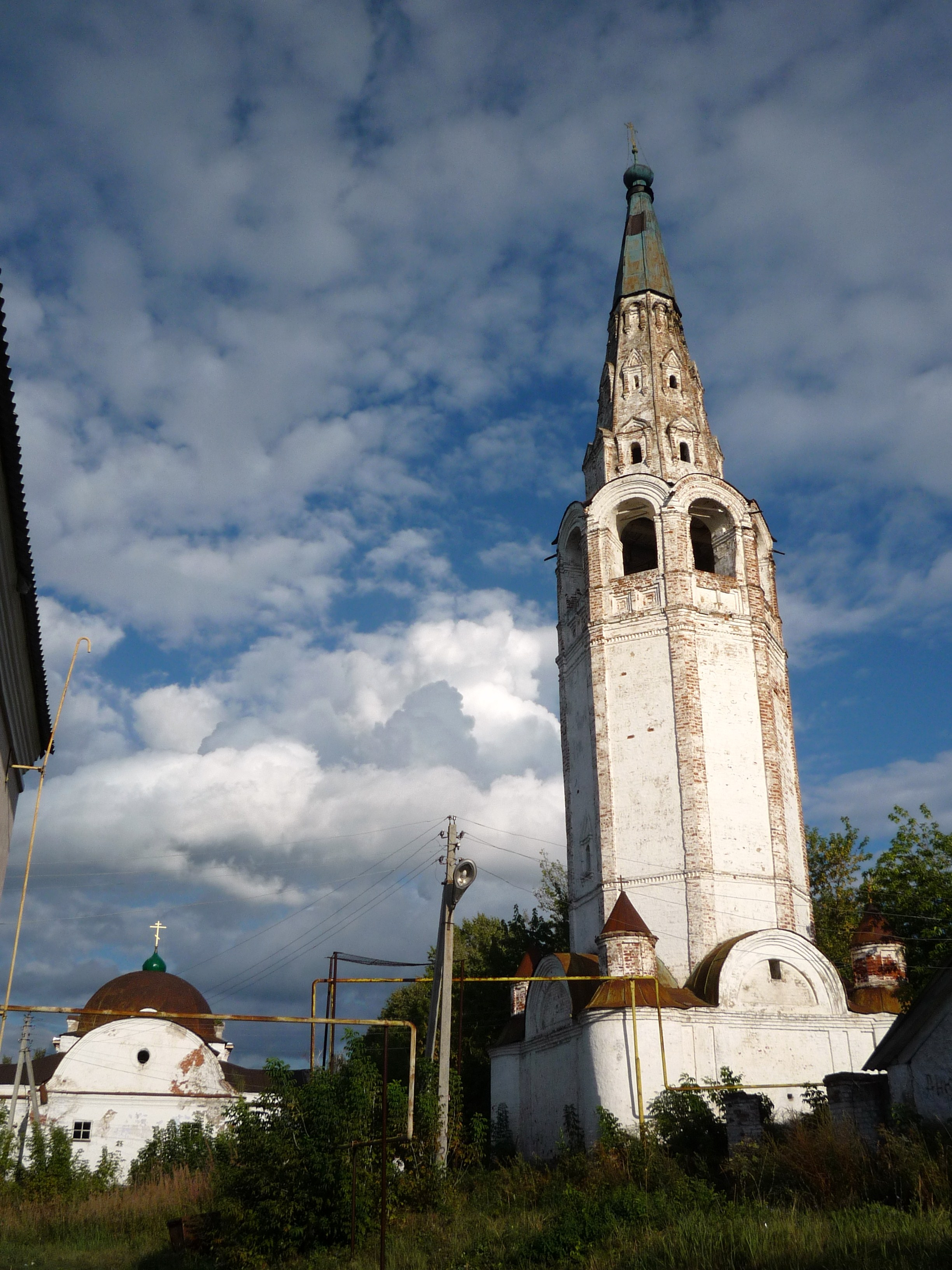
Nikologory

Nikologory (Russian: Николого́ры) is an urban-type settlement in Vyaznikovsky District of Vladimir Oblast, Russia. Population: 4,950 (2021 census); 5,486 (2010 census); 6,390 (2002 census); 6,782 (1989 Soviet census).
