= Balakirevo, Vladimir Oblast =

Urban locality in Vladimir Oblast, Russia

Coordinates: 56°30′30″N 38°50′37″E

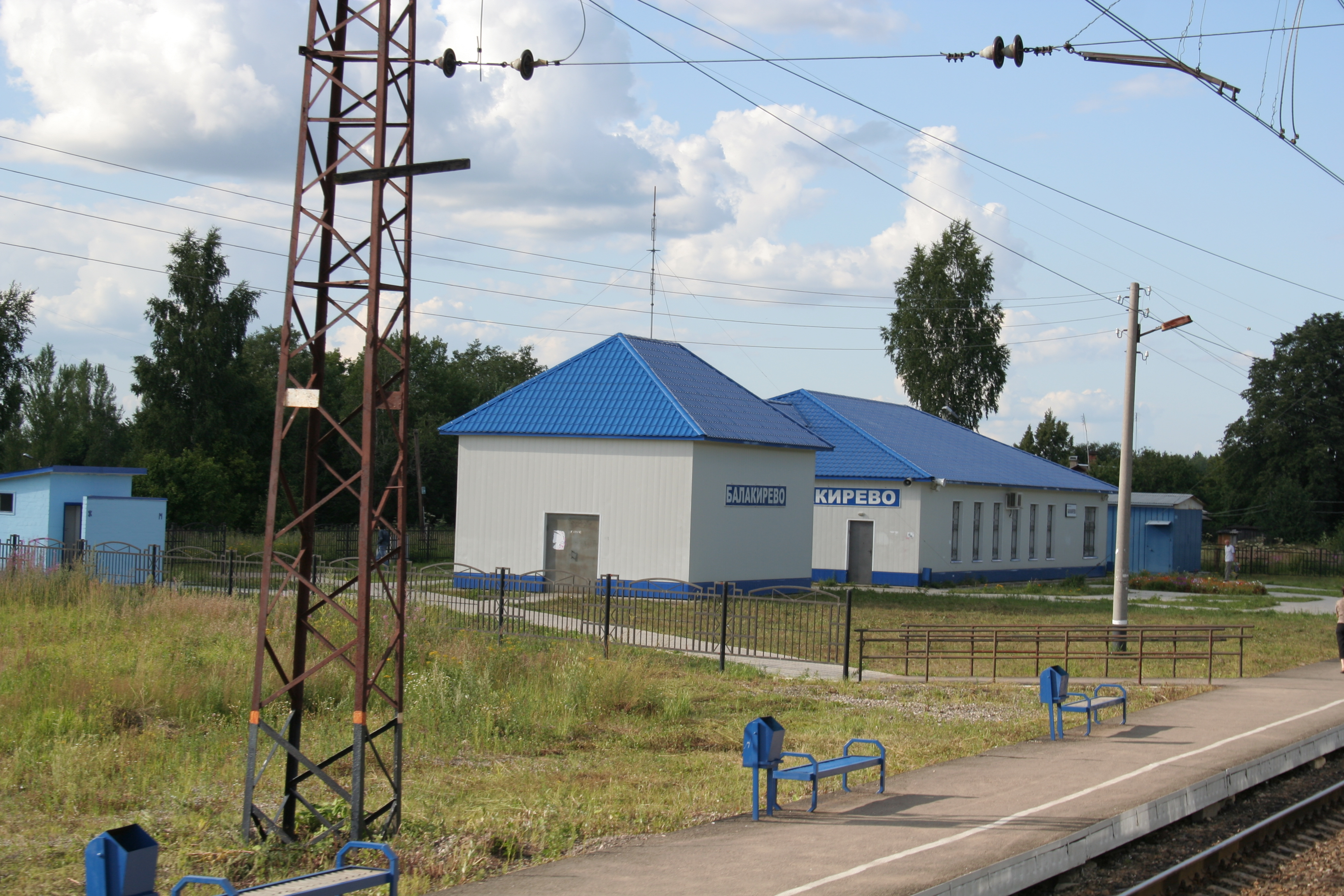
Balakirevo railway station

Balakirevo (Russian: Балакирево) is an urban-type settlement in Alexandrovsky District of Vladimir Oblast, Russia. Population: 9,474 (2021 census); 10,076 (2010 census); 9,141 (2002 census); 9,470 (1989 Soviet census).
