= Principality of Murom =

Russian principality (1127–1392)

Coordinates: 55°34′N 42°02′E

Principality of Murom Муромское княжество
- 1127–1392
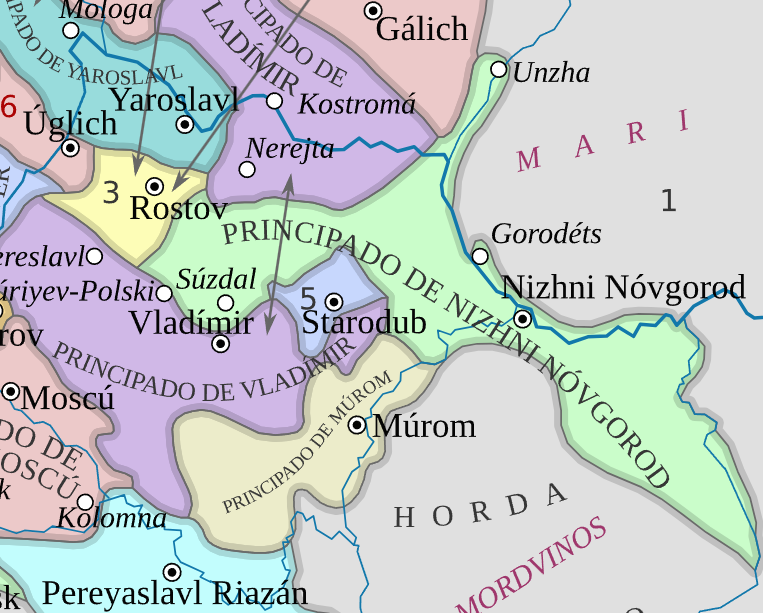
- Principality of Murom c. 1350
- Capital: Murom
- Common languages: Russian
- Religion: Russian Orthodoxy
- Government: Feudal monarchy
- Prince
  - 1097–1129 (first): Yaroslav Sviatoslavich
- History
  - Established: 1127
  - Disestablished: 1392
| Preceded by | Succeeded by |
| Kievan Rus' | Grand Principality of Moscow |

The Principality of Murom (Russian: Муромское княжество) was a Russian principality. Its capital was the city of Murom.

In 1127, it became a separate principality and was known as the Principality of Murom-Ryazan (Russian: Муромо-Рязанское княжество) until the mid-12th century. The Principality of Ryazan subsequently separated from it, and Murom was eventually incorporated into the Grand Principality of Moscow in 1392.

== History ==
=== Origins ===
Murom appears to have been an important Finnic settlement in the 9th century, with an archaeologically noticeable Scandinavian presence from the 10th century, as evidenced by Frankish swords, a tortoiseshell brooch and a sword chape. Slavic elements, particularly the Vyatichi, began to penetrate the region during the early Kievan period.

The Primary Chronicle alleges that Murom came under the control of the Rus' in the 9th century. Gleb Vladimirovich, son of Vladimir the Great, ruled the appanage principality of Murom in the early 11th century. In 1054, Yaroslav the Wise bequeathed the Principality of Chernigov to his second eldest surviving son, along with Murom and Ryazan. The principality was recognized as a family possession of Sviatoslav's sons. However, from 1077 to 1097, it changed hands seven times, usually alternating between Sviatoslav's sons and Vladimir Monomakh.

Following the Council of Liubech in 1097, Chernigov was given to Sviatoslav's sons: "Let each one hold his own patrimony (otchina) ... Let David, Oleg and Yaroslav [the three surviving sons of Svyatoslav] hold Svyatoslav's [patrimony]". Throughout the 12th century, the principality splintered. As the eldest son, Davyd held Chernigov, while Oleg made Novgorod-Seversk his capital. The youngest, Yaroslav, ruled in Murom and Ryazan from 1127. Following Yaroslav's death in 1129, his sons Sviatoslav and Rostislav received Murom and Ryazan, respectively. Murom-Ryazan remained in the possession of Yaroslav's descendants. The senior throne was Murom, while the junior was Ryazan. By the end of the 12th century, the family had split into two.

=== Later history ===
Following death of Vsevolod the Big Nest in 1212, the Principality of Ryazan became independent and its ruler adopted the title of grand prince. The prince of Murom, meanwhile, continued to be a firm ally of the grand prince of Vladimir. Murom was part of the southeastern border and therefore faced the brunt of attacks from the east. In 1220, a detachment from Murom was sent to aid the grand prince of Vladimir in his campaign against the Volga Bulgars. Following this, attacks by the Bulgars ceased. However, Murom was destroyed or at least devastated by the Mongol invasion of 1237–1238. Khan Batu came to the frontier of Ryazan in the winter of 1237, and demanded tribute from the princes of Ryazan, Murom and Pronsk. This was rejected, and devastation of these lands followed.

In 1257, the Mongols conducted a census, which began with "all the land of Suzdal", or all principalities subordinate to the grand prince of Vladimir, including Murom and Ryazan. The Murom principality carried on independently in relation to the Vladimir grand principality; however, it was ravaged during the campaign of Andrey Aleksandrovich in 1283, after he was confirmed as grand prince by Tode Mongke of the Golden Horde and given a Tatar army. Murom was again ravaged in 1293 by a combined Russo-Tatar army as a result of Dyuden's campaign.

By the early 14th century, the political situation in Murom had stabilized; however, Murom's economic position remained weak as there were still fears of Tatar raids. As a result, the Russian population did not settle the southeast banks of the Oka. During the reign of Yury Yaroslavich (1345–1355), Murom began to prosper again. In the spring of 1351, new buildings were constructed in the capital. However, the strengthening of Murom's position led Ivan II of Moscow to put forward Fyodor Glebovich as a contender to the throne of Murom in 1355. Due to the absence of Yury in the capital, some of the city's boyars sided with Fyodor. Both parties then visited the Horde; however, Jani Beg sided with Fyodor, who was given the patent to the throne. In 1377, the troops of Murom became part of the grand princely army on the order of Dmitry of Moscow. Murom participated in the Battle on Pyana River the same year; however, this defeat led to Murom's absence in the Battle of the Vozha River in 1378 and the Battle of Kulikovo in 1380.

In 1392, Vasily I of Moscow obtained a patent from Tokhtamysh authorizing the annexation of the Murom principality, along with the principalities of Nizhny Novgorod and Gorodets. The sources do not specify the exact legal grounds on which Vasily was granted the rights to the principality. According to a 1402 agreement between Vasily and Fyodor Olgovich of Ryazan, the territory on the left bank of the Oka, below the Tsna, belonged to Moscow. In an agreement between Vasily and Vladimir Andreyevich dating to 1404–1406, the latter recognized the former's territorial acquisitions, including Murom and its districts. It is possible that all senior representatives of the ruling family had died by the time of the annexation.

== Geography ==
The core territories of the principality were primarily concentrated along the tributaries of the Oka, as well as along the tributaries of the Klyazma. The Oka remained the main river for travel. In the second half of the 12th century, the principality was located between the Grand Principality of Vladimir and the Principality of Ryazan. It bordered the territory of Gorokhovets to the northwest and the Pra to the west.

== List of princes ==
- Yaroslav Sviatoslavich, 1097–1129
- Yury Yaroslavich, 1129–1143
- Sviatoslav Yaroslavich, 1143–1145
- Rostislav Yaroslavich, 1145–1147
- Vladimir Sviatoslavich, 1147–1149
- Rostislav Yaroslavich (again), 1149–1155
- Vladimir Sviatoslavich (again), 1155–1161
- Yury Vladimirovich, 1161–1174
- Vladimir Yuryevich, ?–1203
- Davyd Yuryevich, 1203–1228
- Yury Davydovich, ?–1237
- Igor Yuryevich, 1203–?
- Yaroslav Yuryevich, 1237–?

After Yaroslav and the destruction of Murom by the Mongols, the princes of Murom disappear for nearly a century, resuming with:

- Vasily Yaroslavich, ?–1344 x 8
- Yury Yaroslavich, 1344 x 8–1353
- Fyodor Glebovich, 1353–x 1392

== Sources ==
- Dimnik, Martin (12 June 2003). The Dynasty of Chernigov, 1146–1246. Cambridge University Press. ISBN 978-1-139-43684-7.
- Feldbrugge, Ferdinand J. M. (2 October 2017). A History of Russian Law: From Ancient Times to the Council Code (Ulozhenie) of Tsar Aleksei Mikhailovich of 1649. BRILL. ISBN 978-90-04-35214-8.
- Fennell, John (2014) [1983]. The Crisis of Medieval Russia, 1200–1304. Longman History of Russia. Routledge. ISBN 978-0-582-48150-3.
- Franklin, Simon; Shepard, Jonathan (6 June 2014). The Emergence of Rus 750-1200. Routledge. ISBN 978-1-317-87223-8.
- Kuzmin, A. V. (2013). "Муромское княжество" [Principality of Murom]. In Kravets, S. L. (ed.). Большая Российская энциклопедия. Том 21: Монголы — Наноматериалы (in Russian). Большая Российская энциклопедия. pp. 493–494. ISBN 978-5-85270-355-2.
