= Prince of Murom =

Monarch during a period of Russian history

The Prince of Murom (Russian: князь муромский) was the title of the ruler of the Principality of Murom.

== History ==
Gleb Vladimirovich, son of Vladimir the Great, ruled the principality in the early 11th century. Murom was part of the territory of the Principality of Chernigov in the late 11th century, controlled by the Sviatoslavichi, the descendants of Yaroslav the Wise; probably it was retained by Vsevolod Yaroslavich, even after this prince of Chernigov became the grand prince in 1076.

Oleg Sviatoslavich, a grandson of Yaroslav and the prince of Chernigov, ruled Murom through a posadnik in the early 1090s, and it was recognised as Oleg's sphere of influence at the Liubech Conference of 1097. Here Oleg's brother Davyd was made co-ruler of Chernigov, and Oleg's lands were parcelled out between Oleg, Davyd and their brother Yaroslav; the latter obtained Ryazan and Murom.

In 1392, Vasily I, the grand prince of Vladimir and Moscow, obtained a patent from Khan Tokhtamysh authorising the annexation of the Murom principality, along with those of Nizhny Novgorod and Gorodets.

== List of princes ==
- Iaroslav Sviatoslavich, 1097–1129
- Iurii Iaroslavich, 1129–1143
- Sviatoslav Iaroslavich, 1143–1145
- Rostislav Iaroslavich, 1145–1147
- Vladimir Sviatoslavich, 1147–1149
- Rostislav Iaroslavich (again), 1149–1155
- Vladimir Sviatoslavich (again), 1155–1161
- Iurii Vladimirovich, 1161–1174 ru:Юрий Владимирович (князь муромский)
- Vladimir Yuryevich, ?–1203
- Davyd Yuryevich, 1203–1228
- Iurii Davydovich, ?–1237
- Igor Yuryevich, 1203–?
- Iaroslav Yuryevich, 1237–?

After Iaroslav and the destruction of Murom by the Mongols, the princes of Murom disappeared for nearly a century, resuming with:

- Vasily Iaroslavich, ?–1344 x 8
- Iurii Iaroslavich, 1344 x 8–1353
- Fedor Glebovich, 1353–x 1392

== Bibliography ==
- Dimnik, Martin, The Dynasty of Chernigov, 1146–1246, (Cambridge, 2003)
- Franklin, Simon, and Shepard, Jonathan, The Emergence of Rus, 750–1200, (Longman History of Russia, Harlow, 1996)
- Martin, Janet, Medieval Russia, 980–1584, (Cambridge, 1995)
