= Kurlovo (rural locality), Vladimir Oblast =

Kurlovo Курлово
- Village
- Location within Vladimir Oblast Location within Russia
- Coordinates: 55°25′N 40°29′E
- Country: Russia
- Region: Vladimir Oblast
- District: Gus-Khrustalny District
- Time zone: UTC+3:00

Kurlovo (Russian: Курлово) is a rural locality (a village) in Demidovskoye Rural Settlement, Gus-Khrustalny District, Vladimir Oblast, Russia. The population was 2 as of 2010.

== Geography ==
The village is located 15 km east from Demidovo, 39 km south from Gus-Khrustalny.
