= Lakinsk =

Lakinsk Лакинск
- Town
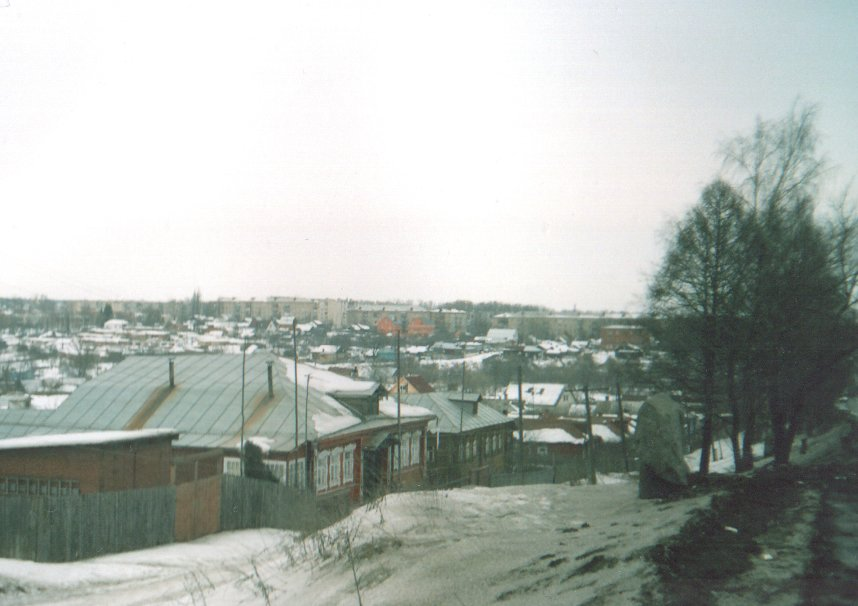
- View of Lakinsk

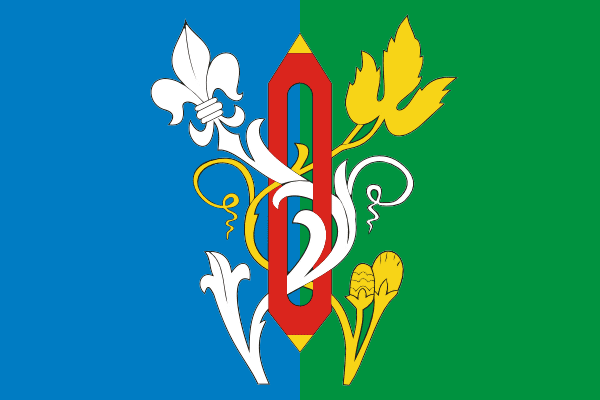
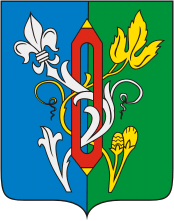
- Flag Coat of arms
- Interactive map of Lakinsk
- Location of Lakinsk Lakinsk (Vladimir Oblast)
- Coordinates: 56°02′N 39°58′E
- Country: Russia
- Federal subject: Vladimir Oblast
- Administrative district: Sobinsky District
- Known since: the end of the 15th century
- Town status since: 1969
- Elevation: 120 m (390 ft)

Population (2010 Census)
  - Total: 15,715
  - Estimate (2021): 12,861 (−18.2%)

Municipal status
  - Municipal district: Sobinsky Municipal District
  - Urban settlement: Lakinsk Urban Settlement
  - Capital of: Lakinsk Urban Settlement
- Time zone: UTC+3 (MSK)
- Postal code: 601240
- OKTMO ID: 17650110001
- Website: www.lakinskmo.ru

Lakinsk (Russian: Ла́кинск) is a town in Sobinsky District of Vladimir Oblast, Russia, located on the left bank of the Klyazma River, 32 kilometers (20 mi) southwest of Vladimir, the administrative center of the oblast. Population: 12,861 (2021 census); 15,715 (2010 census); 17,086 (2002 census); 18,918 (1989 Soviet census).

== History ==
It grew out of the village of Undol (Ундол), which was in the same area as the modern town and has been documented since at least the end of the 15th century. In 1889, a spinning-and-weaving factory was opened near the village. As the factory developed, the village also grew. In 1927, Undol was granted work settlement status and renamed Lakinsky (Лакинский) after the local party leader. It was granted town status and renamed Lakinsk in 1969.

== Administrative and municipal status ==
Within the framework of administrative divisions, Lakinsk is directly subordinated to Sobinsky District. As a municipal division, the town of Lakinsk is incorporated within Sobinsky Municipal District as Lakinsk Urban Settlement.

=== Sources ===
- Администрация Владимирской области. Постановление №433 от 13 июня 2007 г. «О реестре административно-территориальных образований и единиц Владимирской области», в ред. Постановления №169 от 5 марта 2015 г. «О внесении изменения в Постановление Губернатора области от 13.06.2007 №433 "О реестре административно-территориальных образований и единиц Владимирской области"». Вступил в силу со дня официального опубликования. Опубликован: "Владимирские ведомости", №114, 20 июня 2007 г. (Administration of Vladimir Oblast. Resolution #433 of June 13, 2007 On the Registry of the Administrative-Territorial Formations and Units of Vladimir Oblast, as amended by the Resolution #169 of March 5, 2015 On Amending Resolution #433 of the Oblast Governor of June 13, 2007 "On the Registry of the Administrative-Territorial Formations and Units of Vladimir Oblast". Effective as of the day of the official publication.).
- Законодательное Собрание Владимирской области. Закон №38-ОЗ от 6 мая 2005 г. «О наделении Собинского района и муниципальных образований, входящих в его состав, соответствующим статусом муниципальных образований и установлении их границ», в ред. Закона №25-ОЗ от 27 апреля 2011 г. «О внесении изменений в Приложения к Закону Владимирской области "О наделении Собинского района и муниципальных образований, входящих в его состав, соответствующим статусом муниципальных образований и установлении их границ"». Вступил в силу со дня официального опубликования (25 мая 2005 г.). Опубликован: "Владимирские ведомости", №171, 25 мая 2005 г. (Legislative Assembly of Vladimir Oblast. Law #38-OZ of May 6, 2005 On Granting Sobinsky District and the Municipal Formations Comprising It an Appropriate Status of the Municipal Formations and on Establishing Their Borders, as amended by the Law #25-OZ of April 27, 2011 On Amending the Appendices to the Law of Vladimir Oblast "On Granting Sobinsky District and the Municipal Formations Comprising It an Appropriate Status of the Municipal Formations and on Establishing Their Borders". Effective as of the day of the official publication (May 25, 2005).).
