= Volginsky =

Urban locality in Vladimir Oblast, Russia

Coordinates: 55°56′58″N 39°14′31″E

Volginsky (Russian: Вольгинский) is an urban-type settlement in Petushinsky District of Vladimir Oblast, Russia. Population: 5,494 (2021 census); 6,089 (2010 census); 6,295 (2002 census); 6,104 (1989 Soviet census).
