= Stavrovo, Sobinsky District, Vladimir Oblast =

Urban locality in Vladimir Oblast, Russia

Coordinates: 56°07′48″N 40°00′23″E

Stavrovo (Russian: Ставро́во) is an urban-type settlement in Sobinsky District of Vladimir Oblast, Russia. Population: 6,932 (2021 census); 7,800 (2010 census); 8,005 (2002 census); 7,985 (1989 Soviet census).
