= Kurlovo (town), Vladimir Oblast =

Town in Vladimir Oblast, Russia

Kurlovo Курлово
- Town
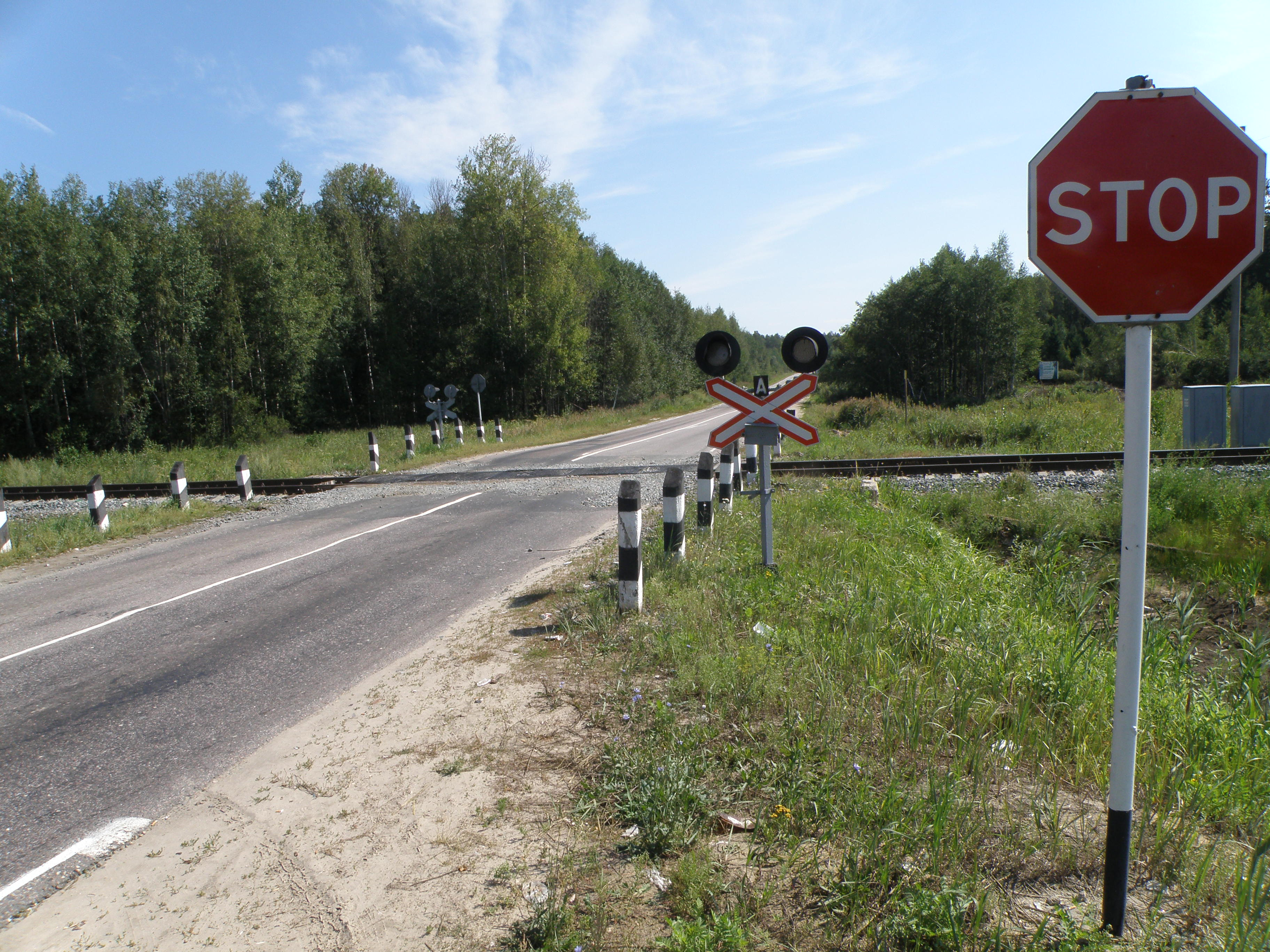
- Railway cross

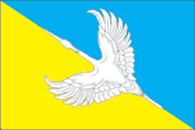
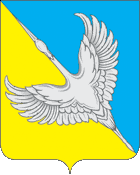
- Flag Coat of arms
- Interactive map of Kurlovo
- Location of Kurlovo Kurlovo (Vladimir Oblast)
- Coordinates: 55°27′N 40°39′E
- Country: Russia
- Federal subject: Vladimir Oblast
- Administrative district: Gus-Khrustalny District
- Founded: 1811
- Town status since: 1998
- Elevation: 130 m (430 ft)

Population (2010 Census)
  - Total: 6,764
  - Estimate (2021): 6,309 (−6.7%)

Municipal status
  - Municipal district: Gus-Khrustalny Municipal District
  - Urban settlement: Kurlovo Urban Settlement
  - Capital of: Kurlovo Urban Settlement
- Time zone: UTC+3 (MSK)
- Postal code: 601570
- OKTMO ID: 17620115001
- Website: kurlovo-city.ru

Kurlovo (Russian: Курлово) is a town in Gus-Khrustalny District of Vladimir Oblast, Russia, located 80 kilometers (50 mi) south of Vladimir, the administrative center of the oblast. Population:6,309 (2021 census); 6,764 (2010 census); 7,433 (2002 census).

== History ==
It was founded in 1811 as a settlement near a glass factory and was originally called Kurlovsky (Курловский). It was granted urban-type settlement status in 1927 and town status in 1998, at which time it was also given its present name.

== Administrative and municipal status ==
Within the framework of administrative divisions, Kurlovo is directly subordinated to Gus-Khrustalny District. As a municipal division, the town of Kurlovo is incorporated within Gus-Khrustalny Municipal District as Kurlovo Urban Settlement.
