= Murom Urban Okrug =

- District
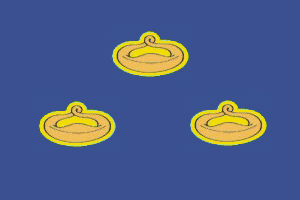
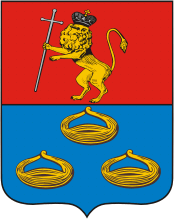
- Flag Coat of arms
- Coordinates: 55°34′21″N 42°03′05″E
- Country: Russia
- Federal subject: Mandatory parameter. Please, specify
- Established: 11 December 2001
- Administrative center: Murom
- Time zone: UTC+3 (MSK)
- OKTMO ID: 17735000

Murom Urban Okrug (Russian: городско́й о́круг Му́ром) is a municipal formation (an urban okrug) in Vladimir Oblast, Russia, one of the five urban okrugs in the oblast. Its territory covers the territories of two administrative divisions of Vladimir Oblast—the whole of the City of Murom and nine rural localities in Muromsky District.

The municipal formation previously established within the borders of the City of Murom was granted urban okrug status by the Law #179-OZ of November 11, 2004. By the Law #53-OZ of Vladimir Oblast of May 11, 2005, the borders of the urban okrug were changed to include nine rural localities of Muromsky District.
