= Muromsky District =

Muromsky District Муромский район (Russian)
- District
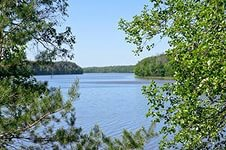
- Visha Lake, Muromsky District

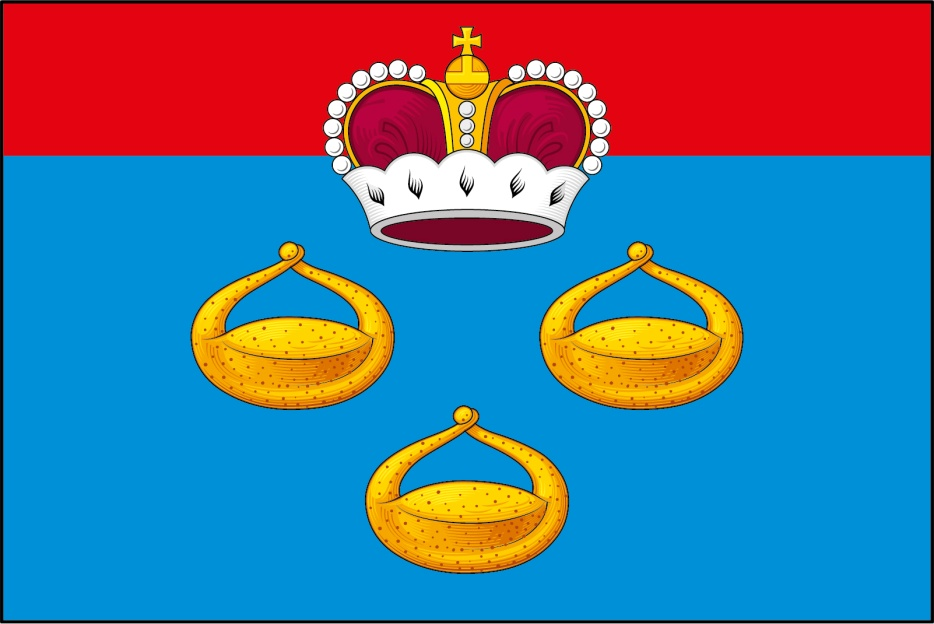
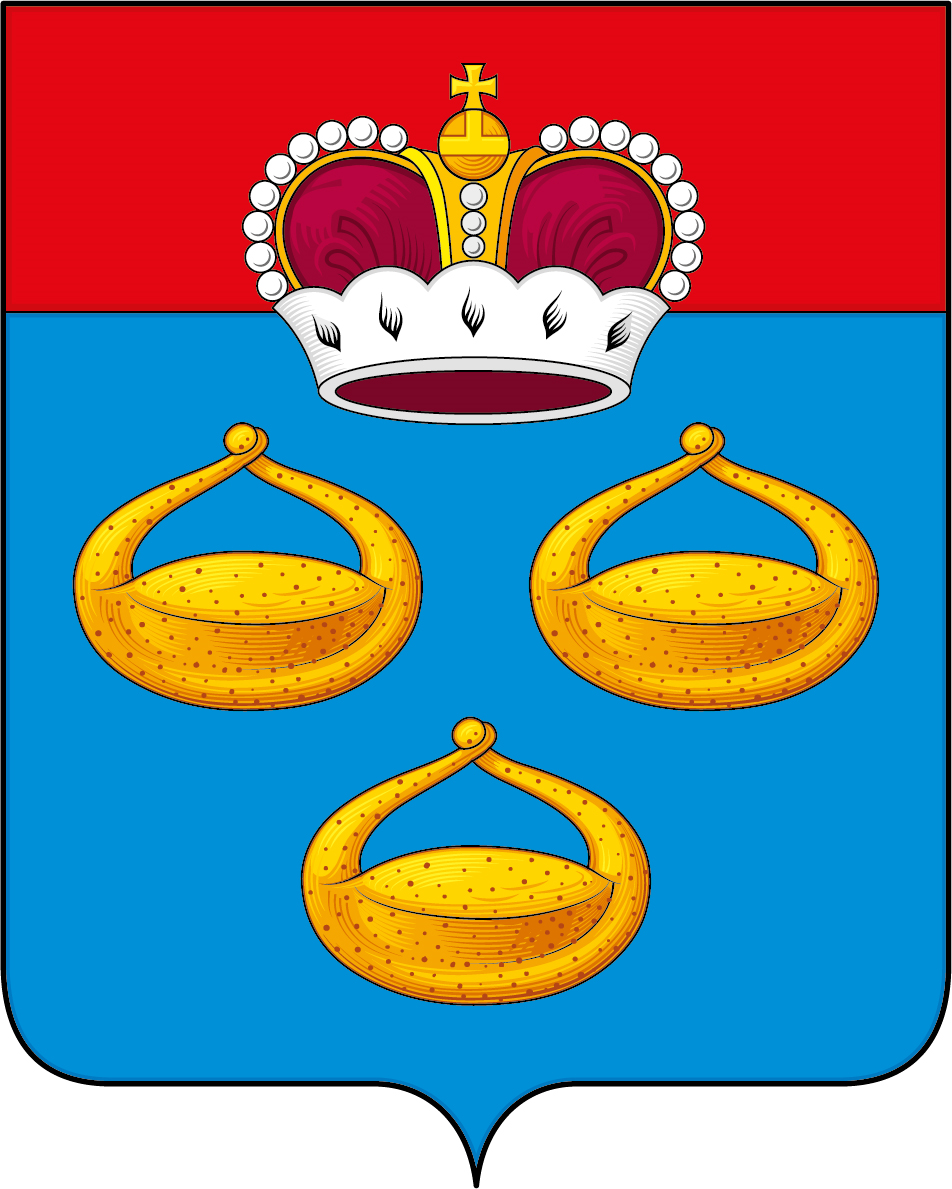
- Flag Coat of arms
- Location of Muromsky District in Vladimir Oblast
- Coordinates: 55°34′N 42°02′E
- Country: Russia
- Federal subject: Vladimir Oblast
- Established: 14 January 1929
- Administrative center: Murom

Area
  - Total: 1,050 km^{2} (410 sq mi)

Population (2010 Census)
  - Total: 24,991
  - Density: 23.8/km^{2} (61.6/sq mi)
  - Urban: 0%
  - Rural: 100%

Administrative structure
  - Inhabited localities: 99 rural localities

Municipal structure
  - Municipally incorporated as: Muromsky Municipal District
  - Municipal divisions: 0 urban settlements, 2 rural settlements
- Time zone: UTC+3 (MSK)
- OKTMO ID: 17644000
- Website: http://www.muromraion.ru

Muromsky District (Russian: Му́ромский райо́н) is an administrative and municipal district (raion), one of the sixteen in Vladimir Oblast, Russia. It is located in the east of the oblast. The area of the district is 1,050 square kilometers (410 sq mi). Its administrative center is the city of Murom (which is not administratively a part of the district). Population: 15,013 (2021 census); 24,991 (2010 census); 26,382 (2002 Census); 29,975 (1989 Soviet census).

== Administrative and municipal status ==
Within the framework of administrative divisions, Muromsky District is one of the sixteen in the oblast. The city of Murom serves as its administrative center, despite being incorporated separately as an administrative unit with the status equal to that of the districts.

As a municipal division, the territory of the district is split between two municipal formations—Murom Urban Okrug, to which nine of the administrative district's rural localities belong, and Muromsky Municipal District, which covers the rest of the administrative district's territory.
