= Murom =

City in Vladimir Oblast, Russia

Murom Муром
- City
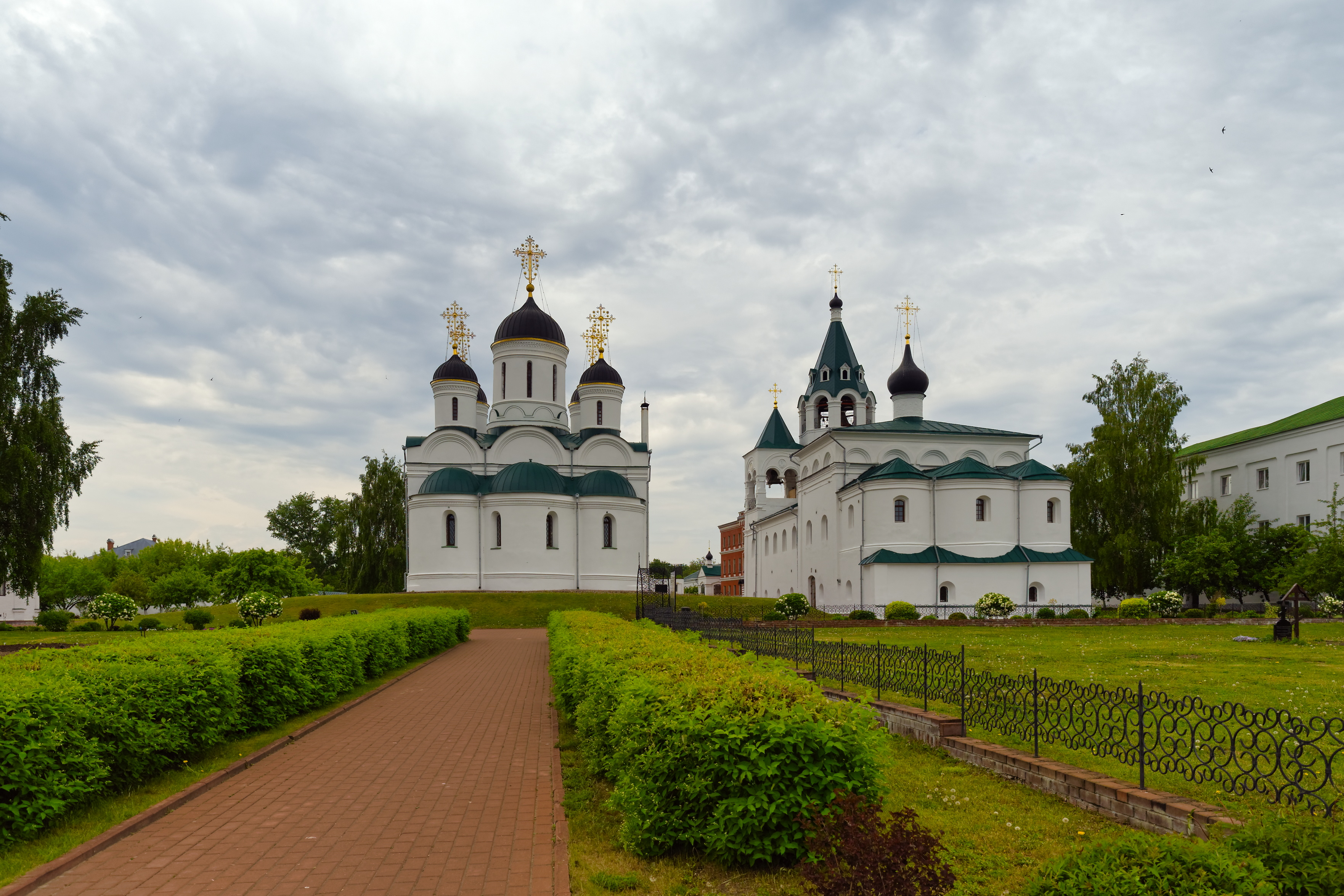
- Murom Transfiguration monastery

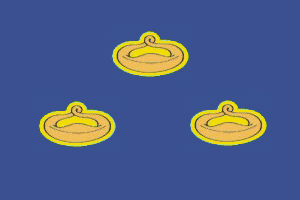
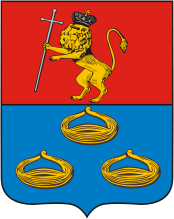
- Flag Coat of arms
- Interactive map of Murom
- Location of Murom Murom (Vladimir Oblast)
- Coordinates: 55°34′N 42°02′E
- Country: Russia
- Federal subject: Vladimir Oblast
- First mentioned: 862

Government
  - Head: Yevgeny Rychkov
- Elevation: 115 m (377 ft)

Population (2010 Census)
  - Total: 116,075
  - Estimate (2025): 104,078 (−10.3%)
  - Rank: 140th in 2010

Administrative status
  - Subordinated to: City of Murom
  - Capital of: Muromsky District, City of Murom

Municipal status
  - Urban okrug: Murom Urban Okrug
  - Capital of: Murom Urban Okrug, Muromsky Municipal District
- Time zone: UTC+3 (MSK)
- Postal code: 602250
- Dialing code: +7 49234
- OKTMO ID: 17735000001
- Website: www.murom.info

Murom (Russian: Муром, IPA: [ˈmurəm]) is a historical city in Vladimir Oblast, Russia, which sprawls along the west bank of the Oka River. It borders Nizhny Novgorod Oblast and is situated 137 kilometres (85 mi) from the administrative center Vladimir. Its population as of the 2021 census was 107,497.

First mentioned in 862, it is one of the oldest cities in Russia. It was the center of the Principality of Murom during the Middle Ages.

== Etymology ==
The name of the city is derived from the Muroma, a Finnic tribe that inhabited the area.

== History ==
=== Middle Ages ===
In the 9th century, the city marked the easternmost settlement of the East Slavs in the land of the Muroma, a Finnic tribe. The Primary Chronicle mentions it as early as 862. It is, thus, one of the oldest cities in Russia. Around 900, it was an important trading post from Volga Bulgaria to the Baltic Sea.

Between 1010 and 1392, it was the capital of a separate principality, whose rulers included the saints Gleb, assassinated in 1015 and canonized in 1071, Konstantin the Blessed, and Peter and Fevronia of Murom, subjects of an opera by Rimsky-Korsakov. It was believed to be the home town of the Russian epic hero Ilya Muromets. The town has a statue which shows Ilya holding the hilt of his sword in the left hand and a cross in the right.

Along with the Principality of Ryazan, Murom bore the brunt of attacks from the east as it constituted the southeastern border of Russia. As a result, Murom became dependent on the other Russian principalities. Vasily I of Moscow received the patent for the throne of Murom in 1392 and it was incorporated into the Grand Principality of Moscow.

=== Recent history ===
On June 30, 1961, Murom was the site of a spontaneous protest and riot against the police and Soviet authorities, following the death in police custody of a senior factory foreman named Kostikov.

== Administrative and municipal status ==
Within the framework of administrative divisions, Murom serves as the administrative center of Muromsky District, even though it is not a part of it. As an administrative division, it is incorporated separately as the City of Murom — an administrative unit with the status equal to that of the districts. As a municipal division, the territory of the City of Murom together with nine rural localities in Muromsky District are incorporated as Murom Urban Okrug.

== Economy ==
Murom has since 1941 played host to the JSC Murom instrument making plant (MIMP) which produces the means of initiation and ignition of ammunition, as well as various pyrotechnic devices. It is a subsidiary of Rostec State Corporation.

== Sights ==
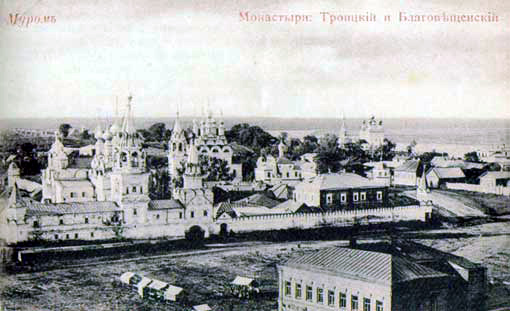
Three historic abbeys in the city center

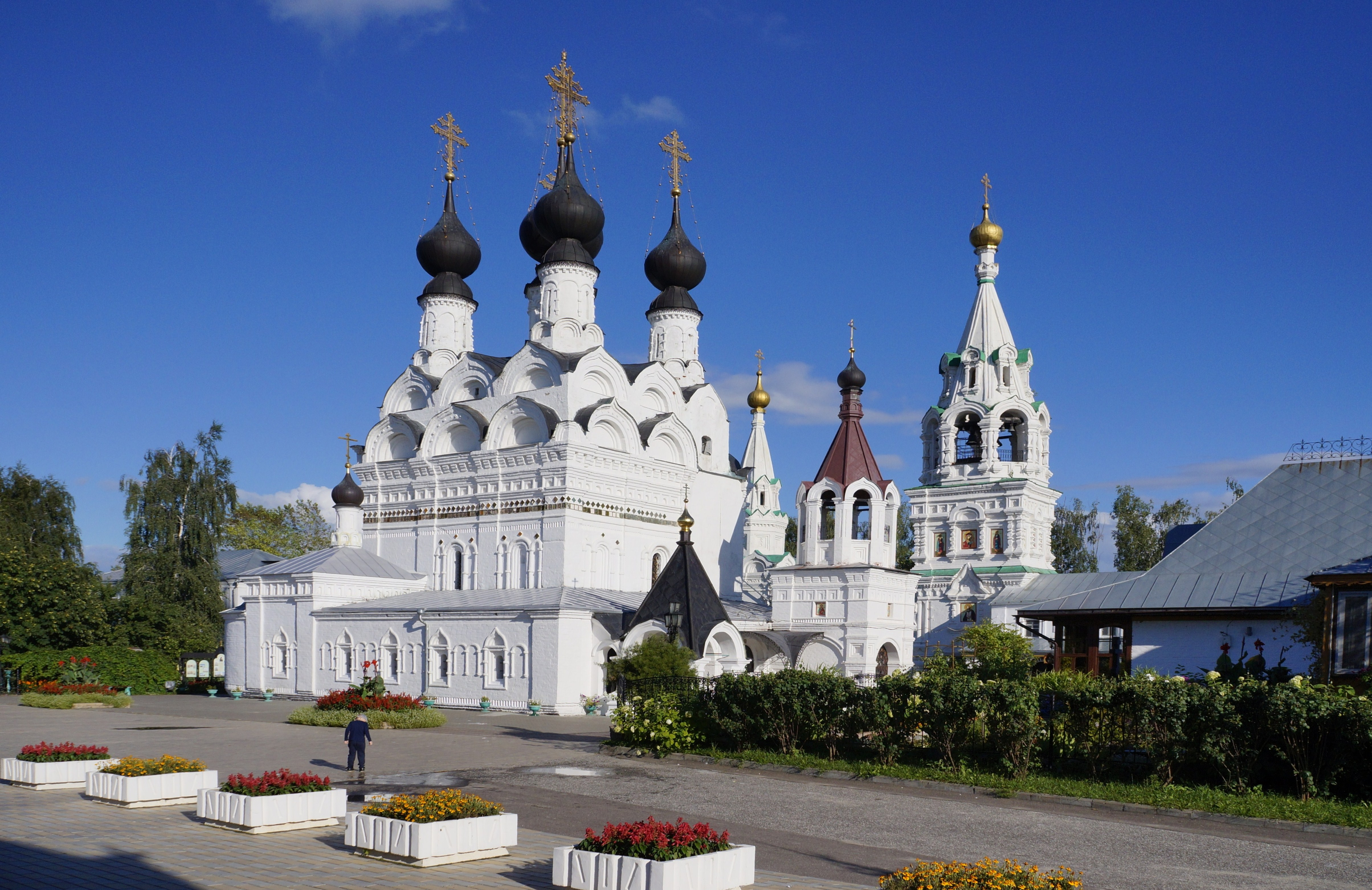
The main church of the Holy Trinity Monastery (1642–1643)

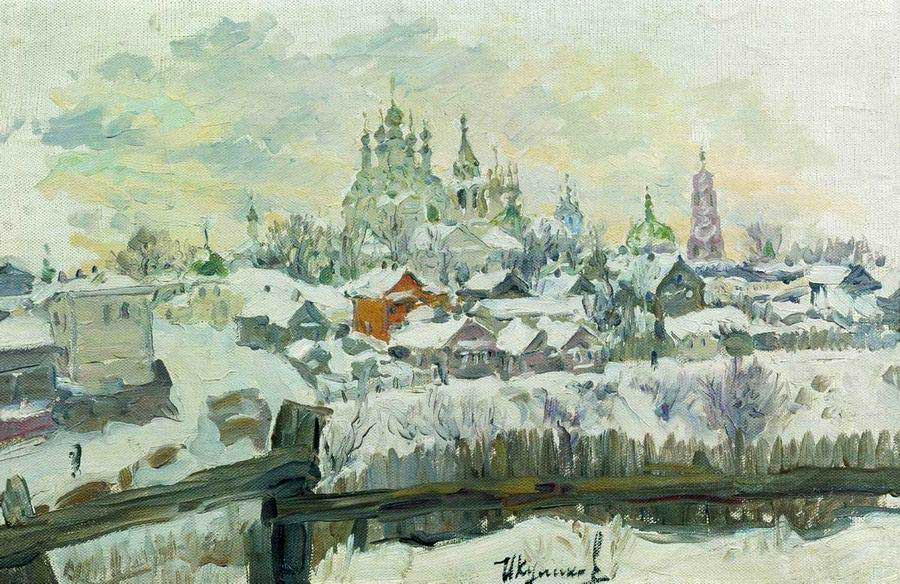
Painting by Ivan Kulikov 1914

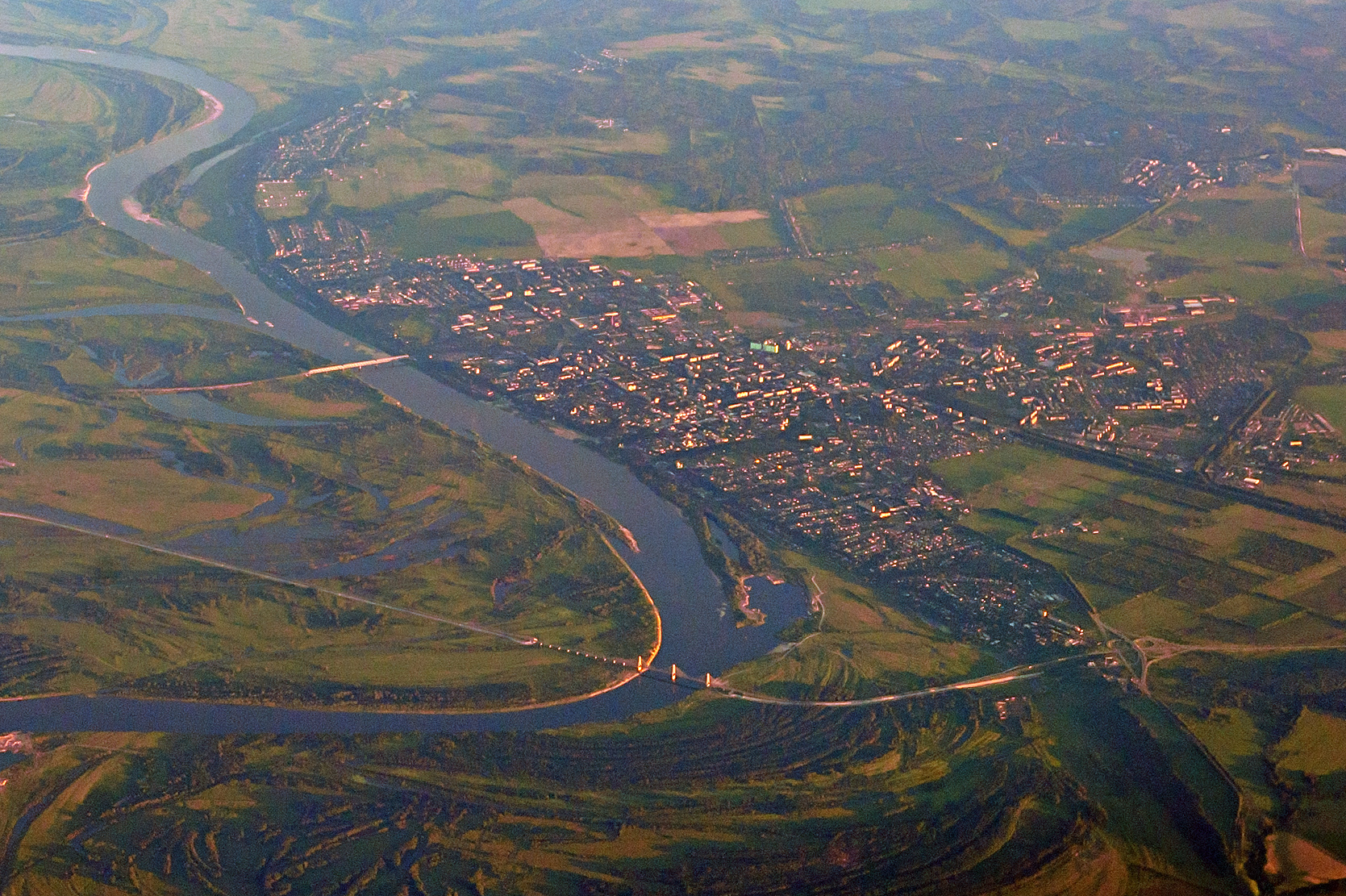
Aerial view of the city in 2014

Murom still retains many marks of antiquity. The Transfiguration Monastery, one of the most ancient in Russia, was first chronicled in 1096, when Oleg of Chernigov besieged it and killed Vladimir Monomakh's son Izyaslav, who is buried there. In 1552, the monastery was visited by Ivan the Terrible who commissioned a stone cathedral, which was followed by other churches.

The Trinity Convent, where the relics of Sts. Peter and Fevronia are displayed, features a fine cathedral (1642–1643), the Kazan Church (1652), a bell-tower (1652), a wooden church of St. Sergius, and stone walls. It is rivaled by the Annunciation Monastery, founded during the reign of Ivan the Terrible to house the relics of local princes and containing a cathedral from 1664. Two last-mentioned cathedrals, being probably the works of the same masters, have much in common with the Resurrection Church (1658) in the downtown. The tent-like church of Sts. Cosmas and Damian was built in 1565 on the bank of the Oka to commemorate the Russian conquest of Kazan.

== International relations ==
Murom is twinned with:

- Babruysk, Belarus

== Notable people ==
- Igor Irodov (1923–2002), physicist;
- Ivan Kulikov (1875–1941), painter;
- Sergey Prokudin-Gorsky (1863–1944), chemist and photographer;
- Vladimir K. Zworykin (1888–1982), inventor;
- GORILLA GLUE (2002-), rapper.
