= Dolbino, Vladimir Oblast =

Dolbino Долбино
- Village
- Location within Vladimir Oblast Location within Russia
- Coordinates: 55°18′N 41°06′E
- Country: Russia
- Region: Vladimir Oblast
- District: Gus-Khrustalny District
- Time zone: UTC+3:00

Dolbino (Russian: Долбино) is a rural locality (a village) in Kupreyevskoye Rural Settlement, Gus-Khrustalny District, Vladimir Oblast, Russia. The population was 323 as of 2010.

== Geography ==
Dolbino is located 64 km southeast of Gus-Khrustalny (the district's administrative centre) by road. Novo-Durovo is the nearest rural locality.
