= Dudor =

Dudor Дудор
- Village
- Location within Vladimir Oblast Location within Russia
- Coordinates: 55°31′58″N 40°54′18″E
- Country: Russia
- Region: Vladimir Oblast
- District: Gus-Khrustalny District
- Time zone: UTC+3:00

Dudor (Russian: Дудор) is a rural locality (a village) in Gus-Khrustalny District, Grigoryevskoye Rural Settlement, Vladimir Oblast, Russia. The population was 59 as of 2010.

== Geography ==
Dudor is located 28 km southeast of Gus-Khrustalny (the district's administrative centre) by road. Dmitriyevo is the nearest rural locality.
