= Sintsovo =

Sintsovo Синцово
- Village
- Location within Vladimir Oblast Location within Russia
- Coordinates: 55°35′N 40°15′E
- Country: Russia
- Region: Vladimir Oblast
- District: Gus-Khrustalny District
- Time zone: UTC+3:00

Sintsovo (Russian: Синцово) is a rural locality (a village) in Posyolok Urshelsky, Gus-Khrustalny District, Vladimir Oblast, Russia. The population was 20 as of 2010.

== Geography ==
Sintsovo is located 30 km west of Gus-Khrustalny (the district's administrative centre) by road. Vasilevo is the nearest rural locality.
