= Chersevo =

Chersevo Черсево
- Selo
- Location within Vladimir Oblast Location within Russia
- Coordinates: 55°24′N 41°05′E
- Country: Russia
- Region: Vladimir Oblast
- District: Gus-Khrustalny District
- Time zone: UTC+3:00

Chersevo (Russian: Черсево) is a rural locality (a selo) in Posyolok Zolotkovo, Gus-Khrustalny District, Vladimir Oblast, Russia. The population was 240 as of 2010.

== Geography ==
Chersevo is located on the Kolp River, 69 km southeast of Gus-Khrustalny (the district's administrative centre) by road. Ikshevo is the nearest rural locality.
