= Gavrino =

Gavrino Гаврино
- Settlement
- Location within Vladimir Oblast Location within Russia
- Coordinates: 55°49′N 40°30′E
- Country: Russia
- Region: Vladimir Oblast
- District: Gus-Khrustalny District
- Time zone: UTC+3:00

Gavrino (Russian: Гаврино) is a rural locality (a settlement) in Posyolok Ivanishchi, Gus-Khrustalny District, Vladimir Oblast, Russia. The population was 58 as of 2010.

== Geography ==
Gavrino is located 40 km north of Gus-Khrustalny (the district's administrative centre) by road. Neklyudovo is the nearest rural locality.
