= Dubasovo =

Dubasovo Дубасово
- Selo
- Location within Vladimir Oblast Location within Russia
- Coordinates: 55°46′N 40°50′E
- Country: Russia
- Region: Vladimir Oblast
- District: Gus-Khrustalny District
- Time zone: UTC+3:00

Dubasovo (Russian: Дубасово) is a rural locality (a selo) in Posyolok Krasnoye Ekho, Gus-Khrustalny District, Vladimir Oblast, Russia. The population was 272 as of 2010.

== Geography ==
Dubasovo is located 36 km northeast of Gus-Khrustalny (the district's administrative centre) by road. Bolshaya Artemovka is the nearest rural locality.
