= Izbishchi =

Izbishchi Избищи
- Village
- Location within Vladimir Oblast Location within Russia
- Coordinates: 55°32′N 40°14′E
- Country: Russia
- Region: Vladimir Oblast
- District: Gus-Khrustalny District
- Time zone: UTC+3:00

Izbishchi (Russian: Избищи) is a rural locality (a village) in Posyolok Urshelsky, Gus-Khrustalny District, Vladimir Oblast, Russia. The population was 15 as of 2010.

== Geography ==
Izbishchi is located on the right bank of the Buzha River, 39 km southwest of Gus-Khrustalny (the district's administrative centre) by road. Tikhonovo is the nearest rural locality.
