= Vashutino =

Vashutino Вашутино
- Village
- Location within Vladimir Oblast Location within Russia
- Coordinates: 55°42′N 40°43′E
- Country: Russia
- Region: Vladimir Oblast
- District: Gus-Khrustalny District
- Time zone: UTC+3:00

Vashutino (Russian: Вашутино) is a rural locality (a village) in Posyolok Anopino, Gus-Khrustalny District, Vladimir Oblast, Russia. The population was 898 as of 2010. There are 17 streets.

== Geography ==
Vashutino is located 13 km northeast of Gus-Khrustalny (the district's administrative centre) by road. Babino is the nearest rural locality.
