= Tsikul =

Tsikul Цикуль
- Selo
- Location within Vladimir Oblast Location within Russia
- Coordinates: 55°22′N 40°51′E
- Country: Russia
- Region: Vladimir Oblast
- District: Gus-Khrustalny District
- Time zone: UTC+3:00

Tsikul (Russian: Цикуль) is a rural locality (a selo) in Krasnooktyabrskoye Rural Settlement, Gus-Khrustalny District, Vladimir Oblast, Russia. The population was 57 as of 2010.

== Geography ==
Tsikul is located 43 km southeast of Gus-Khrustalny (the district's administrative centre) by road. Baranovo is the nearest rural locality.
