= Mikhali =

Mikhali Михали
- Village
- Location within Vladimir Oblast Location within Russia
- Coordinates: 55°18′N 40°25′E
- Country: Russia
- Region: Vladimir Oblast
- District: Gus-Khrustalny District
- Time zone: UTC+3:00

Mikhali (Russian: Михали) is a rural locality (a village) in Demidovskoye Rural Settlement, Gus-Khrustalny District, Vladimir Oblast, Russia. The population was 6 as of 2010.

== Geography ==
Mikhali is located 63 km south of Gus-Khrustalny (the district's administrative centre) by road. Butylki is the nearest rural locality.
