= Tasino =

Tasino Тасино
- Settlement
- Location within Vladimir Oblast Location within Russia
- Coordinates: 55°30′N 40°11′E
- Country: Russia
- Region: Vladimir Oblast
- District: Gus-Khrustalny District
- Time zone: UTC+3:00

Tasino (Russian: Тасино) is a rural locality (a settlement) in Posyolok Urshelsky, Gus-Khrustalny District, Vladimir Oblast, Russia. The population was 15 as of 2010. There are 5 streets.

== Geography ==
Tasino is located 43 km southwest of Gus-Khrustalny (the district's administrative centre) by road. Izbishchi is the nearest rural locality.
