= Malaya Artyomovka =

Malaya Artyomovka Малая Артёмовка
- Village
- Location within Vladimir Oblast Location within Russia
- Coordinates: 55°46′N 40°56′E
- Country: Russia
- Region: Vladimir Oblast
- District: Gus-Khrustalny District
- Time zone: UTC+3:00

Malaya Artyomovka (Russian: Малая Артёмовка) is a rural locality (a village) in Posyolok Krasnoye Ekho, Gus-Khrustalny District, Vladimir Oblast, Russia. The population was 44 as of 2010.

== Geography ==
Malaya Artyomovka is located 37 km northeast of Gus-Khrustalny (the district's administrative centre) by road. Pershkovo is the nearest rural locality.
