= Novo-Pokrovskoye =

Novo-Pokrovskoye Ново-Покровское
- Village
- Location within Vladimir Oblast Location within Russia
- Coordinates: 55°43′N 41°16′E
- Country: Russia
- Region: Vladimir Oblast
- District: Gus-Khrustalny District
- Time zone: UTC+3:00

Novo-Pokrovskoye (Russian: Ново-Покровское) is a rural locality (a village) in Posyolok Zolotkovo, Gus-Khrustalny District, Vladimir Oblast, Russia. The population was 15 as of 2010.

== Geography ==
Novo-Pokrovskoye is located 50 km (31 mi) northeast of Gus-Khrustalny (the district's administrative centre) by road. Karevo is the nearest rural locality.
