= Pavlikovo, Gus-Khrustalny District, Vladimir Oblast =

Pavlikovo Павликово
- Village
- Location within Vladimir Oblast Location within Russia
- Coordinates: 55°50′N 40°45′E
- Country: Russia
- Region: Vladimir Oblast
- District: Gus-Khrustalny District
- Time zone: UTC+3:00

Pavlikovo (Russian: Павликово) is a rural locality (a village) in Posyolok Krasnoye Ekho, Gus-Khrustalny District, Vladimir Oblast, Russia. The population was 36 as of 2010.

== Geography ==
Pavlikovo is located 32 km northeast of Gus-Khrustalny (the district's administrative centre) by road. Volnaya Artemovka is the nearest rural locality.
