= Staroopokino =

Staroopokino Староопокино
- Village
- Location within Vladimir Oblast Location within Russia
- Coordinates: 55°43′N 40°54′E
- Country: Russia
- Region: Vladimir Oblast
- District: Gus-Khrustalny District
- Time zone: UTC+3:00

Staroopokino (Russian: Староопокино) is a rural locality (a village) in Posyolok Krasnoye Ekho, Gus-Khrustalny District, Vladimir Oblast, Russia. The population was 5 as of 2010.

== Geography ==
Staroopokino is located 30 km northeast of Gus-Khrustalny (the district's administrative centre) by road. Novoopokino is the nearest rural locality.
