= Krasny Yakor =

Krasny Yakor Красный Якорь
- Village
- Location within Vladimir Oblast Location within Russia
- Coordinates: 55°34′N 40°37′E
- Country: Russia
- Region: Vladimir Oblast
- District: Gus-Khrustalny District
- Time zone: UTC+3:00

Krasny Yakor (Russian: Красный Якорь) is a rural locality (a village) in Posyolok Mezinovsky, Gus-Khrustalny District, Vladimir Oblast, Russia. The population was 38 as of 2010. There are 7 streets.

== Geography ==
Krasny Yakor is located 6 km south of Gus-Khrustalny (the district's administrative centre) by road. Gus-Khrustalny is the nearest rural locality.
