= Kupreyevo =

Kupreyevo Купреево
- Village
- Location within Vladimir Oblast Location within Russia
- Coordinates: 55°19′N 41°01′E
- Country: Russia
- Region: Vladimir Oblast
- District: Gus-Khrustalny District
- Time zone: UTC+3:00

Kupreyevo (Russian: Купреево) is a rural locality (a village) and the administrative center of Kupreyevskoye Rural Settlement, Gus-Khrustalny District, Vladimir Oblast, Russia. The population was 670 as of 2010. There are 5 streets.

== Geography ==
Kupreyevo is located 55 km southeast of Gus-Khrustalny (the district's administrative centre) by road. Yakimets is the nearest rural locality.
