= Georgiyevo =

Georgiyevo Георгиево
- Selo
- Location within Vladimir Oblast Location within Russia
- Coordinates: 55°29′44″N 41°10′34″E
- Country: Russia
- Region: Vladimir Oblast
- District: Gus-Khrustalny District
- Time zone: UTC+3:00

Georgiyevo (Russian: Гео́ргиево) is a rural locality (a selo) in Posyolok Dobryatino, Gus-Khrustalny District, Vladimir Oblast, Russia. The population was 219 as of 2010. There are 5 streets.

== Geography ==
Georgiyevo is located 51 km southeast of Gus-Khrustalny (the district's administrative centre) by road. Ilyino is the nearest rural locality.
