= Tashchilovo =

Tashchilovo Тащилово
- Selo
- Location within Vladimir Oblast Location within Russia
- Coordinates: 55°21′N 41°26′E
- Country: Russia
- Region: Vladimir Oblast
- District: Gus-Khrustalny District
- Time zone: UTC+3:00

Tashchilovo (Russian: Тащилово) is a rural locality (a selo) in Kupreyevskoye Rural Settlement, Gus-Khrustalny District, Vladimir Oblast, Russia. The population was 496 as of 2010. There are 4 streets.

== Geography ==
Tashchilovo is located 61 km southeast of Gus-Khrustalny (the district's administrative centre) by road. Shabanovo is the nearest rural locality.
