= Borzino =

Borzino Борзино
- Village
- Location within Vladimir Oblast Location within Russia
- Coordinates: 55°35′N 40°56′E
- Country: Russia
- Region: Vladimir Oblast
- District: Gus-Khrustalny District
- Time zone: UTC+3:00

Borzino (Russian: Борзино) is a rural locality (a village) in Posyolok Zolotkovo, Gus-Khrustalny District, Vladimir Oblast, Russia. The population was 19 as of 2010.

== Geography ==
Borzino is located on the Kopl River, 22 km east of Gus-Khrustalny (the district's administrative centre) by road. Novo-Novlyanovo is the nearest rural locality.
