= Yazvitsy =

Yazvitsy Язвицы
- Village
- Location within Vladimir Oblast Location within Russia
- Coordinates: 55°42′N 41°05′E
- Country: Russia
- Region: Vladimir Oblast
- District: Gus-Khrustalny District
- Time zone: UTC+3:00

Yazvitsy (Russian: Язвицы) is a rural locality (a village) in Posyolok Zolotkovo, Gus-Khrustalny District, Vladimir Oblast, Russia. The population was 18 as of 2010.

== Geography ==
Yazvitsy is located 40 km northeast of Gus-Khrustalny (the district's administrative centre) by road. Imeni Vorovskogo is the nearest rural locality.
