= Ivanishchi =

Ivanishchi Иванищи
- Settlement
- Location within Vladimir Oblast Location within Russia
- Coordinates: 55°46′N 40°25′E
- Country: Russia
- Region: Vladimir Oblast
- District: Gus-Khrustalny District

Population
  - Total: 1,633
- Time zone: UTC+3:00
- Postal code: 601521

Ivanishchi (Russian: Иванищи) is a rural locality (a settlement) in Posyolok Ivanishchi, Gus-Khrustalny District, Vladimir Oblast, Russia. The population was 1,945 as of 2010. There are 24 streets.

== Geography ==
Ivanishchi is located 49 km northwest of Gus-Khrustalny (the district's administrative centre) by road. Neklyudovo is the nearest rural locality.
