= Gubtsevo =

Gubtsevo Губцево
- Selo
- Location within Vladimir Oblast Location within Russia
- Coordinates: 55°43′N 41°00′E
- Country: Russia
- Region: Vladimir Oblast
- District: Gus-Khrustalny District
- Time zone: UTC+3:00

Gubtsevo (Russian: Губцево) is a rural locality (a selo) in Posyolok Krasnoye Ekho, Gus-Khrustalny District, Vladimir Oblast, Russia. The population was 53 as of 2010. There are 6 streets.

== Geography ==
Gubtsevo is located 30 km northeast of Gus-Khrustalny (the district's administrative centre) by road. Tolstikovo is the nearest rural locality.
