= Poboyki =

Poboyki Побойки
- Village
- Location within Vladimir Oblast Location within Russia
- Coordinates: 55°47′N 40°40′E
- Country: Russia
- Region: Vladimir Oblast
- District: Gus-Khrustalny District
- Time zone: UTC+3:00

Poboyki (Russian: Побойки) is a rural locality (a village) in Posyolok Krasnoye Ekho, Gus-Khrustalny District, Vladimir Oblast, Russia. The population was 36 as of 2010.

== Geography ==
Poboyki is located 25 km north of Gus-Khrustalny (the district's administrative centre) by road. Krasnoye Ekho is the nearest rural locality.
