= Mitenino =

Mitenino Митенино
- Village
- Location within Vladimir Oblast Location within Russia
- Coordinates: 55°51′N 40°31′E
- Country: Russia
- Region: Vladimir Oblast
- District: Gus-Khrustalny District
- Time zone: UTC+3:00

Mitenino (Russian: Митенино) is a rural locality (a village) in Posyolok Ivanishchi, Gus-Khrustalny District, Vladimir Oblast, Russia. The population was 2 as of 2010.

== Geography ==
Mitenino is located 40 km north of Gus-Khrustalny (the district's administrative centre) by road. Neklyudovo is the nearest rural locality.
