= Novo-Durovo =

Novo-Durovo Ново-Дурово
- Village
- Location within Vladimir Oblast Location within Russia
- Coordinates: 55°17′N 41°06′E
- Country: Russia
- Region: Vladimir Oblast
- District: Gus-Khrustalny District
- Time zone: UTC+3:00

Novo-Durovo (Russian: Ново-Дурово) is a rural locality (a village) in Kupreyevskoye Rural Settlement, Gus-Khrustalny District, Vladimir Oblast, Russia. The population was 206 as of 2010.

== Geography ==
Novo-Durovo is located on the Charmus River, 66 km southeast of Gus-Khrustalny (the district's administrative centre) by road. Dolbino is the nearest rural locality.
