= Velikodvorsky =

Velikodvorsky Великодворский
- Settlement
- Location within Vladimir Oblast Location within Russia
- Coordinates: 55°14′N 40°39′E
- Country: Russia
- Region: Vladimir Oblast
- District: Gus-Khrustalny District
- Time zone: UTC+3:00

Velikodvorsky (Russian: Великодворский) is a rural locality (a settlement) and the administrative center of Posyolok Velikodvorsky, Gus-Khrustalny District, Vladimir Oblast, Russia. The population was 1,984 as of 2010. There are 19 streets.

== Geography ==
Velikodvorsky is located 47 km south of Gus-Khrustalny (the district's administrative centre) by road. Velikodvorye is the nearest rural locality.
