= Tasinsky Bor =

Tasinsky Bor Тасинский Бор
- Settlement
- Location within Vladimir Oblast Location within Russia
- Coordinates: 55°37′N 40°09′E
- Country: Russia
- Region: Vladimir Oblast
- District: Gus-Khrustalny District
- Time zone: UTC+3:00

Tasinsky Bor (Russian: Тасинский Бор) is a rural locality (a settlement) in Posyolok Urshelsky, Gus-Khrustalny District, Vladimir Oblast, Russia. The population was 412 as of 2010. There are 9 streets.

== Geography ==
Tasinsky Bor is located 39 km west of Gus-Khrustalny (the district's administrative centre) by road. Vasilevo is the nearest rural locality.
