= Larinskaya =

Larinskaya Ларинская
- Village
- Location within Vladimir Oblast Location within Russia
- Coordinates: 55°43′N 40°51′E
- Country: Russia
- Region: Vladimir Oblast
- District: Gus-Khrustalny District
- Time zone: UTC+3:00

Larinskaya (Russian: Ларинская) is a rural locality (a village) in Posyolok Krasnoye Ekho, Gus-Khrustalny District, Vladimir Oblast, Russia. The population was 9 as of 2010.

== Geography ==
Larinskaya is located 34 km northeast of Gus-Khrustalny (the district's administrative centre) by road. Staroopokino is the nearest rural locality.
