= Mokroye, Vladimir Oblast =

Mokroye Мокрое
- Village
- Location within Vladimir Oblast Location within Russia
- Coordinates: 55°27′N 40°15′E
- Country: Russia
- Region: Vladimir Oblast
- District: Gus-Khrustalny District
- Time zone: UTC+3:00

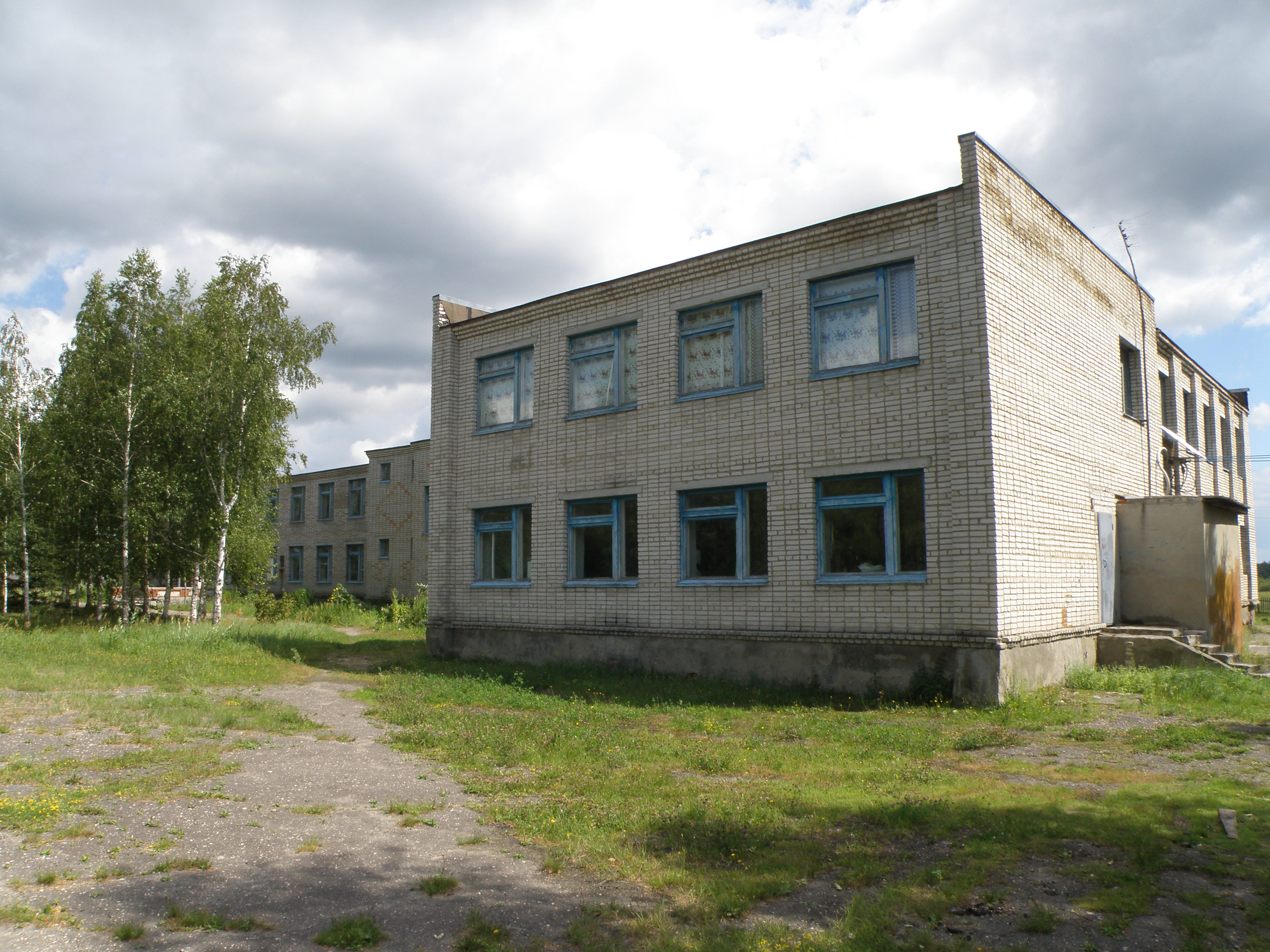
A school in Mokroye

Mokroye (Russian: Мокрое) is a rural locality (a village) in Demidovskoye Rural Settlement, Gus-Khrustalny District, Vladimir Oblast, Russia. The population was 234 as of 2010. The village of Mokroye is sometimes mentioned in Fyodor Dostoevsky's novel The Brothers Karamazov.

== Geography ==
Mokroye is located on the Karaslitsa River, 42 km southwest of Gus-Khrustalny (the district's administrative centre) by road. Orlovo is the nearest rural locality.
