= Lazarevka, Vladimir Oblast =

Lazarevka Лазаревка
- Village
- Location within Vladimir Oblast Location within Russia
- Coordinates: 55°36′N 41°12′E
- Country: Russia
- Region: Vladimir Oblast
- District: Gus-Khrustalny District
- Time zone: UTC+3:00

Lazarevka (Russian: Лазаревка) is a rural locality (a village) in Posyolok Zolotkovo, Gus-Khrustalny District, Vladimir Oblast, Russia. The population was 7 as of 2010.

== Geography ==
Lazarevka is located 39 km east of Gus-Khrustalny (the district's administrative centre) by road. Borisovo is the nearest rural locality.
