= Nechayevskaya =

Nechayevskaya Нечаевская
- Village
- Location within Vladimir Oblast Location within Russia
- Coordinates: 55°30′N 40°36′E
- Country: Russia
- Region: Vladimir Oblast
- District: Gus-Khrustalny District
- Time zone: UTC+3:00

Nechayevskaya (Russian: Нечаевская) is a rural locality (a village) in Posyolok Mezinovsky, Gus-Khrustalny District, Vladimir Oblast, Russia. The population was 799 as of 2010. There are 7 streets.

== Geography ==
Nechayevskaya is located 17 km south of Gus-Khrustalny (the district's administrative centre) by road. Zelyony Dol is the nearest rural locality.
