= Zakolpye =

Zakolpye Заколпье
- Selo
- Location within Vladimir Oblast Location within Russia
- Coordinates: 55°31′N 40°59′E
- Country: Russia
- Region: Vladimir Oblast
- District: Gus-Khrustalny District
- Time zone: UTC+3:00

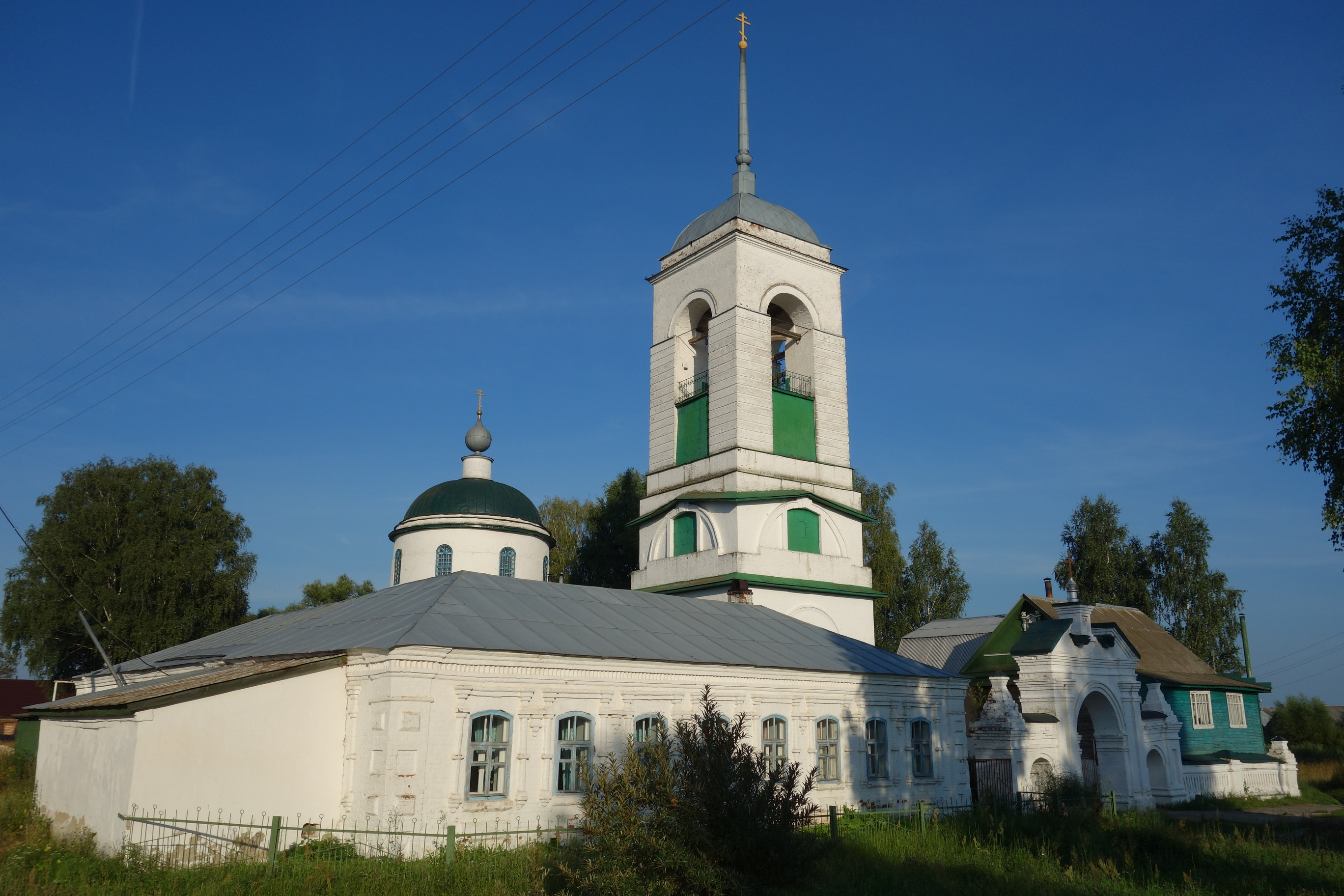
Church of the Nativity of Christ: Zakolpye, Gus-Khrustalny District, Vladimir Region

Zakolpye (Russian: Заколпье) is a rural locality (a selo) in Grigoryevskoye Rural Settlement, Gus-Khrustalny District, Vladimir Oblast, Russia. The population was 475 as of 2010. There are 3 streets.

== Geography ==
Zakolpye is located on the right bank of the Kolp River, 36 km southeast of Gus-Khrustalny (the district's administrative centre) by road. Grigoryevo is the nearest rural locality.
