= Makhonino =

Makhonino Махонино
- Village
- Location within Vladimir Oblast Location within Russia
- Coordinates: 55°30′N 40°56′E
- Country: Russia
- Region: Vladimir Oblast
- District: Gus-Khrustalny District
- Time zone: UTC+3:00

Makhonino (Russian: Махонино) is a rural locality (a village) in Grigoryevskoye Rural Settlement, Gus-Khrustalny District, Vladimir Oblast, Russia. The population was 102 (2021 census), 81 as of 2010.

== Geography ==
Makhonino is located 32 km southeast of Gus-Khrustalny (the district's administrative centre) by road. Grigoryevo is the nearest rural locality.
