= Pershkovo =

Pershkovo Першково
- Village
- Location within Vladimir Oblast Location within Russia
- Coordinates: 55°45′N 40°58′E
- Country: Russia
- Region: Vladimir Oblast
- District: Gus-Khrustalny District
- Time zone: UTC+3:00

Pershkovo (Russian: Першково) is a rural locality (a village) in Posyolok Krasnoye Ekho, Gus-Khrustalny District, Vladimir Oblast, Russia. The population was 61 as of 2010.

== Geography ==
Pershkovo is located 35 km northeast of Gus-Khrustalny (the district's administrative centre) by road. Tolstikovo is the nearest rural locality.
