= Zabolotye, Gus-Khrustalny District, Vladimir Oblast =

Zabolotye Заболотье
- Village
- Location within Vladimir Oblast Location within Russia
- Coordinates: 55°38′N 40°22′E
- Country: Russia
- Region: Vladimir Oblast
- District: Gus-Khrustalny District
- Time zone: UTC+3:00

Zabolotye (Russian: Заболотье) is a rural locality (a village) in Posyolok Urshelsky, Gus-Khrustalny District, Vladimir Oblast, Russia. The population was 122 as of 2010.

== Geography ==
Zabolotye is located 27 km west of Gus-Khrustalny (the district's administrative centre) by road. Abbakumovo is the nearest rural locality.
