= Novouvarovka =

Novouvarovka Новоуваровка
- Village
- Location within Vladimir Oblast Location within Russia
- Coordinates: 55°17′N 40°48′E
- Country: Russia
- Region: Vladimir Oblast
- District: Gus-Khrustalny District
- Time zone: UTC+3:00

Novouvarovka (Russian: Новоуваровка) is a rural locality (a village) in Ulyakhinskoye Rural Settlement, Gus-Khrustalny District, Vladimir Oblast, Russia. The population was 7 as of 2010.

== Geography ==
Novouvarovka is located 54 km south of Gus-Khrustalny (the district's administrative centre) by road. Novo-Maltsevo is the nearest rural locality.
