= Pshenitsino =

Pshenitsino Пшеницино
- Village
- Location within Vladimir Oblast Location within Russia
- Coordinates: 55°51′N 40°33′E
- Country: Russia
- Region: Vladimir Oblast
- District: Gus-Khrustalny District
- Time zone: UTC+3:00

Pshenitsino (Russian: Пшеницино) is a rural locality (a village) in Posyolok Ivanishchi, Gus-Khrustalny District, Vladimir Oblast, Russia. The population was 12 as of 2010.

== Geography ==
Pshenitsino is located 41 km north of Gus-Khrustalny (the district's administrative centre) by road. Neklyudovo is the nearest rural locality.
