= Kuzmino, Gus-Khrustalny District, Vladimir Oblast =

Kuzmino Кузьмино
- Village
- Location within Vladimir Oblast Location within Russia
- Coordinates: 55°29′N 40°21′E
- Country: Russia
- Region: Vladimir Oblast
- District: Gus-Khrustalny District
- Time zone: UTC+3:00

Kuzmino (Russian: Кузьмино) is a rural locality (a village) in Posyolok Mezinovsky, Gus-Khrustalny District, Vladimir Oblast, Russia. The population was 52 as of 2010.

== Geography ==
Kuzmino is located 32 km southwest of Gus-Khrustalny (the district's administrative centre) by road. Ilyichyovo is the nearest rural locality.
