= Malyshkino =

Malyshkino Малышкино
- Village
- Location within Vladimir Oblast Location within Russia
- Coordinates: 55°14′N 40°42′E
- Country: Russia
- Region: Vladimir Oblast
- District: Gus-Khrustalny District
- Time zone: UTC+3:00

Malyshkino (Russian: Малышкино) is a sparsely populated rural locality (a village) in Posyolok Velikodvorsky, Gus-Khrustalny District, Vladimir Oblast, Russia. The population was 12 as of 2010.

== Geography ==
Malyshkino is located on the Dandur River, 51 km south of Gus-Khrustalny (the district's administrative centre) by road. Velikodvorsky is the nearest rural locality.
