= Kharlamovo =

Kharlamovo Харламово
- Village
- Location within Vladimir Oblast Location within Russia
- Coordinates: 55°14′28″N 40°37′41″E
- Country: Russia
- Region: Vladimir Oblast
- District: Gus-Khrustalny District
- Time zone: UTC+3:00

Kharlamovo (Russian: Харламово) is a rural locality (a village) in Posyolok Velikodvorsky, Gus-Khrustalny District, Vladimir Oblast, Russia. The population was 4 as of 2010.

== Geography ==
Kharlamovo is located on the Dandur River, 52 km south of Gus-Khrustalny (the district's administrative centre) by road. Velikodvorye is the nearest rural locality.
