= Novo-Maltsevo =

Novo-Maltsevo Ново-Мальцево
- Village
- Location within Vladimir Oblast Location within Russia
- Coordinates: 55°16′N 40°49′E
- Country: Russia
- Region: Vladimir Oblast
- District: Gus-Khrustalny District
- Time zone: UTC+3:00

Novo-Maltsevo (Russian: Ново-Мальцево) is a rural locality (a village) in Ulyakhinskoye Rural Settlement, Gus-Khrustalny District, Vladimir Oblast, Russia. The population was 40 as of 2010.

== Geography ==
Novo-Maltsevo is located 53 km south of Gus-Khrustalny (the district's administrative centre) by road. Novouvarovka is the nearest rural locality.
