= Malyukovsky =

Malyukovsky Малюковский
- Settlement
- Location within Vladimir Oblast Location within Russia
- Coordinates: 55°17′N 41°03′E
- Country: Russia
- Region: Vladimir Oblast
- District: Gus-Khrustalny District
- Time zone: UTC+3:00

Malyukovsky (Russian: Малюковский) is a rural locality (a settlement) in Kupreyevskoye Rural Settlement, Gus-Khrustalny District, Vladimir Oblast, Russia. The population was 4 as of 2010.

== Geography ==
Malyukovsky is located on the right bank of the Kolp River, 61 km southeast of Gus-Khrustalny (the district's administrative centre) by road. Neverovsky is the nearest rural locality.
