= Zelyony Dol, Gus-Khrustalny District, Vladimir Oblast =

Zelyony Dol Зелёный Дол
- Settlement
- Location within Vladimir Oblast Location within Russia
- Coordinates: 55°29′N 40°35′E
- Country: Russia
- Region: Vladimir Oblast
- District: Gus-Khrustalny District
- Time zone: UTC+3:00

Zelyony Dol (Russian: Зелёный Дол) is a rural locality (a settlement) in Posyolok Mezinovsky, Gus-Khrustalny District, Vladimir Oblast, Russia. The population was 40 as of 2010.

== Geography ==
Zelyony Dol is located 18 km south of Gus-Khrustalny (the district's administrative centre) by road. Nechayevskaya is the nearest rural locality.
