= Gus-Khrustalny =

Gus-Khrustalny (masculine), Gus-Khrustalnaya (feminine), or Gus-Khrustalnoye (neuter) may refer to:

- Gus-Khrustalny District, a district of Vladimir Oblast, Russia
- Gus-Khrustalny (town), a town in Vladimir Oblast, Russia
- Gus-Khrustalny Urban Okrug, the municipal formation this town is incorporated as
