= Novo-Novlyanovo =

Novo-Novlyanovo Ново-Новляново
- Village
- Location within Vladimir Oblast Location within Russia
- Coordinates: 55°36′N 40°55′E
- Country: Russia
- Region: Vladimir Oblast
- District: Gus-Khrustalny District
- Time zone: UTC+3:00

Novo-Novlyanovo (Russian: Ново-Новляново) is a rural locality (a village) in Posyolok Zolotkovo, Gus-Khrustalny District, Vladimir Oblast, Russia. The population was 2 as of 2010.

== Geography ==
Novo-Novlyanovo is located on the Kolp River, 21 km east of Gus-Khrustalny (the district's administrative centre) by road. Borzino is the nearest rural locality.
