= Chaslitsy =

Chaslitsy Часлицы
- Village
- Location within Vladimir Oblast Location within Russia
- Coordinates: 55°26′N 40°20′E
- Country: Russia
- Region: Vladimir Oblast
- District: Gus-Khrustalny District
- Time zone: UTC+3:00

Chaslitsy (Russian: Часлицы) is a rural locality (a village) in Demidovskoye Rural Settlement, Gus-Khrustalny District, Vladimir Oblast, Russia. The population was 74 as of 2010.

== Geography ==
Chaslitsy is located 35 km southwest of Gus-Khrustalny (the district's administrative centre) by road. Zanutrino is the nearest rural locality.
