= Tyurvishchi =

Tyurvishchi Тюрьвищи
- Village
- Location within Vladimir Oblast Location within Russia
- Coordinates: 55°24′N 40°13′E
- Country: Russia
- Region: Vladimir Oblast
- District: Gus-Khrustalny District
- Time zone: UTC+3:00

Tyurvishchi (Russian: Тюрьвищи) is a rural locality (a village) in Demidovskoye Rural Settlement, Gus-Khrustalny District, Vladimir Oblast, Russia. The population was 43 as of 2010. There are 3 streets.

== Geography ==
Tyurvishchi is located 44 km southwest of Gus-Khrustalny (the district's administrative centre) by road. Demidovo is the nearest rural locality.
