= Yagodino =

Yagodino Ягодино
- Village
- Location within Vladimir Oblast Location within Russia
- Coordinates: 55°33′N 40°16′E
- Country: Russia
- Region: Vladimir Oblast
- District: Gus-Khrustalny District
- Time zone: UTC+3:00

Yagodino (Russian: Ягодино) is a rural locality (a village) in Posyolok Urshelsky, Gus-Khrustalny District, Vladimir Oblast, Russia. The population was 13 as of 2010.

== Geography ==
Yagodino is located 36 km west of Gus-Khrustalny (the district's administrative centre) by road. Tikhonovo is the nearest rural locality.
