= Erleks =

Erleks Эрлекс
- Selo
- Location within Vladimir Oblast Location within Russia
- Coordinates: 55°36′N 40°23′E
- Country: Russia
- Region: Vladimir Oblast
- District: Gus-Khrustalny District
- Time zone: UTC+3:00

Erleks (Russian: Эрлекс) is a rural locality (a selo) in Posyolok Urshelsky, Gus-Khrustalny District, Vladimir Oblast, Russia. The population was 10 as of 2010.

== Geography ==
Erleks is located on the right bank of the Pol River, 22 km west of Gus-Khrustalny (the district's administrative centre) by road. Trufanovo is the nearest rural locality.
