= Butylki =

Butylki Бутылки
- Village
- Location within Vladimir Oblast Location within Russia
- Coordinates: 55°20′N 40°27′E
- Country: Russia
- Region: Vladimir Oblast
- District: Gus-Khrustalny District
- Time zone: UTC+3:00

Butylki (Russian: Буты́лки) is a rural locality (a village) in Demidovskoye Rural Settlement, Gus-Khrustalny District, Vladimir Oblast, Russia. The population was 1 as of 2010.

== Geography ==
Butylki is located 59 km south of Gus-Khrustalny (the district's administrative centre) by road. Narma is the nearest rural locality.
