= Nikulino, Gus-Khrustalny District, Vladimir Oblast =

Nikulino Никулино
- Village
- Location within Vladimir Oblast Location within Russia
- Coordinates: 55°38′N 40°48′E
- Country: Russia
- Region: Vladimir Oblast
- District: Gus-Khrustalny District
- Time zone: UTC+3:00

Nikulino (Russian: Никулино) is a rural locality (a village) in Posyolok Anopino, Gus-Khrustalny District, Vladimir Oblast, Russia. The population was 328 in 2010. There are three streets.

== Geography ==
Nikulino is located 12 km east of Gus-Khrustalny (the district's administrative centre) by road. Vyoshki is the nearest rural locality.
