= Maslikha =

Maslikha Маслиха
- Village
- Location within Vladimir Oblast Location within Russia
- Coordinates: 55°24′N 40°48′E
- Country: Russia
- Region: Vladimir Oblast
- District: Gus-Khrustalny District
- Time zone: UTC+3:00

Maslikha (Russian: Маслиха) is a rural locality (a village) in Krasnooktyabrskoye Rural Settlement, Gus-Khrustalny District, Vladimir Oblast, Russia. The population was 2 as of 2010.

== Geography ==
Maslikha is located 43 km south of Gus-Khrustalny (the district's administrative centre) by road. Aksyonovo is the nearest rural locality.
