= Shevertni =

Shevertni Шевертни
- Village
- Location within Vladimir Oblast Location within Russia
- Coordinates: 55°27′N 40°16′E
- Country: Russia
- Region: Vladimir Oblast
- District: Gus-Khrustalny District
- Time zone: UTC+3:00

Shevertni (Russian: Шевертни) is a rural locality (a village) in Demidovskoye Rural Settlement, Gus-Khrustalny District, Vladimir Oblast, Russia. The population was 176 as of 2010.

== Geography ==
Shevertni is located 42 km southwest of Gus-Khrustalny (the district's administrative centre) by road. Orlovo is the nearest rural locality.
