= Bobry, Vladimir Oblast =

Village in Russia

Bobry Бобры
- Village
- Location within Vladimir Oblast Location within Russia
- Coordinates: 55°21′28″N 40°28′17″E
- Country: Russia
- Region: Vladimir Oblast
- District: Gus-Khrustalny District
- Time zone: UTC+3:00

Bobry (Russian: Бобры́) is a rural locality (a village) in Demidovskoye Rural Settlement, Gus-Khrustalny District, Vladimir Oblast, Russia. The population was 3 as of (2021 census);2 as of 2010.

== Geography ==
Bobry is located 56 kilometres (35 mi) south of Gus-Khrustalny (the district's administrative centre) by road. Yevsino is the nearest rural locality.
