= Krasny Oktyabr, Gus-Khrustalny District, Vladimir Oblast =

Krasny Oktyabr Красный Октябрь
- Settlement
- Location within Vladimir Oblast Location within Russia
- Coordinates: 55°24′N 40°54′E
- Country: Russia
- Region: Vladimir Oblast
- District: Gus-Khrustalny District
- Time zone: UTC+3:00

Krasny Oktyabr (Russian: Красный Октябрь) is a rural locality (a settlement) and the administrative center of Krasnooktyabrskoye Rural Settlement, Gus-Khrustalny District, Vladimir Oblast, Russia. The population was 790 as of 2010. There are 13 streets.

== Geography ==
Krasny Oktyabr is located 48 km southeast of Gus-Khrustalny (the district's administrative centre) by road. Tsikul is the nearest rural locality.
