= Ulyakhino =

Ulyakhino Уляхино
- Village
- Location within Vladimir Oblast Location within Russia
- Coordinates: 55°20′N 40°44′E
- Country: Russia
- Region: Vladimir Oblast
- District: Gus-Khrustalny District
- Time zone: UTC+3:00

Ulyakhino (Russian: Уляхино) is a rural locality (a village) and the administrative center of Ulyakhinskoye Rural Settlement, Gus-Khrustalny District, Vladimir Oblast, Russia. The population was 516 as of 2010.

== Geography ==
Ulyakhino is located 42 km south of Gus-Khrustalny (the district's administrative centre) by road. Sivtsevo is the nearest rural locality.
