= Okatovo, Gus-Khrustalny District, Vladimir Oblast =

Okatovo Окатово
- Village
- Location within Vladimir Oblast Location within Russia
- Coordinates: 55°26′N 40°46′E
- Country: Russia
- Region: Vladimir Oblast
- District: Gus-Khrustalny District
- Time zone: UTC+3:00

Okatovo (Russian: Ока́тово) is a rural locality (a village) in Krasnooktyabrskoye Rural Settlement, Gus-Khrustalny District, Vladimir Oblast, Russia. The population was 127 as of 2010.

== Geography ==
Okatovo is located on the Shershul River, 48 km southeast of Gus-Khrustalny (the district's administrative centre) by road. Stepanovo is the nearest rural locality.
