= Makhinsky =

Makhinsky Махинский
- Settlement
- Location within Vladimir Oblast Location within Russia
- Coordinates: 55°31′N 41°20′E
- Country: Russia
- Region: Vladimir Oblast
- District: Gus-Khrustalny District
- Time zone: UTC+3:00

Makhinsky (Russian: Махинский) is a rural locality (a settlement) in Posyolok Dobryatino, Gus-Khrustalny District, Vladimir Oblast, Russia. The population was 19 as of 2010.

== Geography ==
Makhinsky is located 64 km east of Gus-Khrustalny (the district's administrative centre) by road. Dobryatino is the nearest rural locality.
