= Obdikhovo =

Obdikhovo Обдихово
- Village
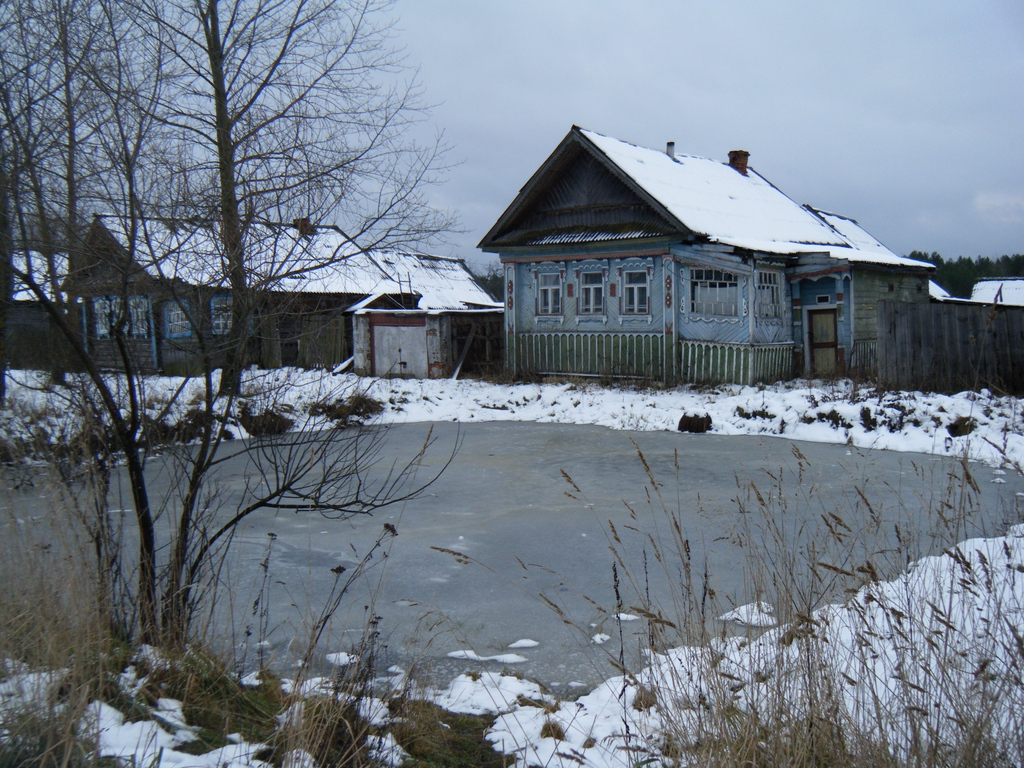
- Houses in Obdikhovo, 2009

- Location within Vladimir Oblast Location within Russia
- Coordinates: 55°25′N 41°12′E
- Country: Russia
- Region: Vladimir Oblast
- District: Gus-Khrustalny District
- Time zone: UTC+3:00

Obdikhovo (Russian: Обдихово) is a rural locality (a village) in Posyolok Zolotkovo, Gus-Khrustalny District, Vladimir Oblast, Russia. The population was 46 as of 2010.

== Geography ==
Obdikhovo is located on the Charmus River, 59 km southeast of Gus-Khrustalny (the district's administrative centre) by road. Vasilevo is the nearest rural locality.
