= Usady, Gus-Khrustalny District, Vladimir Oblast =

Usady Усады
- Village
- Location within Vladimir Oblast Location within Russia
- Coordinates: 55°31′N 41°17′E
- Country: Russia
- Region: Vladimir Oblast
- District: Gus-Khrustalny District
- Time zone: UTC+3:00

Usady (Russian: Уса́ды) is a rural locality (a village) in Gus-Khrustalny District, Posyolok Dobryatino, Vladimir Oblast, Russia. The population was 40 as of 2010.

== Geography ==
Usady is located 59 km east of Gus-Khrustalny (the district's administrative centre) by road. Dobryatino is the nearest rural locality.
