= Savikovo =

Savikovo Савиково
- Village
- Location within Vladimir Oblast Location within Russia
- Coordinates: 55°22′N 40°48′E
- Country: Russia
- Region: Vladimir Oblast
- District: Gus-Khrustalny District
- Time zone: UTC+3:00

Savikovo (Russian: Савиково) is a rural locality (a village) in Krasnooktyabrskoye Rural Settlement, Gus-Khrustalny District, Vladimir Oblast, Russia. The population was 11 in 2010.

== Geography ==
Savikovo is located on the Sentur River, 41 km south of Gus-Khrustalny (the district's administrative centre) by road. Aksyonovo is the nearest rural locality.
