= Alfyorovo, Gus-Khrustalny District, Vladimir Oblast =

Alfyorovo Алфёрово
- Village
- Location within Vladimir Oblast Location within Russia
- Coordinates: 55°30′N 41°13′E
- Country: Russia
- Region: Vladimir Oblast
- District: Gus-Khrustalny District
- Time zone: UTC+3:00

Alfyorovo (Russian: Алфёрово) is a rural locality (a village) in Posyolok Dobryatino, Gus-Khrustalny District, Vladimir Oblast, Russia. The population was 129 as of 2010. There are 5 streets.

== Geography ==
Alfyorovo is located 54 km southeast of Gus-Khrustalny (the district's administrative centre) by road. Ilyino is the nearest rural locality.
