= Dobryatino =

Dobryatino Добрятино
- Settlement
- Location within Vladimir Oblast Location within Russia
- Coordinates: 55°30′N 41°19′E
- Country: Russia
- Region: Vladimir Oblast
- District: Gus-Khrustalny District
- Time zone: UTC+3:00

Dobryatino (Russian: Добря́тино) is a rural locality (a settlement) and the administrative center of Posyolok Dobryatino, Gus-Khrustalny District, Vladimir Oblast, Russia. The population was 1,798 as of 2010. There are 15 streets.

== Geography ==
Dobryatino is located 62 km southeast of Gus-Khrustalny (the district's administrative centre) by road. Makhinsky is the nearest rural locality.
