= Zolotkovsky =

Zolotkovsky Золотковский
- Passing loop
- Location within Vladimir Oblast Location within Russia
- Coordinates: 55°30′N 41°04′E
- Country: Russia
- Region: Vladimir Oblast
- District: Gus-Khrustalny District
- Time zone: UTC+3:00

Zolotkovsky (Russian: Золотковский) is a rural locality (a passing loop) in Posyolok Zolotkovo, Gus-Khrustalny District, Vladimir Oblast, Russia. The population was 479 as of 2010. There are 12 streets.

== Geography ==
Zolotkovsky is located 47 km southeast of Gus-Khrustalny (the district's administrative centre) by road. Zolotkovo is the nearest rural locality.
