= Budevichi =

Budevichi Будевичи
- Village
- Location within Vladimir Oblast Location within Russia
- Coordinates: 55°30′N 40°22′E
- Country: Russia
- Region: Vladimir Oblast
- District: Gus-Khrustalny District
- Time zone: UTC+3:00

Budevichi (Russian: Будевичи) is a rural locality (a village) in Posyolok Mezinovsky, Gus-Khrustalny District, Vladimir Oblast, Russia. The population was 15 as of 2010.

== Geography ==
Budevichi is located 35 km southwest of Gus-Khrustalny (the district's administrative centre) by road. Kuzmino is the nearest rural locality.
