= Palishchi =

Palishchi Палищи
- Selo
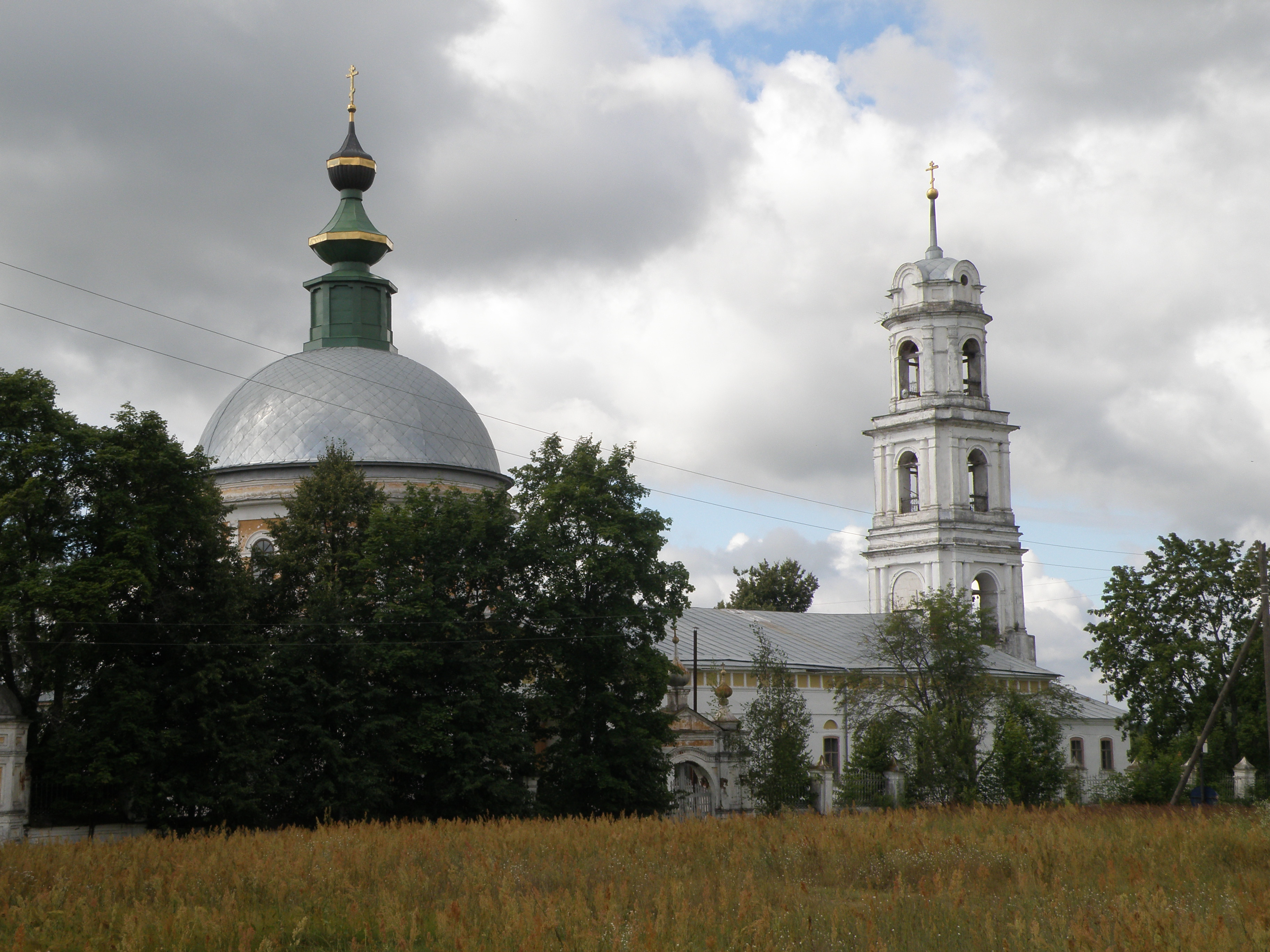
- Church in Palishchi village

- Location within Vladimir Oblast Location within Russia
- Coordinates: 55°25′N 40°19′E
- Country: Russia
- Region: Vladimir Oblast
- District: Gus-Khrustalny District
- Time zone: UTC+3:00

Palishchi (Russian: Палищи) is a rural locality (a selo) in Demidovskoye Rural Settlement, Gus-Khrustalny District, Vladimir Oblast, Russia. The population was 6 as of 2010.

== Geography ==
Palishchi is located 37 km southwest of Gus-Khrustalny (the district's administrative centre) by road. Spudni is the nearest rural locality.
