= Neklyudovo =

Neklyudovo Неклюдово
- Village
- Location within Vladimir Oblast Location within Russia
- Coordinates: 55°50′N 40°31′E
- Country: Russia
- Region: Vladimir Oblast
- District: Gus-Khrustalny District
- Time zone: UTC+3:00

Neklyudovo (Russian: Неклюдово) is a rural locality (a village) in Posyolok Ivanishchi, Gus-Khrustalny District, Vladimir Oblast, Russia. The population was 142 as of 2010. There are 5 streets.

== Geography ==
Neklyudovo is located 38 km north of Gus-Khrustalny (the district's administrative centre) by road. Mitenino is the nearest rural locality.
