= Bolshaya Artyomovka =

Bolshaya Artyomovka Большая Артёмовка
- Village
- Location within Vladimir Oblast Location within Russia
- Coordinates: 55°47′N 40°53′E
- Country: Russia
- Region: Vladimir Oblast
- District: Gus-Khrustalny District
- Time zone: UTC+3:00

Bolshaya Artyomovka (Russian: Больша́я Артёмовка) is a rural locality (a village) in Posyolok Krasnoye Ekho, Gus-Khrustalny District, Vladimir Oblast, Russia. The population was 15 as of 2010.

== Geography ==
Bolshaya Artyomovka is located 36 km northeast of Gus-Khrustalny (the district's administrative centre) by road. Malaya Artyomovka is the nearest rural locality.
