= Ryazanovo, Vladimir Oblast =

Ryazanovo Рязаново
- Village
- Location within Vladimir Oblast Location within Russia
- Coordinates: 55°21′N 40°25′E
- Country: Russia
- Region: Vladimir Oblast
- District: Gus-Khrustalny District
- Time zone: UTC+3:00

Ryazanovo (Russian: Рязаново) is a rural locality (a village) in Demidovskoye Rural Settlement, Gus-Khrustalny District, Vladimir Oblast, Russia. The population was 3 as of 2010.

== Geography ==
Ryazanovo is located 53 km south of Gus-Khrustalny (the district's administrative centre) by road. Bobry is the nearest rural locality.
