= Orlovo, Gus-Khrustalny District, Vladimir Oblast =

Orlovo Орлово
- Village
- Location within Vladimir Oblast Location within Russia
- Coordinates: 55°28′N 40°18′E
- Country: Russia
- Region: Vladimir Oblast
- District: Gus-Khrustalny District
- Time zone: UTC+3:00

Orlovo (Russian: Орлово) is a rural locality (a village) in Demidovskoye Rural Settlement, Gus-Khrustalny District, Vladimir Oblast, Russia. The population was 8 as of 2010.

== Geography ==
Orlovo is located 40 km southwest of Gus-Khrustalny (the district's administrative centre) by road. Mokroye is the nearest rural locality.
