= Ikshevo =

Ikshevo Икшево
- Village
- Location within Vladimir Oblast Location within Russia
- Coordinates: 55°26′N 41°07′E
- Country: Russia
- Region: Vladimir Oblast
- District: Gus-Khrustalny District
- Time zone: UTC+3:00

Ikshevo (Russian: Икшево) is a rural locality (a village) in Posyolok Zolotkovo, Gus-Khrustalny District, Vladimir Oblast, Russia. The population was 309 as of 2010.

== Geography ==
Ikshevo is located 53 km southeast of Gus-Khrustalny (the district's administrative centre) by road. Vasilyovo is the nearest rural locality.
