= Malinki =

Malinki Малинки
- Village
- Location within Vladimir Oblast Location within Russia
- Coordinates: 55°29′N 41°06′E
- Country: Russia
- Region: Vladimir Oblast
- District: Gus-Khrustalny District
- Time zone: UTC+3:00

Malinki (Russian: Малинки) is a rural locality (a village) in Posyolok Zolotkovo, Gus-Khrustalny District, Vladimir Oblast, Russia. The population was 38 as of 2010.

== Geography ==
Malinki is located 46 km southeast of Gus-Khrustalny (the district's administrative centre) by road. Zolotkovsky is the nearest rural locality.
