= Tolstikovo =

Tolstikovo Толстиково
- Village
- Location within Vladimir Oblast Location within Russia
- Coordinates: 55°45′N 40°58′E
- Country: Russia
- Region: Vladimir Oblast
- District: Gus-Khrustalny District
- Time zone: UTC+3:00

Tolstikovo (Russian: Толстиково) is a rural locality (a village) in Posyolok Krasnoye Ekho, Gus-Khrustalny District, Vladimir Oblast, Russia. The population was 53 as of 2010.

== Geography ==
Tolstikovo is located 33 km northeast of Gus-Khrustalny (the district's administrative centre) by road. Pershkovo is the nearest rural locality.
