= Pervomaysky, Gus-Khrustalny District, Vladimir Oblast =

Pervomaysky Первомайский
- Settlement
- Location within Vladimir Oblast Location within Russia
- Coordinates: 55°44′N 40°56′E
- Country: Russia
- Region: Vladimir Oblast
- District: Gus-Khrustalny District
- Time zone: UTC+3:00

Pervomaysky (Russian: Первомайский) is a rural locality (a settlement) in Posyolok Krasnoye Ekho, Gus-Khrustalny District, Vladimir Oblast, Russia. The population was 14 as of 2010.

== Geography ==
The village is located 22 km south-east from Krasnoye Ekho, 26 km north-east from Gus-Khrustalny.
