= Tasinsky =

Tasinsky Тасинский
- Settlement
- Location within Vladimir Oblast Location within Russia
- Coordinates: 55°37′N 40°09′E
- Country: Russia
- Region: Vladimir Oblast
- District: Gus-Khrustalny District
- Time zone: UTC+3:00

Tasinsky (Russian: Тасинский) is a rural locality (a settlement) in Posyolok Urshelsky, Gus-Khrustalny District, Vladimir Oblast, Russia. The population was 482 as of 2010. There are 10 streets.

== Geography ==
Tasinsky is located 39 km west of Gus-Khrustalny (the district's administrative centre) by road. Vasilevo is the nearest rural locality.
