= Talanovo =

Talanovo Таланово
- Village
- Location within Vladimir Oblast Location within Russia
- Coordinates: 55°15′N 41°02′E
- Country: Russia
- Region: Vladimir Oblast
- District: Gus-Khrustalny District
- Time zone: UTC+3:00

Talanovo (Russian: Таланово) is a rural locality (a village) in Kupreyevskoye Rural Settlement, Gus-Khrustalny District, Vladimir Oblast, Russia. The population was 443 as of 2010. There are 2 streets.

== Geography ==
Talanovo is located on Kolp (Gus tributary), 63 km southeast of Gus-Khrustalny (the district's administrative centre) by road. Kolp is the nearest rural locality.
