= Fomino =

Fomino Фомино
- Village
- Location within Vladimir Oblast Location within Russia
- Coordinates: 55°16′N 40°46′E
- Country: Russia
- Region: Vladimir Oblast
- District: Gus-Khrustalny District
- Time zone: UTC+3:00

Fomino (Russian: Фомино) is a rural locality (a village) in Ulyakhinskoye Rural Settlement, Gus-Khrustalny District, Vladimir Oblast, Russia. The population was 63 as of 2010.

== Geography ==
Fomino is located on the Gus River, 49 km south of Gus-Khrustalny (the district's administrative centre) by road. Parakhino is the nearest rural locality.
