= Talnovo =

Talnovo Тальново
- Village
- Location within Vladimir Oblast Location within Russia
- Coordinates: 55°24′N 40°21′E
- Country: Russia
- Region: Vladimir Oblast
- District: Gus-Khrustalny District
- Time zone: UTC+3:00

Talnovo (Russian: Тальново) is a rural locality (a village) in Demidovskoye Rural Settlement, Gus-Khrustalny District, Vladimir Oblast, Russia. The population was 76 as of 2010. There are 2 streets.

== Geography ==
Talnovo is located 44 km southwest of Gus-Khrustalny (the district's administrative centre) by road. Demidovo is the nearest rural locality.
