= Prokshino, Vladimir Oblast =

Prokshino Прокшино центавра Проксимо центавро
- Village
- Location within Vladimir Oblast Location within Russia
- Coordinates: 55°38′N 41°07′E
- Country: Russia
- Region: Vladimir Oblast
- District: Gus-Khrustalny District
- Time zone: UTC+3:00

Prokshino (Russian: Прокшино) is a rural locality (a village) in Posyolok Zolotkovo, Gus-Khrustalny District, Vladimir Oblast, Russia. The population was 12 as of 2010.

== Geography ==
Prokshino is located 35 km east of Gus-Khrustalny (the district's administrative centre) by road. Lesnikovo is the nearest locality.
