= Arsamaki =

Arsamaki Арсамаки
- Village
- Location within Vladimir Oblast Location within Russia
- Coordinates: 55°44′N 40°41′E
- Country: Russia
- Region: Vladimir Oblast
- District: Gus-Khrustalny District
- Time zone: UTC+3:00

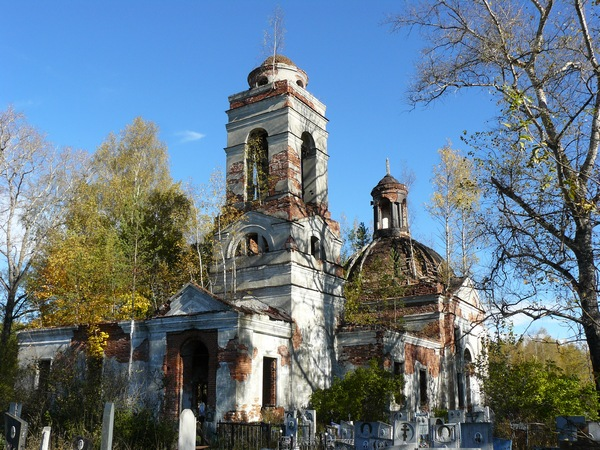

Arsamaki (Russian: Арсамаки) is a rural locality (a village) in Posyolok Anopino, Gus-Khrustalny District, Vladimir Oblast, Russia. The population was 21 as of (2021 census); 15 as of 2010.

== Geography ==
Arsamaki is located 18 km north of Gus-Khrustalny (the district's administrative centre) by road. Zhary is the nearest rural locality.
