= Potapovskaya =

Potapovskaya Потаповская
- Village
- Location within Vladimir Oblast Location within Russia
- Coordinates: 55°49′N 40°36′E
- Country: Russia
- Region: Vladimir Oblast
- District: Gus-Khrustalny District
- Time zone: UTC+3:00

Potapovskaya (Russian: Потаповская) is a rural locality (a village) in Posyolok Ivanishchi, Gus-Khrustalny District, Vladimir Oblast, Russia. The population was 20 as of 2010.

== Geography ==
Potapovskaya is located 34 km north of Gus-Khrustalny (the district's administrative centre) by road. Morugino is the nearest rural locality.
