= Vasilyovo (Posyolok Urshelsky), Gus-Khrustalny District, Vladimir Oblast =

Vasilyovo Василёво
- Village
- Location within Vladimir Oblast Location within Russia
- Coordinates: 55°36′N 40°15′E
- Country: Russia
- Region: Vladimir Oblast
- District: Gus-Khrustalny District
- Time zone: UTC+3:00

Vasilyovo (Russian: Василёво) is a rural locality (a village) in Posyolok Urshelsky, Gus-Khrustalny District, Vladimir Oblast, Russia. The population was 4 as of 2010.

== Geography ==
The village is located 10 km south-east from Urshelsky, 26 km west from Gus-Khrustalny.
