= Maklaki =

Maklaki Маклаки
- Village
- Location within Vladimir Oblast Location within Russia
- Coordinates: 55°22′N 40°17′E
- Country: Russia
- Region: Vladimir Oblast
- District: Gus-Khrustalny District
- Time zone: UTC+3:00

Maklaki (Russian: Маклаки) is a rural locality (a village) in Demidovskoye Rural Settlement, Gus-Khrustalny District, Vladimir Oblast, Russia. The population was 12 as of 2010.

== Geography ==
Maklaki is located 43 km southwest of Gus-Khrustalny (the district's administrative centre) by road. Ovintsy is the nearest rural locality.
