= Rastovo, Gus-Khrustalny District, Vladimir Oblast =

Rastovo Растово
- Village
- Location within Vladimir Oblast Location within Russia
- Coordinates: 55°19′N 40°34′E
- Country: Russia
- Region: Vladimir Oblast
- District: Gus-Khrustalny District
- Time zone: UTC+3:00

Rastovo (Russian: Растово) is a rural locality (a village) in Posyolok Velikodvorsky, Gus-Khrustalny District, Vladimir Oblast, Russia. The population was 2 as of 2010.

== Geography ==
Rastovo is located on the Ninur River, 49 km south of Gus-Khrustalny (the district's administrative centre) by road. Zalesye is the nearest rural locality.
