= Mezinovsky =

Mezinovsky Мезиновский
- Settlement
- Location within Vladimir Oblast Location within Russia
- Coordinates: 55°28′N 40°24′E
- Country: Russia
- Region: Vladimir Oblast
- District: Gus-Khrustalny District
- Time zone: UTC+3:00

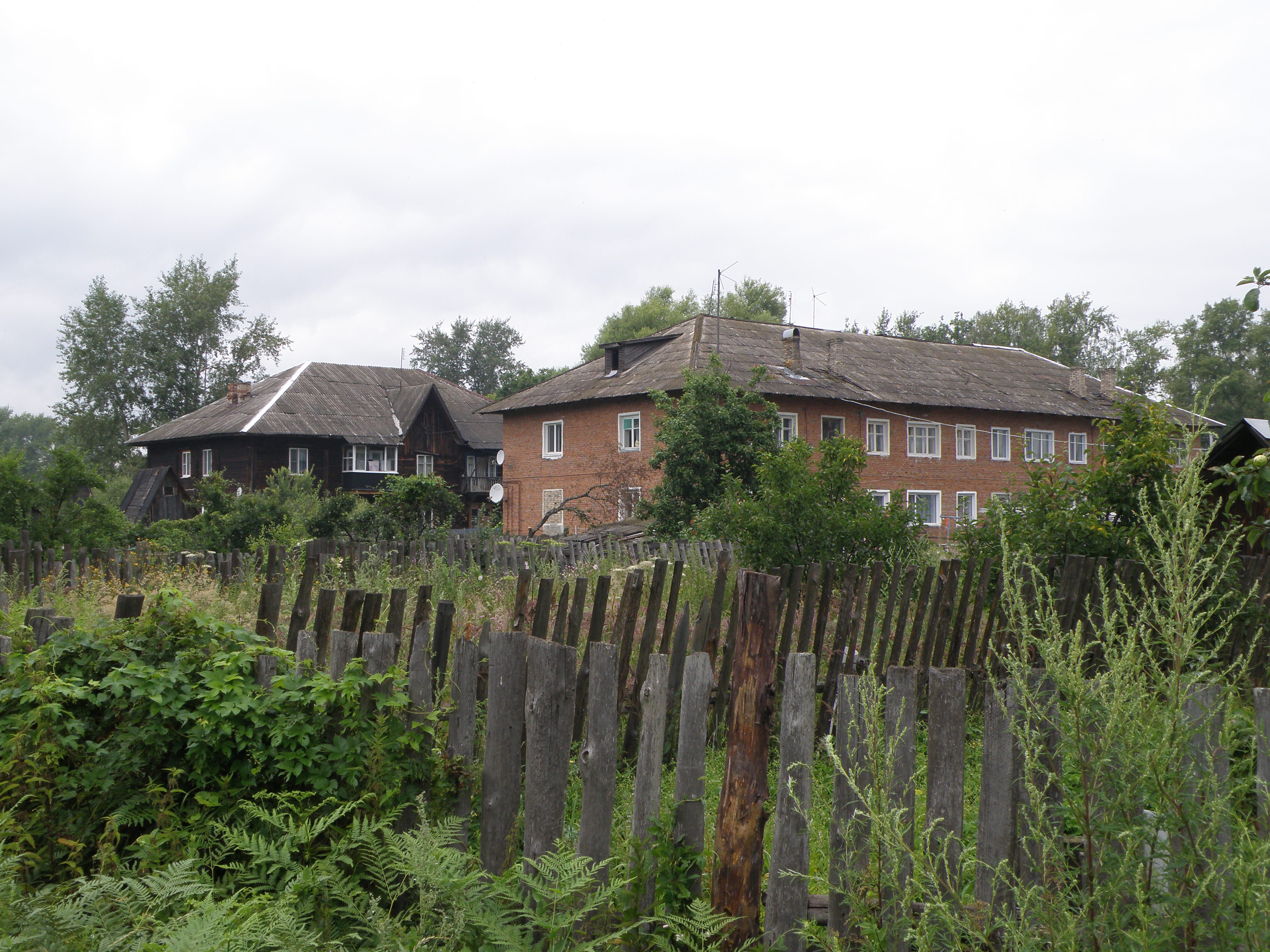
Apartment buildings in Mezinovsky settlement.

Mezinovsky (Russian: Мезиновский) is a rural locality (a settlement) and the administrative center of Posyolok Mezinovsky, Gus-Khrustalny District, Vladimir Oblast, Russia. The population was 2,063 as of 2010. There are 32 streets.

== Geography ==
Mezinovsky is located 28 km southwest of Gus-Khrustalny (the district's administrative centre) by road. Torfoprodukt is the nearest rural locality.
