= Chiur =

Chiur Чиур
- Village
- Location within Vladimir Oblast Location within Russia
- Coordinates: 55°38′N 41°03′E
- Country: Russia
- Region: Vladimir Oblast
- District: Gus-Khrustalny District
- Time zone: UTC+3:00

Chiur (Russian: Чиур) is a rural locality (a village) in Posyolok Zolotkovo, Gus-Khrustalny District, Vladimir Oblast, Russia. The population was 6 as of 2010.

== Geography ==
Chiur is located on the Sudogda River, 31 km east of Gus-Khrustalny (the district's administrative centre) by road. Narmoch is the nearest rural locality.
