= Potapkovo =

Potapkovo Потапково
- Village
- Location within Vladimir Oblast Location within Russia
- Coordinates: 55°29′N 41°17′E
- Country: Russia
- Region: Vladimir Oblast
- District: Gus-Khrustalny District
- Time zone: UTC+3:00

Potapkovo (Russian: Потапково) is a rural locality (a village) in Posyolok Dobryatino, Gus-Khrustalny District, Vladimir Oblast, Russia. The population was 21 as of 2010.

== Geography ==
Potapkovo is located 60 km southeast of Gus-Khrustalny (the district's administrative centre) by road. Dobryatino is the nearest rural locality.
