= Chyokovo =

Chyokovo Чёково
- Village
- Location within Vladimir Oblast Location within Russia
- Coordinates: 55°36′N 41°00′E
- Country: Russia
- Region: Vladimir Oblast
- District: Gus-Khrustalny District
- Time zone: UTC+3:00

Chyokovo (Russian: Чёково) is a rural locality (a village) in Posyolok Zolotkovo, Gus-Khrustalny District, Vladimir Oblast, Russia. The population was 11 as of 2010.

== Geography ==
Chyokovo is located 25 km east of Gus-Khrustalny (the district's administrative centre) by road. Pochinki is the nearest rural locality.
