= Vyoshki, Vladimir Oblast =

Vyoshki Вёшки
- Selo
- Location within Vladimir Oblast Location within Russia
- Coordinates: 55°39′N 40°51′E
- Country: Russia
- Region: Vladimir Oblast
- District: Gus-Khrustalny District
- Time zone: UTC+3:00

Vyoshki (Russian: Вёшки, IPA: [ˈvʲɵʂkʲɪ], [ˈvʲeʂkʲɪ]) is a rural locality (a selo) in Posyolok Anopino, Gus-Khrustalny District, Vladimir Oblast, Russia. The population was 120 as of 2010. There are 2 streets.

== Geography ==
Vyoshki is located 17 km northeast of Gus-Khrustalny (the district's administrative centre) by road. Fedotovo is the nearest rural locality.
