= Krasny Posyolok =

Krasny Posyolok Красный Посёлок
- Village
- Location within Vladimir Oblast Location within Russia
- Coordinates: 55°23′N 40°44′E
- Country: Russia
- Region: Vladimir Oblast
- District: Gus-Khrustalny District
- Time zone: UTC+3:00

Krasny Posyolok (Russian: Красный Посёлок) is a rural locality (a village) in Ulyakhinskoye Rural Settlement, Gus-Khrustalny District, Vladimir Oblast, Russia. The population was 193 as of 2010.

== Geography ==
Krasny Posyolok is located on the Ninor River, 35 km south of Gus-Khrustalny (the district's administrative centre) by road. Sivtsevo is the nearest rural locality.
