= Zolotkovo =

Zolotkovo Золотково
- Settlement
- Location within Vladimir Oblast Location within Russia
- Coordinates: 55°31′N 41°06′E
- Country: Russia
- Region: Vladimir Oblast
- District: Gus-Khrustalny District
- Time zone: UTC+3:00

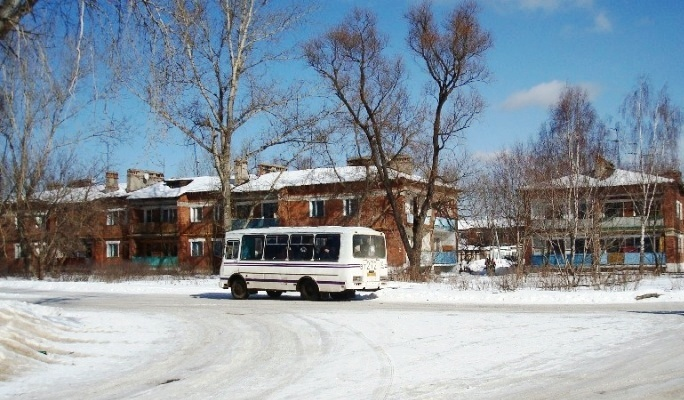
Zolotkovo village

Zolotkovo (Russian: Золотково) is a rural locality (a settlement) and the administrative center of Posyolok Zolotkovo, Gus-Khrustalny District, Vladimir Oblast, Russia. The population was 2,727 as of 2010. There are 28 streets.

== Geography ==
Zolotkovo is located 43 km southeast of Gus-Khrustalny (the district's administrative centre) by road. Zolotkovsky is the nearest rural locality.
