= Oblepikha =

Oblepikha Облепиха
- Village
- Location within Vladimir Oblast Location within Russia
- Coordinates: 55°39′N 40°45′E
- Country: Russia
- Region: Vladimir Oblast
- District: Gus-Khrustalny District
- Time zone: UTC+3:00

Oblepikha (Russian: Облепиха) is a rural locality (a village) in Posyolok Anopino, Gus-Khrustalny District, Vladimir Oblast, Russia. The population was 89 as of 2010. There are 2 streets.

== Geography ==
The village is located 58 km SSE from Vladimir, 7.5 km north-east from Gus-Khrustalny.
