= Tikhonovo =

Tikhonovo Тихоново
- Village
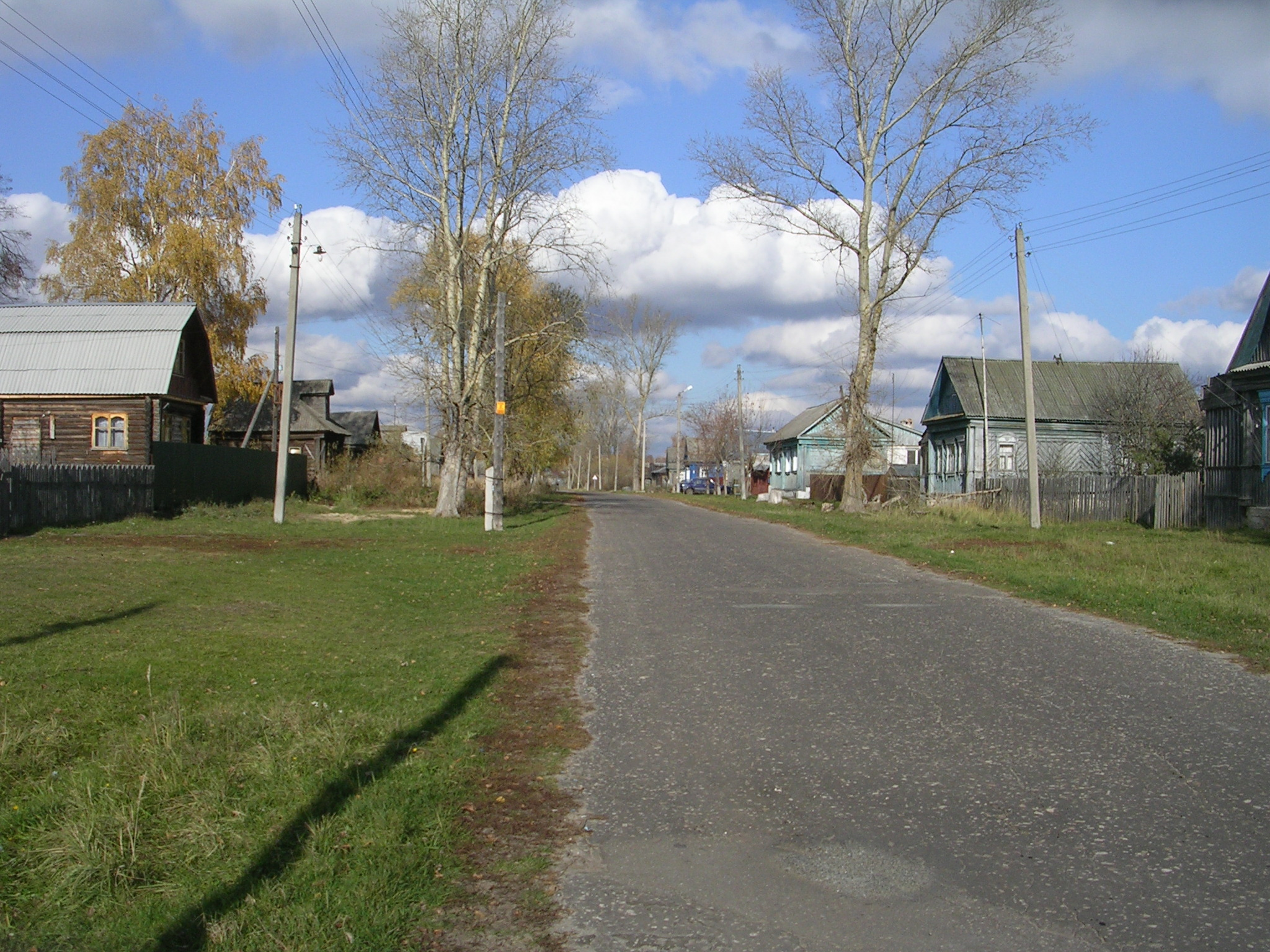
- Tikhonovo Street

- Location within Vladimir Oblast Location within Russia
- Coordinates: 55°33′N 40°15′E
- Country: Russia
- Region: Vladimir Oblast
- District: Gus-Khrustalny District
- Time zone: UTC+3:00

Tikhonovo (Russian: Тихоново) is a rural locality (a village) in Posyolok Urshelsky, Gus-Khrustalny District, Vladimir Oblast, Russia. The population was 124 as of 2010. There are 2 streets.

== Geography ==
Tikhonovo is located on the right bank of the Buzha River, 36 km west of Gus-Khrustalny (the district's administrative centre) by road. Yagodino is the nearest rural locality.
