= Golovari =

Golovari Головари
- Village
- Location within Vladimir Oblast Location within Russia
- Coordinates: 55°31′N 40°30′E
- Country: Russia
- Region: Vladimir Oblast
- District: Gus-Khrustalny District
- Time zone: UTC+3:00

Golovari (Russian: Головари) is a rural locality (a village) in Posyolok Mezinovsky, Gus-Khrustalny District, Vladimir Oblast, Russia. The population was 17 as of 2010.

== Geography ==
Golovari is located 19 km southwest of Gus-Khrustalny (the district's administrative centre) by road. Nechayevskaya is the nearest rural locality.
