= Timenka =

Timenka Тименка
- Village
- Location within Vladimir Oblast Location within Russia
- Coordinates: 55°41′N 40°39′E
- Country: Russia
- Region: Vladimir Oblast
- District: Gus-Khrustalny District
- Time zone: UTC+3:00

Timenka (Russian: Тименка) is a rural locality (a village) in Posyolok Anopino, Gus-Khrustalny District, Vladimir Oblast, Russia. The population was 120 as of 2010.

== Geography ==
Timenka is located 1.5 km south from Anopino, 18 km north of Gus-Khrustalny (the district's administrative centre) by road. Anopino is the nearest rural locality.
