= Zalesye, Vladimir Oblast =

Zalesye Залесье
- Village
- Location within Vladimir Oblast Location within Russia
- Coordinates: 55°18′N 40°38′E
- Country: Russia
- Region: Vladimir Oblast
- District: Gus-Khrustalny District
- Time zone: UTC+3:00

Zalesye (Russian: Залесье) is a rural locality (a village) in Posyolok Velikodvorsky, Gus-Khrustalny District, Vladimir Oblast, Russia. The population was 122 as of 2010. There are 2 streets.

== Geography ==
Zalesye is located on the Ninur River, 44 km south of Gus-Khrustalny (the district's administrative centre) by road. Velikodvorsky is the nearest rural locality.
