= Popovichi =

Popovichi Поповичи
- Village
- Location within Vladimir Oblast Location within Russia
- Coordinates: 55°44′N 40°46′E
- Country: Russia
- Region: Vladimir Oblast
- District: Gus-Khrustalny District
- Time zone: UTC+3:00

Popovichi (Russian: Поповичи) is a rural locality (a village) in Posyolok Anopino, Gus-Khrustalny District, Vladimir Oblast, Russia. The population was 1 as of 2010. There is 1 street.

== Geography ==
Popovichi is located 18 km north of Gus-Khrustalny (the district's administrative centre) by road. Vashutino is the nearest rural locality.
