= Miltsevo =

Miltsevo Мильцево
- Village
- Location within Vladimir Oblast Location within Russia
- Coordinates: 55°28′N 40°22′E
- Country: Russia
- Region: Vladimir Oblast
- District: Gus-Khrustalny District
- Time zone: UTC+3:00

Miltsevo (Russian: Мильцево) is a rural locality (a village) in Posyolok Mezinovsky, Gus-Khrustalny District, Vladimir Oblast, Russia. The population was 29 as of 2010.

== Geography ==
Miltsevo is located 30 km southwest of Gus-Khrustalny (the district's administrative centre) by road. Torfoprodukt is the nearest rural locality.
