= Zhary, Gus-Khrustalny District, Vladimir Oblast =

Zhary Жары
- Village
- Location within Vladimir Oblast Location within Russia
- Coordinates: 55°43′N 40°40′E
- Country: Russia
- Region: Vladimir Oblast
- District: Gus-Khrustalny District
- Time zone: UTC+3:00

Zhary (Russian: Жары) is a rural locality (a village) in Posyolok Anopino, Gus-Khrustalny District, Vladimir Oblast, Russia. The population was 24 as of 2010.

== Geography ==
Zhary is located 20 km north of Gus-Khrustalny (the district's administrative centre) by road. Anopino is the nearest rural locality.
