= Lesnikovo =

Lesnikovo Лесниково
- Village
- Location within Vladimir Oblast Location within Russia
- Coordinates: 55°36′N 41°07′E
- Country: Russia
- Region: Vladimir Oblast
- District: Gus-Khrustalny District
- Time zone: UTC+3:00

Lesnikovo (Russian: Лесниково) is a rural locality (a village) in Posyolok Zolotkovo, Gus-Khrustalny District, Vladimir Oblast, Russia. The population was 399 as of 2010. There are 4 streets.

== Geography ==
Lesnikovo is located 32 km east of Gus-Khrustalny (the district's administrative centre) by road. Narmoch is the nearest rural locality.
