= Anopino =

Anopino Анопино
- Settlement
- Location within Vladimir Oblast Location within Russia
- Coordinates: 55°41′N 40°39′E
- Country: Russia
- Region: Vladimir Oblast
- District: Gus-Khrustalny District
- Time zone: UTC+3:00

Anopino (Russian: Ано́пино) is a rural locality (a settlement) and the administrative center of Posyolok Anopino, Gus-Khrustalny District, Vladimir Oblast, Russia. The population was 2,171 as of (2021 census); 2,043 as of 2010. There are 17 streets.

== Geography ==
Anopino is located 23 km north of Gus-Khrustalny (the district's administrative centre) by road. Timenka is the nearest rural locality.
