= Sivtsevo =

Sivtsevo Сивцево
- Village
- Location within Vladimir Oblast Location within Russia
- Coordinates: 55°22′N 40°45′E
- Country: Russia
- Region: Vladimir Oblast
- District: Gus-Khrustalny District
- Time zone: UTC+3:00

Sivtsevo (Russian: Сивцево) is a rural locality (a village) in Ulyakhinskoye Rural Settlement, Gus-Khrustalny District, Vladimir Oblast, Russia. The population was 24 as of 2010.

== Geography ==
Sivtsevo is located on the Gus River, 38 km south of Gus-Khrustalny (the district's administrative centre) by road. Krasny Posyolok is the nearest rural locality.
