= Kryukovo, Vladimir Oblast =

Kryukovo Крюково
- Selo
- Location within Vladimir Oblast Location within Russia
- Coordinates: 55°38′N 41°16′E
- Country: Russia
- Region: Vladimir Oblast
- District: Gus-Khrustalny District
- Time zone: UTC+3:00

Kryukovo (Russian: Крю́ково) is a rural locality (a selo) in Posyolok Zolotkovo, Gus-Khrustalny District, Vladimir Oblast, Russia. The population was 15 as of 2010.

== Geography ==
Kryukovo is located 45 km east of Gus-Khrustalny (the district's administrative centre) by road. Lazarevka is the nearest rural locality.
