= Narmoch =

Narmoch Нармочь
- Village
- Location within Vladimir Oblast Location within Russia
- Coordinates: 55°36′N 41°03′E
- Country: Russia
- Region: Vladimir Oblast
- District: Gus-Khrustalny District
- Time zone: UTC+3:00

Narmoch (Russian: Нармочь) is a rural locality (a village) in Posyolok Zolotkovo, Gus-Khrustalny District, Vladimir Oblast, Russia. The population was 77 as of 2010.

== Geography ==
Narmoch is located 29 km east of Gus-Khrustalny (the district's administrative centre) by road. Lesnikovo is the nearest rural locality.
