= Ilyino, Gus-Khrustalny District, Vladimir Oblast =

Ilyino Ильино
- Village
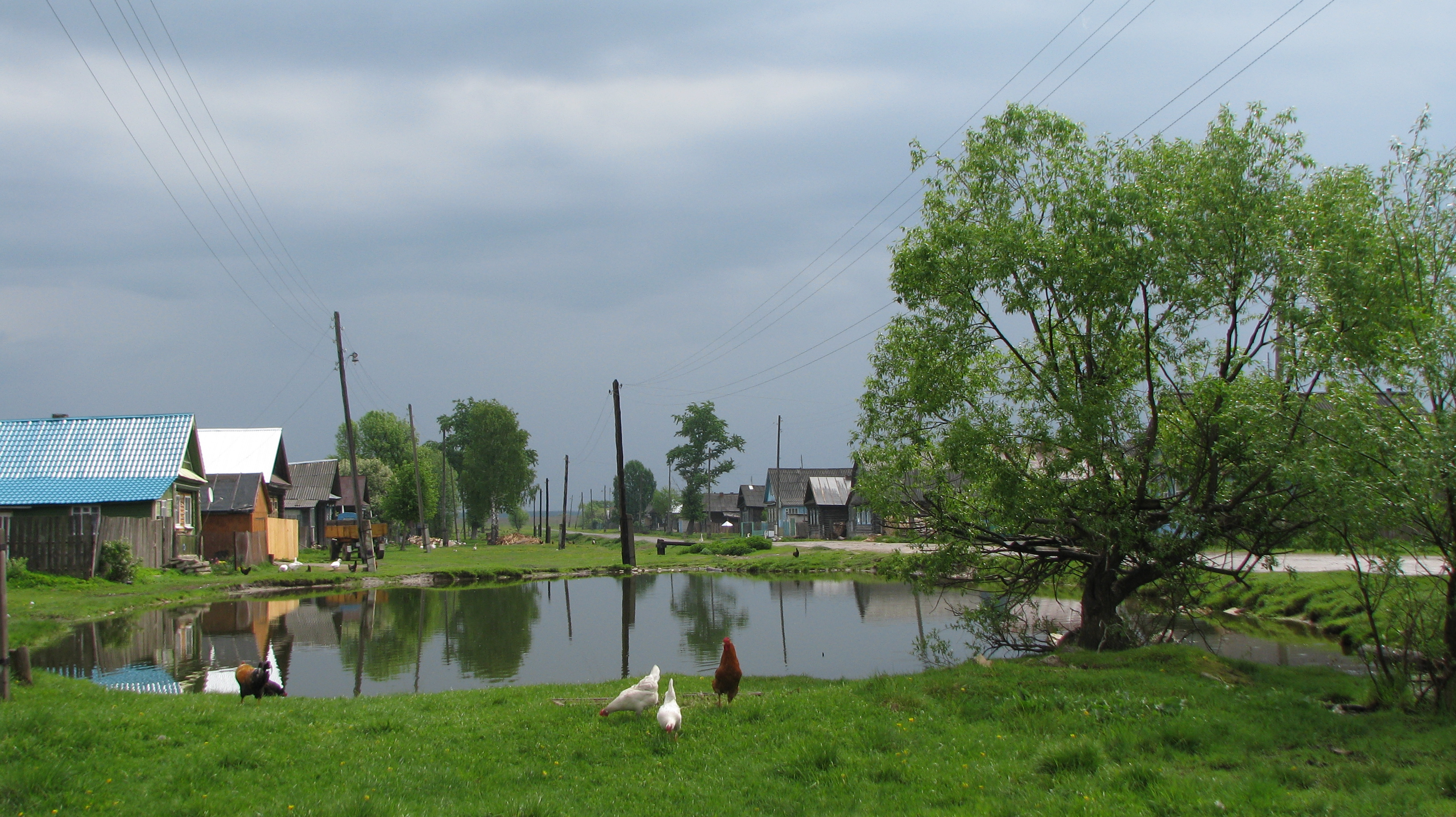
- Il'ino Village

- Location within Vladimir Oblast Location within Russia
- Coordinates: 55°31′N 41°13′E
- Country: Russia
- Region: Vladimir Oblast
- District: Gus-Khrustalny District
- Time zone: UTC+3:00

Ilyino (Russian: Ильино́) is a rural locality (a village) in Posyolok Dobryatino, Gus-Khrustalny District, Vladimir Oblast, Russia. The population was 414 as of 2010. There are 7 streets.

== Geography ==
Ilyino is located 56 km southeast of Gus-Khrustalny (the district's administrative centre) by road. Alfyorovo is the nearest rural locality.
