= Fyodorovka, Gus-Khrustalny District, Vladimir Oblast =

Fyodorovka Фёдоровка
- Village
- Location within Vladimir Oblast Location within Russia
- Coordinates: 55°48′N 40°43′E
- Country: Russia
- Region: Vladimir Oblast
- District: Gus-Khrustalny District
- Time zone: UTC+3:00

Fyodorovka (Russian: Фёдоровка) is a rural locality (a village) in Posyolok Krasnoye Ekho, Gus-Khrustalny District, Vladimir Oblast, Russia. The population was 154 as of 2010.

== Geography ==
Fyodorovka is located 28 km north of Gus-Khrustalny (the district's administrative centre) by road. Krasnoye Ekho is the nearest rural locality.
