= Gusevskoye Urban Settlement =

Gusevskoye Urban Settlement is the name of several municipal formations in Russia.

Modern entities

- Gusevskoye Urban Settlement, a municipal formation which the Work Settlement of Gus-Zhelezny in Kasimovsky District of Ryazan Oblast is incorporated as

Historical entities

- Gusevskoye Urban Settlement, a municipal formation which the town of district significance of Gusev in Gusevsky District of Kaliningrad Oblast was incorporated as; it was abolished when Gusevsky Municipal District was transformed into Gusevsky Urban Okrug in June 2013

== See also ==
- Gusevsky (disambiguation)
