= Gusevsky (inhabited locality) =

Gusevsky (Russian: Гусевский; masculine), Gusevskaya (Гусевская; feminine), or Gusevskoye (Гусевское; neuter) is the name of several inhabited localities in Russia.

Urban localities

- Gusevsky, Vladimir Oblast, a settlement under the administrative jurisdiction of the Town of Gus-Khrustalny in Vladimir Oblast

Rural localities

- Gusevsky, Nizhny Novgorod Oblast, a pochinok in Akatovsky Selsoviet under the administrative jurisdiction of the town of oblast significance of Shakhunya in Nizhny Novgorod Oblast; 57°37′N 46°37′E
- Gusevsky, Tambov Oblast, a settlement in Nizhneshibryaysky Selsoviet of Uvarovsky District in Tambov Oblast
- Gusevskaya, a village in Tarasovsky Selsoviet of Plesetsky District in Arkhangelsk Oblast
