= Gus (river) =

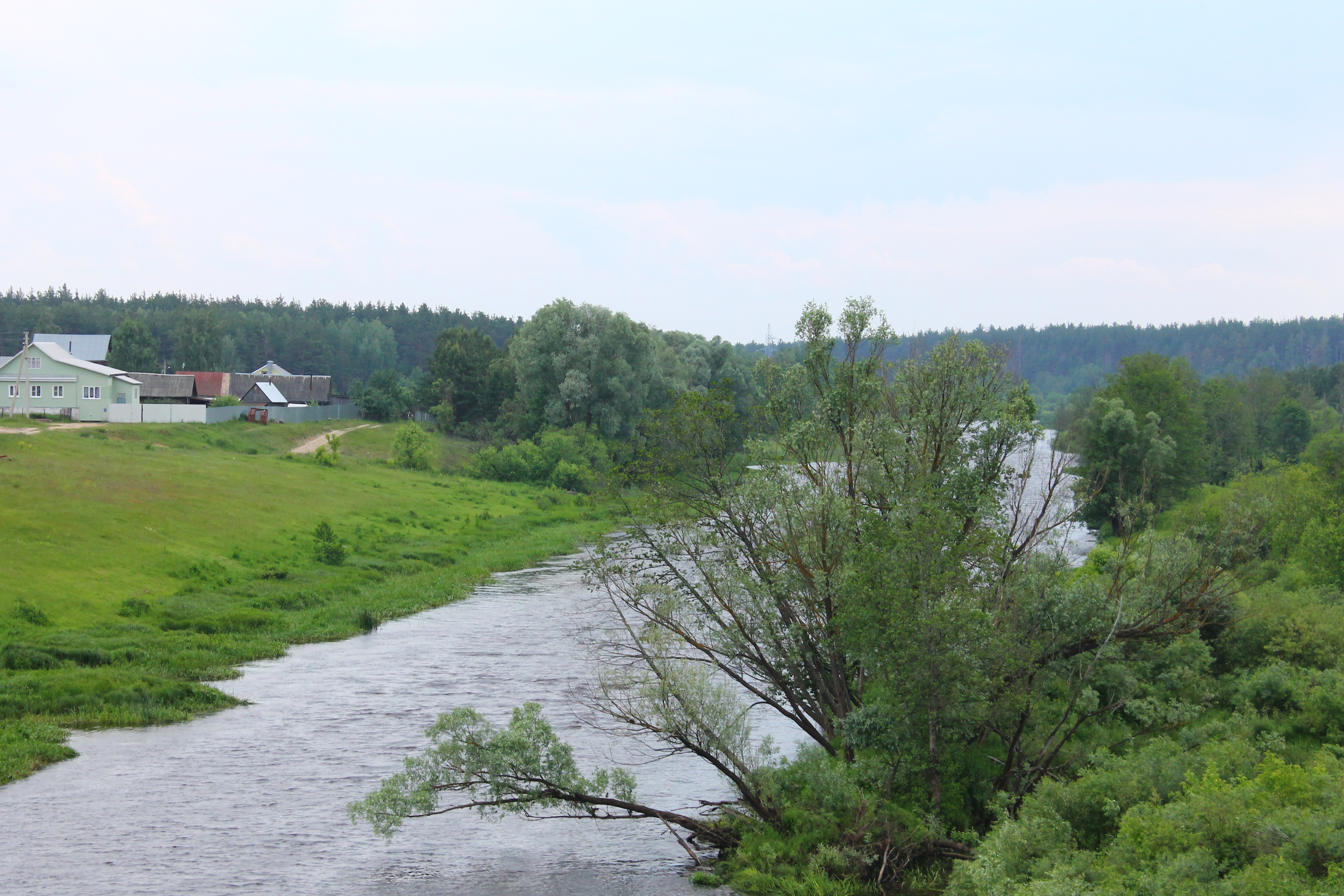
- Native name: Гусь (Russian)

Location
- Country: Russia

Physical characteristics
- Mouth: Oka
  - coordinates: 54°59′57″N 41°11′12″E
- Length: 147 km (91 mi)
- Basin size: 3,910 km^{2} (1,510 sq mi)

Basin features
- Progression: Oka→ Volga→ Caspian Sea

The Gus (Russian: Гусь, lit. goose) is a river in Vladimir and Ryazan Oblasts, Russia. It is a left tributary of the Oka. It is 147 kilometres (91 mi) long, and has a drainage basin of 3,910 square kilometres (1,510 sq mi).

The names of several inhabited localities locating along the river's bank are derived from the river's name (Gus-Khrustalny, Gusevsky, Gus-Zhelezny, Gus-Parakhino, Gusevsky Pogost). According to Vladimir Nikonov, the literal translation of the river's name as "goose" is a folk etymology, and the origin of the name lies in an unknown substrate language from which some other local toponyms ending with "-us" (i.e. Charus, Iberdus etc.) also derive.

On the river Gus the Gus Crystal plant is located. It is world-famous production site of original Russian crystal which gave the name to the Gus-Khrustalny city.
