= Gusevsky =

Gusevsky (masculine), Gusevskaya (feminine), or Gusevskoye (neuter) may refer to:

- Gusevsky District, a district of Kaliningrad Oblast, Russia
- Gusevsky Urban Okrug, a municipal formation which Gusevsky District of Kaliningrad Oblast, Russia is incorporated as
- Gusevskoye Urban Settlement, several municipal urban settlements in Russia
- Gusevsky (inhabited locality) (Gusevskaya, Gusevskoye), several inhabited localities in Russia
