= Gus Crystal =

Russian glass manufacturer

- Company type: Private limited company
- Founded: 1756
- Founder: Akim Maltsov
- Headquarters: Gus-Khrustalny, Vladimir Oblast, Russia
- Website: goose-crystal.ru

Gus Crystal (Russian: Гусевской хрустальный завод) is a Russian manufacturer of glass (Lead glass or so-called "crystal"). The company is the oldest surviving manufacturer of Russian crystal and was founded in 1756 on the Gus River. The company gave its name to the town of Gus-Khrustalny and its district. Founded by Akim Maltsov, a merchant from Oryol region. From 2013 the plant was known as Gusevskaya Crystal Plant and named after Akim Maltsov.

== History ==
In the summer of 1756, a merchant from Oryol region, Akim Maltsev founded a glass factory in the Vladimir Province of the Moscow Governorate, near the Gus River. Initially, the factory produced only simple glasses and tumblers, but in 1830, the founder's heir, Ivan Maltsev, established crystal production, making it as high-quality as Bohemian crystal but more affordable.

For a century and a half after its founding, the factory has been operated successfully and expanded. In the final years of the Russian Empire, the Maltsev heirs not only renovated the factory but also reconstructed much of the city, building red brick houses for workers that still stand today, as well as individual cottages for management and the St. George Cathedral. The construction of the cathedral involved the participation of Leonty Benois and Viktor Vasnetsov. Today, the cathedral houses a crystal museum, which displays thousands of unique pieces produced by the Gus Crystal Factory.

After the October Revolution of 1917 and the resulting devastation, the factory ceased operations. Production was only resumed in 1923 after a visit to Gus-Khrustalny by Mikhail Kalinin and the allocation of special funding. During the Soviet era, the factory became known for producing faceted glasses, which were presumably designed by Vera Mukhina. The factory produced them in quantities of tens of millions. At the same time, the factory also produced artistic glass, including multicolored glass, and glassblowers continued their work there. Additionally, the factory produced products incorporating colored Venetian threads.

=== Recent history ===
In the 1990s, the factory was privatized, with each workshop becoming its own legal entity. Each of these entities not only supplied products to the neighboring workshop but sold them, leading to a markup at each stage and ultimately making the final product's price uncompetitive. At the same time, criminal interests became involved with the factory, focusing on immediate profit rather than the development of the enterprise. As a result, one by one, the workshops declared themselves financially insolvent, and in 2000, the main factory declared bankruptcy as well.

On January 19, 2012, the factory in its previous form ceased to exist, and the last hundred employees were laid off.

On December 26, 2013, crystal production was resumed at the factory known as "Gusevsky Crystal Factory named after Akim Maltsev". New equipment was installed in the old workshop, and instead of traditional vases and glasses, the production of handcrafted crystal art pieces by individual orders was established.
