= Zakolpye (station) =

Zakolpye Заколпье
- Station
- Location within Vladimir Oblast Location within Russia
- Coordinates: 55°30′N 40°57′E
- Country: Russia
- Region: Vladimir Oblast
- District: Gus-Khrustalny District
- Time zone: UTC+3:00

Zakolpye (Russian: Заколпье) is a rural locality (a station) in Grigoryevskoye Rural Settlement, Gus-Khrustalny District, Vladimir Oblast, Russia. The population was 352 as of 2010. There are 2 streets.

== Geography ==
The village is located 25 km south-east from Gus-Khrustalny.
