= Vasilyovo (Posyolok Zolotkovo), Gus-Khrustalny District, Vladimir Oblast =

Vasilyovo Василёво
- Village
- Location within Vladimir Oblast Location within Russia
- Coordinates: 55°25′N 41°09′E
- Country: Russia
- Region: Vladimir Oblast
- District: Gus-Khrustalny District
- Time zone: UTC+3:00

Vasilyovo (Russian: Василёво) is a rural locality (a village) in Posyolok Zolotkovo, Gus-Khrustalny District, Vladimir Oblast, Russia. The population was 158 as of 2010.

== Geography ==
The village is located 14 km south from Zolotkovo, 49 km south-east from Gus-Khrustalny.
