= Alexandrovka (Posyolok Anopino), Gus-Khrustalny District, Vladimir Oblast =

Alexandrovka Александровка
- Village
- Location within Vladimir Oblast Location within Russia
- Coordinates: 55°40′N 40°37′E
- Country: Russia
- Region: Vladimir Oblast
- District: Gus-Khrustalny District
- Time zone: UTC+3:00

Alexandrovka (Russian: Алекса́ндровка) is a rural locality (a village) in Posyolok Anopino, Gus-Khrustalny District, Vladimir Oblast, Russia. The population was 91 (2021 census), 73 as of 2010. There are 4 streets.

== Geography ==
The village is located 4 km south-west of Anopino, 8 km north of Gus-Khrustalny.
