= Panfilovo, Gus-Khrustalny, Vladimir Oblast =

Panfilovo Панфилово
- Settlement
- Location within Vladimir Oblast Location within Russia
- Coordinates: 55°43′N 40°33′E
- Country: Russia
- Region: Vladimir Oblast
- District: Gus-Khrustalny
- Time zone: UTC+3:00

Panfilovo (Russian: Панфилово) is a rural locality (a settlement) in Gus-Khrustalny, Vladimir Oblast, Russia. The population was 132 as of 2010. There are 2 streets.
