= Gus-Zhelezny =

Gus-Zhelezny Гусь-Железный
- Urban-type settlement
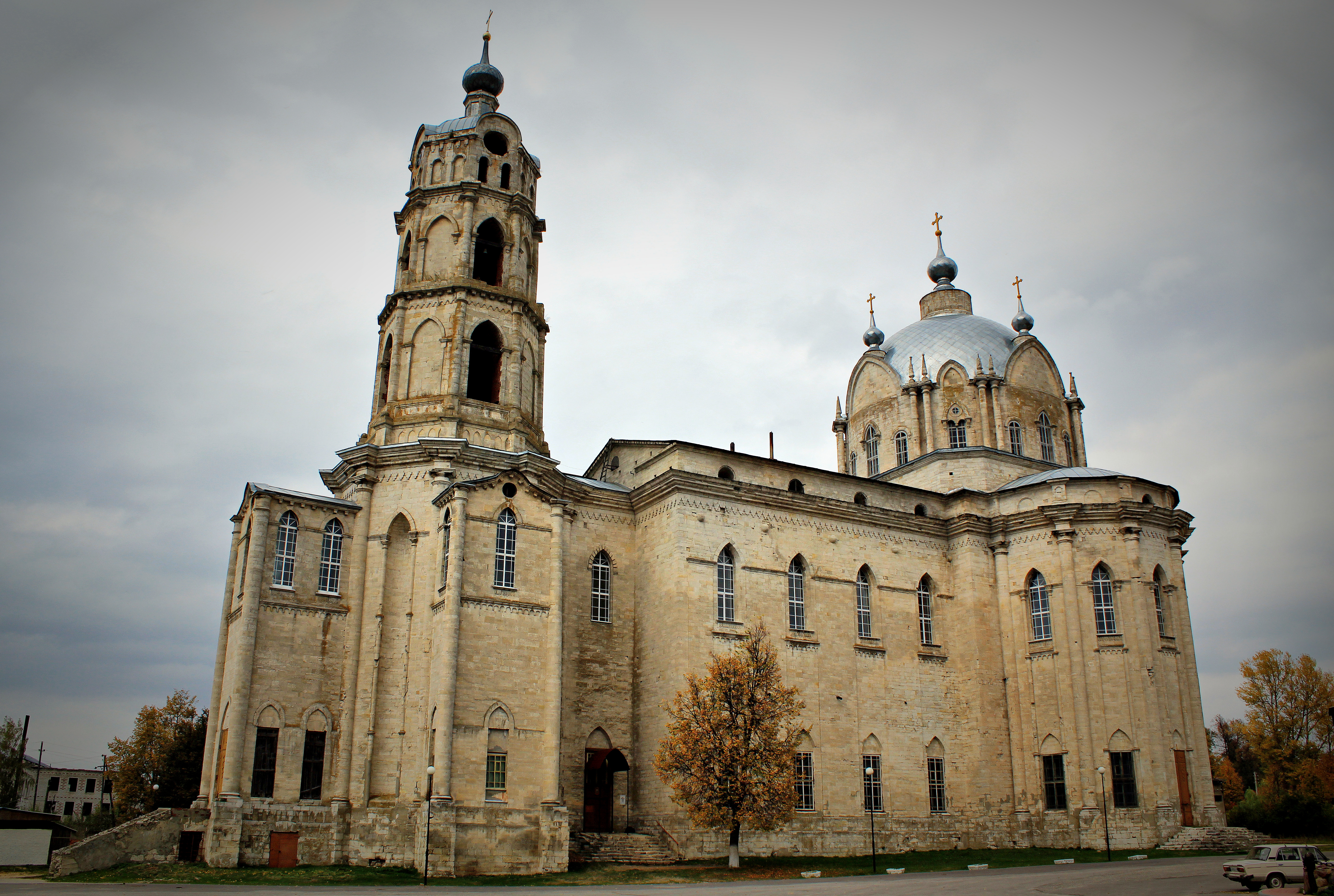
- Trinity Cathedral in Gus-Zhelezny

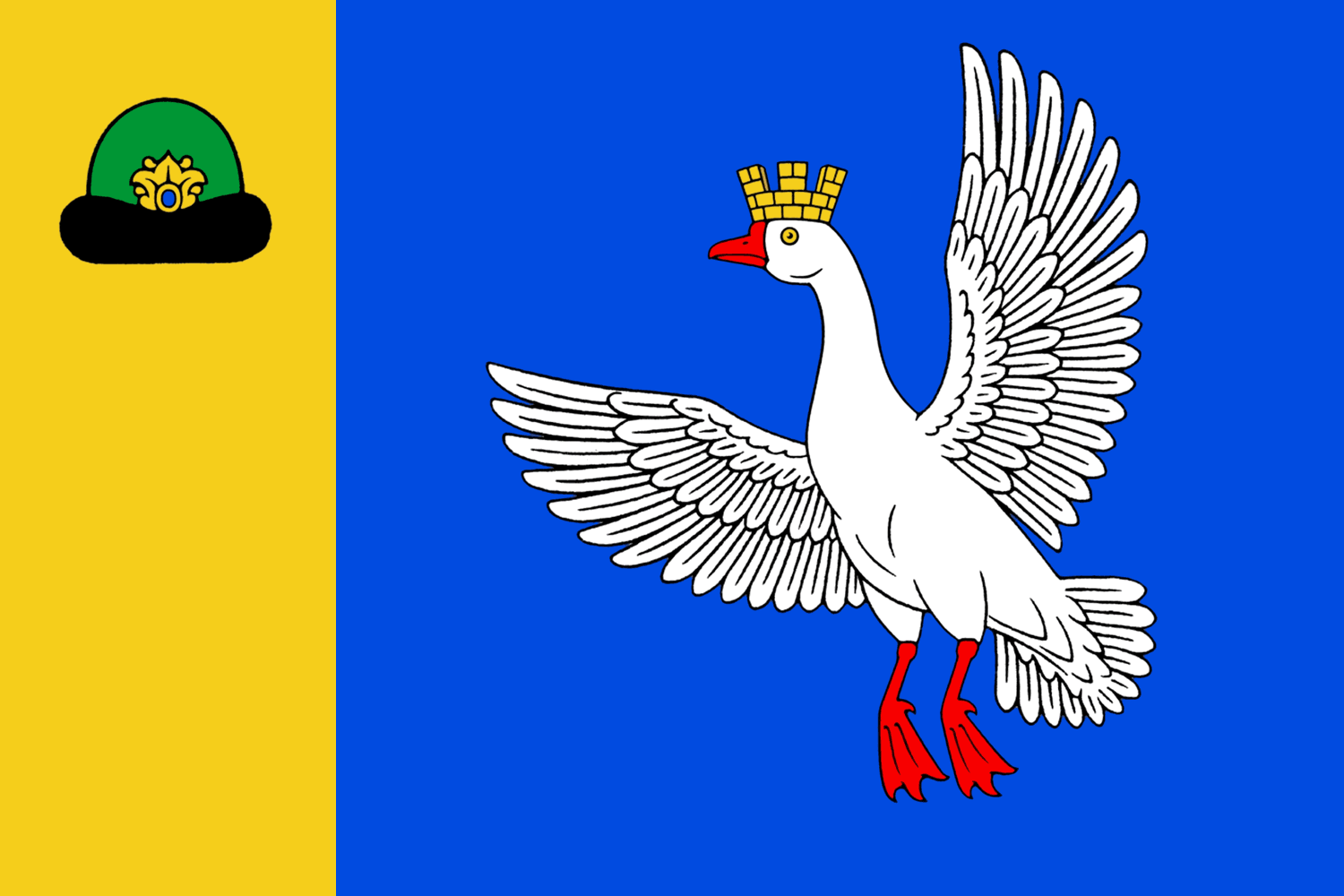
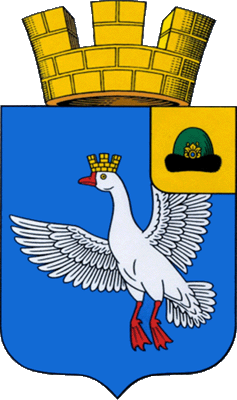
- Flag Coat of arms
- Interactive map of Gus-Zhelezny
- Location of Gus-Zhelezny Gus-Zhelezny (Ryazan Oblast)
- Coordinates: 55°03′N 41°09′E
- Country: Russia
- Federal subject: Ryazan Oblast
- Administrative district: Kasimovsky District

Population (2010 Census)
  - Total: 2,115
  - Estimate (2023): 1,841 (−13%)
- Time zone: UTC+3 (MSK)
- Postal code: 391320
- OKTMO ID: 61608154051

Gus-Zhelezny (Russian: Гусь-Желе́зный, lit. iron goose) is an urban locality (an urban-type settlement) in Kasimovsky District of Ryazan Oblast, Russia. Population: 2,115 (2010 census); 2,442 (2002 census); 2,809 (1989 Soviet census).

It was founded in the 18th century on the Gus River's bank.

The main point of interest of Gus-Zhelezny is the 19th century Russian orthodox Trinity Cathedral, built in a rare for Russia Gothic Revival style with elements of neobaroque and neoclassicism.
