= Gusevsky, Vladimir Oblast =

Urban locality in Vladimir Oblast, Russia

Coordinates: 55°39′35″N 40°33′43″E

Gusevsky (Russian: Гусевский) is an urban locality (urban-type settlement) under the administrative jurisdiction of the town of krai significance of Gus-Khrustalny of Vladimir Oblast, Russia. Population: 1,915 (2021 census); 3,134 (2010 census); 3,554 (2002 census); 4,493 (1989 Soviet census).
