= Gus-Khrustalny (town) =

Town in Vladimir Oblast, Russia

Gus-Khrustalny Гусь-Хрустальный
- Town
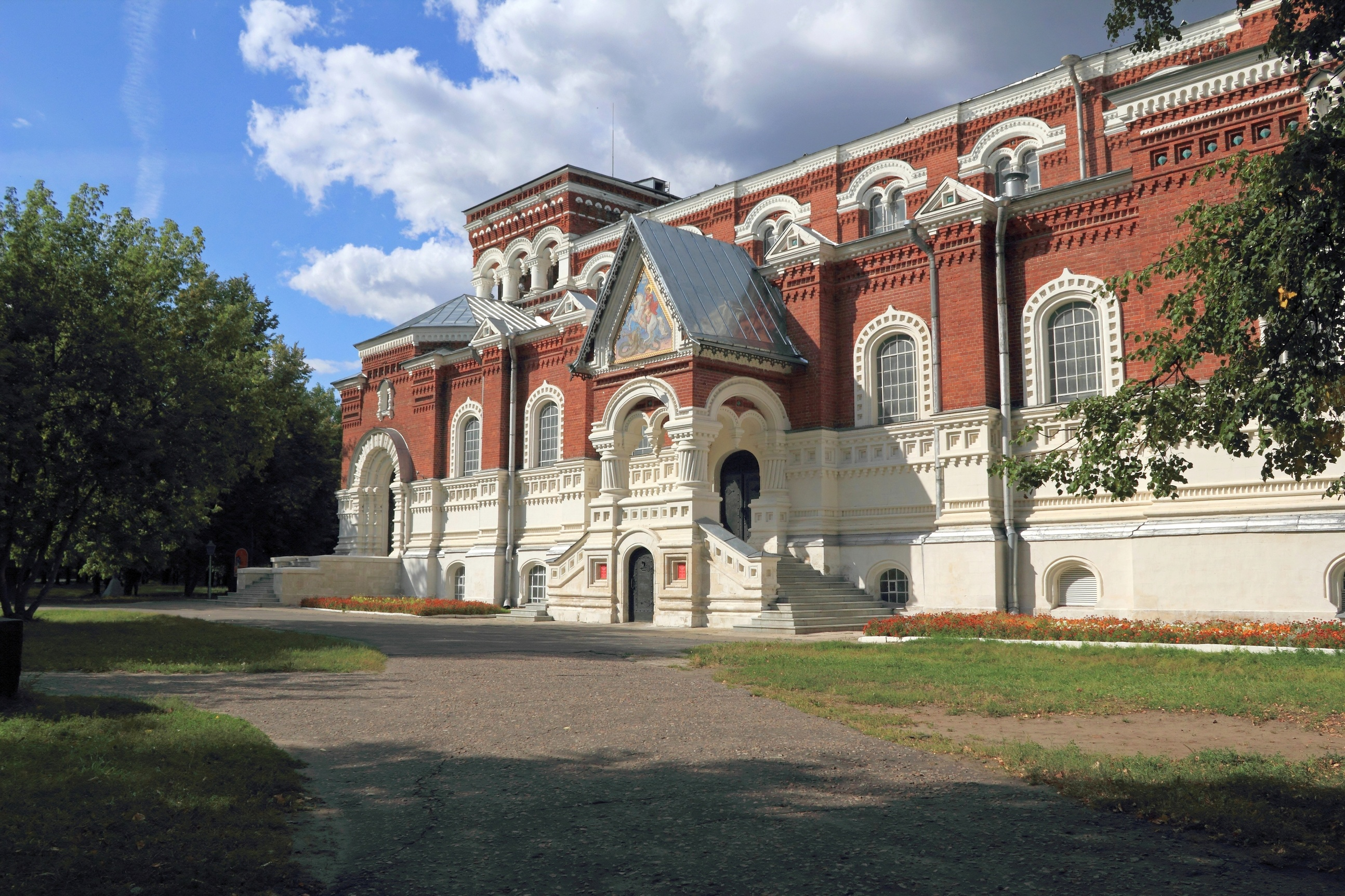
- Crystal museum (former Saint George Cathedral)

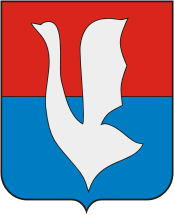
- Flag Coat of arms
- Interactive map of Gus-Khrustalny
- Location of Gus-Khrustalny Gus-Khrustalny (Vladimir Oblast)
- Coordinates: 55°37′N 40°41′E
- Country: Russia
- Federal subject: Vladimir Oblast
- Founded: 1756
- Town status since: 1931

Government
  - Head: Nikolay Balakhin
- Elevation: 130 m (430 ft)

Population (2010 Census)
  - Total: 60,784
  - Estimate (2025): 48,649 (−20%)
  - Rank: 267th in 2010

Administrative status
  - Subordinated to: Town of Gus-Khrustalny
  - Capital of: Gus-Khrustalny District, Town of Gus-Khrustalny

Municipal status
  - Urban okrug: Gus-Khrustalny Urban Okrug
  - Capital of: Gus-Khrustalny Urban Okrug, Gus-Khrustalny Municipal District
- Time zone: UTC+3 (MSK)
- Postal codes: 601500, 601501, 601503, 601505–601508
- Dialing code: +7 49241
- OKTMO ID: 17720000001
- Website: gusadmin.ru

Gus-Khrustalny (Russian: Гусь-Хруста́льный) is a town in Vladimir Oblast, Russia, located on the Gus River (a tributary of the Oka River) 63 kilometers (39 mi) south of Vladimir, the administrative center of the oblast. Population: 51,552 (2021 census); 60,784 (2010 census); 67,121 (2002 census); 76,360 (1989 Soviet census); 65,000 (1970); 40,000 (1939); 17,900 (1926).

== Etymology ==
The name of the town may be translated as "crystal goose", for it is known as one of the oldest centers of glass industry in Russia and stands on the Gus River. There are reasons to believe that its name is not derived from goose directly, but rather from the common Slavic term "goose" (in the respective languages) for a large (up to several gallons) bottle.

== History ==
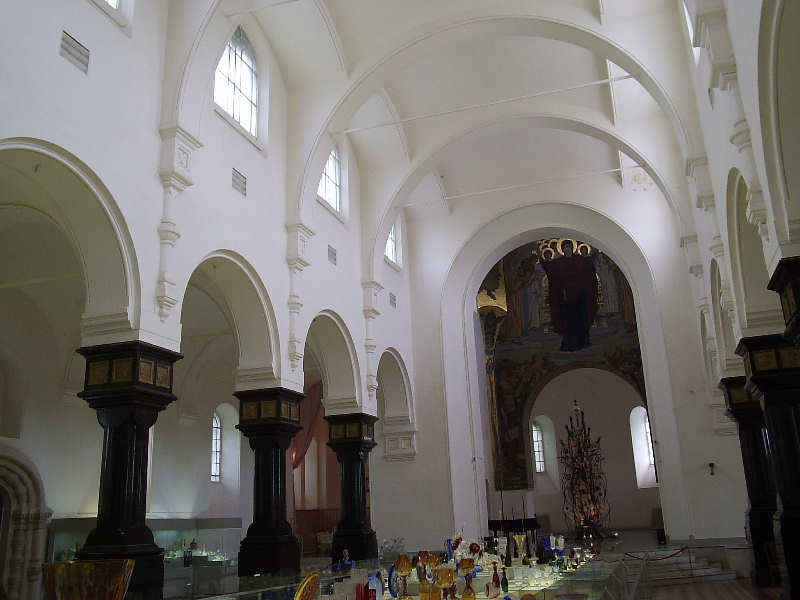
Crystal Museum in Gus-Khrustalny

Gus-Khrustalny was founded in 1756 with the construction of a crystal plant, Gus Crystal. It was granted town status in 1931.

Gus-Khrustalny is one of the towns of the Golden Ring.

== Administrative and municipal status ==
Within the framework of administrative divisions, Gus-Khrustalny serves as the administrative center of Gus-Khrustalny District, even though it is not a part of it. As an administrative division, it is, together with the urban-type settlement of Gusevsky and one rural locality (the settlement of Panfilovo), incorporated as the Town of Gus-Khrustalny—an administrative unit with the status equal to that of the districts. As a municipal division, the Town of Gus-Khrustalny is incorporated as Gus-Khrustalny Urban Okrug.

== Notable people ==
- Sergei Safronov, Soviet Air Defense Forces fighter pilot
- Rem Soloukhin, Soviet scientist specializing in physics and mechanics
