= Gus-Khrustalny District =

Gus-Khrustalny District Гусь-Хрустальный район (Russian)
- District
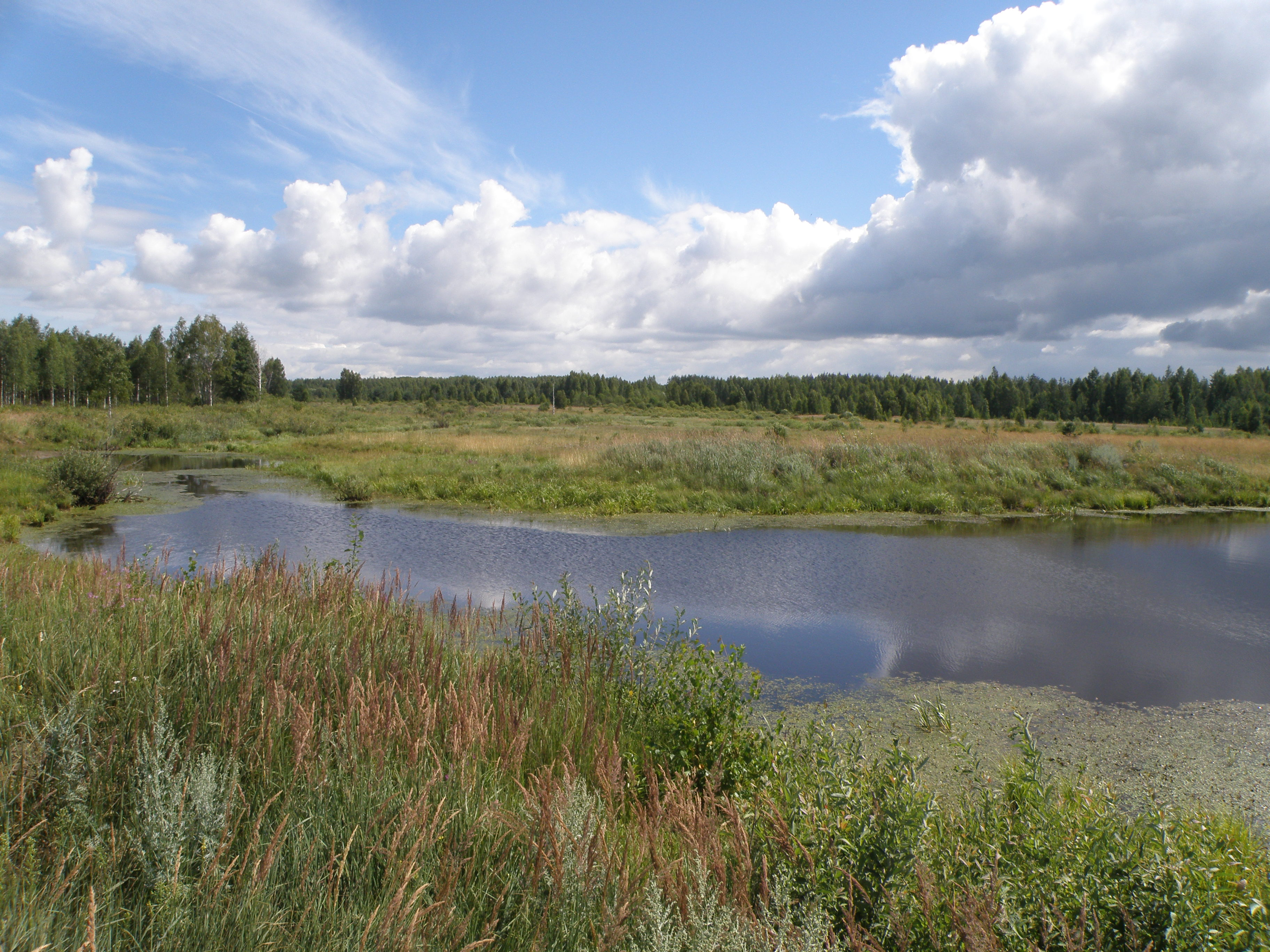
- Revukha valley near Palishchi

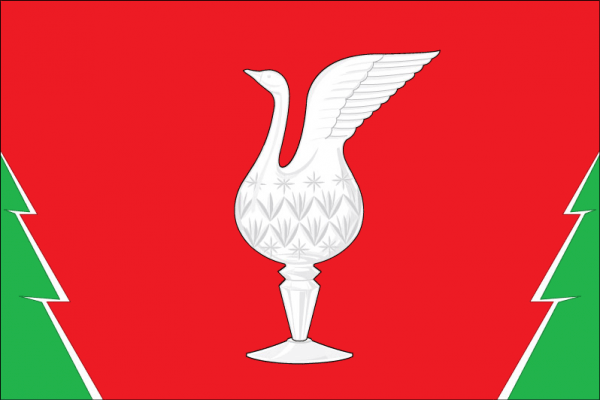
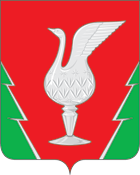
- Flag Coat of arms
- Location of Gus-Khrustalny District in Vladimir Oblast
- Coordinates: 55°37′N 40°40′E
- Country: Russia
- Federal subject: Vladimir Oblast
- Established: 1 October 1929
- Administrative center: Gus-Khrustalny

Area
  - Total: 4,370 km^{2} (1,690 sq mi)

Population (2010 Census)
  - Total: 44,883
  - Density: 10.3/km^{2} (26.6/sq mi)
  - Urban: 15.1%
  - Rural: 84.9%

Administrative structure
  - Inhabited localities: 1 cities/towns, 182 rural localities

Municipal structure
  - Municipally incorporated as: Gus-Khrustalny Municipal District
  - Municipal divisions: 1 urban settlements, 13 rural settlements
- Time zone: UTC+3 (MSK)
- OKTMO ID: 17620000
- Website: http://www.gusr.ru/

Gus-Khrustalny District (Russian: Гусь-Хруста́льный райо́н) is an administrative and municipal district (raion), one of the sixteen in Vladimir Oblast, Russia. It is located in the south of the oblast. The area of the district is 4,370 square kilometers (1,690 sq mi). Its administrative center is the town of Gus-Khrustalny (which is not administratively a part of the district). Population: 40,609 (2021 census); 44,883 (2010 census); 50,813 (2002 Census); 58,748 (1989 Soviet census).

== Administrative and municipal status ==
Within the framework of administrative divisions, Gus-Khrustalny District is one of the sixteen in the oblast. The town of Gus-Khrustalny serves as its administrative center, despite being incorporated separately as an administrative unit with the status equal to that of the districts.

As a municipal division, the district is incorporated as Gus-Khrustalny Municipal District. The Town of Gus-Khrustalny is incorporated separately from the district as Gus-Khrustalny Urban Okrug.

== Economy and transportation ==
The Gusevskoye peat narrow gauge railway for hauling peat operates in the district.
