= Sychevo =

Sychevo (Russian: Сычево) or Sychyovo (Russian: Сычёво) may refer to several localities in Russia:

== Sychevo ==
- Sychevo, Cherepovetsky District, Vologda Oblast
- Sychevo, Gryazovetsky District, Vologda Oblast
- Sychevo, Kharovsky District, Vologda Oblast
- Sychevo, Ustyuzhensky District, Vologda Oblast
- Sychevo, Vologodsky District, Vologda Oblast

== Sychyovo ==
- Sychyovo, Moscow Oblast
- Sychyovo, Vladimir Oblast
