= Pogorelka =

Pogorelka (Russian: Погорелка) is the name of several rural localities in Russia:

- Pogorelka, Vladimir Oblast, a village in Klyazminskoye Rural Settlement of Kovrovsky District, Vladimir Oblast
- Pogorelka, Vologodsky District, Vologda Oblast, a village in and the administrative center of Podlesnoye Rural Settlement in Vologodsky District, Vologda Oblast
- Pogorelka, Vozhegodsky District, Vologda Oblast, a village in Mishutinskoye Rural Settlement, Vozhegodsky District, Vologda Oblast
