= Ivakino =

Ivakino (Russian: Ивакино) is the name of several rural localities in Russia:

- Ivakino, Vladimir Oblast, a village in Malyginskoye Rural Settlement of Kovrovsky District, Vladimir Oblast
- Ivakino, Totemsky District, Vologda Oblast, a village in Pogorelovskoye Rural Settlement in Totemsky District, Vologda Oblast
- Ivakino, Vologodsky District, Vologda Oblast, a village in Staroselskoye Rural Settlement, Vologodsky District, Vologda Oblast
