= Igumnovo =

Igumnovo (Russian: Игумново) is the name of several rural localities in Russia:

- Igumnovo, Vladimir Oblast, a village in Klyazminskoye Rural Settlement of Kovrovsky District, Vladimir Oblast
- Igumnovo, Sheksninsky District, Vologda Oblast, a village in Churovskoye Rural Settlement in Sheksninsky District, Vologda Oblast
- Igumnovo, Ustyuzhensky District, Vologda Oblast, a village in Ustyuzhenskoye Rural Settlement, Ustyuzhensky District, Vologda Oblast
