= Bedrino =

Bedrino (Russian: Бедрино) is the name of the following rural localities in Russia:

- Bedrino, Vladimir Oblast, a village in Ivanovskoye Rural Settlement of Kovrovsky District, Vladimir Oblast
- Bedrino, Vologda Oblast, a village in Novlenskoye Rural Settlement of Vologodsky District, Vologda Oblast
