= Shmelyovo =

Shmelyovo Шмелёво
- Village
- Location within Vladimir Oblast Location within Russia
- Coordinates: 56°28′N 41°21′E
- Country: Russia
- Region: Vladimir Oblast
- District: Kovrovsky District
- Time zone: UTC+3:00

Shmelyovo (Russian: Шмелёво) is a rural locality (a village) in Malyginskoye Rural Settlement, Kovrovsky District, Vladimir Oblast, Russia. The population was 34 as of 2010.

== Geography ==
Shmelyovo is located 19 km north of Kovrov (the district's administrative centre) by road. Rogozinikha is the nearest rural locality.
