= Dostizheniye =

Dostizheniye Достижение
- Settlement
- Location within Vladimir Oblast Location within Russia
- Coordinates: 56°22′N 41°28′E
- Country: Russia
- Region: Vladimir Oblast
- District: Kovrovsky District
- Time zone: UTC+3:00

Dostizheniye (Russian: Достижение) is a rural locality (a settlement) in Klyazminskoye Rural Settlement, Kovrovsky District, Vladimir Oblast, Russia. The population was 893 as of 2010. There are 14 streets.

== Geography ==
Dostizheniye is located 14 km east of Kovrov (the district's administrative centre) by road. Gostyukhino is the nearest rural locality.
