= Krasny Oktyabr, Kovrovsky District, Vladimir Oblast =

Krasny Oktyabr Красный Октябрь
- Settlement
- Location within Vladimir Oblast Location within Russia
- Coordinates: 56°06′N 41°23′E
- Country: Russia
- Region: Vladimir Oblast
- District: Kovrovsky District
- Time zone: UTC+3:00

Krasny Oktyabr (Russian: Красный Октябрь) is a rural locality (a settlement) in Ivanovskoye Rural Settlement, Kovrovsky District, Vladimir Oblast, Russia. The population was 944 as of 2010. There are 8 streets.

== Geography ==
Krasny Oktyabr is located 35 km south from Kovrov (the district's administrative centre) by road. Bedrino is the nearest rural locality.
