= Obrashchikha =

Obrashchikha Обращиха
- Village
- Location within Vladimir Oblast Location within Russia
- Coordinates: 56°28′N 41°43′E
- Country: Russia
- Region: Vladimir Oblast
- District: Kovrovsky District
- Time zone: UTC+3:00

Obrashchikha (Russian: Обращиха) is a rural locality (a village) in Klyazminskoye Rural Settlement, Kovrovsky District, Vladimir Oblast, Russia. The population was 4 as of 2010.

== Geography ==
Obrashchikha is located 33 km northeast of Kovrov (the district's administrative centre) by road. Krasnaya Griva is the nearest rural locality.
