= Khoryatino =

Khoryatino Хорятино
- Village
- Location within Vladimir Oblast Location within Russia
- Coordinates: 56°25′N 41°33′E
- Country: Russia
- Region: Vladimir Oblast
- District: Kovrovsky District
- Time zone: UTC+3:00

Khoryatino (Russian: Хорятино) is a rural locality (a village) in Klyazminskoye Rural Settlement, Kovrovsky District, Vladimir Oblast, Russia. The population was 10 as of 2010.

== Geography ==
Khoryatino is located 21 km east of Kovrov (the district's administrative centre) by road. Chentsy is the nearest rural locality.
