= Verkhutikha =

Verkhutikha Верхутиха
- Village
- Location within Vladimir Oblast Location within Russia
- Coordinates: 56°24′N 41°14′E
- Country: Russia
- Region: Vladimir Oblast
- District: Kovrovsky District
- Time zone: UTC+3:00

Verkhutikha (Russian: Верхутиха) is a rural locality (a village) in Malyginskoye Rural Settlement, Kovrovsky District, Vladimir Oblast, Russia. The population was 78 as of 2010.

== Geography ==
Verkhutikha is located 9 km northwest of Kovrov (the district's administrative centre) by road. Kuznechikha is the nearest rural locality.
