= Krutovo, Kovrovsky District, Vladimir Oblast =

Krutovo Крутово
- Selo
- Location within Vladimir Oblast Location within Russia
- Coordinates: 56°11′N 41°20′E
- Country: Russia
- Region: Vladimir Oblast
- District: Kovrovsky District
- Time zone: UTC+3:00

Krutovo (Russian: Крутово) is a rural locality (a selo) in Novoselskoye Rural Settlement, Kovrovsky District, Vladimir Oblast, Russia. The population was 498 as of 2010. There are 6 streets.

== Geography ==
Krutovo is located on the Nerekhta River, 22 km south of Kovrov (the district's administrative centre) by road. Maryino is the nearest rural locality.
