= Sazhino, Vladimir Oblast =

Sazhino Сажино
- Village
- Location within Vladimir Oblast Location within Russia
- Coordinates: 56°13′N 41°06′E
- Country: Russia
- Region: Vladimir Oblast
- District: Kovrovsky District
- Time zone: UTC+3:00

Sazhino (Russian: Сажино) is a rural locality (a village) in Novoselskoye Rural Settlement, Kovrovsky District, Vladimir Oblast, Russia. The population was 8 as of 2010.

== Geography ==
Sazhino is located 60 km southwest of Kovrov (the district's administrative centre) by road. Rusino is the nearest rural locality.
