= Tsepelyovo =

Tsepelyovo Цепелёво
- Village
- Location within Vladimir Oblast Location within Russia
- Coordinates: 56°24′N 41°26′E
- Country: Russia
- Region: Vladimir Oblast
- District: Kovrovsky District
- Time zone: UTC+3:00

Tsepelyovo (Russian: Цепелёво) is a rural locality (a village) in Klyazminskoye Rural Settlement, Kovrovsky District, Vladimir Oblast, Russia. The population was 20 as of 2010.

== Geography ==
Tsepelyovo is located 15 km east of Kovrov (the district's administrative centre) by road. Skomorokhovo is the nearest rural locality.
