= Shevinskaya =

Shevinskaya Шевинская
- Village
- Location within Vladimir Oblast Location within Russia
- Coordinates: 56°01′N 41°38′E
- Country: Russia
- Region: Vladimir Oblast
- District: Kovrovsky District
- Time zone: UTC+3:00

Shevinskaya (Russian: Шевинская) is a rural locality (a village) in Ivanovskoye Rural Settlement, Kovrovsky District, Vladimir Oblast, Russia. The population was 285 as of 2010. There are 3 streets.

== Geography ==
Shevinskaya is located 53 km southeast of Kovrov (the district's administrative centre) by road. Novoberezovo is the nearest rural locality.
