= Aksenikha =

Aksenikha Аксениха
- Village
- Location within Vladimir Oblast Location within Russia
- Coordinates: 56°04′N 41°34′E
- Country: Russia
- Region: Vladimir Oblast
- District: Kovrovsky District
- Time zone: UTC+3:00

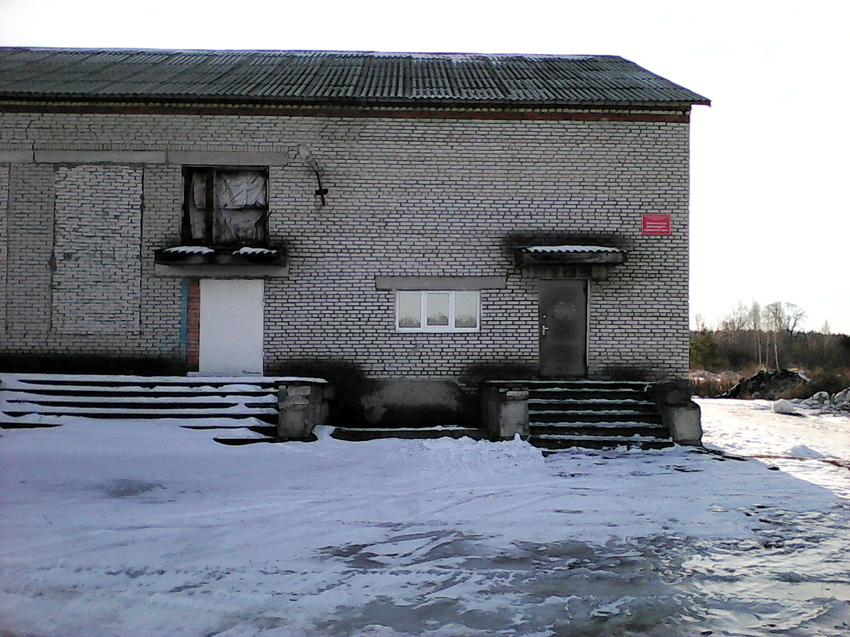

Aksenikha (Russian: Аксениха) is a rural locality (a village) in Ivanovskoye Rural Settlement, Kovrovsky District, Vladimir Oblast, Russia. The population was 98 as of 2010. There are 3 streets.

== Geography ==
Aksenikha is located on the left bank of the Kestromka River, 46 km south of Kovrov (the district's administrative centre) by road. Otrub is the nearest rural locality.
