= Krestnikovo (settlement), Vladimir Oblast =

Krestnikovo Крестниково
- Settlement
- Location within Vladimir Oblast Location within Russia
- Coordinates: 56°19′N 41°37′E
- Country: Russia
- Region: Vladimir Oblast
- District: Kovrovsky District
- Time zone: UTC+3:00

Krestnikovo (Russian: Крестниково) is a rural locality (a settlement) in Klyazminskoye Rural Settlement, Kovrovsky District, Vladimir Oblast, Russia. The population was 272 as of 2010. There are 13 streets.

== Geography ==
Krestnikovo is located 25 km southeast of Kovrov (the district's administrative centre) by road. Cheremkha is the nearest rural locality.
