= Yelnikovo =

Yelnikovo Ельниково
- Village
- Location within Vladimir Oblast Location within Russia
- Coordinates: 56°16′N 41°12′E
- Country: Russia
- Region: Vladimir Oblast
- District: Kovrovsky District
- Time zone: UTC+3:00

Yelnikovo (Russian: Ельниково) is a rural locality (a village) in Novoselskoye Rural Settlement, Kovrovsky District, Vladimir Oblast, Russia. The population was 2 as of 2010.

== Geography ==
Yelnikovo is located 16 km southwest of Kovrov (the district's administrative centre) by road. Belkovo is the nearest rural locality.
