= Milinovo =

Milinovo Милиново
- Selo
- Location within Vladimir Oblast Location within Russia
- Coordinates: 56°03′N 41°14′E
- Country: Russia
- Region: Vladimir Oblast
- District: Kovrovsky District
- Time zone: UTC+3:00

Milinovo (Russian: Милиново) is a rural locality (a selo) in Novoselskoye Rural Settlement, Kovrovsky District, Vladimir Oblast, Russia. The population was 21 as of 2010. There are 2 streets.

== Geography ==
Milinovo is located 53 km south of Kovrov (the district's administrative centre) by road. Vasilyevo is the nearest rural locality.
