= Belkovo, Kovrovsky District, Vladimir Oblast =

Belkovo Бельково
- Village
- Location within Vladimir Oblast Location within Russia
- Coordinates: 56°17′N 41°12′E
- Country: Russia
- Region: Vladimir Oblast
- District: Kovrovsky District
- Time zone: UTC+3:00

Belkovo (Russian: Бельково) is a rural locality (a village) in Novoselskoye Rural Settlement, Kovrovsky District, Vladimir Oblast, Russia. The population was 137 as of 2010.

== Geography ==
Belkovo is located 13 km southwest of Kovrov (the district's administrative centre) by road. Sychevo is the nearest rural locality.
