= Berchakovo =

Berchakovo Берчаково
- Village
- Location within Vladimir Oblast Location within Russia
- Coordinates: 56°27′N 41°35′E
- Country: Russia
- Region: Vladimir Oblast
- District: Kovrovsky District
- Time zone: UTC+3:00

Berchakovo (Russian: Берчаково) is a rural locality (a village) in Klyazminskoye Rural Settlement, Kovrovsky District, Vladimir Oblast, Russia.

== Geography ==
Berchakovo is located 23 km northeast of Kovrov (the district's administrative centre) by road. Repniki is the nearest rural locality.
