= Doronikha =

Doronikha Дорониха
- Village
- Location within Vladimir Oblast Location within Russia
- Coordinates: 56°29′N 41°47′E
- Country: Russia
- Region: Vladimir Oblast
- District: Kovrovsky District
- Time zone: UTC+3:00

Doronikha (Russian: Дорониха) is a rural locality (a village) in Klyazminskoye Rural Settlement, Kovrovsky District, Vladimir Oblast, Russia. The population was 35 as of 2010. There are 2 streets.

== Geography ==
Doronikha is located on the Klyazma River, 37 km northeast of Kovrov (the district's administrative centre) by road. Yurino is the nearest rural locality.
