= Ashcherino =

Ashcherino Ащерино
- Village
- Location within Vladimir Oblast Location within Russia
- Coordinates: 56°23′59″N 41°25′45″E
- Country: Russia
- Region: Vladimir Oblast
- District: Kovrovsky District
- Time zone: UTC+3:00

Ashcherino (Russian: Ащерино) is a rural locality (a village) in Klyazminskoye Rural Settlement, Kovrovsky District, Vladimir Oblast, Russia. The population was 17 as of 2010. There are 3 streets.

== Geography ==
Ashcherino is located 11 km east of Kovrov (the district's administrative centre) by road. Tsepelevo is the nearest rural locality.
