= Khvatachevo =

Khvatachevo Хватачево
- Village
- Location within Vladimir Oblast Location within Russia
- Coordinates: 56°28′N 41°12′E
- Country: Russia
- Region: Vladimir Oblast
- District: Kovrovsky District
- Time zone: UTC+3:00

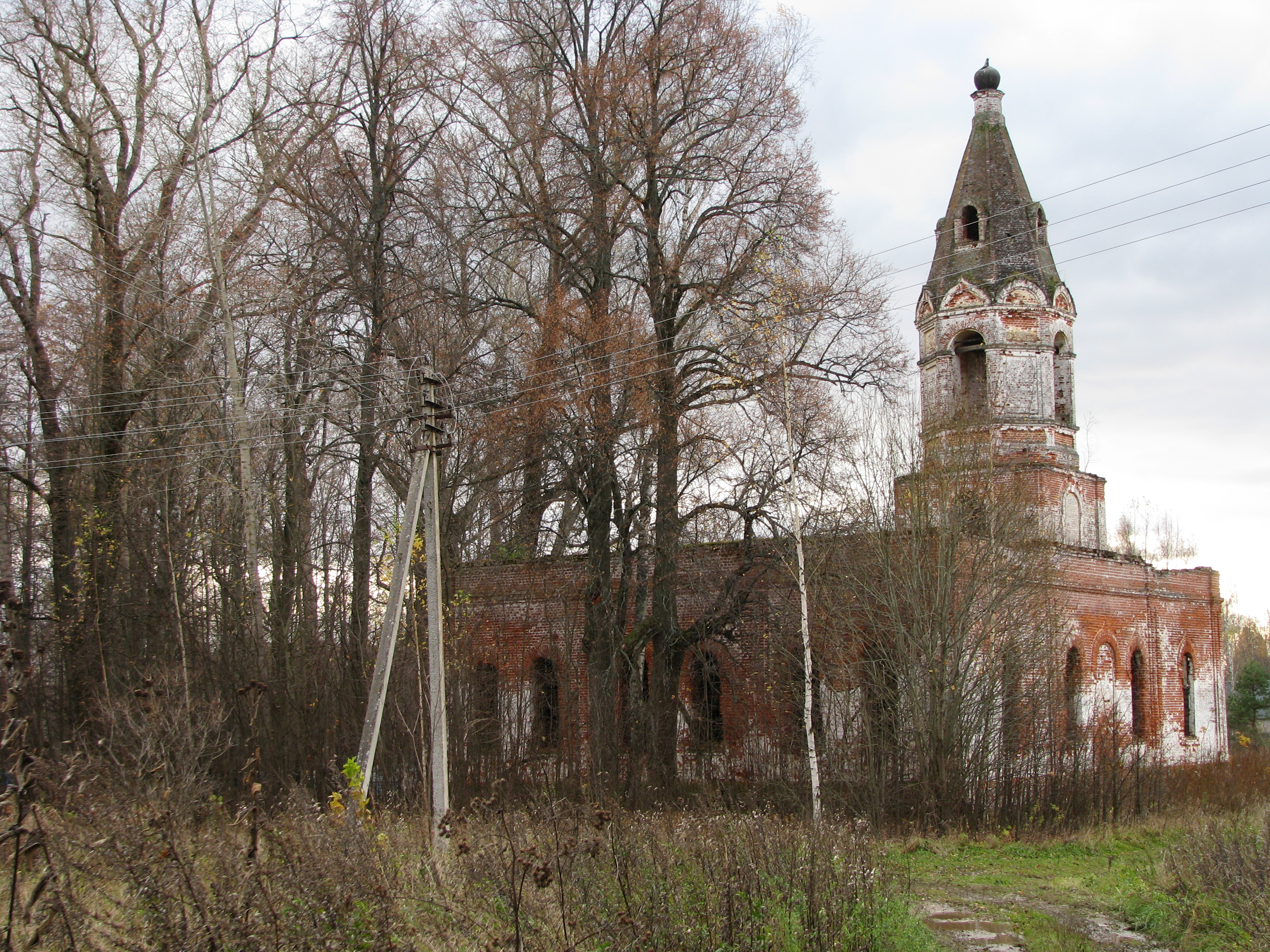

Khvatachevo (Russian: Хватачево) is a rural locality (a village) in Malyginskoye Rural Settlement, Kovrovsky District, Vladimir Oblast, Russia. The population was 6 as of 2010.

== Geography ==
Khvatachevo is located 19 km northwest of Kovrov (the district's administrative centre) by road. Klimovo is the nearest rural locality.
