= Bliznino, Kovrovsky District, Vladimir Oblast =

Bliznino Близнино
- Village
- Location within Vladimir Oblast Location within Russia
- Coordinates: 56°27′N 41°32′E
- Country: Russia
- Region: Vladimir Oblast
- District: Kovrovsky District
- Time zone: UTC+3:00

Bliznino (Russian: Близнино) is a rural locality (a village) in Klyazminskoye Rural Settlement, Kovrovsky District, Vladimir Oblast, Russia. The population was 18 as of 2010.

== Geography ==
Bliznino is located 20 km northeast of Kovrov (the district's administrative centre) by road. Baberikha is the nearest rural locality.
