= Kochetikha =

Kochetikha Кочетиха
- Village
- Location within Vladimir Oblast Location within Russia
- Coordinates: 56°25′N 41°51′E
- Country: Russia
- Region: Vladimir Oblast
- District: Kovrovsky District
- Time zone: UTC+3:00

Kochetikha (Russian: Кочетиха) is a rural locality (a village) in Klyazminskoye Rural Settlement, Kovrovsky District, Vladimir Oblast, Russia. The population was 1 as of 2010.

== Geography ==
Kochetikha is located 44 km east of Kovrov (the district's administrative centre) by road. Seltso is the nearest rural locality.
