= Fedyunino =

Fedyunino Федюнино
- Village
- Location within Vladimir Oblast Location within Russia
- Coordinates: 56°27′N 41°41′E
- Country: Russia
- Region: Vladimir Oblast
- District: Kovrovsky District
- Time zone: UTC+3:00

Fedyunino (Russian: Федюнино) is a rural locality (a village) in Klyazminskoye Rural Settlement, Kovrovsky District, Vladimir Oblast, Russia. The population was 1 as of 2010.

== Geography ==
Fedyunino is located 29 km northeast of Kovrov (the district's administrative centre) by road. Krasnaya Griva is the nearest rural locality.
