= Govyadikha =

Govyadikha Говядиха
- Village
- Location within Vladimir Oblast Location within Russia
- Coordinates: 56°20′N 41°23′E
- Country: Russia
- Region: Vladimir Oblast
- District: Kovrovsky District
- Time zone: UTC+3:00

Govyadikha (Russian: Говядиха) is a rural locality (a village) in Klyazminskoye Rural Settlement, Kovrovsky District, Vladimir Oblast, Russia. The population was 10 as of 2010. There are 3 streets.

== Geography ==
Govyadikha is located 9 km southeast of Kovrov (the district's administrative centre) by road. Gridino is the nearest rural locality.
