= Serkovo, Kovrovsky District, Vladimir Oblast =

Serkovo Серково
- Village
- Location within Vladimir Oblast Location within Russia
- Coordinates: 56°11′N 41°38′E
- Country: Russia
- Region: Vladimir Oblast
- District: Kovrovsky District
- Time zone: UTC+3:00

Serkovo (Russian: Серково) is a rural locality (a village) in Ivanovskoye Rural Settlement, Kovrovsky District, Vladimir Oblast, Russia. The population was 1 as of 2010.

== Geography ==
Serkovo is located 42 km southeast of Kovrov (the district's administrative centre) by road. Plokhovo is the nearest rural locality.
