= Pogost, Kovrovsky District, Vladimir Oblast =

Pogost Погост
- Village
- Location within Vladimir Oblast Location within Russia
- Coordinates: 56°20′N 41°14′E
- Country: Russia
- Region: Vladimir Oblast
- District: Kovrovsky District
- Time zone: UTC+3:00

Pogost (Russian: Погост) is a rural locality (a village) in Novoselskoye Rural Settlement, Kovrovsky District, Vladimir Oblast, Russia. The population was 141 as of 2010.

== Geography ==
Pogost is located on the Nerekhta River, 7 km west of Kovrov (the district's administrative centre) by road. Kovrov is the nearest rural locality.
