= Smolino, Kovrovsky District, Vladimir Oblast =

Smolino Смолино
- Selo
- Location within Vladimir Oblast Location within Russia
- Coordinates: 56°04′N 41°24′E
- Country: Russia
- Region: Vladimir Oblast
- District: Kovrovsky District
- Time zone: UTC+3:00

Smolino (Russian: Смолино) is a rural locality (a selo) in Ivanovskoye Rural Settlement, Kovrovsky District, Vladimir Oblast, Russia. The population was 377 as of 2010. There are 5 streets.

== Geography ==
Smolino is located 40 km south of Kovrov (the district's administrative centre) by road. Krasny Oktyabr is the nearest rural locality.
