= Esino, Vladimir Oblast =

Esino Эсино
- Village
- Location within Vladimir Oblast Location within Russia
- Coordinates: 56°08′N 41°30′E
- Country: Russia
- Region: Vladimir Oblast
- District: Kovrovsky District
- Time zone: UTC+3:00

Esino (Russian: Эсино) is a rural locality (a village) in Ivanovskoye Rural Settlement, Kovrovsky District, Vladimir Oblast, Russia. The population was 15 as of 2010.

== Geography ==
Esino is located 37 km south of Kovrov (the district's administrative centre) by road. Ivanovo is the nearest rural locality.
