= Panyukino =

Panyukino Панюкино
- Village
- Location within Vladimir Oblast Location within Russia
- Coordinates: 56°27′N 41°22′E
- Country: Russia
- Region: Vladimir Oblast
- District: Kovrovsky District
- Time zone: UTC+3:00

Panyukino (Russian: Панюкино) is a rural locality (a village) in Malyginskoye Rural Settlement, Kovrovsky District, Vladimir Oblast, Russia. The population was 7 as of 2010.

== Geography ==
Panyukino is located 19 km north of Kovrov (the district's administrative centre) by road. Polevaya is the nearest rural locality.
