= Kuznechikha =

Kuznechikha Кузнечиха
- Village
- Location within Vladimir Oblast Location within Russia
- Coordinates: 56°24′N 41°15′E
- Country: Russia
- Region: Vladimir Oblast
- District: Kovrovsky District
- Time zone: UTC+3:00

Kuznechikha (Russian: Кузнечиха) is a rural locality (a village) in Malyginskoye Rural Settlement, Kovrovsky District, Vladimir Oblast, Russia. The population was 81 as of 2010.

== Geography ==
Kuznechikha is located 8 km northwest of Kovrov (the district's administrative centre) by road. Verkhutikha is the nearest rural locality.
