= Malygino =

Malygino Малыгино
- Settlement
- Location within Vladimir Oblast Location within Russia
- Coordinates: 56°24′N 41°09′E
- Country: Russia
- Region: Vladimir Oblast
- District: Kovrovsky District
- Time zone: UTC+3:00

Malygino (Russian: Малыгино) is a rural locality (a settlement) in Malyginskoye Rural Settlement, Kovrovsky District, Vladimir Oblast, Russia. The population was 2,084 as of 2010. Malygino has 7 streets.

== Geography ==
Malygino is located 13 km northwest of Kovrov (the district's administrative centre) by road. Kislyakovo is the nearest rural locality.
