= Kryachkovo =

Kryachkovo Крячково
- Village
- Location within Vladimir Oblast Location within Russia
- Coordinates: 56°26′N 41°16′E
- Country: Russia
- Region: Vladimir Oblast
- District: Kovrovsky District
- Time zone: UTC+3:00

Kryachkovo (Russian: Крячково) is a rural locality (a village) in Malyginskoye Rural Settlement, Kovrovsky District, Vladimir Oblast, Russia. The population was 34 as of 2010.

== Geography ==
Kryachkovo is located 13 km north of Kovrov (the district's administrative centre) by road. Gigant is the nearest rural locality.
