= Gridino, Kovrovsky District, Vladimir Oblast =

Gridino Гридино
- Village
- Location within Vladimir Oblast Location within Russia
- Coordinates: 56°19′N 41°21′E
- Country: Russia
- Region: Vladimir Oblast
- District: Kovrovsky District
- Time zone: UTC+3:00

Gridino (Russian: Гридино) is a rural locality (a village) in Klyazminskoye Rural Settlement, Kovrovsky District, Vladimir Oblast, Russia. The population was 133 as of 2010.

== Geography ==
Gridino is located 7 km southeast of Kovrov (the district's administrative centre) by road. Govyadikha is the nearest rural locality.
