= Makarovo, Kovrovsky District, Vladimir Oblast =

Makarovo Макарово
- Village
- Location within Vladimir Oblast Location within Russia
- Coordinates: 56°07′N 41°19′E
- Country: Russia
- Region: Vladimir Oblast
- District: Kovrovsky District
- Time zone: UTC+3:00

Makarovo (Russian: Макарово) is a rural locality (a village) in Ivanovskoye Rural Settlement, Kovrovsky District, Vladimir Oblast, Russia. The population was 15 as of 2010.

== Geography ==
Makarovo is located 30 km south of Kovrov (the district's administrative centre) by road. Bedrino is the nearest rural locality.
