= Chernositovo =

Chernositovo Черноситово
- Village
- Location within Vladimir Oblast Location within Russia
- Coordinates: 56°16′N 41°15′E
- Country: Russia
- Region: Vladimir Oblast
- District: Kovrovsky District
- Time zone: UTC+3:00

Chernositovo (Russian: Черноситово) is a rural locality (a village) in Novoselskoye Rural Settlement, Kovrovsky District, Vladimir Oblast, Russia. The population was 4 as of 2010.

== Geography ==
Chernositovo is located 13 km southwest of Kovrov (the district's administrative centre) by road. Melekhovo is the nearest rural locality.
