= Krestnikovo =

Krestnikovo Крестниково
- Hamlet
- Location within Vladimir Oblast Location within Russia
- Coordinates: 56°20′N 41°36′E
- Country: Russia
- Region: Vladimir Oblast
- District: Kovrovsky District
- Time zone: UTC+3:00

Krestnikovo (Russian: Крестниково) is a rural locality (a hamlet) in Klyazminskoye Rural Settlement, Kovrovsky District, Vladimir Oblast, Russia. The population was 14 as of 2010.

== Geography ==
Krestnikovo is located 22 km southeast of Kovrov (the district's administrative centre) by road. Moshachikha is the nearest rural locality.
