= Ruchey, Vladimir Oblast =

Ruchey Ручей
- Village
- Location within Vladimir Oblast Location within Russia
- Coordinates: 56°23′N 41°15′E
- Country: Russia
- Region: Vladimir Oblast
- District: Kovrovsky District
- Time zone: UTC+3:00

Ruchey (Russian: Ручей) is a rural locality (a village) and the administrative center of Malyginskoye Rural Settlement, Kovrovsky District, Vladimir Oblast, Russia. The population was 1,046 as of 2010. There are 8 streets.

== Geography ==
Ruchey is located 6 km northwest of Kovrov (the district's administrative centre) by road. Kuznechikha is the nearest rural locality.
