= Sergeytsevo =

Sergeytsevo Сергейцево
- Village
- Location within Vladimir Oblast Location within Russia
- Coordinates: 56°22′N 41°10′E
- Country: Russia
- Region: Vladimir Oblast
- District: Kovrovsky District
- Time zone: UTC+3:00

Sergeytsevo (Russian: Сергейцево) is a rural locality (a village) in Malyginskoye Rural Settlement, Kovrovsky District, Vladimir Oblast, Russia. The population was 140 as of 2010.

== Geography ==
Sergeytsevo is located 12 km west of Kovrov (the district's administrative centre) by road. Pakino is the nearest rural locality.
