= Alachino =

Alachino Алачино
- Selo
- Location within Vladimir Oblast Location within Russia
- Coordinates: 56°13′N 41°09′E
- Country: Russia
- Region: Vladimir Oblast
- District: Kovrovsky District

Alachino (Russian: Алачино) is a rural locality (a selo) in Novoselskoye Rural Settlement, Kovrovsky District, Vladimir Oblast, Russia. The population was 7 as of 2010.

== Geography ==
Alachino is located 60 kilometres (37 mi) southwest of Kovrov (the district's administrative centre) by road. Dmitriyevo is the nearest rural locality.
