= Kusakino =

Kusakino Кусакино
- Village
- Location within Vladimir Oblast Location within Russia
- Coordinates: 56°27′N 41°11′E
- Country: Russia
- Region: Vladimir Oblast
- District: Kovrovsky District
- Time zone: UTC+3:00

Kusakino (Russian: Кусакино) is a rural locality (a village) in Malyginskoye Rural Settlement, Kovrovsky District, Vladimir Oblast, Russia. The population was 1 as of 2010.

== Geography ==
Kusakino is located 18 km northwest of Kovrov (the district's administrative centre) by road. Shusherino is the nearest rural locality.
