= Ilyino, Kovrovsky District, Vladimir Oblast =

Ilyino Ильино
- Village
- Location within Vladimir Oblast Location within Russia
- Coordinates: 56°28′N 41°27′E
- Country: Russia
- Region: Vladimir Oblast
- District: Kovrovsky District
- Time zone: UTC+3:00

Ilyino (Russian: Ильино) is a rural locality (a village) in Malyginskoye Rural Settlement, Kovrovsky District, Vladimir Oblast, Russia. The population was 252 as of 2010. There are 2 streets.

== Geography ==
Ilyino is located 26 km northeast of Kovrov (the district's administrative centre) by road. Artemovo is the nearest rural locality.
