= Ploskovo, Kovrovsky District, Vladimir Oblast =

Ploskovo Плосково
- Village
- Location within Vladimir Oblast Location within Russia
- Coordinates: 56°22′N 41°23′E
- Country: Russia
- Region: Vladimir Oblast
- District: Kovrovsky District
- Time zone: UTC+3:00

Ploskovo (Russian: Плосково) is a rural locality (a village) in Klyazminskoye Rural Settlement, Kovrovsky District, Vladimir Oblast, Russia. The population was 6 as of 2010.

== Geography ==
Ploskovo is located 6 km east of Kovrov (the district's administrative centre) by road. Pogorelka is the nearest rural locality.
