= Knyazhskaya =

Knyazhskaya Княжская
- Village
- Location within Vladimir Oblast Location within Russia
- Coordinates: 56°27′N 41°37′E
- Country: Russia
- Region: Vladimir Oblast
- District: Kovrovsky District
- Time zone: UTC+3:00

Knyazhskaya (Russian: Княжская) is a rural locality (a village) in Klyazminskoye Rural Settlement, Kovrovsky District, Vladimir Oblast, Russia. The population was 19 as of 2010.

== Geography ==
Knyazhskaya is located 25 km northeast of Kovrov (the district's administrative centre) by road. Guzhikha is the nearest rural locality.
