= Shusherino =

Shusherino Шушерино
- Village
- Location within Vladimir Oblast Location within Russia
- Coordinates: 56°27′N 41°12′E
- Country: Russia
- Region: Vladimir Oblast
- District: Kovrovsky District
- Time zone: UTC+3:00

Shusherino (Russian: Шушерино) is a rural locality (a village) in Malyginskoye Rural Settlement, Kovrovsky District, Vladimir Oblast, Russia. The population was 8 as of 2010.

== Geography ==
Shusherino is located 17 km northwest of Kovrov (the district's administrative centre) by road. Kusakino is the nearest rural locality.
