= Moshachikha =

Moshachikha Мошачиха
- Village
- Location within Vladimir Oblast Location within Russia
- Coordinates: 56°20′N 41°34′E
- Country: Russia
- Region: Vladimir Oblast
- District: Kovrovsky District
- Time zone: UTC+3:00

Moshachikha (Russian: Мошачиха) is a rural locality (a village) in Klyazminskoye Rural Settlement, Kovrovsky District, Vladimir Oblast, Russia. The population was 3 as of 2010.

== Geography ==
Moshachikha is located 20 km east of Kovrov (the district's administrative centre) by road. Krestnikovo is the nearest rural locality.
