= Kariki =

Kariki Карики
- Village
- Location within Vladimir Oblast Location within Russia
- Coordinates: 56°25′N 41°39′E
- Country: Russia
- Region: Vladimir Oblast
- District: Kovrovsky District
- Time zone: UTC+3:00

Kariki (Russian: Карики) is a rural locality (a village) in Klyazminskoye Rural Settlement, Kovrovsky District, Vladimir Oblast, Russia. The population was 48 as of 2010.

== Geography ==
Kariki is located 30 km northeast of Kovrov (the district's administrative centre) by road. Sannikovo is the nearest rural locality.
