= Gorozhyonovo =

Gorozhyonovo Горожёново
- Village
- Location within Vladimir Oblast Location within Russia
- Coordinates: 56°13′N 41°17′E
- Country: Russia
- Region: Vladimir Oblast
- District: Kovrovsky District
- Time zone: UTC+3:00

Gorozhyonovo (Russian: Горожёново) is a rural locality (a village) in Novoselskoye Rural Settlement, Kovrovsky District, Vladimir Oblast, Russia. The population was 14 as of 2010. There is 1 street.

== Geography ==
Gorozhyonovo is located 18 km south of Kovrov (the district's administrative centre) by road. Dobrograd is the nearest rural locality.
