= Gostyukhino =

Gostyukhino Гостюхино
- Village
- Location within Vladimir Oblast Location within Russia
- Coordinates: 56°23′N 41°27′E
- Country: Russia
- Region: Vladimir Oblast
- District: Kovrovsky District
- Time zone: UTC+3:00

Gostyukhino (Russian: Гостюхино) is a rural locality (a village) in Klyazminskoye Rural Settlement, Kovrovsky District, Vladimir Oblast, Russia. The population was 88 as of 2010. There is 1 street.

== Geography ==
Gostyukhino is located 14 km east of Kovrov (the district's administrative centre) by road. Dostizheniye is the nearest rural locality.
