= Marinino =

Marinino Маринино
- Selo
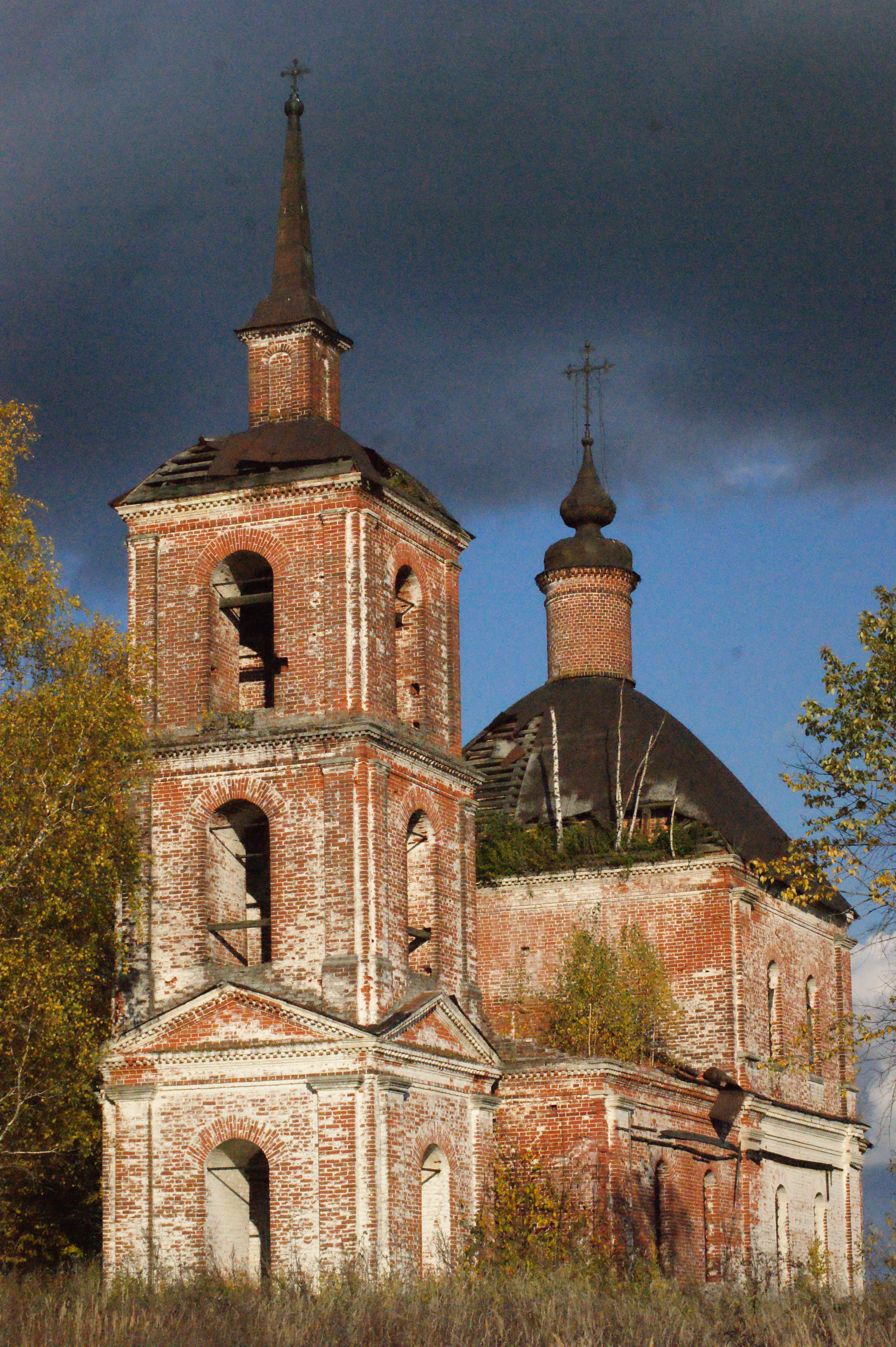
- Church of the Intercession of the Virgin Mary in Marinino, Kovrovsky District.

- Location within Vladimir Oblast Location within Russia
- Coordinates: 56°07′N 41°15′E
- Country: Russia
- Region: Vladimir Oblast
- District: Kovrovsky District
- Time zone: UTC+3:00

Marinino (Russian: Маринино) is a rural locality (a selo) in Novoselskoye Rural Settlement, Kovrovsky District, Vladimir Oblast, Russia. The population was 60 as of 2010.

== Geography ==
Marinino is located 31 km south of Kovrov (the district's administrative centre) by road. Demino is the nearest rural locality.
