= Troitsko-Nikolskoye =

Troitsko-Nikolskoye Троицко-Никольское
- Selo
- Location within Vladimir Oblast Location within Russia
- Coordinates: 56°18′N 41°18′E
- Country: Russia
- Region: Vladimir Oblast
- District: Kovrovsky District
- Time zone: UTC+3:00

Troitsko-Nikolskoye (Russian: Троицко-Никольское) is a rural locality (a selo) in Novoselskoye Rural Settlement, Kovrovsky District, Vladimir Oblast, Russia. The population was 34 as of 2010.

== Geography ==
Troitsko-Nikolskoye is located 8 km south of Kovrov (the district's administrative centre) by road. Kovrov is the nearest rural locality.
