= Malye Vsegodichi =

Malye Vsegodichi Малые Всегодичи
- Selo
- Location within Vladimir Oblast Location within Russia
- Coordinates: 56°26′N 41°21′E
- Country: Russia
- Region: Vladimir Oblast
- District: Kovrovsky District
- Time zone: UTC+3:00

Malye Vsegodichi (Russian: Малые Всегодичи) is a rural locality (a selo) in Malyginskoye Rural Settlement, Kovrovsky District, Vladimir Oblast, Russia. The population was 25 as of 2010.

== Geography ==
Malye Vsegodichi is located on the Uvod River, 17 km north of Kovrov (the district's administrative centre) by road. Bolshiye Vsegodichi is the nearest rural locality.
