= Yudikha, Vladimir Oblast =

Yudikha Юдиха
- Village
- Location within Vladimir Oblast Location within Russia
- Coordinates: 56°29′N 41°46′E
- Country: Russia
- Region: Vladimir Oblast
- District: Kovrovsky District
- Time zone: UTC+3:00

Yudikha (Russian: Юдиха) is a rural locality (a village) in Klyazminskoye Rural Settlement, Kovrovsky District, Vladimir Oblast, Russia. The population was 67 as of 2010.

== Geography ==
Yudikha is located on the Klyazma River, 36 km northeast of Kovrov (the district's administrative centre) by road. Doronikha is the nearest rural locality.
