= Babyonki =

Babyonki Бабёнки
- Village
- Location within Vladimir Oblast Location within Russia
- Coordinates: 56°18′N 41°15′E
- Country: Russia
- Region: Vladimir Oblast
- District: Kovrovsky District
- Time zone: UTC+3:00

Babyonki (Russian: Бабёнки) is a rural locality (a village) in Novoselskoye Rural Settlement, Kovrovsky District, Vladimir Oblast, Russia. The population was 48 as of 2010. There are 2 streets.

== Geography ==
Babyonki is located 10 km southwest of Kovrov (the district's administrative centre) by road. Novy is the nearest rural locality.
