= Yenikha =

Yenikha Ениха
- Village
- Location within Vladimir Oblast Location within Russia
- Coordinates: 56°28′N 41°45′E
- Country: Russia
- Region: Vladimir Oblast
- District: Kovrovsky District
- Time zone: UTC+3:00

Yenikha (Russian: Ениха) is a rural locality (a village) in Klyazminskoye Rural Settlement, Kovrovsky District, Vladimir Oblast, Russia. The population was 4 as of 2010.

== Geography ==
Yenikha is located 35 km northeast of Kovrov (the district's administrative centre) by road. Yudikha is the nearest rural locality.
