= Ryabinnitsy =

Ryabinnitsy Рябинницы
- Village
- Location within Vladimir Oblast Location within Russia
- Coordinates: 56°24′N 41°41′E
- Country: Russia
- Region: Vladimir Oblast
- District: Kovrovsky District
- Time zone: UTC+3:00

Ryabinnitsy (Russian: Рябинницы) is a rural locality (a village) in Klyazminskoye Rural Settlement, Kovrovsky District, Vladimir Oblast, Russia. The population was 6 as of 2010.

== Geography ==
Ryabinnitsy is located 34 km east of Kovrov (the district's administrative centre) by road. Sannikovo is the nearest rural locality.
