= Chentsy =

Chentsy Ченцы
- Village
- Location within Vladimir Oblast Location within Russia
- Coordinates: 56°25′N 41°31′E
- Country: Russia
- Region: Vladimir Oblast
- District: Kovrovsky District
- Time zone: UTC+3:00

Chentsy (Russian: Ченцы) is a rural locality (a village) in Klyazminskoye Rural Settlement, Kovrovsky District, Vladimir Oblast, Russia. The population was 1 as of 2010.

== Geography ==
The village is located 2 km south from Klyazmensky Gorodok, 17 km north-east from Kovrov.
