= Baburino, Kovrovsky District, Vladimir Oblast =

Baburino Бабурино
- Village
- Location within Vladimir Oblast Location within Russia
- Coordinates: 56°16′N 41°21′E
- Country: Russia
- Region: Vladimir Oblast
- District: Kovrovsky District
- Time zone: UTC+3:00

Baburino (Russian: Бабурино) is a rural locality (a village) in Novoselskoye Rural Settlement, Kovrovsky District, Vladimir Oblast, Russia. The population was 4 as of 2010.

== Geography ==
Baburino is located 16 km (9.9 mi) south of Kovrov (the district's administrative centre) by road. Melekhovo is the nearest rural locality.
