= Kuvezino =

Kuvezino Кувезино
- Village
- Location within Vladimir Oblast Location within Russia
- Coordinates: 56°27′N 41°47′E
- Country: Russia
- Region: Vladimir Oblast
- District: Kovrovsky District
- Time zone: UTC+3:00

Kuvezino (Russian: Кувезино) is a rural locality (a village) in Klyazminskoye Rural Settlement, Kovrovsky District, Vladimir Oblast, Russia. The population was 23 as of 2010.

== Geography ==
Kuvezino is located 45 km east of Kovrov (the district's administrative centre) by road. Stepanovo is the nearest rural locality.
