= Gostyukhinskogo karyera =

Gostyukhinskogo karyera Гостюхинского карьера
- Settlement
- Location within Vladimir Oblast Location within Russia
- Coordinates: 56°23′N 41°24′E
- Country: Russia
- Region: Vladimir Oblast
- District: Kovrovsky District
- Time zone: UTC+3:00

Gostyukhinskogo karyera (Russian: Гостюхинского карьера) is a rural locality (a settlement) in Klyazminskoye Rural Settlement, Kovrovsky District, Vladimir Oblast, Russia. The population was 41 as of 2010.

== Geography ==
Gostyukhinskogo karyera is located 10 km east of Kovrov (the district's administrative centre) by road. Ashcherino is the nearest rural locality.
