= Shchibrovo =

Shchibrovo Щиброво
- Village
- Location within Vladimir Oblast Location within Russia
- Coordinates: 56°12′N 41°39′E
- Country: Russia
- Region: Vladimir Oblast
- District: Kovrovsky District
- Time zone: UTC+3:00

Shchibrovo (Russian: Щиброво) is a rural locality (a village) in Ivanovskoye Rural Settlement, Kovrovsky District, Vladimir Oblast, Russia. The population was 1 as of 2010.

== Geography ==
Shchibrovo is located 41 km southeast of Kovrov (the district's administrative centre) by road. Novoye is the nearest rural locality.
