= Pervomaysky, Kovrovsky District, Vladimir Oblast =

Pervomaysky Первомайский
- Settlement
- Location within Vladimir Oblast Location within Russia
- Coordinates: 56°18′N 41°17′E
- Country: Russia
- Region: Vladimir Oblast
- District: Kovrovsky District
- Time zone: UTC+3:00

Pervomaysky (Russian: Первомайский) is a rural locality (a settlement) in Novoselskoye Rural Settlement, Kovrovsky District, Vladimir Oblast, Russia. The population was 1,341 as of 2010. There are 2 streets.

== Geography ==
Pervomaysky is located 8 km south of Kovrov (the district's administrative centre) by road. Melekhovo is the nearest rural locality.
