= Smekhra =

Smekhra Смехра
- Village
- Location within Vladimir Oblast Location within Russia
- Coordinates: 56°28′N 41°29′E
- Country: Russia
- Region: Vladimir Oblast
- District: Kovrovsky District
- Time zone: UTC+3:00

This image is in Smekhra

Smekhra (Russian: Смехра) is a rural locality (a village) in Malyginskoye Rural Settlement, Kovrovsky District, Vladimir Oblast, Russia. The population was 5 as of 2010.

== Geography ==
Smekhra is located on the Smekhra Lake, 27 km northeast of Kovrov (the district's administrative centre) by road. Ilyino is the nearest rural locality.
