= Posyolok sanatoriya imeni Abelmana =

Posyolok sanatoriya imeni Abelmana Посёлок санатория имени Абельмана
- Settlement
- Location within Vladimir Oblast Location within Russia
- Coordinates: 56°24′N 41°23′E
- Country: Russia
- Region: Vladimir Oblast
- District: Kovrovsky District
- Time zone: UTC+3:00

Posyolok sanatoriya imeni Abelmana (Russian: Посёлок санатория имени Абельмана) is a rural locality (a settlement) in Klyazminskoye Rural Settlement, Kovrovsky District, Vladimir Oblast, Russia. The population was 262 as of 2010.

== Geography ==
The settlement is located 8 km northeast of Kovrov (the district's administrative centre) by road. Ashcherino is the nearest rural locality.
