= Velikovo, Kovrovsky District, Vladimir Oblast =

Velikovo Великово
- Selo
- Location within Vladimir Oblast Location within Russia
- Coordinates: 56°14′N 41°17′E
- Country: Russia
- Region: Vladimir Oblast
- District: Kovrovsky District
- Time zone: UTC+3:00

Velikovo (Russian: Великово) is a rural locality (a selo) in Novoselskoye Rural Settlement, Kovrovsky District, Vladimir Oblast, Russia. The population was 177 as of 2010.

== Geography ==
Velikovo is located on the Nerekhta River, 16 km south of Kovrov (the district's administrative centre) by road. Gorozhenovo is the nearest rural locality.
