= Repniki =

Repniki Репники
- Village
- Location within Vladimir Oblast Location within Russia
- Coordinates: 56°27′N 41°34′E
- Country: Russia
- Region: Vladimir Oblast
- District: Kovrovsky District
- Time zone: UTC+3:00

Repniki (Russian: Репники) is a rural locality (a village) in Klyazminskoye Rural Settlement, Kovrovsky District, Vladimir Oblast, Russia. The population was 3 as of 2010.

== Geography ==
Repniki is located 22 km northeast of Kovrov (the district's administrative centre) by road. Knyaginkino is the nearest rural locality.
