= Kostyunino =

Kostyunino Костюнино
- Village
- Location within Vladimir Oblast Location within Russia
- Coordinates: 56°14′N 41°35′E
- Country: Russia
- Region: Vladimir Oblast
- District: Kovrovsky District
- Time zone: UTC+3:00

Kostyunino (Russian: Костюнино) is a rural locality (a village) in Ivanovskoye Rural Settlement, Kovrovsky District, Vladimir Oblast, Russia. The population was 11 as of 2010.

== Geography ==
Kostyunino is located 37 km southeast of Kovrov (the district's administrative centre) by road. Novoye is the nearest rural locality.
