= Shirilikha =

Shirilikha Ширилиха
- Village
- Location within Vladimir Oblast Location within Russia
- Coordinates: 56°27′N 41°35′E
- Country: Russia
- Region: Vladimir Oblast
- District: Kovrovsky District
- Time zone: UTC+3:00

Shirilikha (Russian: Ширилиха) is a rural locality (a village) in Klyazminskoye Rural Settlement, Kovrovsky District, Vladimir Oblast, Russia. The population was 23 as of 2010.

== Geography ==
Shirilikha is located 24 km northeast of Kovrov (the district's administrative centre) by road. Vereyki is the nearest rural locality.
