= Baberikha =

Baberikha Бабериха
- Village
- Location within Vladimir Oblast Location within Russia
- Coordinates: 56°27′N 41°33′E
- Country: Russia
- Region: Vladimir Oblast
- District: Kovrovsky District
- Time zone: UTC+3:00

Baberikha (Russian: Бабериха) is a rural locality (a village) in Klyazminskoye Rural Settlement, Kovrovsky District, Vladimir Oblast, Russia. The population was 2 as of 2010.

== Geography ==
Baberikha is located 21 km northeast of Kovrov (the district's administrative centre) by road. Knyaginkino is the nearest rural locality.
