= Staraya, Kovrovsky District, Vladimir Oblast =

Staraya Старая
- Village
- Location within Vladimir Oblast Location within Russia
- Coordinates: 56°24′N 41°28′E
- Country: Russia
- Region: Vladimir Oblast
- District: Kovrovsky District
- Time zone: UTC+3:00

Staraya (Russian: Старая) is a rural locality (a village) in Klyazminskoye Rural Settlement, Kovrovsky District, Vladimir Oblast, Russia. The population was 414 as of 2010. There are 4 streets.

== Geography ==
Staraya is located 16 km east of Kovrov (the district's administrative centre) by road. Skomorokhovo is the nearest rural locality.
