= Novinki, Kovrovsky District, Vladimir Oblast =

Novinki Новинки
- Village
- Location within Vladimir Oblast Location within Russia
- Coordinates: 56°14′N 41°25′E
- Country: Russia
- Region: Vladimir Oblast
- District: Kovrovsky District
- Time zone: UTC+3:00

Novinki (Russian: Новинки) is a rural locality (a village) in Ivanovskoye Rural Settlement, Kovrovsky District, Vladimir Oblast, Russia. The population was 15 as of 2010. There is 1 street.

== Geography ==
Novinki is located 34 km southeast of Kovrov (the district's administrative centre) by road. Shilovskoye is the nearest rural locality.
