= Medyntsevo =

Medyntsevo Медынцево
- Village
- Location within Vladimir Oblast Location within Russia
- Coordinates: 56°14′N 41°15′E
- Country: Russia
- Region: Vladimir Oblast
- District: Kovrovsky District
- Time zone: UTC+3:00

Medyntsevo (Russian: Медынцево) is a rural locality (a village) in Novoselskoye Rural Settlement, Kovrovsky District, Vladimir Oblast, Russia. The population was 17 as of 2010.

== Geography ==
Medyntsevo is located 19 km southwest of Kovrov (the district's administrative centre) by road. Velikovo is the nearest rural locality.
