= Bolshiye Vsegodichi =

Bolshiye Vsegodichi Большие Всегодичи
- Selo
- Location within Vladimir Oblast Location within Russia
- Coordinates: 56°26′N 41°19′E
- Country: Russia
- Region: Vladimir Oblast
- District: Kovrovsky District
- Time zone: UTC+3:00

Bolshiye Vsegodichi (Russian: Большие Всегодичи) is a rural locality (a selo) in Malyginskoye Rural Settlement, Kovrovsky District, Vladimir Oblast, Russia. The population was 182 as of 2010. There are 7 streets.

== Geography ==
Bolshiye Vsegodichi is located 16 km north of Kovrov (the district's administrative centre) by road. Malye Vsegodichi is the nearest rural locality.
