= Novoberyozovo =

Novoberyozovo Новоберёзово
- Village
- Location within Vladimir Oblast Location within Russia
- Coordinates: 56°00′N 41°39′E
- Country: Russia
- Region: Vladimir Oblast
- District: Kovrovsky District
- Time zone: UTC+3:00

Novoberyozovo (Russian: Новоберёзово) is a rural locality (a village) in Ivanovskoye Rural Settlement, Kovrovsky District, Vladimir Oblast, Russia. The population was 10 as of 2010.

== Geography ==
Novoberyozovo is located 55 km south of Kovrov (the district's administrative centre) by road. Shevinskaya is the nearest rural locality.
