= Krasny Mayak, Vladimir Oblast =

Krasny Mayak Красный Маяк
- Settlement
- Location within Vladimir Oblast Location within Russia
- Coordinates: 56°02′N 41°21′E
- Country: Russia
- Region: Vladimir Oblast
- District: Kovrovsky District
- Time zone: UTC+3:00

Krasny Mayak (Russian: Красный Маяк) is a rural locality (a settlement) in Ivanovskoye Rural Settlement, Kovrovsky District, Vladimir Oblast, Russia. The population was 623 as of 2010. There are 14 streets.

== Geography ==
Krasny Mayak is located 44 km south from Kovrov (the district's administrative centre) by road. Smolino is the nearest rural locality.
