= Gostyukhino (settlement) =

Gostyukhino Гостюхино
- Settlement
- Location within Vladimir Oblast Location within Russia
- Coordinates: 56°23′N 41°26′E
- Country: Russia
- Region: Vladimir Oblast
- District: Kovrovsky District
- Time zone: UTC+3:00

Gostyukhino (Russian: Гостюхино) is a rural locality (a settlement) in the Klyazminskoye Rural Settlement of the Kovrovsky District, Vladimir Oblast, Russia. The population was 31 as of 2010.

== Geography ==
The village is located 9 km south-west from Klyazmensky Gorodok, 10 km east from Kovrov.
