= Peresekino =

Peresekino Пересекино
- Village
- Location within Vladimir Oblast Location within Russia
- Coordinates: 56°13′N 41°13′E
- Country: Russia
- Region: Vladimir Oblast
- District: Kovrovsky District
- Time zone: UTC+3:00

Peresekino (Russian: Пересекино) is a rural locality (a village) in Novoselskoye Rural Settlement, Kovrovsky District, Vladimir Oblast, Russia. The population was 2 as of 2010.

== Geography ==
Peresekino is located 27 km southwest of Kovrov (the district's administrative centre) by road. Pestovo is the nearest rural locality.
