= Uvarovka, Vladimir Oblast =

Uvarovka Уваровка
- Village
- Location within Vladimir Oblast Location within Russia
- Coordinates: 56°01′N 41°35′E
- Country: Russia
- Region: Vladimir Oblast
- District: Kovrovsky District
- Time zone: UTC+3:00

Uvarovka (Russian: Уваровка) is a rural locality (a village) in Ivanovskoye Rural Settlement, Kovrovsky District, Vladimir Oblast, Russia. The population was 94 as of 2010. There are 2 streets.

== Geography ==
Uvarovka is located 56 km south of Kovrov (the district's administrative centre) by road. Shevinskaya is the nearest rural locality.
