= Pobochnevo =

Pobochnevo Побочнево
- Village
- Location within Vladimir Oblast Location within Russia
- Coordinates: 56°25′N 41°10′E
- Country: Russia
- Region: Vladimir Oblast
- District: Kovrovsky District
- Time zone: UTC+3:00

Pobochnevo (Russian: Побочнево) is a rural locality (a village) in Malyginskoye Rural Settlement, Kovrovsky District, Vladimir Oblast, Russia. The population was 25 as of 2010.

== Geography ==
Pobochnevo is located on the Naromsha River, 15 km northwest of Kovrov (the district's administrative centre) by road. Privolye is the nearest rural locality.
