= Kanabyevo =

Kanabyevo Канабьево
- Village
- Location within Vladimir Oblast Location within Russia
- Coordinates: 56°21′N 41°29′E
- Country: Russia
- Region: Vladimir Oblast
- District: Kovrovsky District
- Time zone: UTC+3:00

Kanabyevo (Russian: Канабьево) is a rural locality (a village) in Klyazminskoye Rural Settlement, Kovrovsky District, Vladimir Oblast, Russia. The population was 19 as of 2010.

== Geography ==
Kanabyevo is located 14 km east of Kovrov (the district's administrative centre) by road. Osipovo is the nearest rural locality.
