= Mordviny =

Mordviny Мордвины
- Village
- Location within Vladimir Oblast Location within Russia
- Coordinates: 56°06′N 41°24′E
- Country: Russia
- Region: Vladimir Oblast
- District: Kovrovsky District
- Time zone: UTC+3:00

Mordviny (Russian: Мордвины) is a rural locality (a village) in Ivanovskoye Rural Settlement, Kovrovsky District, Vladimir Oblast, Russia. The population was 38 as of 2010.

== Geography ==
Mordviny is located on the Nerekhta River, 41 km south of Kovrov (the district's administrative centre) by road. Krasny Oktyabr is the nearest rural locality.
