= Sychyovo, Vladimir Oblast =

Sychyovo Сычёво
- Village
- Location within Vladimir Oblast Location within Russia
- Coordinates: 56°17′N 41°11′E
- Country: Russia
- Region: Vladimir Oblast
- District: Kovrovsky District
- Time zone: UTC+3:00

Sychyovo (Russian: Сычёво) is a rural locality (a village) in Novoselskoye Rural Settlement, Kovrovsky District, Vladimir Oblast, Russia. The population was 12 as of 2010.

== Geography ==
Sychyovo is located 14 km southwest of Kovrov (the district's administrative centre) by road. Belkovo is the nearest rural locality.
