= Klyazminsky Gorodok =

Klyazminsky Gorodok Клязьминский Городок
- Selo
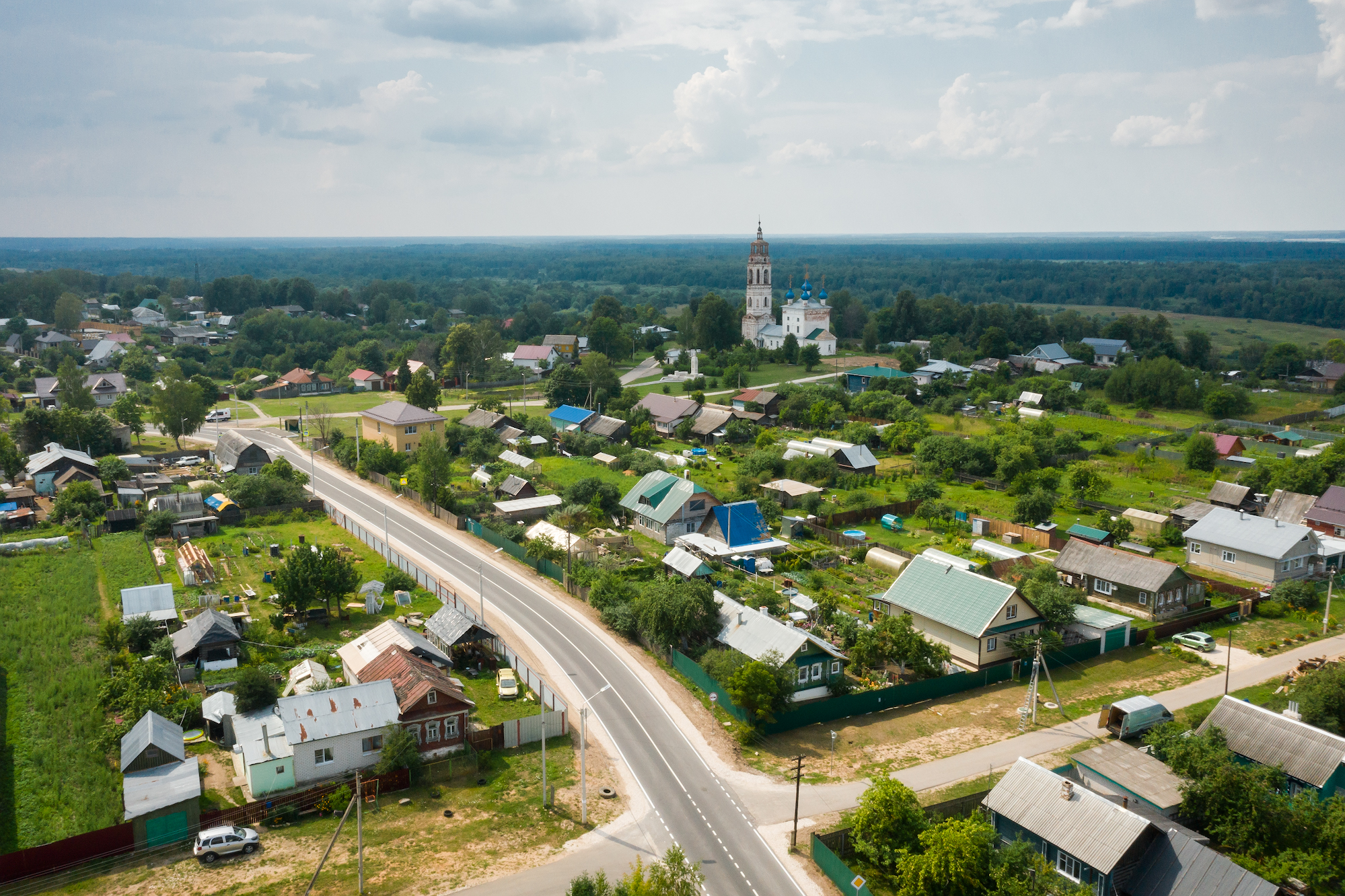
- Regional road 17K-5 in Kliazminski Gorodok

- Location within Vladimir Oblast Location within Russia
- Coordinates: 56°26′N 41°30′E
- Country: Russia
- Region: Vladimir Oblast
- District: Kovrovsky District
- Time zone: UTC+3:00

Klyazminsky Gorodok (Russian: Клязьминский Городок) is a rural locality (a selo) and the administrative center of Klyazminskoye Rural Settlement, Kovrovsky District, Vladimir Oblast, Russia. The population was 919 as of 2010. There are 11 streets.

== Geography ==
Klyazminsky Gorodok is located on the right bank of the Klyazma River, 17 km northeast of Kovrov (the district's administrative centre) by road. Golyshevo is the nearest rural locality.
