= Igumnovo, Vladimir Oblast =

Igumnovo Игумново
- Village
- Location within Vladimir Oblast Location within Russia
- Coordinates: 56°21′N 41°24′E
- Country: Russia
- Region: Vladimir Oblast
- District: Kovrovsky District
- Time zone: UTC+3:00

Igumnovo (Russian: Игумново) is a rural locality (a village) in Klyazminskoye Rural Settlement, Kovrovsky District, Vladimir Oblast, Russia. The population was 24 as of 2010.

== Geography ==
Igumnovo is located 7 km east of Kovrov (the district's administrative centre) by road. Pogorelka is the nearest rural locality.
