= Starodub-on-the-Klyazma =

Former city in Vladimir Oblast, Russia, est. 1152 and destroyed in 1609

Coordinates: 56°27′25″N 41°34′9″E

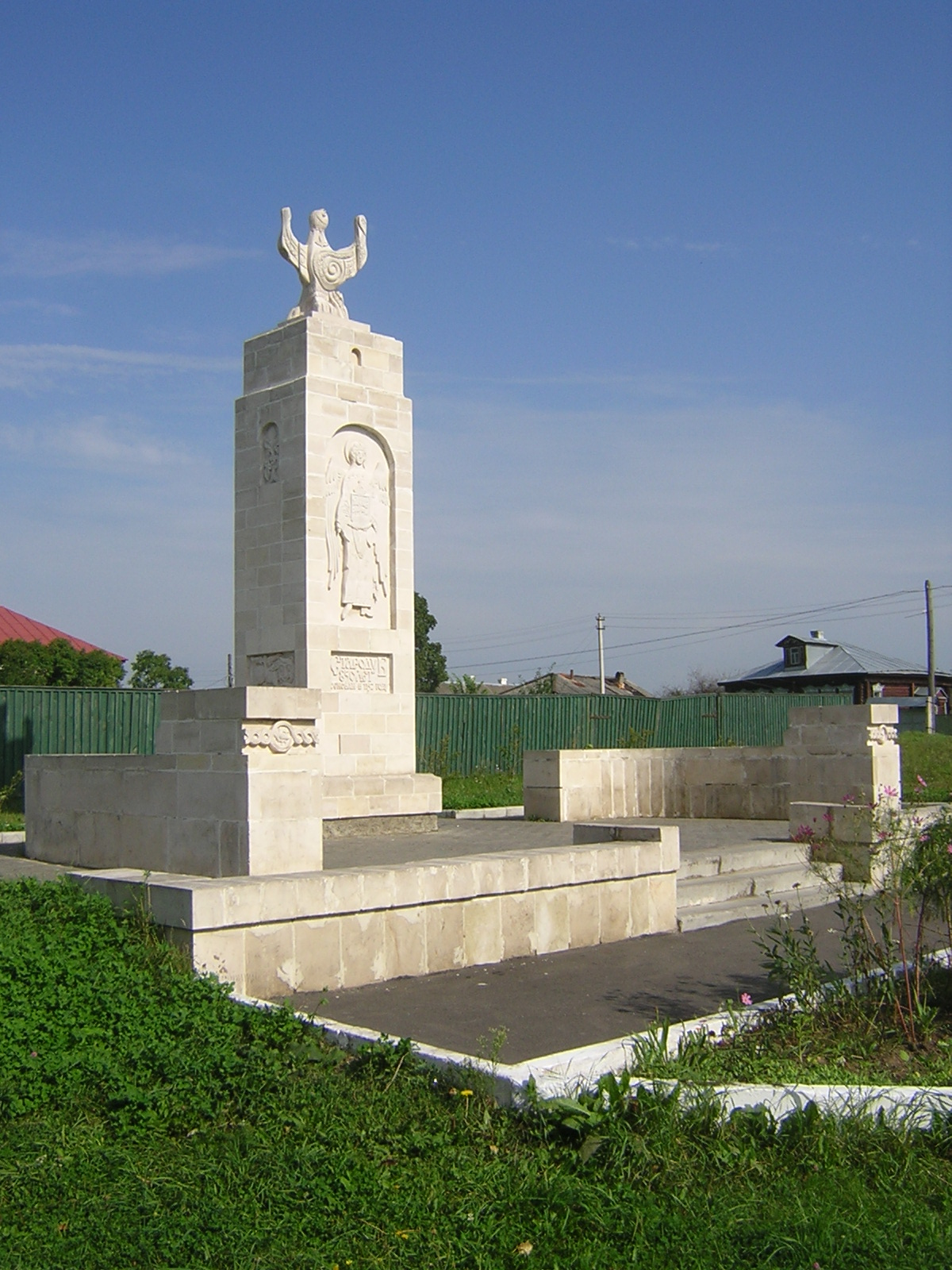
A monument commemorating the 850th anniversary of Starodub

Starodub-on-the-Klyazma (Russian: Староду́б-на-Кля́зьме, IPA: [stərɐˈdub nə ˈklʲæzʲmʲɪ]) was a prominent urban centre of Russian Opolye from the 12th until the 14th century. Like so many towns in the vicinity, it was named by migrating population for a southern city they came from, in this case, for Starodub in Severia. The town was on the bank of the Klyazma River about twelve kilometres from the modern-day Kovrov. Nowadays, the village of Klyazminsky Gorodok stands on the spot.

During the Mongol invasion of Russia, the youngest of Vsevolod III's sons, Ivan, made Starodub his seat (1238). His descendants ruled the tiniest of Russian principalities for more than a century, desperately trying to fend off attacks by two powerful neighbours—Muscovy and Nizhny Novgorod. Their ephemeral power came to an end in the 1370s, when the town was eventually annexed by Dmitry Donskoy. Thereupon numerous scions of Starodub dynasty moved to Moscow, where they formed the families of Princes Gagarin, Khilkoff, Romodanovsky, Pozharsky, and many others.

During the Time of Troubles, the town was completely burnt to the ground by the Polish warlord Alexander Jozef Lisowski, who ravaged the area in March 1609. Some historians believe that Prince Dmitry Pozharsky, who helped Russia to survive those turbulent times, lies buried in Starodub, the demesne of his forefathers.

== Sources ==
- "Кляземский городок" . Brockhaus and Efron Encyclopedic Dictionary (in Russian). 1906.
