= Pustynka, Vladimir Oblast =

Village in Kovrovsky District, Russia

Pustynka Пустынка
- Village
- Location within Vladimir Oblast Location within Russia
- Coordinates: 56°26′N 41°25′E
- Country: Russia
- Region: Vladimir Oblast
- District: Kovrovsky District
- Time zone: UTC+3:00

Pustynka (Russian: Пустынка) is a rural locality (village) in Malyginskoye Rural Settlement, Kovrovsky District, Vladimir Oblast, Russia. The population was 6 at the 2010 census.

== Geography ==
Pustynka is located 22 km northeast of Kovrov, the administrative center of the district, by road. Panyukino is the nearest rural locality.
