= Babikovka =

Babikovka Бабиковка
- Village
- Location within Vladimir Oblast Location within Russia
- Coordinates: 56°28′N 41°22′E
- Country: Russia
- Region: Vladimir Oblast
- District: Kovrovsky District
- Time zone: UTC+3:00

Babikovka (Russian: Бабиковка) is a rural locality (a village) in Malyginskoye Rural Settlement, Kovrovsky District, Vladimir Oblast, Russia. The population was 8 as of 2010.

== Geography ==
Babikovka is located 20 km north of Kovrov (the district's administrative centre) by road. Rogozinikha is the nearest rural locality.
