= Ivakino, Vladimir Oblast =

Ivakino Ивакино
- Village
- Location within Vladimir Oblast Location within Russia
- Coordinates: 56°27′N 41°21′E
- Country: Russia
- Region: Vladimir Oblast
- District: Kovrovsky District
- Time zone: UTC+3:00

Ivakino (Russian: Ивакино) is a rural locality (a village) in Malyginskoye Rural Settlement, Kovrovsky District, Vladimir Oblast, Russia. The population was 6 as of 2010.

== Geography ==
Ivakino is located 19 km north of Kovrov (the district's administrative centre) by road. Shmelevo is the nearest rural locality.
