= Bedrino, Vladimir Oblast =

Bedrino Бедрино
- Village
- Location within Vladimir Oblast Location within Russia
- Coordinates: 56°06′N 41°20′E
- Country: Russia
- Region: Vladimir Oblast
- District: Kovrovsky District
- Time zone: UTC+3:00

Bedrino (Russian: Бедрино) is a rural locality (a village) in Ivanovskoye Rural Settlement, Kovrovsky District, Vladimir Oblast, Russia. The population was 19 as of 2010.

== Geography ==
Bedrino is located 32 km south of Kovrov (the district's administrative centre) by road. Krasny Oktyabr is the nearest rural locality.
