= Pogorelka, Vladimir Oblast =

Pogorelka Погорелка
- Village
- Location within Vladimir Oblast Location within Russia
- Coordinates: 56°21′N 41°22′E
- Country: Russia
- Region: Vladimir Oblast
- District: Kovrovsky District
- Time zone: UTC+3:00

Pogorelka (Russian: Погорелка) is a rural locality (a village) in Klyazminskoye Rural Settlement, Kovrovsky District, Vladimir Oblast, Russia. The population was 33 as of 2010.

== Geography ==
Pogorelka is located 5 km east of Kovrov (the district's administrative centre) by road. Kovrov is the nearest rural locality.
