= Sychevo, Cherepovetsky District, Vologda Oblast =

Sychevo Сычево
- Village
- Location within Vologda Oblast Location within Russia
- Coordinates: 58°54′N 38°31′E
- Country: Russia
- Region: Vologda Oblast
- District: Cherepovetsky District
- Time zone: UTC+3:00

Sychevo (Russian: Сычево) is a rural locality (a village) in Yugskoye Rural Settlement, Cherepovetsky District, Vologda Oblast, Russia. The population was 18 as of 2002.

== Geography ==
Sychevo is located 53 km southeast of Cherepovets (the district's administrative centre) by road. Aksenovo is the nearest rural locality.
