= Sychevo, Ustyuzhensky District, Vologda Oblast =

Sychevo Сычево
- Village
- Location within Vologda Oblast Location within Russia
- Coordinates: 58°30′N 36°20′E
- Country: Russia
- Region: Vologda Oblast
- District: Ustyuzhensky District
- Time zone: UTC+3:00

Sychevo (Russian: Сычево) is a rural locality (a village) in Nikolskoye Rural Settlement, Ustyuzhensky District, Vologda Oblast, Russia. The population was 71 as of 2002.

== Geography ==
Sychevo is located 42 km (26 mi) southwest of Ustyuzhna (the district's administrative centre) by road. Izlyadeyevo is the nearest rural locality.
