= Igumnovo, Ustyuzhensky District, Vologda Oblast =

Igumnovo Игумново
- Village
- Location within Vologda Oblast Location within Russia
- Coordinates: 58°50′N 36°29′E
- Country: Russia
- Region: Vologda Oblast
- District: Ustyuzhensky District
- Time zone: UTC+3:00

Igumnovo (Russian: Игумново) is a rural locality (a village) in Ustyuzhenskoye Rural Settlement, Ustyuzhensky District, Vologda Oblast, Russia. The population was 38 as of 2002.

== Geography ==
Igumnovo is located 4 km (2.5 mi) east of Ustyuzhna (the district's administrative centre) by road. Ganki is the nearest rural locality.
