= Ivakino, Vologodsky District, Vologda Oblast =

Ivakino Ивакино
- Village
- Location within Vologda Oblast Location within Russia
- Coordinates: 59°05′N 39°15′E
- Country: Russia
- Region: Vologda Oblast
- District: Vologodsky District
- Time zone: UTC+3:00

Ivakino (Russian: Ивакино) is a rural locality (a village) in Staroselskoye Rural Settlement, Vologodsky District, Vologda Oblast, Russia. The population was 4 as of 2002.

== Geography ==
Ivakino is located 47 km southwest of Vologda (the district's administrative centre) by road. Novgorodovo is the nearest rural locality.
