= Pogorelka, Vozhegodsky District, Vologda Oblast =

Pogorelka Погорелка
- Village
- Location within Vologda Oblast Location within Russia
- Coordinates: 60°30′N 41°09′E
- Country: Russia
- Region: Vologda Oblast
- District: Vozhegodsky District
- Time zone: UTC+3:00

Pogorelka (Russian: Погорелка) is a rural locality (a village) in Mishutinskoye Rural Settlement, Vozhegodsky District, Vologda Oblast, Russia. The population was 8 as of 2002.

== Geography ==
Pogorelka is located 61 km east of Vozhega (the district's administrative centre) by road. Gorka is the nearest rural locality.
