= Sychevo, Vologodsky District, Vologda Oblast =

Sychevo Сычево
- Village
- Location within Vologda Oblast Location within Russia
- Coordinates: 59°18′N 39°19′E
- Country: Russia
- Region: Vologda Oblast
- District: Vologodsky District
- Time zone: UTC+3:00

Sychevo (Russian: Сычево) is a rural locality (a selo) in Staroselskoye Rural Settlement, Vologodsky District, Vologda Oblast, Russia. The population was 2 as of 2002.

== Geography ==
Sychevo is located 68 km northwest of Vologda (the district's administrative centre) by road. Gorka-Pokrovskaya is the nearest rural locality.
