= Kovrov =

City in Vladimir Oblast, Russia

Kovrov Ковров
- City
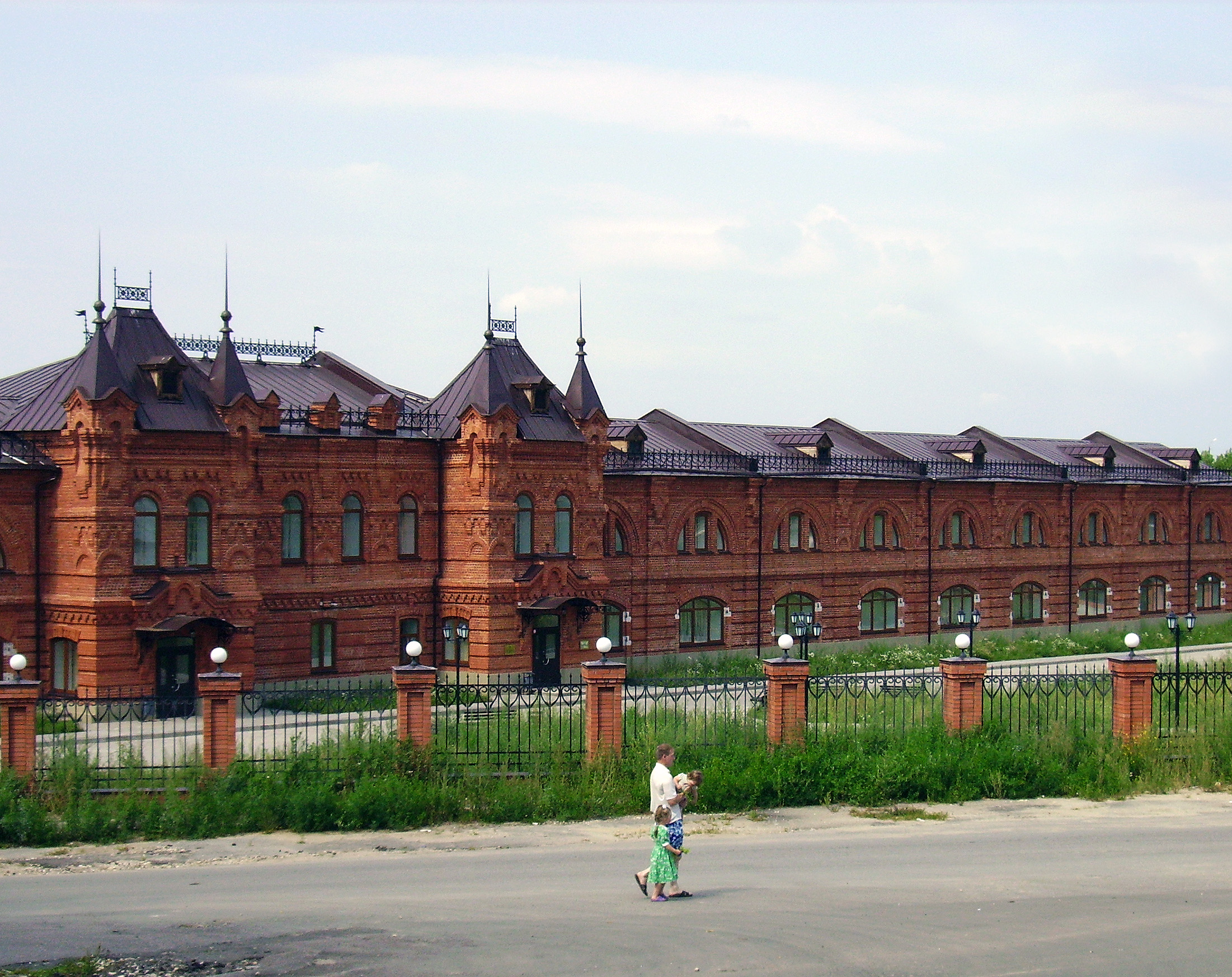
- Kovrov Museum Saint John the Warrior Church City council

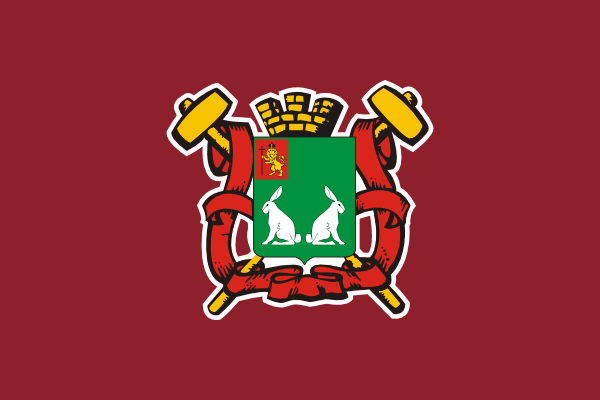
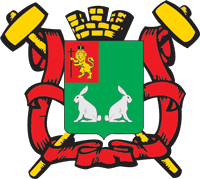
- Flag Coat of arms
- Interactive map of Kovrov
- Location of Kovrov Kovrov (Europe) Kovrov (Russia)
- Coordinates: 56°22′06″N 41°18′39″E
- Country: Russia
- Federal subject: Vladimir Oblast
- First mentioned: 1157
- City status since: 1778

Government
  - Body: Council of People's Deputies

Area
  - Total: 57.4 km^{2} (22.2 sq mi)
- Elevation: 125 m (410 ft)

Population (2010 Census)
  - Total: 145,214
  - Estimate (2025): 127,831 (−12%)
  - Rank: 118th in 2010
  - Density: 2,530/km^{2} (6,550/sq mi)

Administrative status
  - Subordinated to: City of Kovrov
  - Capital of: Kovrovsky District, City of Kovrov

Municipal status
  - Urban okrug: Kovrov Urban Okrug
  - Capital of: Kovrov Urban Okrug, Kovrovsky Municipal District
- Time zone: UTC+3 (MSK)
- Postal code: 601900
- Dialing code: +7 49232
- OKTMO ID: 17725000001
- Website: kovrov-gorod.ru

Kovrov (Russian: Ковро́в) is a city in Vladimir Oblast, Russia, located on the right bank of the Klyazma River, a tributary of the Oka. Kovrov's population as of the 2021 Census was 132,417, down from 145,214 recorded in the 2010 Census, and further down from 155,499 recorded in the 2002 Census and 159,942 recorded in the 1989 Census. In terms of population, it is the second-largest city in Vladimir Oblast after Vladimir. In 1977, Kovrov's population had been estimated at 140,000.

== History ==
Overshadowed by the neighboring Starodub-on-the-Klyazma since the 12th century, Kovrov was eventually granted town status in 1778. On July 13, 1978, the city's 200th anniversary, Kovrov was decorated with the Order of the Red Banner of Labor.

== Administrative and municipal status ==
Within the framework of administrative divisions, Kovrov serves as the administrative center of Kovrovsky District, even though it is not a part of it. As an administrative division, it is incorporated separately as the City of Kovrov—an administrative unit with the status equal to that of the districts. As a municipal division, the City of Kovrov is incorporated as Kovrov Urban Okrug.

== Economy ==
Kovrov is a major center of Russia's defense industry, specializing in mechanical engineering, metal processing, textile and light industry, and building industry. Kovrov is home to Degtyaryov plant, Kovrov Mechanical Factory, Kovrov Electromechanical Factory, and CB Armatura.

=== Transportation ===
Located on the Moscow–Nizhny Novgorod rail line—one of Russia's oldest railroads and one of the alternative routes of the Trans-Siberian Railway—Kovrov is also connected to Murom (which is served by the Moscow–Kazan rail line) by the Murom Railway.

== Climate ==
Kovrov has a humid continental climate (Köppen Dfb). The city has warm summers and relatively cold winters with frequent snowfall. The warmest month is July, the coldest month is January. The highest amount of precipitation is on average in July, the driest month is March.

== Sports ==
Since 2012, Kovrov has annually hosted the January classic-style cross-country skiing competition "In Memory of Ye. A. Ogarkov" (Pamyati Ogarkova Ye.A.) at the Cherny Dol ski track, dedicated to Yevgeny Andreyevich Ogarkov, a coach who worked at the V. A. Degtyaryov Sports Club. In certain years, the tournament holds the status of the Vladimir Oblast Championship and Junior Championship, attracting participants from several regions.

== Twin towns and sister cities ==
Kovrov is twinned with:

- Brest, Belarus
- Liberec, Czech Republic
