= Kovrovsky District =

Kovrovsky District Ковровский район (Russian)
- District
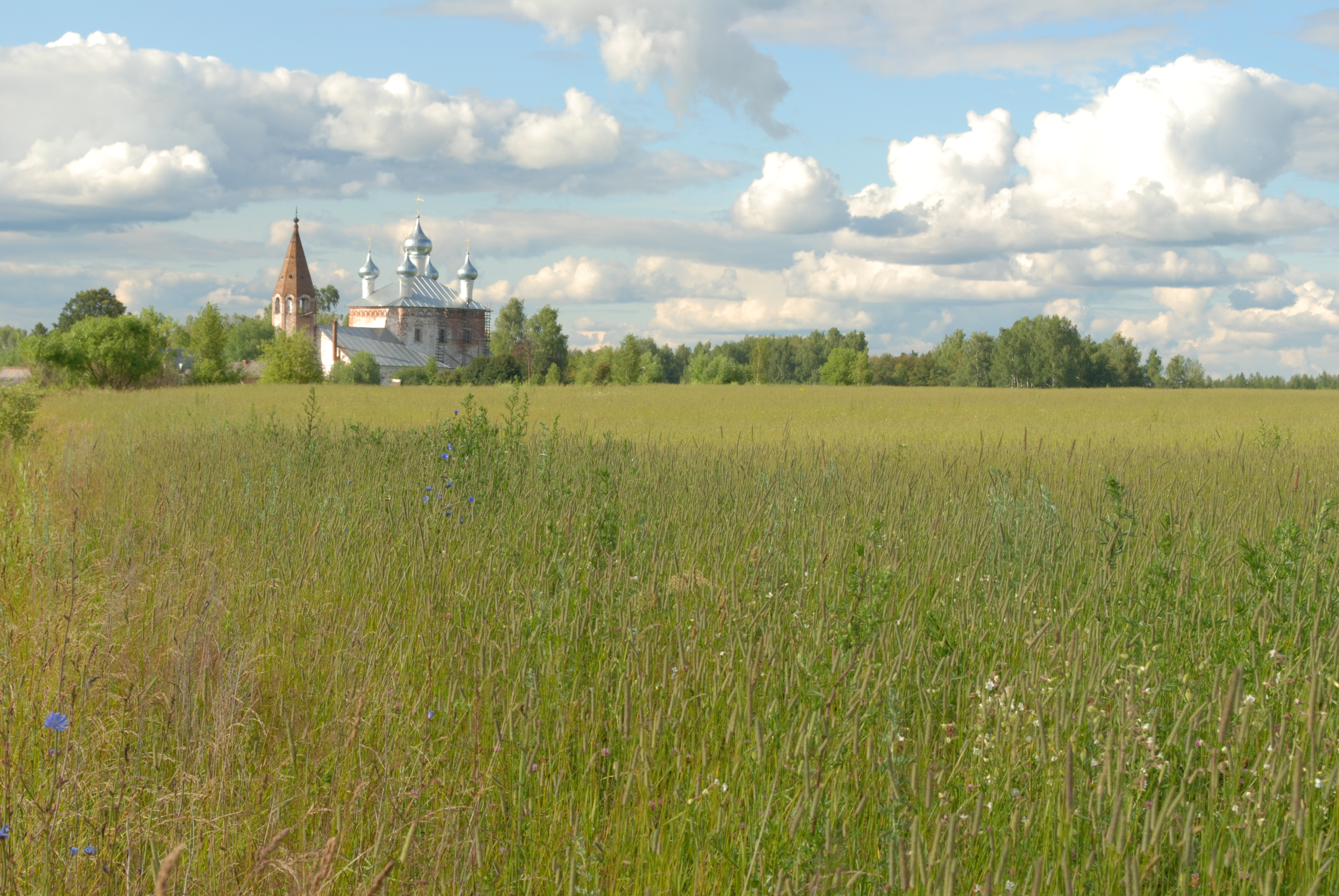
- Church of Our Lady of Kazan, village Malyshevo, Kovrovsky

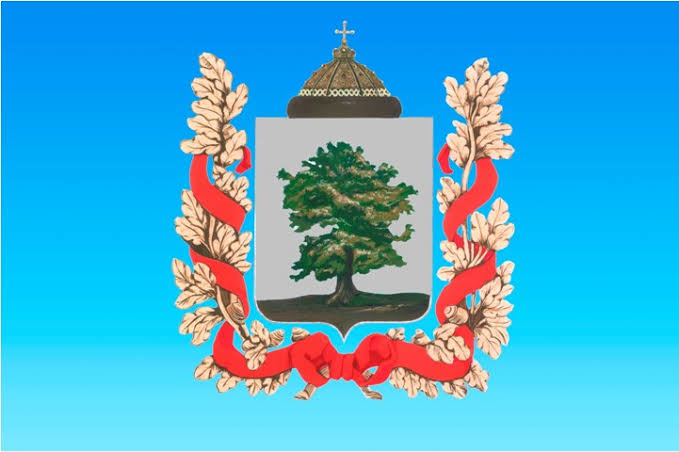
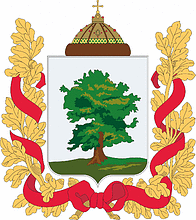
- Flag Coat of arms
- Location of Kovrovsky District in Vladimir Oblast
- Coordinates: 56°21′N 41°19′E
- Country: Russia
- Federal subject: Vladimir Oblast
- Established: 10 April 1929
- Administrative center: Kovrov

Area
  - Total: 1,817 km^{2} (702 sq mi)

Population (2010 Census)
  - Total: 31,477
  - Density: 17.32/km^{2} (44.87/sq mi)
  - Urban: 22.4%
  - Rural: 77.6%

Administrative structure
  - Inhabited localities: 1 urban-type settlements, 171 rural localities

Municipal structure
  - Municipally incorporated as: Kovrovsky Municipal District
  - Municipal divisions: 1 urban settlements, 4 rural settlements
- Time zone: UTC+3 (MSK)
- OKTMO ID: 17635000
- Website: http://www.akrvo.ru/

Kovrovsky District (Russian: Ковро́вский райо́н) is an administrative and municipal district (raion), one of the sixteen in Vladimir Oblast, Russia. It is located in the north of the oblast. The area of the district is 1,817 square kilometers (702 sq mi). Its administrative center is the city of Kovrov (which is not administratively a part of the district). Population: 30,174 (2021 census); 31,477 (2010 census); 31,148 (2002 Census); 30,044 (1989 Soviet census).

== Administrative and municipal status ==
Within the framework of administrative divisions, Kovrovsky District is one of the sixteen in the oblast. The city of Kovrov serves as its administrative center, despite being incorporated separately as an administrative unit with the status equal to that of the districts.

As a municipal division, the district is incorporated as Kovrovsky Municipal District. The City of Kovrov is incorporated separately from the district as Kovrov Urban Okrug.
