= Fedorkovo =

Fedorkovo (Russian: Федорково) is the name of several rural localities in Russia.

== Ivanovo Oblast ==
As of 2010, four rural localities in Ivanovo Oblast bear this name:

- Fedorkovo, Lezhnevsky District, Ivanovo Oblast, a village in Lezhnevsky District
- Fedorkovo, Rodnikovsky District, Ivanovo Oblast, a village in Rodnikovsky District
- Fedorkovo, Shuysky District, Ivanovo Oblast, a village in Shuysky District
- Fedorkovo, Yuryevetsky District, Ivanovo Oblast, a village in Yuryevetsky District

== Kostroma Oblast ==
As of 2010, five rural localities in Kostroma Oblast bear this name:

- Fedorkovo, Kologrivsky District, Kostroma Oblast, a village in Sukhoverkhovskoye Settlement of Kologrivsky District
- Fedorkovo, Chapayevskoye Settlement, Krasnoselsky District, Kostroma Oblast, two villages in Chapayevskoye Settlement of Krasnoselsky District
- Fedorkovo, Sidorovskoye Settlement, Krasnoselsky District, Kostroma Oblast, a village in Sidorovskoye Settlement of Krasnoselsky District
- Fedorkovo, Ostrovsky District, Kostroma Oblast, a village in Klevantsovskoye Settlement of Ostrovsky District

== Novgorod Oblast ==
As of 2010, three rural localities in Novgorod Oblast bear this name:

- Fedorkovo, Borovichsky District, Novgorod Oblast, a village in Zhelezkovskoye Settlement of Borovichsky District
- Fedorkovo, Okulovsky District, Novgorod Oblast, a village in Berezovikskoye Settlement of Okulovsky District
- Fedorkovo, Parfinsky District, Novgorod Oblast, a village in Fedorkovskoye Settlement of Parfinsky District

== Pskov Oblast ==
As of 2010, six rural localities in Pskov Oblast bear this name:

- Fedorkovo, Bezhanitsky District, Pskov Oblast, a village in Bezhanitsky District
- Fedorkovo, Loknyansky District, Pskov Oblast, a village in Loknyansky District
- Fedorkovo (Zvonskaya Rural Settlement), Opochetsky District, Pskov Oblast, a village in Opochetsky District; municipally, a part of Zvonskaya Rural Settlement of that district
- Fedorkovo (Bolgatovskaya Rural Settlement), Opochetsky District, Pskov Oblast, a village in Opochetsky District; municipally, a part of Bolgatovskaya Rural Settlement of that district
- Fedorkovo, Pytalovsky District, Pskov Oblast, a village in Pytalovsky District
- Fedorkovo, Velikoluksky District, Pskov Oblast, a village in Velikoluksky District

== Tver Oblast ==
As of 2010, four rural localities in Tver Oblast bear this name:

- Fedorkovo, Kuvshinovsky District, Tver Oblast, a village in Pryamukhinskoye Rural Settlement of Kuvshinovsky District
- Fedorkovo, Staritsky District, Tver Oblast, a village in Novo-Yamskoye Rural Settlement of Staritsky District
- Fedorkovo, Udomelsky District, Tver Oblast, a village in Kotlovanskoye Rural Settlement of Udomelsky District
- Fedorkovo, Vesyegonsky District, Tver Oblast, a village in Yegonskoye Rural Settlement of Vesyegonsky District

== Vladimir Oblast ==
As of 2010, three rural localities in Vladimir Oblast bear this name:

- Fedorkovo, Gorokhovetsky District, Vladimir Oblast, a village in Gorokhovetsky District
- Fedorkovo, Muromsky District, Vladimir Oblast, a village in Muromsky District
- Fedorkovo, Vyaznikovsky District, Vladimir Oblast, a village in Vyaznikovsky District

== Vologda Oblast ==
As of 2010, four rural localities in Vologda Oblast bear this name:

- Fedorkovo, Cherepovetsky District, Vologda Oblast, a village in Yaganovsky Selsoviet of Cherepovetsky District
- Fedorkovo, Gryazovetsky District, Vologda Oblast, a village in Komyansky Selsoviet of Gryazovetsky District
- Fedorkovo, Kirillovsky District, Vologda Oblast, a village in Kolkachsky Selsoviet of Kirillovsky District
- Fedorkovo, Ust-Kubinsky District, Vologda Oblast, a village in Troitsky Selsoviet of Ust-Kubinsky District

== Yaroslavl Oblast ==
As of 2010, ten rural localities in Yaroslavl Oblast bear this name:

- Fedorkovo, Bolsheselsky Rural Okrug, Bolsheselsky District, Yaroslavl Oblast, a village in Bolsheselsky Rural Okrug of Bolsheselsky District
- Fedorkovo, Markovsky Rural Okrug, Bolsheselsky District, Yaroslavl Oblast, a village in Markovsky Rural Okrug of Bolsheselsky District
- Fedorkovo, Breytovsky District, Yaroslavl Oblast, a village in Breytovsky Rural Okrug of Breytovsky District
- Fedorkovo, Danilovsky District, Yaroslavl Oblast, a village in Maryinsky Rural Okrug of Danilovsky District
- Fedorkovo, Myshkinsky District, Yaroslavl Oblast, a village in Bogorodsky Rural Okrug of Myshkinsky District
- Fedorkovo, Beloselsky Rural Okrug, Poshekhonsky District, Yaroslavl Oblast, a village in Beloselsky Rural Okrug of Poshekhonsky District
- Fedorkovo, Fedorkovsky Rural Okrug, Poshekhonsky District, Yaroslavl Oblast, a selo in Fedorkovsky Rural Okrug of Poshekhonsky District
- Fedorkovo, Rostovsky District, Yaroslavl Oblast, a village in Fatyanovsky Rural Okrug of Rostovsky District
- Fedorkovo, Tutayevsky District, Yaroslavl Oblast, a village in Fominsky Rural Okrug of Tutayevsky District
- Fedorkovo, Uglichsky District, Yaroslavl Oblast, a village in Ploskinsky Rural Okrug of Uglichsky District
