= Korobeykino =

Village in Kursk Oblast, Russia

Korobeykino Коробейкино
- Village
- Location within Ivanovo Oblast Location within Russia
- Coordinates: 57°00′N 41°46′E
- Country: Russia
- Region: Ivanovo Oblast
- District: Rodnikovsky District
- Time zone: UTC+3:00

Korobeykino (Russian: Коробейкино) is a rural locality (a village) in Rodnikovsky District, Ivanovo Oblast, Russia. Population: 63 (2010 census);

== Geography ==
This rural locality is located 12 kilometres (7.5 mi) from Rodniki (the district's administrative centre), 49 kilometres (30 mi) from Ivanovo (capital of Ivanovo Oblast) and 287 kilometres (178 mi) from Moscow. Golygino is the nearest rural locality.
