= Nikulskoye, Rodnikovsky District, Ivanovo Oblast =

Nikulskoye Никульское
- Village
- Location within Ivanovo Oblast Location within Russia
- Coordinates: 57°03′N 41°29′E
- Country: Russia
- Region: Ivanovo Oblast
- District: Rodnikovsky District
- Time zone: UTC+3:00

Nikulskoye (Russian: Никульское) is a rural locality (a selo) in Rodnikovsky District, Ivanovo Oblast, Russia. Population: 146 (2010 census);

== Geography ==
This rural locality is located 15 kilometres (9.3 mi) from Rodniki (the district's administrative centre), 33 kilometres (21 mi) from Ivanovo (capital of Ivanovo Oblast) and 276 kilometres (171 mi) from Moscow. Sennikovo is the nearest rural locality.
