= Lomy Malye =

Lomy Malye Ломы Малые
- Village
- Location within Ivanovo Oblast Location within Russia
- Coordinates: 56°59′N 41°54′E
- Country: Russia
- Region: Ivanovo Oblast
- District: Rodnikovsky District
- Time zone: UTC+3:00

Lomy Malye (Russian: Ломы Малые) is a rural locality (a village) in Rodnikovsky District, Ivanovo Oblast, Russia. Population: 44 (2010 census);

== Geography ==
This rural locality is located 17 kilometres (11 mi) from Rodniki (the district's administrative centre), 57 kilometres (35 mi) from Ivanovo (capital of Ivanovo Oblast) and 294 kilometres (183 mi) from Moscow. Leshakhovo is the nearest rural locality.
