= Bolotnovo =

Bolotnovo Болотново
- Village
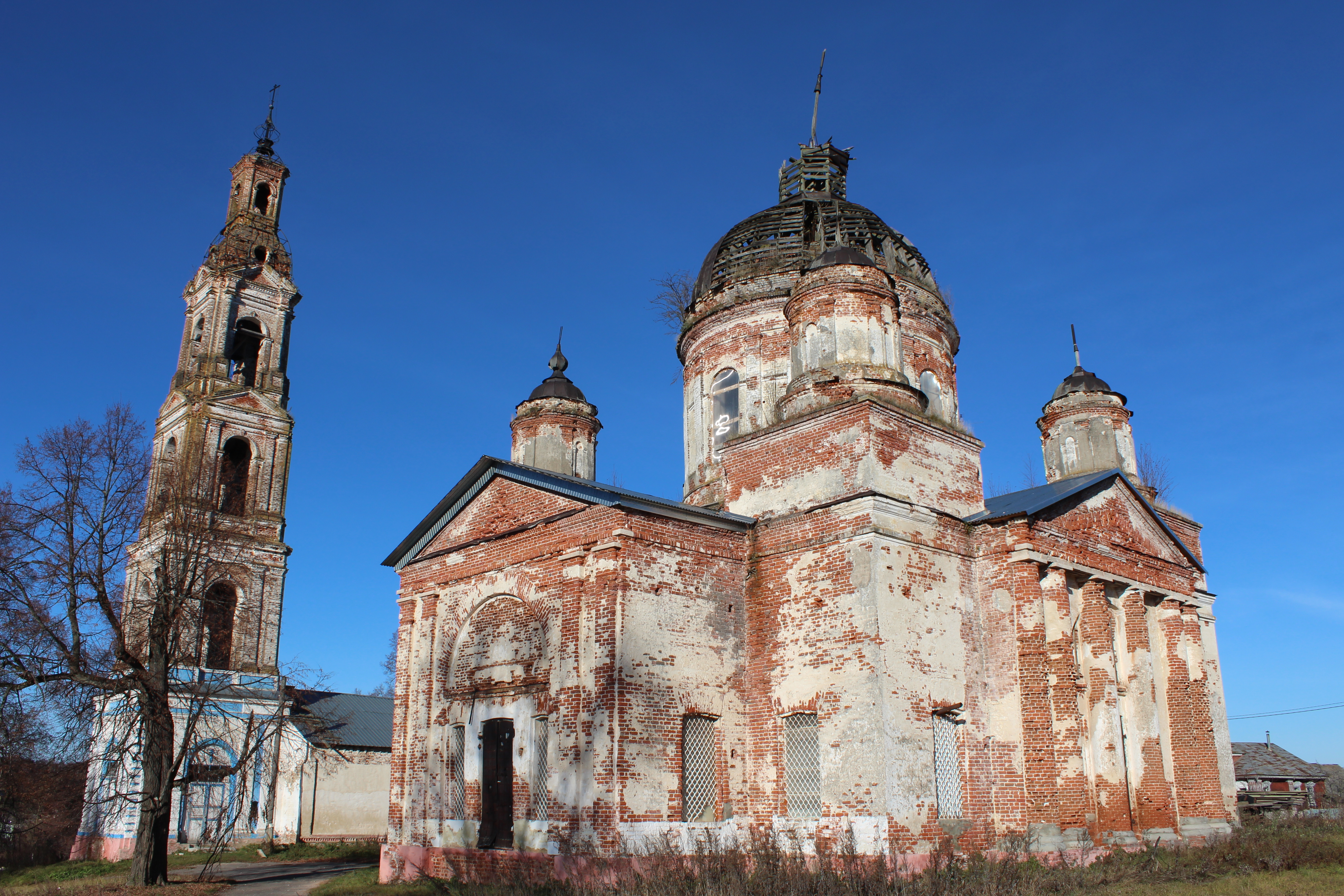

- Location within Ivanovo Oblast Location within Russia
- Coordinates: 56°57′N 41°52′E
- Country: Russia
- Region: Ivanovo Oblast
- District: Rodnikovsky District
- Time zone: UTC+3:00

Bolotnovo (Russian: Болотново) is a rural locality (a selo) in Rodnikovsky District, Ivanovo Oblast, Russia. Population: 415 (2010 census);

== Geography ==
This rural locality is located 18 kilometres (11 mi) from Rodniki (the district's administrative centre), 55 kilometres (34 mi) from Ivanovo (capital of Ivanovo Oblast) and 291 kilometres (181 mi) from Moscow. Rastavlevo is the nearest rural locality.
