= Vedrovo, Ivanovo Oblast =

Vedrovo Ведрово
- Village
- Location within Ivanovo Oblast Location within Russia
- Coordinates: 56°56′N 41°54′E
- Country: Russia
- Region: Ivanovo Oblast
- District: Rodnikovsky District
- Time zone: UTC+3:00

Vedrovo (Russian: Ведрово) is a rural locality (a village) in Rodnikovsky District, Ivanovo Oblast, Russia. Population: 7 (2010 census);

== Geography ==
This rural locality is located 21 kilometres (13 mi) from Rodniki (the district's administrative centre), 57 kilometres (35 mi) from Ivanovo (capital of Ivanovo Oblast) and 292 kilometres (181 mi) from Moscow. Degtyarnovo is the nearest rural locality.
