= Khripelevo, Ivanovo Oblast =

Khripelevo Хрипелево
- Village
- Location within Ivanovo Oblast Location within Russia
- Coordinates: 57°02′N 41°34′E
- Country: Russia
- Region: Ivanovo Oblast
- District: Rodnikovsky District
- Time zone: UTC+3:00

Khripelevo (Russian: Хрипелево) is a rural locality (a selo) in Rodnikovsky District, Ivanovo Oblast, Russia. Population: 53 (2010 census);

== Geography ==
This rural locality is located 12 kilometres (7.5 mi) from Rodniki (the district's administrative centre), 37 kilometres (23 mi) from Ivanovo (capital of Ivanovo Oblast) and 279 kilometres (173 mi) from Moscow. Demenovo is the nearest rural locality.
