= Mezhi =

Mezhi Межи
- Village
- Location within Ivanovo Oblast Location within Russia
- Coordinates: 57°14′N 41°35′E
- Country: Russia
- Region: Ivanovo Oblast
- District: Rodnikovsky District
- Time zone: UTC+3:00

Mezhi (Russian: Межи) is a rural locality (a selo) in Rodnikovsky District, Ivanovo Oblast, Russia. Population: 86 (2010 census);

== Geography ==
This rural locality is located 17 kilometres (11 mi) from Rodniki (the district's administrative centre), 47 kilometres (29 mi) from Ivanovo (capital of Ivanovo Oblast) and 291 kilometres (181 mi) from Moscow. Afonasovo is the nearest rural locality.
