= Isayevo, Rodnikovsky District, Ivanovo Oblast =

Isayevo Исаево
- Village
- Location within Ivanovo Oblast Location within Russia
- Coordinates: 57°09′N 41°25′E
- Country: Russia
- Region: Ivanovo Oblast
- District: Rodnikovsky District
- Time zone: UTC+3:00

Isayevo (Russian: Исаево) is a rural locality (a village) in Rodnikovsky District, Ivanovo Oblast, Russia. Population: 7 (2010 census);

== Geography ==
This rural locality is located 19 kilometres (12 mi) from Rodniki (the district's administrative centre), 33 kilometres (21 mi) from Ivanovo (capital of Ivanovo Oblast) and 278 kilometres (173 mi) from Moscow. Shubino is the nearest rural locality.
