= Borshchevo, Ivanovo Oblast =

Borshchevo Борщево
- Village
- Location within Ivanovo Oblast Location within Russia
- Coordinates: 57°04′N 41°45′E
- Country: Russia
- Region: Ivanovo Oblast
- District: Rodnikovsky District
- Time zone: UTC+3:00

Borshchevo (Russian: Борщево) is a rural locality (a village) in Rodnikovsky District, Ivanovo Oblast, Russia. Population: 28 (2010 census);

== Geography ==
This rural locality is located 4 kilometres (2.5 mi) from Rodniki (the district's administrative centre), 49 kilometres (30 mi) from Ivanovo (capital of Ivanovo Oblast) and 290 kilometres (180 mi) from Moscow. Podyelnovo is the nearest rural locality.
