= Zhzhonikha =

Zhzhonikha Жжониха
- Village
- Location within Ivanovo Oblast Location within Russia
- Coordinates: 57°02′N 41°43′E
- Country: Russia
- Region: Ivanovo Oblast
- District: Rodnikovsky District
- Time zone: UTC+3:00

Zhzhonikha (Russian: Жжониха) is a rural locality (a village) in Rodnikovsky District, Ivanovo Oblast, Russia. Population: 10 (2010 census);

== Geography ==
This rural locality is located 8 kilometres (5.0 mi) from Rodniki (the district's administrative centre), 46 kilometres (29 mi) from Ivanovo (capital of Ivanovo Oblast) and 287 kilometres (178 mi) from Moscow. Ploskovo is the nearest rural locality.
