= Mostishchi, Ivanovo Oblast =

Mostishchi Мостищи
- Village
- Location within Ivanovo Oblast Location within Russia
- Coordinates: 57°06′N 41°33′E
- Country: Russia
- Region: Ivanovo Oblast
- District: Rodnikovsky District
- Time zone: UTC+3:00

Mostishchi (Russian: Мостищи) is a rural locality (a village) in Rodnikovsky District, Ivanovo Oblast, Russia. Population: 14 (2010 census);

== Geography ==
This rural locality is located 11 kilometres (6.8 mi) from Rodniki (the district's administrative centre), 38 kilometres (24 mi) from Ivanovo (capital of Ivanovo Oblast) and 282 kilometres (175 mi) from Moscow. Taymanikha is the nearest rural locality.
