= Savkovo, Ivanovo Oblast =

Savkovo Савково
- Village
- Location within Ivanovo Oblast Location within Russia
- Coordinates: 57°07′N 41°50′E
- Country: Russia
- Region: Ivanovo Oblast
- District: Rodnikovsky District
- Time zone: UTC+3:00

Savkovo (Russian: Савково) is a rural locality (a village) in Rodnikovsky District, Ivanovo Oblast, Russia. Population: 36 (2010 census);

== Geography ==
This rural locality is located 7 kilometres (4.3 mi) from Rodniki (the district's administrative centre), 55 kilometres (34 mi) from Ivanovo (capital of Ivanovo Oblast) and 297 kilometres (185 mi) from Moscow. Novinskoye is the nearest rural locality.
