= Kutilovo, Ivanovo Oblast =

Kutilovo Кутилово
- Village
- Location within Ivanovo Oblast Location within Russia
- Coordinates: 57°04′N 41°41′E
- Country: Russia
- Region: Ivanovo Oblast
- District: Rodnikovsky District
- Time zone: UTC+3:00

Kutilovo (Russian: Кутилово) is a rural locality (a village) in Rodnikovsky District, Ivanovo Oblast, Russia. Population: 16 (2010 census);

== Geography ==
This rural locality is located 5 kilometres (3.1 mi) from Rodniki (the district's administrative centre), 45 kilometres (28 mi) from Ivanovo (capital of Ivanovo Oblast) and 286 kilometres (178 mi) from Moscow. Kozloki is the nearest rural locality.
