= Sosnovets, Ivanovo Oblast =

Sosnovets Сосновец
- Village
- Location within Ivanovo Oblast Location within Russia
- Coordinates: 56°57′N 41°46′E
- Country: Russia
- Region: Ivanovo Oblast
- District: Rodnikovsky District
- Time zone: UTC+3:00

Sosnovets (Russian: Сосновец) is a rural locality (a selo) in Rodnikovsky District, Ivanovo Oblast, Russia. Population: 442 (2010 census);

== Geography ==
This rural locality is located 17 kilometres (11 mi) from Rodniki (the district's administrative centre), 49 kilometres (30 mi) from Ivanovo (capital of Ivanovo Oblast) and 285 kilometres (177 mi) from Moscow. Khmelniki is the nearest rural locality.
