= Krasnovo, Rodnikovsky District, Ivanovo Oblast =

Village in Ivanovo Oblast, Russia

Krasnovo Красново
- Village
- Location within Ivanovo Oblast Location within Russia
- Coordinates: 57°00′N 41°54′E
- Country: Russia
- Region: Ivanovo Oblast
- District: Rodnikovsky District
- Time zone: UTC+3:00

Krasnovo (Russian: Красново) is a rural locality (a village) in Rodnikovsky District, Ivanovo Oblast, Russia. It has a population of 29 (2010 census);

== Geography ==
This rural locality is located 16 kilometres (9.9 mi) from Rodniki (the district's administrative centre), 57 kilometres (35 mi) from Ivanovo (capital of Ivanovo Oblast) and 295 kilometres (183 mi) from Moscow. Lomy-Malye is the nearest rural locality.
