= Sitkovo, Ivanovo Oblast =

Sitkovo Ситьково
- Village
- Location within Ivanovo Oblast Location within Russia
- Coordinates: 57°05′N 41°25′E
- Country: Russia
- Region: Ivanovo Oblast
- District: Rodnikovsky District
- Time zone: UTC+3:00

Sitkovo (Russian: Ситьково) is a rural locality (a village) in Rodnikovsky District, Ivanovo Oblast, Russia. Population: 208 (2010 census);

== Geography ==
This rural locality is located 19 kilometres (12 mi) from Rodniki (the district's administrative centre), 29 kilometres (18 mi) from Ivanovo (capital of Ivanovo Oblast) and 273 kilometres (170 mi) from Moscow. Bobrokovo is the nearest rural locality.
