= Gordyakovka =

Gordyakovka Гордяковка
- Village
- Location within Ivanovo Oblast Location within Russia
- Coordinates: 57°07′N 41°47′E
- Country: Russia
- Region: Ivanovo Oblast
- District: Rodnikovsky District
- Time zone: UTC+3:00

Gordyakovka (Russian: Гордяковка) is a rural locality (a village) in Rodnikovsky District, Ivanovo Oblast, Russia. Population: 27 (2010 census);

== Geography ==
This rural locality is located 4 kilometres (2.5 mi) from Rodniki (the district's administrative centre), 52 kilometres (32 mi) from Ivanovo (capital of Ivanovo Oblast) and 295 kilometres (183 mi) from Moscow. Vershina is the nearest rural locality.
