= Orekhovo, Ivanovo Oblast =

Orekhovo Орехово
- Village
- Location within Ivanovo Oblast Location within Russia
- Coordinates: 57°04′N 41°56′E
- Country: Russia
- Region: Ivanovo Oblast
- District: Rodnikovsky District
- Time zone: UTC+3:00

Orekhovo (Russian: Орехово) is a rural locality (a village) in Rodnikovsky District, Ivanovo Oblast, Russia. Population: 13 (2010 census);

== Geography ==
This rural locality is located 13 kilometres (8.1 mi) from Rodniki (the district's administrative centre), 60 kilometres (37 mi) from Ivanovo (capital of Ivanovo Oblast) and 300 kilometres (190 mi) from Moscow. Kortsovo is the nearest rural locality.
