= Postninsky =

Postninsky Постнинский
- Village
- Location within Ivanovo Oblast Location within Russia
- Coordinates: 57°08′N 41°40′E
- Country: Russia
- Region: Ivanovo Oblast
- District: Rodnikovsky District
- Time zone: UTC+3:00

Postninsky (Russian: Постнинский) is a rural locality (a selo) in Rodnikovsky District, Ivanovo Oblast, Russia. Population: 516 (2010 census);

== Geography ==
This rural locality is located 5 kilometres (3.1 mi) from Rodniki (the district's administrative centre), 46 kilometres (29 mi) from Ivanovo (capital of Ivanovo Oblast) and 289 kilometres (180 mi) from Moscow. Fedyakovo is the nearest rural locality.
