= Mikhaylovskoye, Rodnikovsky District, Ivanovo Oblast =

Mikhaylovskoye Михайловское
- Village
- Location within Ivanovo Oblast Location within Russia
- Coordinates: 57°09′N 41°37′E
- Country: Russia
- Region: Ivanovo Oblast
- District: Rodnikovsky District
- Time zone: UTC+3:00

Mikhaylovskoye (Russian: Михайловское) is a rural locality (a selo) in Rodnikovsky District, Ivanovo Oblast, Russia. Population: 290 (2010 census);

== Geography ==
This rural locality is located 9 kilometres (5.6 mi) from Rodniki (the district's administrative centre), 44 kilometres (27 mi) from Ivanovo (capital of Ivanovo Oblast) and 288 kilometres (179 mi) from Moscow. Ushakovo is the nearest rural locality.
