= Shubino, Rodnikovsky District, Ivanovo Oblast =

Shubino Шубино
- Village
- Location within Ivanovo Oblast Location within Russia
- Coordinates: 57°10′N 41°27′E
- Country: Russia
- Region: Ivanovo Oblast
- District: Rodnikovsky District
- Time zone: UTC+3:00

Shubino (Russian: Шубино) is a rural locality (a village) in Rodnikovsky District, Ivanovo Oblast, Russia. Population: 61 (2010 census);

== Geography ==
This rural locality is located 18 kilometres (11 mi) from Rodniki (the district's administrative centre), 35 kilometres (22 mi) from Ivanovo (capital of Ivanovo Oblast) and 280 kilometres (170 mi) from Moscow. Kaminsky is the nearest rural locality.
