= Koyevo =

Village in Kursk Oblast, Russia

Koyevo Коево
- Village
- Location within Ivanovo Oblast Location within Russia
- Coordinates: 57°07′N 41°35′E
- Country: Russia
- Region: Ivanovo Oblast
- District: Rodnikovsky District
- Time zone: UTC+3:00

Koyevo (Russian: Коево) is a rural locality (a village) in Rodnikovsky District, Ivanovo Oblast, Russia. It has a population of 7 (2010 census);

== Geography ==
This rural locality is located 9 kilometres (5.6 mi) from Rodniki (the district's administrative centre), 41 kilometres (25 mi) from Ivanovo (capital of Ivanovo Oblast) and 284 kilometres (176 mi) from Moscow. Khripovo is the nearest rural locality.
