= Melechkino =

Melechkino Мелечкино
- Village
- Location within Ivanovo Oblast Location within Russia
- Coordinates: 57°01′N 41°50′E
- Country: Russia
- Region: Ivanovo Oblast
- District: Rodnikovsky District
- Time zone: UTC+3:00

Melechkino (Russian: Мелечкино) is a rural locality (a selo) in Rodnikovsky District, Ivanovo Oblast, Russia. Population: 102 (2010 census);

== Geography ==
This rural locality is located 11 kilometres (6.8 mi) from Rodniki (the district's administrative centre), 54 kilometres (34 mi) from Ivanovo (capital of Ivanovo Oblast) and 293 kilometres (182 mi) from Moscow. Prislonikha is the nearest rural locality.
