= Skrylovo =

Skrylovo Скрылово
- Village
- Location within Ivanovo Oblast Location within Russia
- Coordinates: 57°07′N 41°40′E
- Country: Russia
- Region: Ivanovo Oblast
- District: Rodnikovsky District
- Time zone: UTC+3:00

Skrylovo (Russian: Скрылово) is a rural locality (a village) in Rodnikovsky District, Ivanovo Oblast, Russia. Population: 166 (2010 census);

== Geography ==
This rural locality is located 4 kilometres (2.5 mi) from Rodniki (the district's administrative centre), 45 kilometres (28 mi) from Ivanovo (capital of Ivanovo Oblast) and 288 kilometres (179 mi) from Moscow. Postninsky is the nearest rural locality.
