= Bobrokovo =

Bobrokovo Боброково
- Village
- Location within Ivanovo Oblast Location within Russia
- Coordinates: 57°04′N 41°26′E
- Country: Russia
- Region: Ivanovo Oblast
- District: Rodnikovsky District
- Time zone: UTC+3:00

Bobrokovo (Russian: Боброково) is a rural locality (a village) in Rodnikovsky District, Ivanovo Oblast, Russia. Population: 17 (2010 census);

== Geography ==
This rural locality is located 18 kilometres (11 mi) from Rodniki (the district's administrative centre), 30 kilometres (19 mi) from Ivanovo (capital of Ivanovo Oblast) and 274 kilometres (170 mi) from Moscow. Sitkovo is the nearest rural locality.
