= Koshcheyevo, Rodnikovsky District, Ivanovo Oblast =

Village in Ivanovo Oblast, Russia

Koshcheyevo Кощеево
- Village
- Location within Ivanovo Oblast Location within Russia
- Coordinates: 57°09′N 41°31′E
- Country: Russia
- Region: Ivanovo Oblast
- District: Rodnikovsky District
- Time zone: UTC+3:00

Koshcheyevo (Russian: Кощеево) is a rural locality (a selo) in Rodnikovsky District, Ivanovo Oblast, Russia. Population: 5 (2010 census);

== Geography ==
This rural locality is located 14 kilometres (8.7 mi) from Rodniki (the district's administrative centre), 38 kilometres (24 mi) from Ivanovo (capital of Ivanovo Oblast) and 282 kilometres (175 mi) from Moscow. Kindyakovo is the nearest rural locality.
