= Malchikha, Rodnikovsky District, Ivanovo Oblast =

Malchikha Мальчиха
- Village
- Location within Ivanovo Oblast Location within Russia
- Coordinates: 57°09′N 41°48′E
- Country: Russia
- Region: Ivanovo Oblast
- District: Rodnikovsky District
- Time zone: UTC+3:00

Malchikha (Russian: Мальчиха) is a rural locality (a village) in Rodnikovsky District, Ivanovo Oblast, Russia. Population: 239 (2010 census);

== Geography ==
This rural locality is located 7 kilometres (4.3 mi) from Rodniki (the district's administrative centre), 54 kilometres (34 mi) from Ivanovo (capital of Ivanovo Oblast) and 296 kilometres (184 mi) from Moscow. Artemyevo is the nearest rural locality.
