= Petrovo, Rodnikovsky District, Ivanovo Oblast =

Petrovo Петрово
- Village
- Location within Ivanovo Oblast Location within Russia
- Coordinates: 56°59′N 41°42′E
- Country: Russia
- Region: Ivanovo Oblast
- District: Rodnikovsky District
- Time zone: UTC+3:00

Petrovo (Russian: Петрово) is a rural locality (a village) in Rodnikovsky District, Ivanovo Oblast, Russia. Population: 12 (2010 census);

== Geography ==
This rural locality is located 13 kilometres (8.1 mi) from Rodniki (the district's administrative centre), 44 kilometres (27 mi) from Ivanovo (capital of Ivanovo Oblast) and 283 kilometres (176 mi) from Moscow. Parskoye is the nearest rural locality.
