= Melikha =

Melikha Мелиха
- Village
- Location within Ivanovo Oblast Location within Russia
- Coordinates: 57°08′N 41°30′E
- Country: Russia
- Region: Ivanovo Oblast
- District: Rodnikovsky District
- Time zone: UTC+3:00

Melikha (Russian: Мелиха) is a rural locality (a village) in Rodnikovsky District, Ivanovo Oblast, Russia. Population: 9 (2010 census);

== Geography ==
This rural locality is located 14 kilometres (8.7 mi) from Rodniki (the district's administrative centre), 36 kilometres (22 mi) from Ivanovo (capital of Ivanovo Oblast) and 280 kilometres (170 mi) from Moscow. Shiryaikha-Bolshaya is the nearest rural locality.
