= Demenovo =

Demenovo Деменово
- Village
- Location within Ivanovo Oblast Location within Russia
- Coordinates: 57°02′N 41°32′E
- Country: Russia
- Region: Ivanovo Oblast
- District: Rodnikovsky District
- Time zone: UTC+3:00

Demenovo (Russian: Деменово) is a rural locality (a village) in Rodnikovsky District, Ivanovo Oblast, Russia. Population: 20 (2010 census);

== Geography ==
This rural locality is located 13 kilometres (8.1 mi) from Rodniki (the district's administrative centre), 36 kilometres (22 mi) from Ivanovo (capital of Ivanovo Oblast) and 277 kilometres (172 mi) from Moscow. Berdyukovo is the nearest rural locality.
