= Kudelino, Rodnikovsky District, Ivanovo Oblast =

Kudelino Куделино
- Village
- Location within Ivanovo Oblast Location within Russia
- Coordinates: 57°03′N 41°57′E
- Country: Russia
- Region: Ivanovo Oblast
- District: Rodnikovsky District
- Time zone: UTC+3:00

Kudelino (Russian: Куделино) is a rural locality (a village) in Rodnikovsky District, Ivanovo Oblast, Russia. Population: 185 (2010 census);

== Geography ==
This rural locality is located 15 kilometres (9.3 mi) from Rodniki (the district's administrative centre), 61 kilometres (38 mi) from Ivanovo (capital of Ivanovo Oblast) and 300 kilometres (190 mi) from Moscow. Proniskino is the nearest rural locality.
