= Khlyabovo =

Khlyabovo Хлябово
- Village
- Location within Ivanovo Oblast Location within Russia
- Coordinates: 57°01′N 42°02′E
- Country: Russia
- Region: Ivanovo Oblast
- District: Rodnikovsky District
- Time zone: UTC+3:00

Khlyabovo (Russian: Хлябово) is a rural locality (a selo) in Rodnikovsky District, Ivanovo Oblast, Russia. Population: 27 (2010 census);

== Geography ==
This rural locality is located 20 kilometres (12 mi) from Rodniki (the district's administrative centre), 65 kilometres (40 mi) from Ivanovo (capital of Ivanovo Oblast) and 302 kilometres (188 mi) from Moscow. Zakharovo is the nearest rural locality.
