= Klintsevo, Rodnikovsky District, Ivanovo Oblast =

Klintsevo Клинцево
- Village
- Location within Ivanovo Oblast Location within Russia
- Coordinates: 57°10′N 41°38′E
- Country: Russia
- Region: Ivanovo Oblast
- District: Rodnikovsky District
- Time zone: UTC+3:00

Klintsevo (Russian: Клинцево) is a rural locality (a village) in Rodnikovsky District, Ivanovo Oblast, Russia. Population: 10 (2010 census);

== Geography ==
This rural locality is located 9 kilometres (5.6 mi) from Rodniki (the district's administrative centre), 46 kilometres (29 mi) from Ivanovo (capital of Ivanovo Oblast) and 290 kilometres (180 mi) from Moscow. Bukovo is the nearest rural locality.
