= Ganino, Rodnikovsky District, Ivanovo Oblast =

Ganino Ганино
- Village
- Location within Ivanovo Oblast Location within Russia
- Coordinates: 57°06′N 41°53′E
- Country: Russia
- Region: Ivanovo Oblast
- District: Rodnikovsky District
- Time zone: UTC+3:00

Ganino (Russian: Ганино) is a rural locality (a village) in Rodnikovsky District, Ivanovo Oblast, Russia. Population: 5 (2010 census);

== Geography ==
This rural locality is located 10 kilometres (6.2 mi) from Rodniki (the district's administrative centre), 58 kilometres (36 mi) from Ivanovo (capital of Ivanovo Oblast) and 299 kilometres (186 mi) from Moscow. Bukharino is the nearest rural locality.
