= Taymanikha =

Taymanikha Тайманиха
- Village
- Location within Ivanovo Oblast Location within Russia
- Coordinates: 57°07′N 41°32′E
- Country: Russia
- Region: Ivanovo Oblast
- District: Rodnikovsky District
- Time zone: UTC+3:00

Taymanikha (Russian: Тайманиха) is a rural locality (a village) in Rodnikovsky District, Ivanovo Oblast, Russia. Population: 305 (2010 census);

== Geography ==
This rural locality is located 12 kilometres (7.5 mi) from Rodniki (the district's administrative centre), 38 kilometres (24 mi) from Ivanovo (capital of Ivanovo Oblast) and 281 kilometres (175 mi) from Moscow. Mostishchi is the nearest rural locality.
