= Berdyukovo =

Berdyukovo Бердюково
- Village
- Location within Ivanovo Oblast Location within Russia
- Coordinates: 57°02′N 41°33′E
- Country: Russia
- Region: Ivanovo Oblast
- District: Rodnikovsky District
- Time zone: UTC+3:00

Berdyukovo (Russian: Бердюково) is a rural locality (a village) in Rodnikovsky District, Ivanovo Oblast, Russia. Population: 17 (2010 census);

== Geography ==
This rural locality is located 13 kilometres (8.1 mi) from Rodniki (the district's administrative centre), 36 kilometres (22 mi) from Ivanovo (capital of Ivanovo Oblast) and 278 kilometres (173 mi) from Moscow. Demenevo is the nearest rural locality.
