= Shiryaikha Bolshaya =

Shiryaikha Bolshaya Ширяиха Большая
- Village
- Location within Ivanovo Oblast Location within Russia
- Coordinates: 57°07′N 41°31′E
- Country: Russia
- Region: Ivanovo Oblast
- District: Rodnikovsky District
- Time zone: UTC+3:00

Shiryaikha Bolshaya (Russian: Ширяиха Большая) is a rural locality (a village) in Rodnikovsky District, Ivanovo Oblast, Russia. Population: 13 (2010 census);

== Geography ==
This rural locality is located 13 kilometres (8.1 mi) from Rodniki (the district's administrative centre), 36 kilometres (22 mi) from Ivanovo (capital of Ivanovo Oblast) and 280 kilometres (170 mi) from Moscow. Zakharikha is the nearest rural locality.
