= Filisovo, Rodnikovsky District, Ivanovo Oblast =

Filisovo Филисово
- Village
- Location within Ivanovo Oblast Location within Russia
- Coordinates: 57°05′N 41°56′E
- Country: Russia
- Region: Ivanovo Oblast
- District: Rodnikovsky District
- Time zone: UTC+3:00

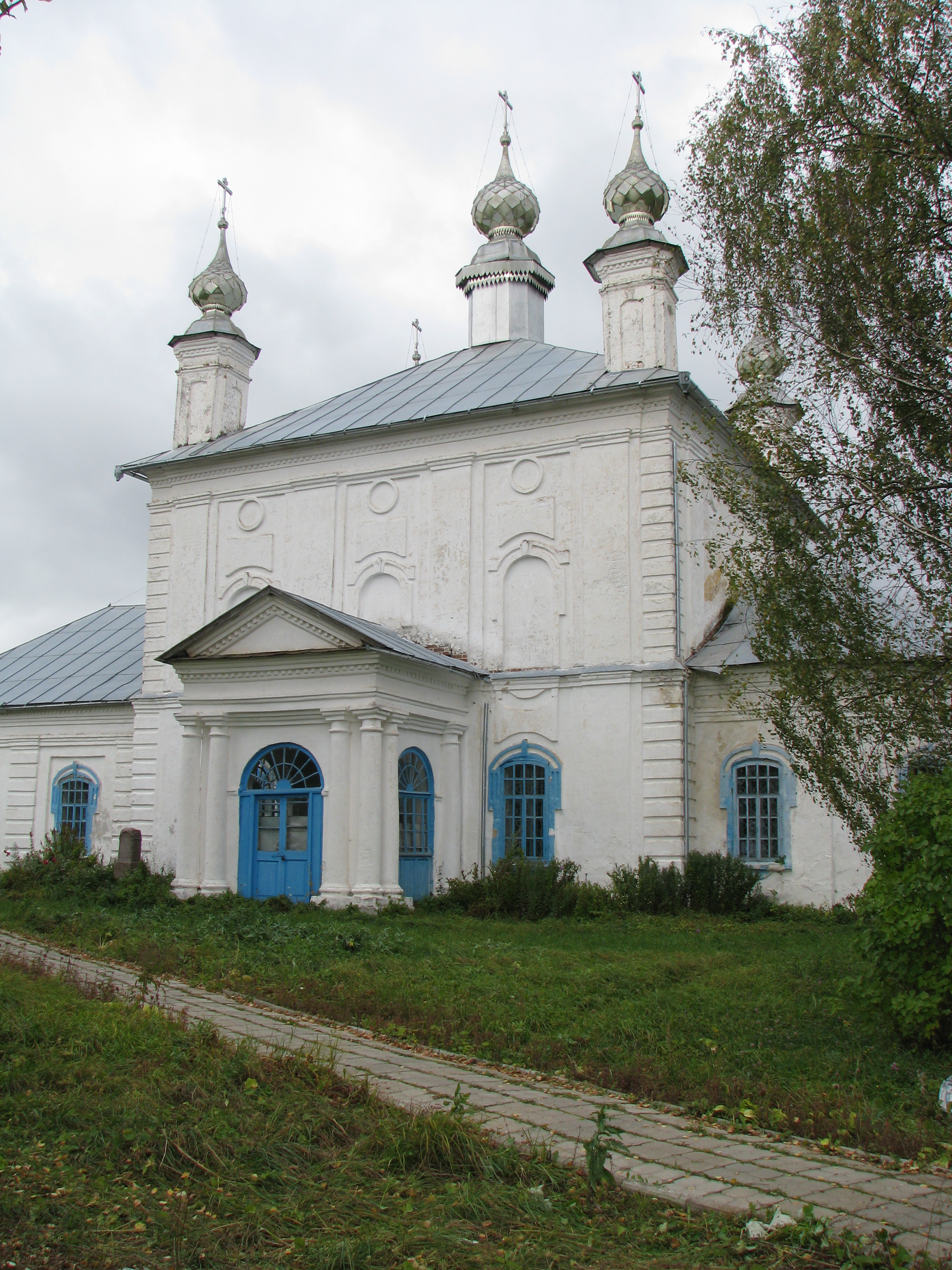
Vvedenskaya Church in Filisovo, Rodnikovsky District, Ivanovo Region

Filisovo (Russian: Филисово) is a rural locality (a selo) in Rodnikovsky District, Ivanovo Oblast, Russia. Population: 538 (2010 census);

== Geography ==
This rural locality is located 13 kilometres (8.1 mi) from Rodniki (the district's administrative centre), 60 kilometres (37 mi) from Ivanovo (capital of Ivanovo Oblast) and 301 kilometres (187 mi) from Moscow. Slobodka is the nearest rural locality.
