= Parakhino, Ivanovo Oblast =

Parakhino Парахино
- Village
- Location within Ivanovo Oblast Location within Russia
- Coordinates: 56°58′N 41°46′E
- Country: Russia
- Region: Ivanovo Oblast
- District: Rodnikovsky District
- Time zone: UTC+3:00

Parakhino (Russian: Парахино) is a rural locality (a village) in Rodnikovsky District, Ivanovo Oblast, Russia. Population: 63 (2010 census);

== Geography ==
This rural locality is located 16 kilometres (9.9 mi) from Rodniki (the district's administrative centre), 49 kilometres (30 mi) from Ivanovo (capital of Ivanovo Oblast) and 286 kilometres (178 mi) from Moscow. Tyurikha is the nearest rural locality.
