= Tatyanikha, Rodnikovsky District, Ivanovo Oblast =

Tatyanikha Татьяниха
- Village
- Location within Ivanovo Oblast Location within Russia
- Coordinates: 57°12′N 41°39′E
- Country: Russia
- Region: Ivanovo Oblast
- District: Rodnikovsky District
- Time zone: UTC+3:00

Tatyanikha (Russian: Татьяниха) is a rural locality (a village) in Rodnikovsky District, Ivanovo Oblast, Russia. Population: 26 (2010 census);

== Geography ==
This rural locality is located 11 kilometres (6.8 mi) from Rodniki (the district's administrative centre), 48 kilometres (30 mi) from Ivanovo (capital of Ivanovo Oblast) and 292 kilometres (181 mi) from Moscow. Krasnoye is the nearest rural locality.
