= Prislonikha, Rodnikovsky District, Ivanovo Oblast =

Prislonikha Прислониха
- Village
- Location within Ivanovo Oblast Location within Russia
- Coordinates: 57°01′N 41°49′E
- Country: Russia
- Region: Ivanovo Oblast
- District: Rodnikovsky District
- Time zone: UTC+3:00

Prislonikha (Russian: Прислониха) is a rural locality (a village) in Rodnikovsky District, Ivanovo Oblast, Russia. Population: 5 (2010 census);

== Geography ==
This rural locality is located 10 kilometres (6.2 mi) from Rodniki (the district's administrative centre), 52 kilometres (32 mi) from Ivanovo (capital of Ivanovo Oblast) and 291 kilometres (181 mi) from Moscow. Melechkino is the nearest rural locality.
