= Tezinka =

Tezinka Тезинка
- Village
- Location within Ivanovo Oblast Location within Russia
- Coordinates: 57°08′N 41°29′E
- Country: Russia
- Region: Ivanovo Oblast
- District: Rodnikovsky District
- Time zone: UTC+3:00

Tezinka (Russian: Тезинка) is a rural locality (a village) in Rodnikovsky District, Ivanovo Oblast, Russia. Population: 21 (2010 census);

== Geography ==
This rural locality is located 16 kilometres (9.9 mi) from Rodniki (the district's administrative centre), 36 kilometres (22 mi) from Ivanovo (capital of Ivanovo Oblast) and 280 kilometres (170 mi) from Moscow. Kaminsky is the nearest rural locality.
