= Bukovo, Ivanovo Oblast =

Bukovo Буково
- Village
- Location within Ivanovo Oblast Location within Russia
- Coordinates: 57°11′N 41°38′E
- Country: Russia
- Region: Ivanovo Oblast
- District: Rodnikovsky District
- Time zone: UTC+3:00

Bukovo (Russian: Буково) is a rural locality (a village) in Rodnikovsky District, Ivanovo Oblast, Russia. Population: 6 (2010 census);

== Geography ==
This rural locality is located 10 kilometres (6.2 mi) from Rodniki (the district's administrative centre), 46 kilometres (29 mi) from Ivanovo (capital of Ivanovo Oblast) and 290 kilometres (180 mi) from Moscow. Klintsevo is the nearest rural locality.
