= Derevenki, Rodnikovsky District, Ivanovo Oblast =

Derevenki Деревеньки
- Village
- Location within Ivanovo Oblast Location within Russia
- Coordinates: 57°05′N 41°39′E
- Country: Russia
- Region: Ivanovo Oblast
- District: Rodnikovsky District
- Time zone: UTC+3:00

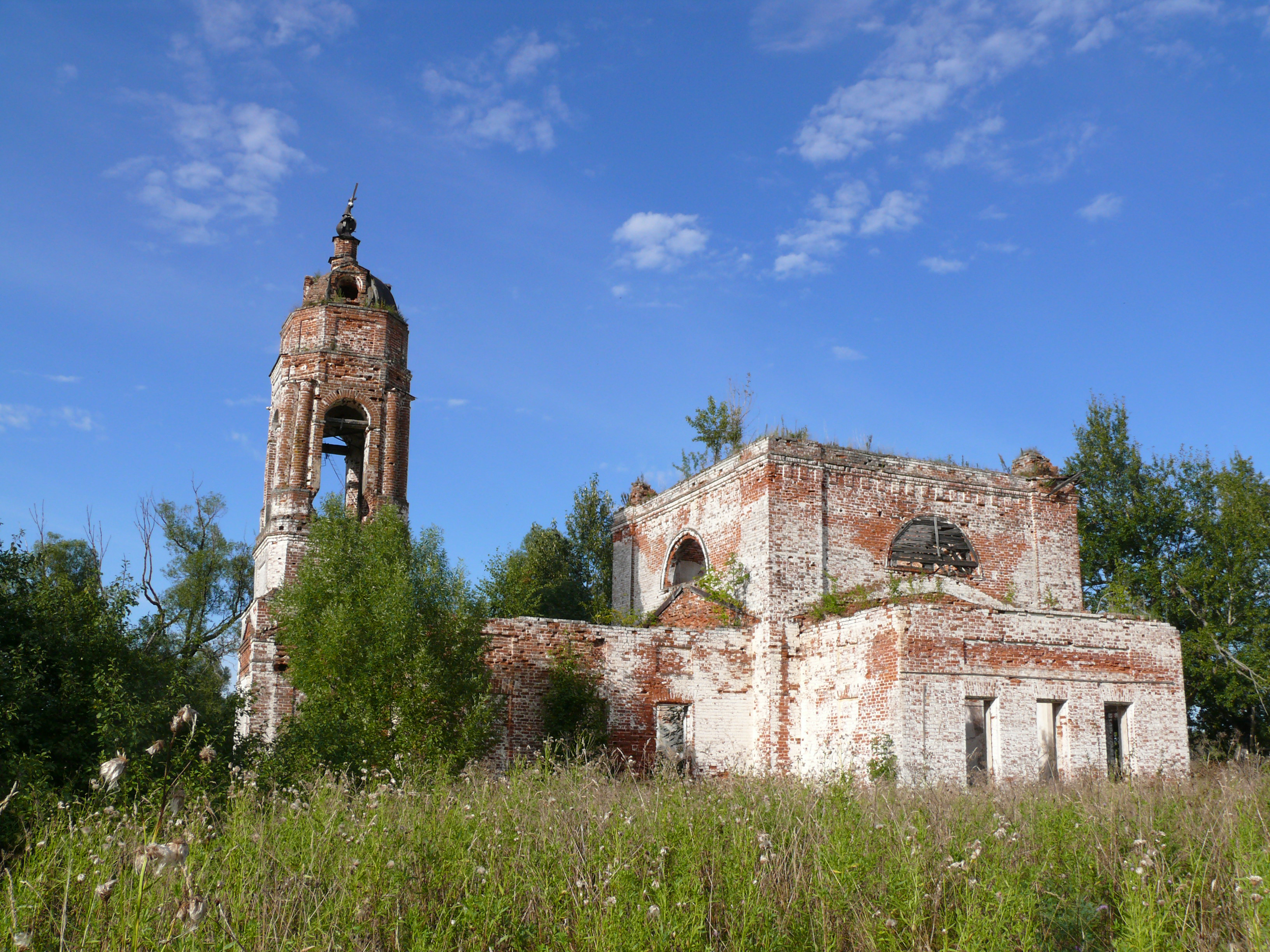
St. Nicholas Church in Derevenki

Derevenki (Russian: Деревеньки) is a rural locality (a selo) in Rodnikovsky District, Ivanovo Oblast, Russia. Population: 99 (2010 census);

== Geography ==
This rural locality is located 5 kilometres (3.1 mi) from Rodniki (the district's administrative centre), 43 kilometres (27 mi) from Ivanovo (capital of Ivanovo Oblast) and 286 kilometres (178 mi) from Moscow. Akhidovka is the nearest rural locality.
