= Nikonikha =

Nikonikha Никониха
- Village
- Location within Ivanovo Oblast Location within Russia
- Coordinates: 56°59′N 41°49′E
- Country: Russia
- Region: Ivanovo Oblast
- District: Rodnikovsky District
- Time zone: UTC+3:00

Nikonikha (Russian: Никониха) is a rural locality (a village) in Rodnikovsky District, Ivanovo Oblast, Russia. Population: 47 (2010 census);

== Geography ==
This rural locality is located 13 kilometres (8.1 mi) from Rodniki (the district's administrative centre), 52 kilometres (32 mi) from Ivanovo (capital of Ivanovo Oblast) and 289 kilometres (180 mi) from Moscow. Kuzmino is the nearest rural locality.
