= Sennikovo =

Sennikovo Сенниково
- Village
- Location within Ivanovo Oblast Location within Russia
- Coordinates: 57°03′N 41°29′E
- Country: Russia
- Region: Ivanovo Oblast
- District: Rodnikovsky District
- Time zone: UTC+3:00

Sennikovo (Russian: Сенниково) is a rural locality (a selo) in Rodnikovsky District, Ivanovo Oblast, Russia. Population: 24 (2010 census);

== Geography ==
This rural locality is located 16 kilometres (9.9 mi) from Rodniki (the district's administrative centre), 32 kilometres (20 mi) from Ivanovo (capital of Ivanovo Oblast) and 275 kilometres (171 mi) from Moscow. Nikulskoye is the nearest rural locality.
