= Varvarikha =

Varvarikha Варвариха
- Village
- Location within Ivanovo Oblast Location within Russia
- Coordinates: 57°10′N 41°32′E
- Country: Russia
- Region: Ivanovo Oblast
- District: Rodnikovsky District
- Time zone: UTC+3:00

Varvarikha (Russian: Варвариха) is a rural locality (a village) in Rodnikovsky District, Ivanovo Oblast, Russia. Population: 7 (2010 census);

== Geography ==
This rural locality is located 13 kilometres (8.1 mi) from Rodniki (the district's administrative centre), 40 kilometres (25 mi) from Ivanovo (capital of Ivanovo Oblast) and 284 kilometres (176 mi) from Moscow. Mokeyevo is the nearest rural locality.
