= Bulatnikovo =

Bulatnikovo Булатниково
- Selo
- Location within Vladimir Oblast Location within Russia
- Coordinates: 55°41′N 41°45′E
- Country: Russia
- Region: Vladimir Oblast
- District: Muromsky District
- Time zone: UTC+3:00

Bulatnikovo (Russian: Була́тниково) is a rural locality (a selo) in Kovarditskoye Rural Settlement, Muromsky District, Vladimir Oblast, Russia. The population was 705 as of 2010. There are 7 streets.

== Geography ==
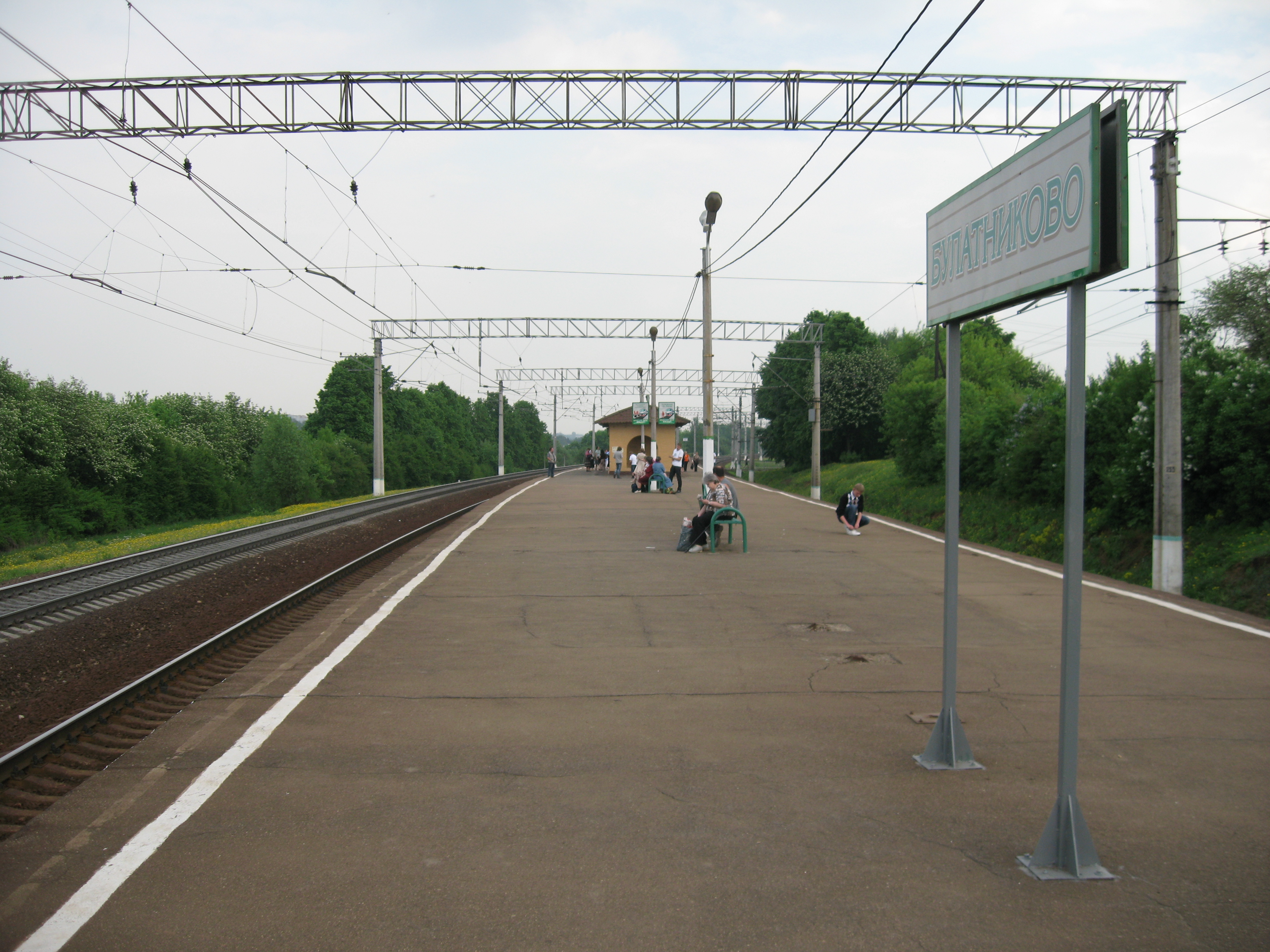
Bulatnikovo train platform, 2010.

Bulatnikovo is located 23 km northwest of Murom (the district's administrative centre) by road. The locality is served by a train platform. Fedorkovo is the nearest rural locality.
