= Molchna =

River in Ivanovo, Russia

- Native name: Молчна (Russian)

Physical characteristics
- Source
  - coordinates: 57.2159°N 41.7974°E
- Mouth: Postna
  - coordinates: 57.1452°N 41.6596°E
- Length: 20 km (12 mi)
- Basin size: 55.1 km^{2} (21.3 mi^{2})

Molchna is a river in the Rodnikovsky and Vichugsky regions of Ivanovo, Russia. The mouth of the river is 17 km along the right bank of the Postna River. The length of the river is 20 km, the catchment area is 55.1 km².
