= Fedorkovo, Gryazovetsky District, Vologda Oblast =

Fedorkovo Федорково
- Village
- Location within Vologda Oblast Location within Russia
- Coordinates: 59°02′N 40°16′E
- Country: Russia
- Region: Vologda Oblast
- District: Gryazovetsky District
- Time zone: UTC+3:00

Fedorkovo (Russian: Федорково) is a rural locality (a village) in Komyanovskoye Rural Settlement, Gryazovetsky District, Vologda Oblast, Russia. The population was 2 as of 2002.

== Geography ==
Fedorkovo is located 23 km (14 mi) north of Gryazovets (the district's administrative centre) by road. Maloye Kostino is the nearest rural locality.
