= Fedorkovo, Cherepovetsky District, Vologda Oblast =

Fedorkovo Федорково
- Village
- Location within Vologda Oblast Location within Russia
- Coordinates: 59°17′N 38°12′E
- Country: Russia
- Region: Vologda Oblast
- District: Cherepovetsky District
- Time zone: UTC+3:00

Fedorkovo (Russian: Федорково) is a rural locality (a village) in Yaganovskoye Rural Settlement, Cherepovetsky District, Vologda Oblast, Russia. The population was 13 as of 2002 census

== Geography ==
Fedorkovo is located 34 km (21 mi) northeast of Cherepovets (the district's administrative centre) by road. Beketovo is the nearest rural locality.
