= Fedorkovo, Vyaznikovsky District, Vladimir Oblast =

Fedorkovo Федорково
- Village
- Location within Vladimir Oblast Location within Russia
- Coordinates: 56°18′N 42°12′E
- Country: Russia
- Region: Vladimir Oblast
- District: Vyaznikovsky District
- Time zone: UTC+3:00

Fedorkovo (Russian: Федорково) is a rural locality (a village) in Gorod Vyazniki, Vyaznikovsky District, Vladimir Oblast, Russia. The population was 3 as of 2010.

== Geography ==
Fedorkovo is located on the Istok River, 8 km north of Vyazniki (the district's administrative centre) by road. Artemkovo is the nearest rural locality.
