= Fedorkovo, Gorokhovetsky District, Vladimir Oblast =

Fedorkovo Федорково
- Village
- Location within Vladimir Oblast Location within Russia
- Coordinates: 56°03′N 42°14′E
- Country: Russia
- Region: Vladimir Oblast
- District: Gorokhovetsky District
- Time zone: UTC+3:00

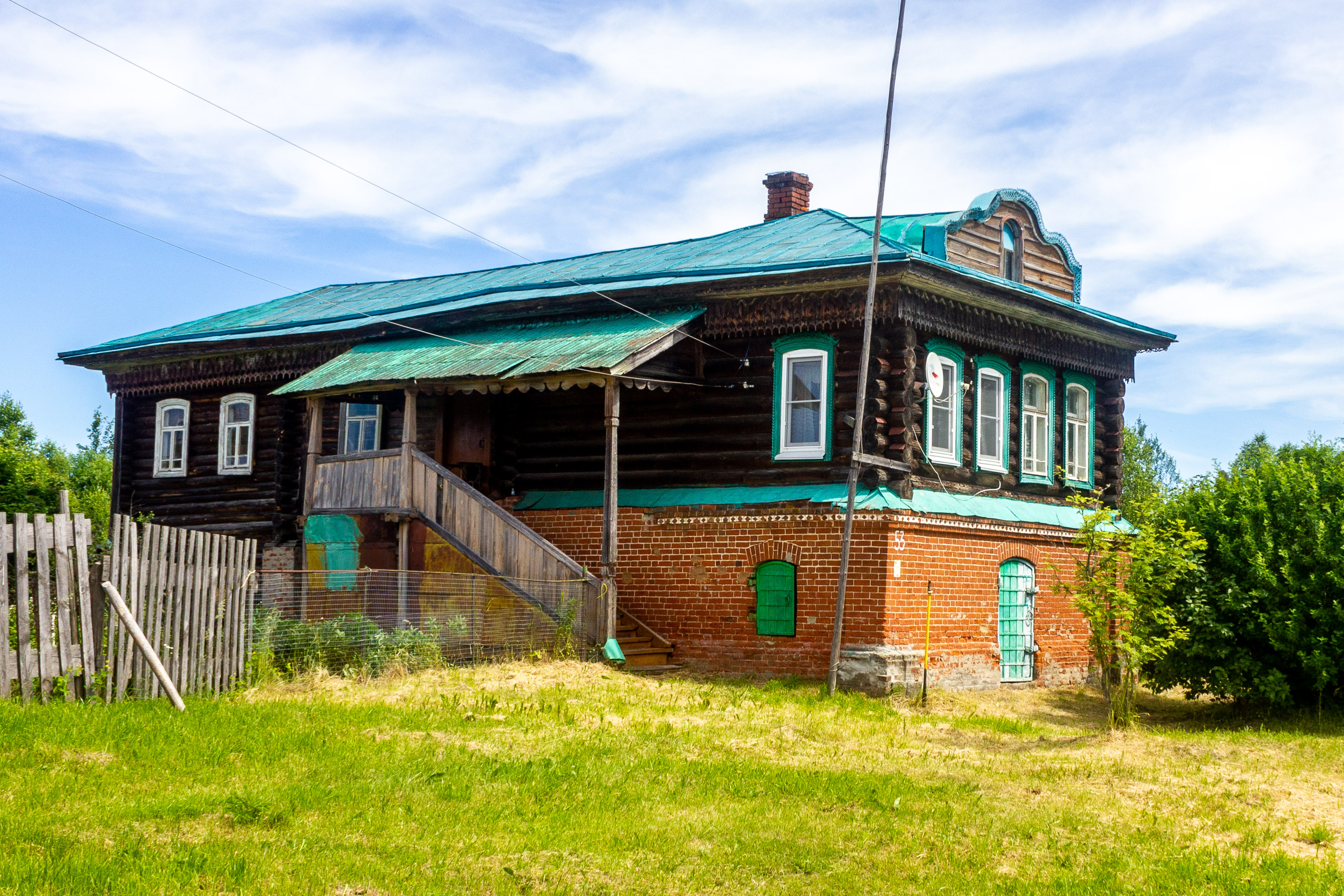
Residential building, Fedorkovo

Fedorkovo (Russian: Федорково) is a rural locality (a village) in Fominskoye Rural Settlement, Gorokhovetsky District, Vladimir Oblast, Russia. The population was 72 as of 2010.

== Geography ==
Fedorkovo is located on the Suvoroshch River, 49 km southwest of Gorokhovets (the district's administrative centre) by road. Myasnikovo is the nearest rural locality.
