= Fedorkovo, Muromsky District, Vladimir Oblast =

Fedorkovo Федорково
- Village
- Location within Vladimir Oblast Location within Russia
- Coordinates: 55°42′N 41°43′E
- Country: Russia
- Region: Vladimir Oblast
- District: Muromsky District
- Time zone: UTC+3:00

Fedorkovo (Russian: Федорково) is a rural locality (a village) in Kovarditskoye Rural Settlement, Muromsky District, Vladimir Oblast, Russia. The population was 4 as of 2010.

== Geography ==
Fedorkovo is located 28 km northwest of Murom (the district's administrative centre) by road. Savino is the nearest rural locality.
