= Rodniki, Ivanovo Oblast =

Town in Ivanovo Oblast, Russia

Rodniki Родники
- Town
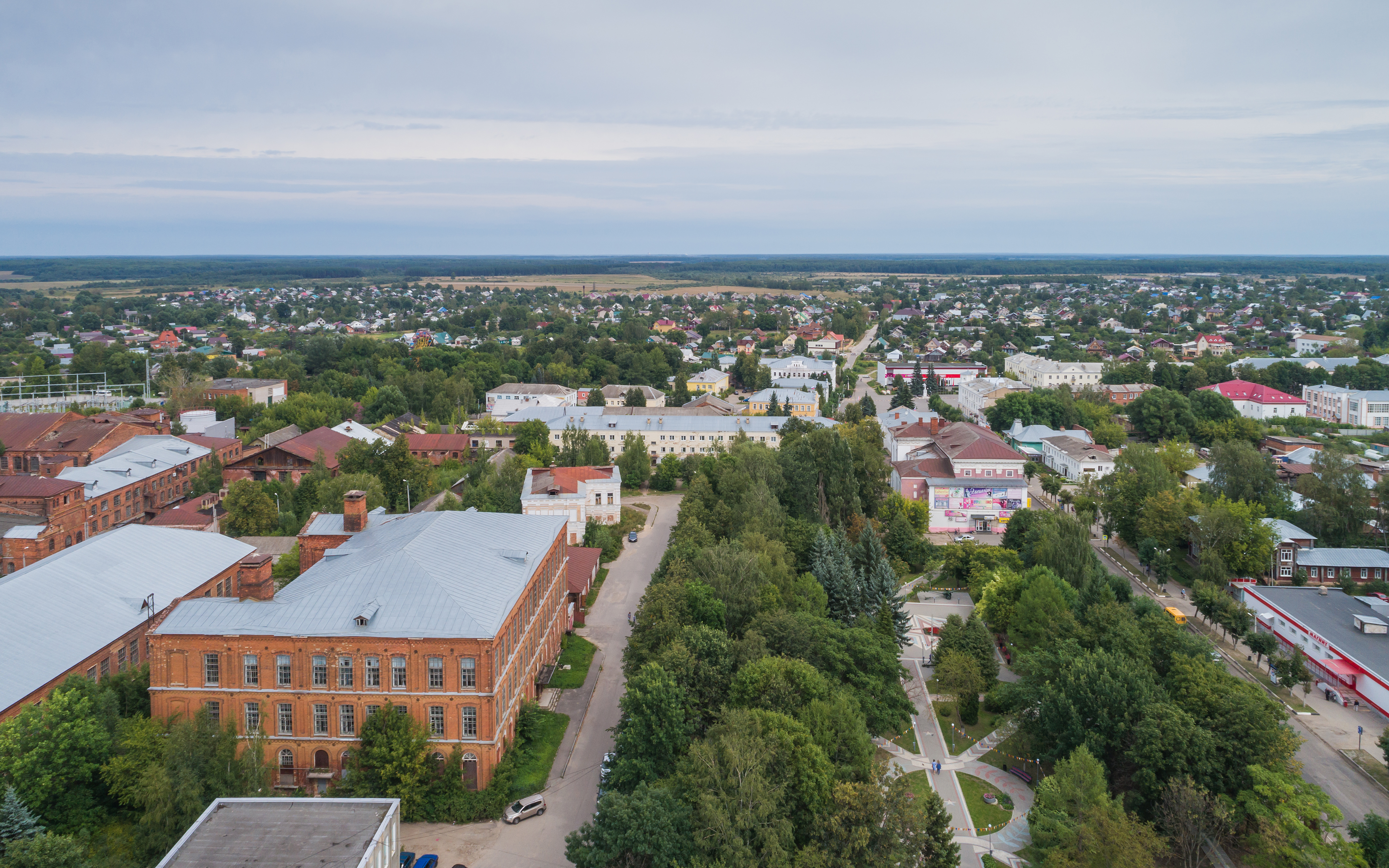
- Interactive map of Rodniki
- Location of Rodniki Rodniki (Ivanovo Oblast)
- Coordinates: 57°07′N 41°44′E
- Country: Russia
- Federal subject: Ivanovo Oblast
- Administrative district: Rodnikovsky District
- Known since: 1606
- Town status since: 1918
- Elevation: 140 m (460 ft)

Population (2010 Census)
  - Total: 26,310
  - Estimate (2021): 24,101 (−8.4%)

Administrative status
  - Capital of: Rodnikovsky District

Municipal status
  - Municipal district: Rodnikovsky Municipal District
  - Urban settlement: Rodnikovskoye Urban Settlement
  - Capital of: Rodnikovsky Municipal District, Rodnikovskoye Urban Settlement
- Time zone: UTC+3 (MSK)
- Postal code: 155250–155252
- OKTMO ID: 24623101001

Rodniki (Russian: Родники́, lit. springs) is a town and the administrative center of Rodnikovsky District in Ivanovo Oblast, Russia, located on the Yuksha River, 54 kilometers (34 mi) northeast of Ivanovo, the administrative center of the oblast. Population: 24,101 (2021 census); 26,310 (2010 census); 28,447 (2002 census); 32,088 (1989 Soviet census).

== History ==
It has been known since 1606 and was granted town status in 1918.

== Administrative and municipal status ==
Within the framework of administrative divisions, Rodniki serves as the administrative center of Rodnikovsky District, to which it is directly subordinated. Prior to the adoption of the Law #145-OZ On the Administrative-Territorial Division of Ivanovo Oblast in December 2010, it used to be incorporated separately as an administrative unit with the status equal to that of the districts.

As a municipal division, the town of Rodniki is incorporated within Rodnikovsky Municipal District as Rodnikovskoye Urban Settlement.

== Miscellaneous ==
Near Rodniki, at 57°05′24″N 41°44′02″E, there is a 350-meter (1,150 ft) tall guyed TV-mast built in 1977, which is one of the tallest of its kind in Russia.
