= Rodnikovsky District =

Rodnikovsky District Родниковский район (Russian)
- District
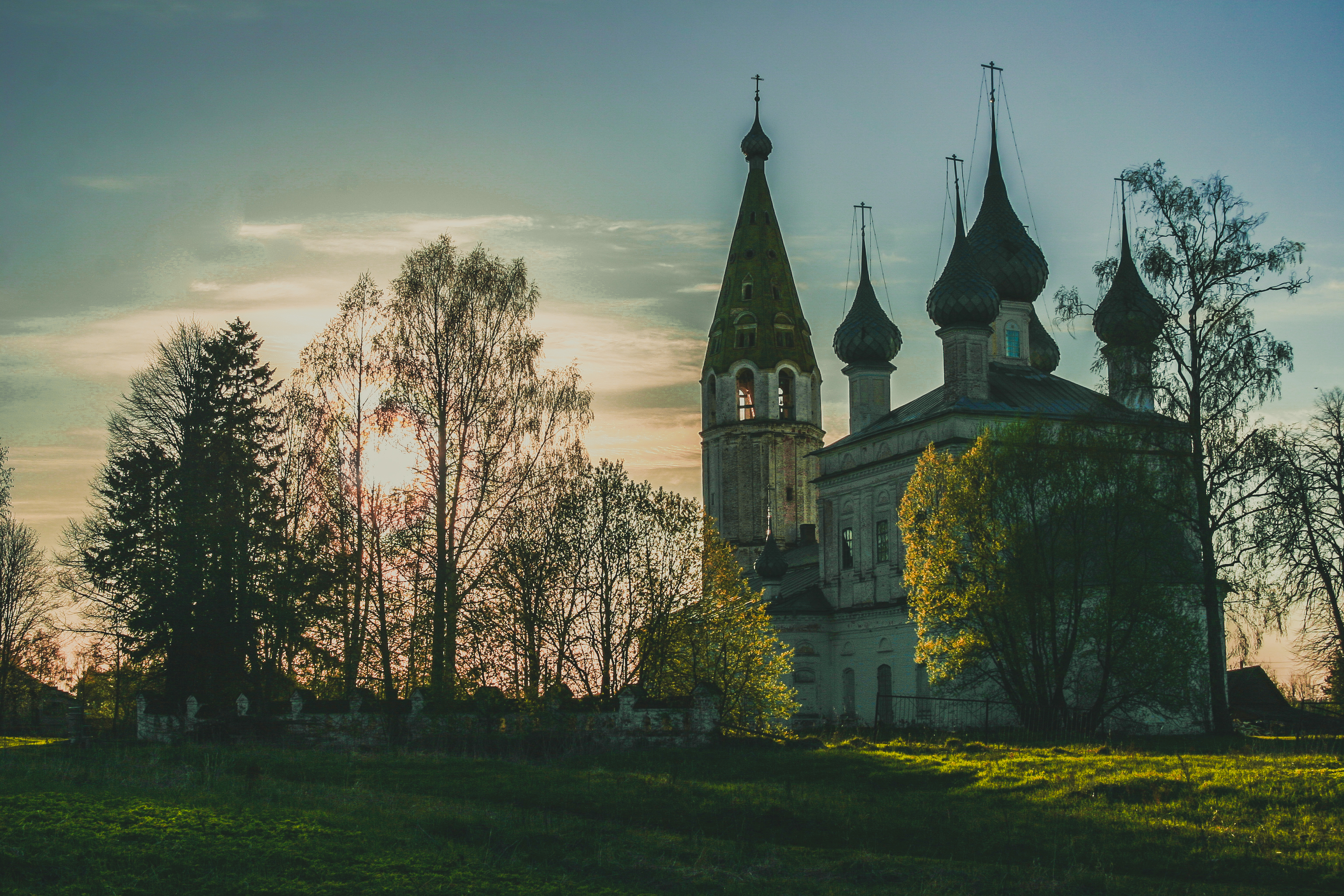
- Kazan church, built 1811, Rodnikovsky District

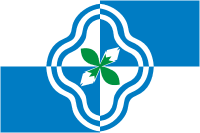
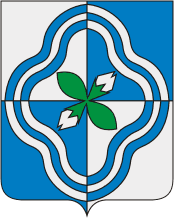
- Flag Coat of arms
- Location of Rodnikovsky District in Ivanovo Oblast
- Coordinates: 57°06′N 41°44′E
- Country: Russia
- Federal subject: Ivanovo Oblast
- Administrative center: Rodniki

Area
  - Total: 934 km^{2} (361 sq mi)

Population (2010 Census)
  - Total: 35,846
  - Density: 38.4/km^{2} (99.4/sq mi)
  - Urban: 73.4%
  - Rural: 26.6%

Administrative structure
  - Inhabited localities: 1 cities/towns, 156 rural localities

Municipal structure
  - Municipally incorporated as: Rodnikovsky Municipal District
  - Municipal divisions: 1 urban settlements, 3 rural settlements
- Time zone: UTC+3 (MSK)
- OKTMO ID: 24623000
- Website: https://www.rodniki-37.ru/

Rodnikovsky District (Russian: Роднико́вский райо́н) is an administrative and municipal district (raion), one of the twenty-one in Ivanovo Oblast, Russia. It is located in the center of the oblast. The area of the district is 934 square kilometers (361 sq mi). Its administrative center is the town of Rodniki. Population: 30,535 (2021 census); 35,846 (2010 census); 38,667 (2002 Census); 44,807 (1989 Soviet census). The population of Rodniki accounts for 78.9% of the district's total population.

== Administrative and municipal status ==
The town of Rodniki serves as the administrative center of the district. Prior to the adoption of the Law #145-OZ On the Administrative-Territorial Division of Ivanovo Oblast in December 2010, it was administratively incorporated separately from the district. Municipally, Rodniki is incorporated within Rodnikovsky Municipal District as Rodnikovskoye Urban Settlement.
