= Saint-Petersburg Society of Mutual Credit =

Former Russian bank

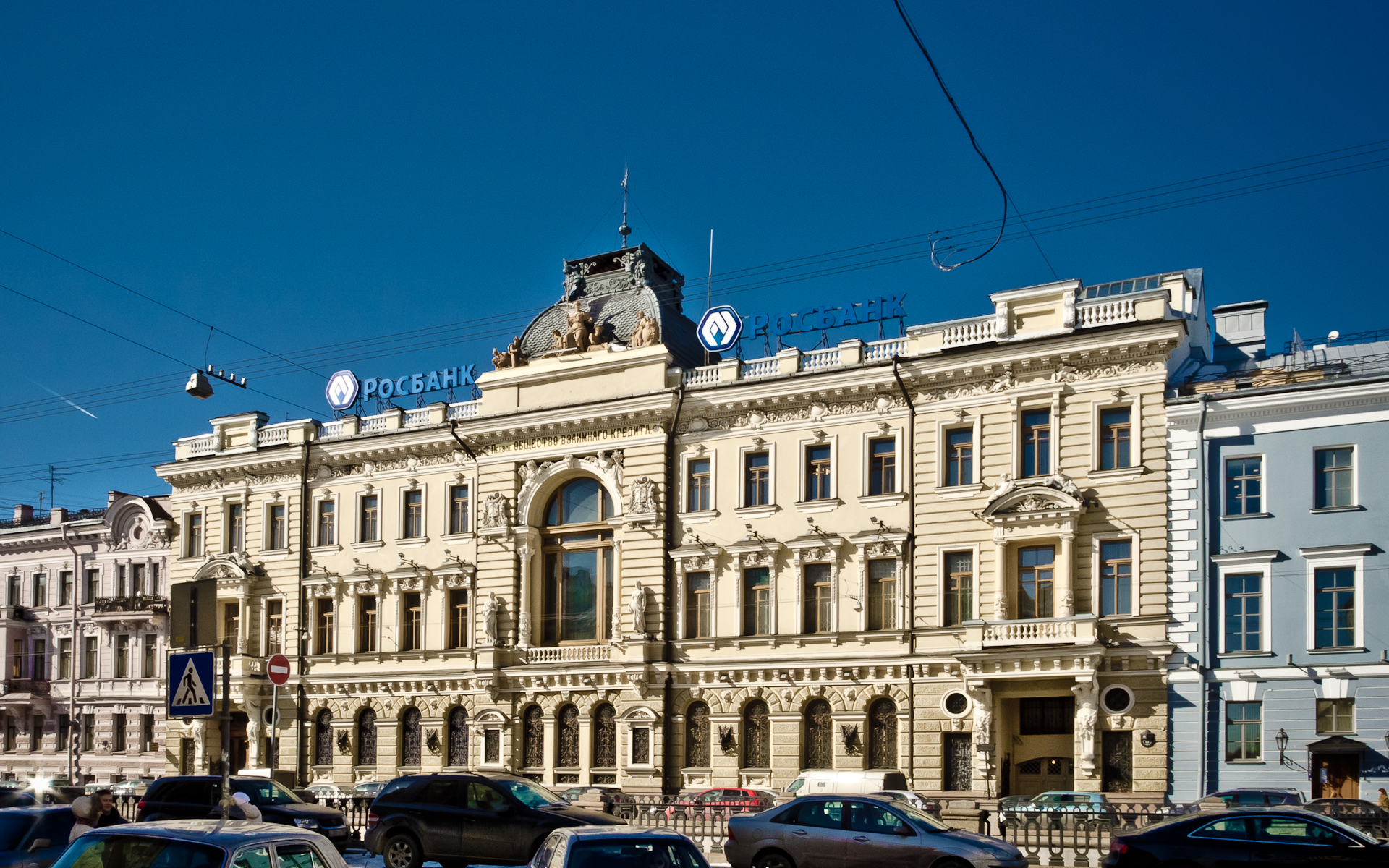
- 1st Saint-Petersburg Society of Mutual credit, 13 Griboyedov embankment.
- Native name: Санкт-Петербургское Общество взаимного кредита
- Company type: Public stock company
- Industry: Banking
- Founded: 9 April 1863
- Founder: Evgeny Lamansky
- Defunct: October 1918
- Fate: Dissolved by the Soviet regime
- Headquarters: Saint-Petersburg, Russian Empire
- Key people: Evgeny Lamansky
- Services: Loans, assets deposits

Saint-Petersburg Society of Mutual Credit (Russian: Санкт-Петербургское Общество взаимного кредита) was a Russian bank that operated between 1864 and 1918. The bank was the first commercial credit bank in Russia focused on providing credit to business and tangible assets deposits. The bank was founded in April 1863 by Evgeny Lamansky, then a vice-president of the State Bank of the Russian Empire.

== History ==
A massive fire that took place in Petersburg in 1862, when many city residents and traders, lost their properties, made Evgeny Lamanski pay attention to the Western system of bank crediting of small business. He suggested to the then minister of financies Count Michael von Reutern the project of a society of mutual credit. The idea had support from many bankers and merchants. On April 9, 1863, the Russian Emperor signed the Charter of the first Saint-Petersburg Society of Mutual credit. On March 17, 1864, the society started operating. Now small Russian traders were saved the need to take loans from foreign banks. The first society of mutual credit had triggered similar organizations throughout the empire.

First the society was made of 300 members, all rich merchants and industrialists. Later it became more focused on smaller business. Accounts operations brought the society the most profit. In 1864 the operations with running accounts brought income of 4,000,000 Rubles, and this number was rising each year (over 17,000,000 in 1865 and over 40,000,000 in 1866) reaching its peak in 1869 - over 395,000,000 Rubles. The success had resulted in membership growing each year (from 300 in 1864 to the peak in 1874 - 9,072 members). Members included both individuals and organizations.

The society offered services from bill issuing to loans and deposits. The company was first in Russia to have introduced bank checks and running accounts. The society attracted many large companies and organizations. It often gave loans to the State Bank of the Russian Empire.

Apart from business interests, the society was known for its philanthropy. Society employees had additional bonuses to salaries, which rose according to inflation. The society shared in social activities, including support of regions suffering from low harvest, war campaigns and monuments setup. The Society's employees and poorest members received monetary support for their children's education.

== Management ==
The society was managed by a board (pravlenie) composed of five persons supervised by deputies elected for three years by the general assembly. Instead of salaries the members of the board were given 15% of the Society's profit to share between each other privately. The members of the board were elected by voting at the general assembly every three year. The president was chosen from the board. Each member of the board had to manage a certain field of operation.

Together with the deputies, the Board made the Council of the Society which usually gathered each month.

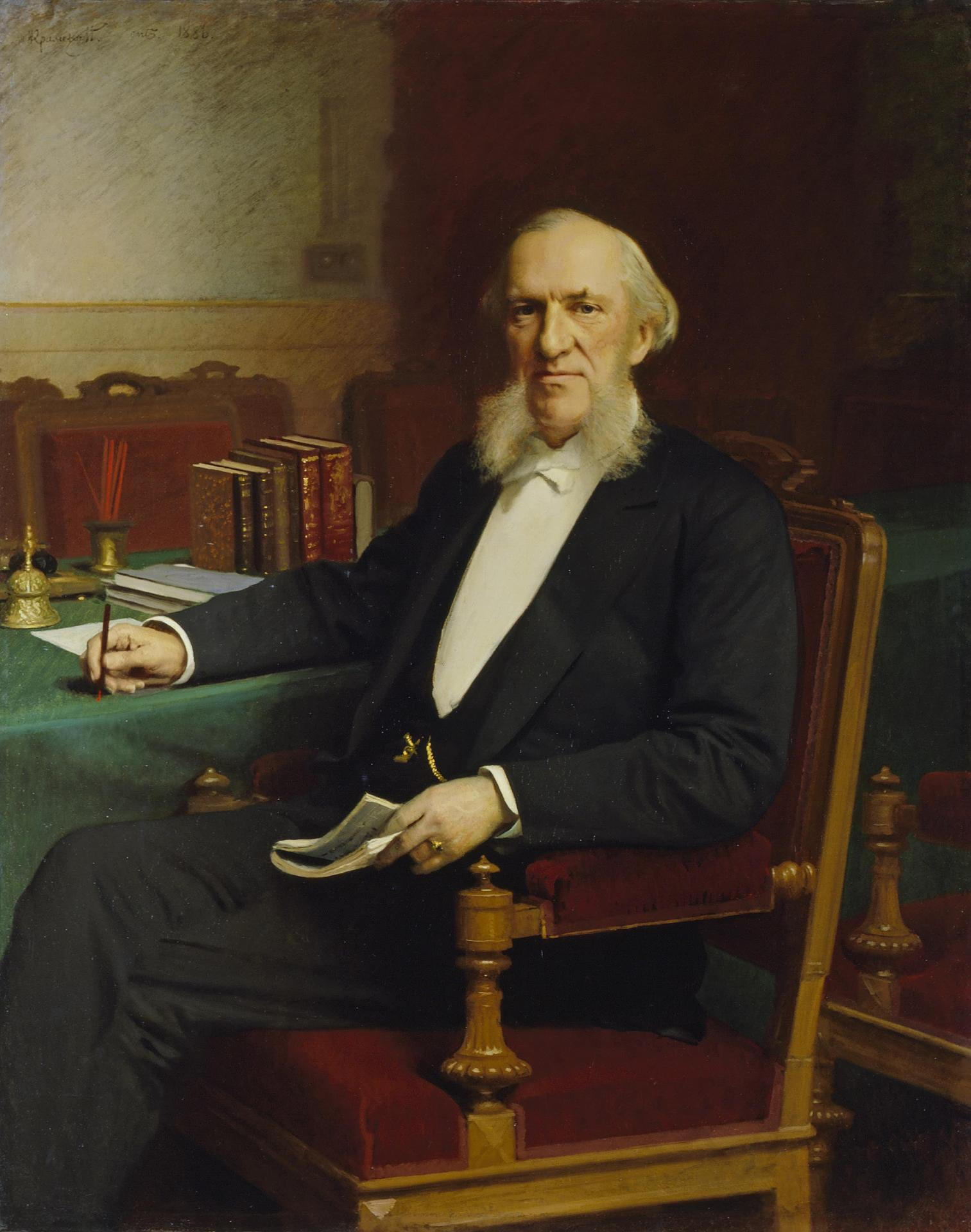
Evgeny Lamansky by Ivan Kramskoy, 1886.

Aspiring members were chosen by the committee of 20 persons gathering each week. The general assembly was called for every year.

== The building ==
In 1864, the State Bank gave them a small place in its building. Later, in 1871, the society found a larger place in a private apartment in Lesnikov's house located on 18/27 Ekaterininsky canal. But it had soon turned out that the places they occupied were not enough for keeping financial papers and assets. In 1887 the board suggested that the General Assembly give them a loan of 500,000 Rubles to construct a building for the Society. The construction was charged with Count Paul-Jules de Suzor. The Assembly commissioned a board member Mikhail Nikitich Kobyzev (Michel Kobyseff) and Count Suzor to Europe in order to study the organization of bank and credit. Upon their return, Suzor's project was approved and the construction was supervised by Kobyzev. In 1890 the society moved into the new building.

The new building was organized by the most advanced trends in banking of that time. From the European trip, Kobyzev brought the idea of Safety deposit boxes , which was successfully implemented in Russia. The deposit boxes turned out to be so popular that the society had to rent more places in order to set up new ones.

The new building was magnificent, with granite and marble, and electric lighting. The building was provided with fire-proof rooms and doors for safe storage of documents and assets. The cost of construction was so high that the society failed to pay it off by the October Revolution.

== See also ==
- Russo-Asiatic Bank
- Volga-Kama Commercial Bank
- Saint Petersburg International Commercial Bank
- Russian Bank for Foreign Trade
- Moscow Merchant Bank
