= Azov-Don Commercial Bank =

Former bank in Russia

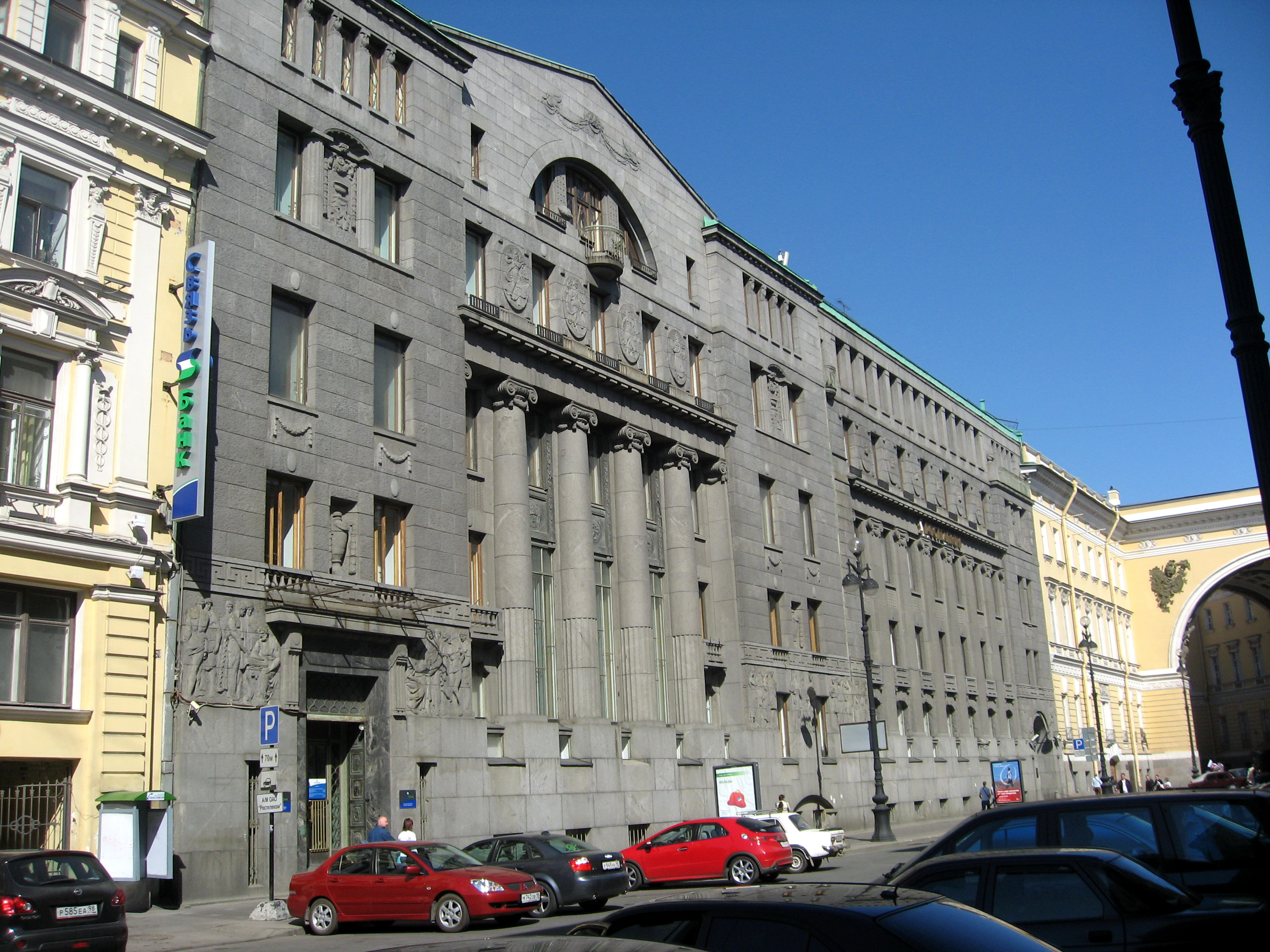
Former head office of the bank, Bol'shaya Morskaya Ulitsa 3–5 in Saint Petersburg

The Azov-Don Commercial Bank or Azovsko-Donskoi Commercial Bank (Russian: Азовско-Донской коммерческий банк), often referred to simply as the Azov-Don Bank, was one of the largest joint-stock commercial banks in the late Russian Empire. It was founded in 1871 in the city of Taganrog on the shores of the Sea of Azov, to which its name refers as well as the Don River. In 1903, it relocated its head office to Saint Petersburg. In late 1917 following the Russian Revolution, like all other commercial banks in Russia, it was absorbed into the State Bank with no compensation to its shareholders.

== Overview ==
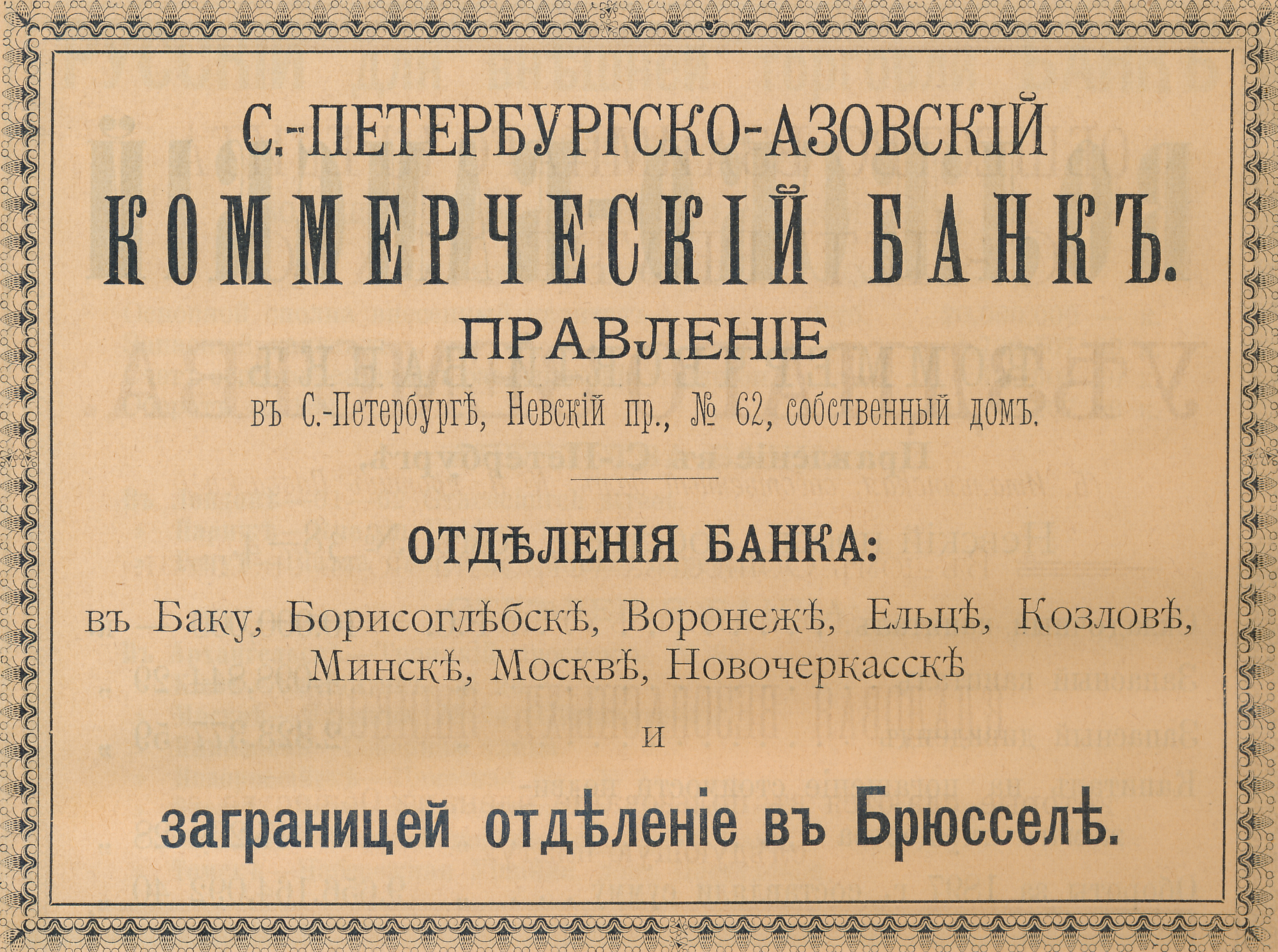
Advert of the short-lived Saint-Petersburg-Azov Commercial Bank, 1899

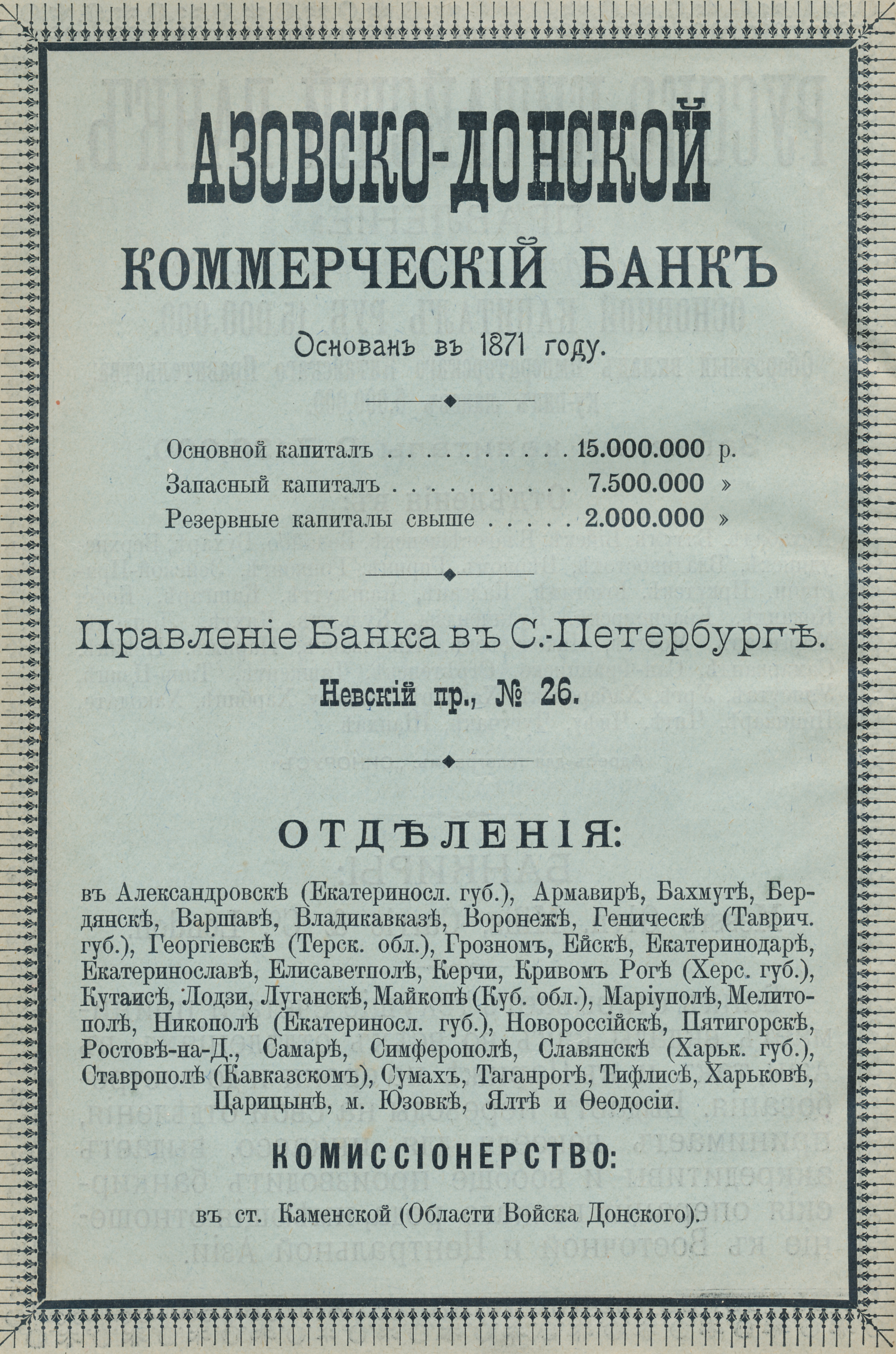
Azov-Don Bank advert with list of branches, 1907

The bank's initial share capital amounted to 5 million roubles in 1871, and grew quickly despite an episode of serious financial distress in 1883. In the mid-1890s it became Russia's largest regional bank (i.e. not headquartered in either Saint Petersburg or Moscow), and by the start of the 20th century, it was the Russian Empire's sixth-largest private-sector bank by assets. By then, its network was still concentrated in what is now Southern Russia, Eastern Ukraine and Crimea, and the South Caucasus.

In the late 1880s, the Azov-Don Bank sponsored the creation of a separate affiliate in Saint Petersburg, branded the Saint-Petersburg-Azov Commercial Bank and led by financier Yakov S. Polyakov. That venture briefly flourished and erected an opulent head office on Nevsky Prospect, but collapsed in the financial crisis that hit Russia in 1899–1902, selling its head office in 1901 to the newly established Banque du Nord. Following the Saint-Petersburg-Azov Bank's insolvency in 1903, the management of the Azov-Don Bank moved to Saint Petersburg. Originally located at 26 Nevsky Prospect, the bank acquired buildings at 3 and 5 Bolshaya Morskaya Street to construct its own head office building according to the project by architect Fyodor Lidval in two stages, 1907-09 (with an iconic colossal portico) and 1912-13 (extension).

In 1905–1906, French banks bought ten thousand shares in the Azov-Don Bank. Along with financing trade, the bank took control over troubled enterprises and reorganised them into new joint-stock companies. By 1907, it had 38 branches in Armavir, Georgiyevsk, Grozny, Maykop, Novorossiysk, Pyatigorsk, Rostov-on-Don, Samara, Stavropol, Taganrog (the former head office), Tsaritsin (later Volgograd), Vladikavkaz, Voronezh, Yekaterinodar (later Krasnodar), and Yeysk in present-day Russia; Alexandrovsk (later Zaporizhzhia), Bakhmut, Berdiansk, Feodosia, Henichesk, Luhansk, Kerch, Kharkiv, Kryvyi Rih, Mariupol, Melitopol, Nikopol, Simferopol, Sloviansk, Sumy, Yalta, Yekaterinoslav (later Dnipro), and Yuzovka (later Donetsk) in present-day Ukraine; Łódź and Warsaw in present-day Poland; Kutaisi and Tbilisi in Georgia; and Elizavetpol (later Ganja) in Azerbaijan. Its shares were listed on the Berlin Stock Exchange in 1910 and on the Paris Stock Exchange in 1911. In 1912 it acquired a large stake in the newly created Paris-based Banque des Pays du Nord, with Boris Kamenka being appointed to the latter's board.

By 1917, the Azov-Don Bank controlled over 90 companies, and its network had expanded to 73 branches throughout the Empire. Its position was especially strong in ferrous and non-ferrous metallurgy, coal industry, and production of building materials. It was nationalized shortly after the October Revolution by a decree of the Council of People's Commissars of the Russian Soviet Federative Socialist Republic in December 1917.

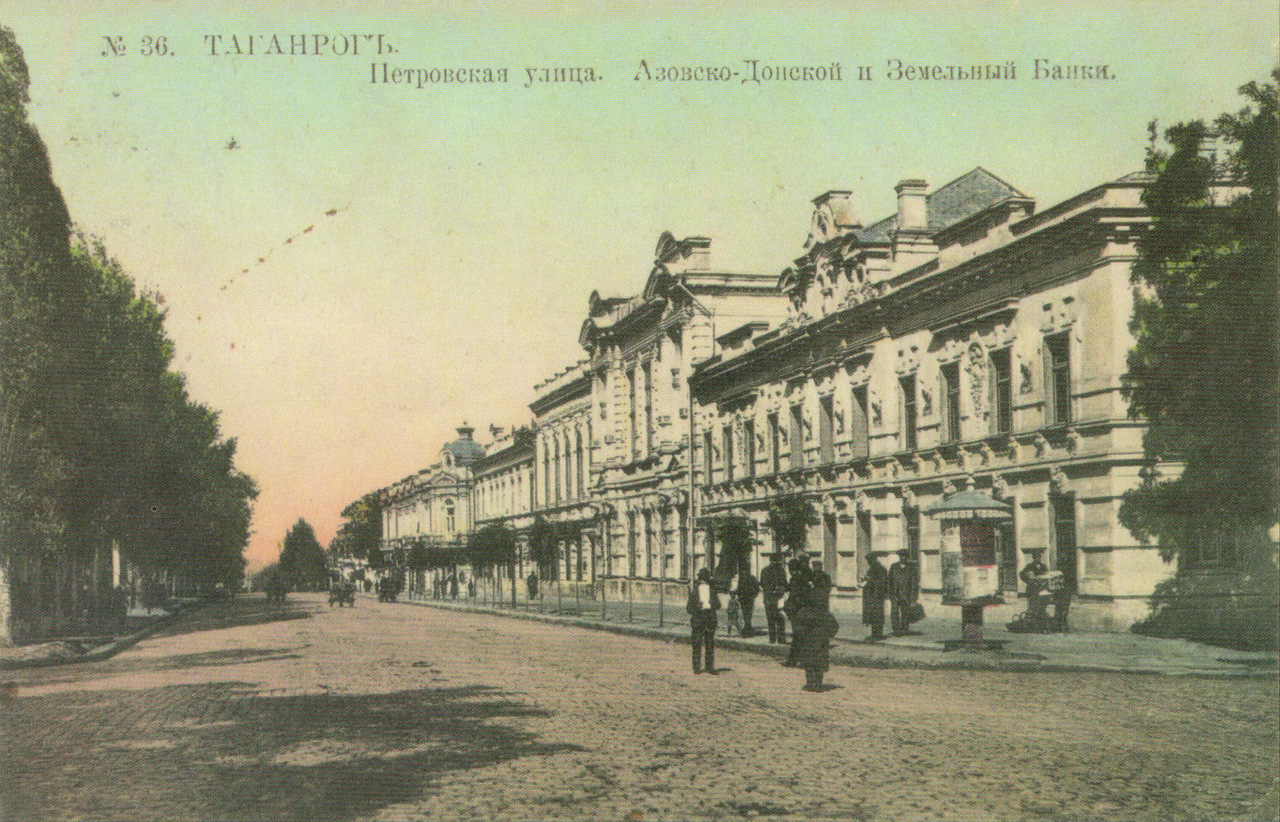
Head office in Taganrog, early 20th century

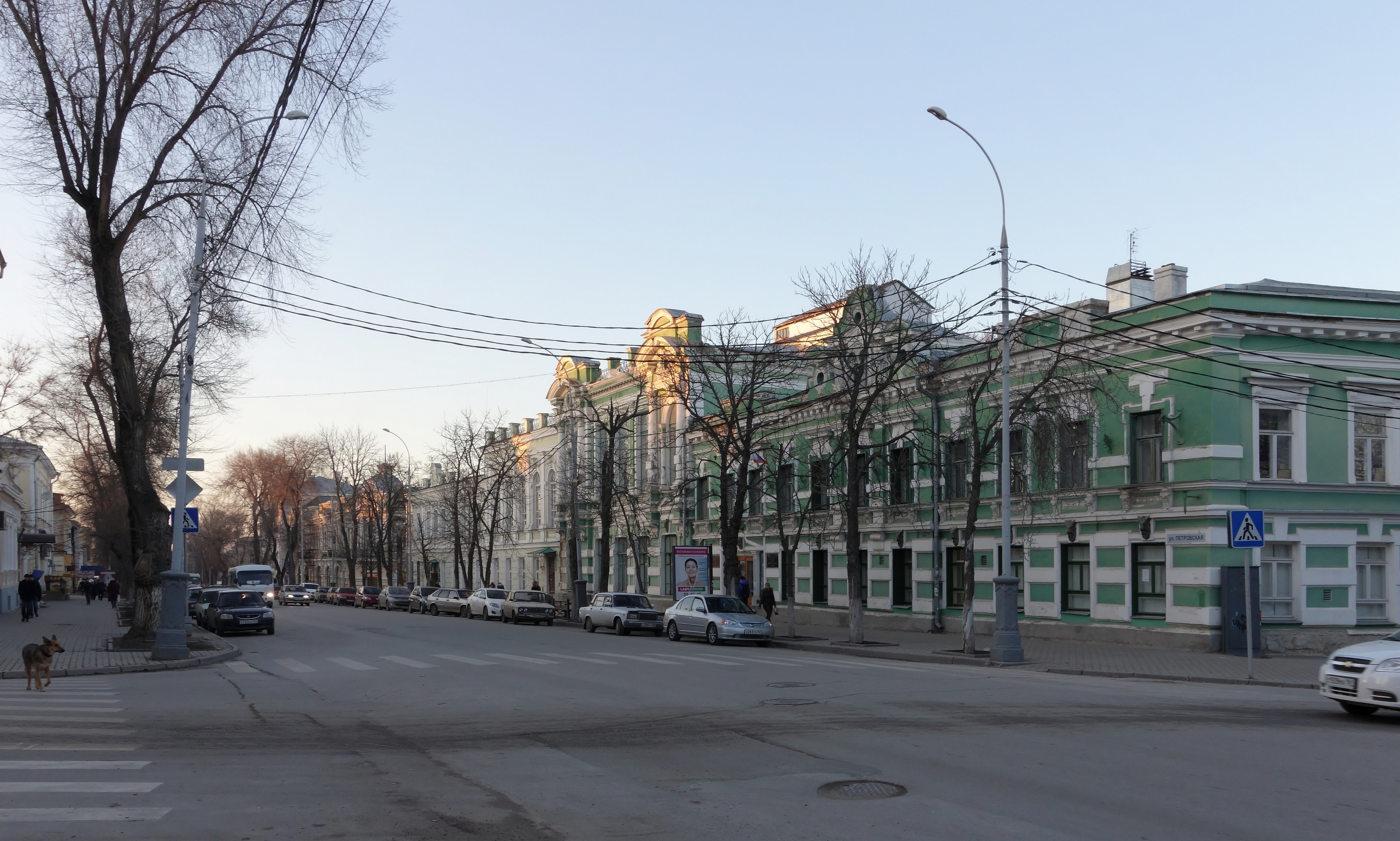
The same building in 2015

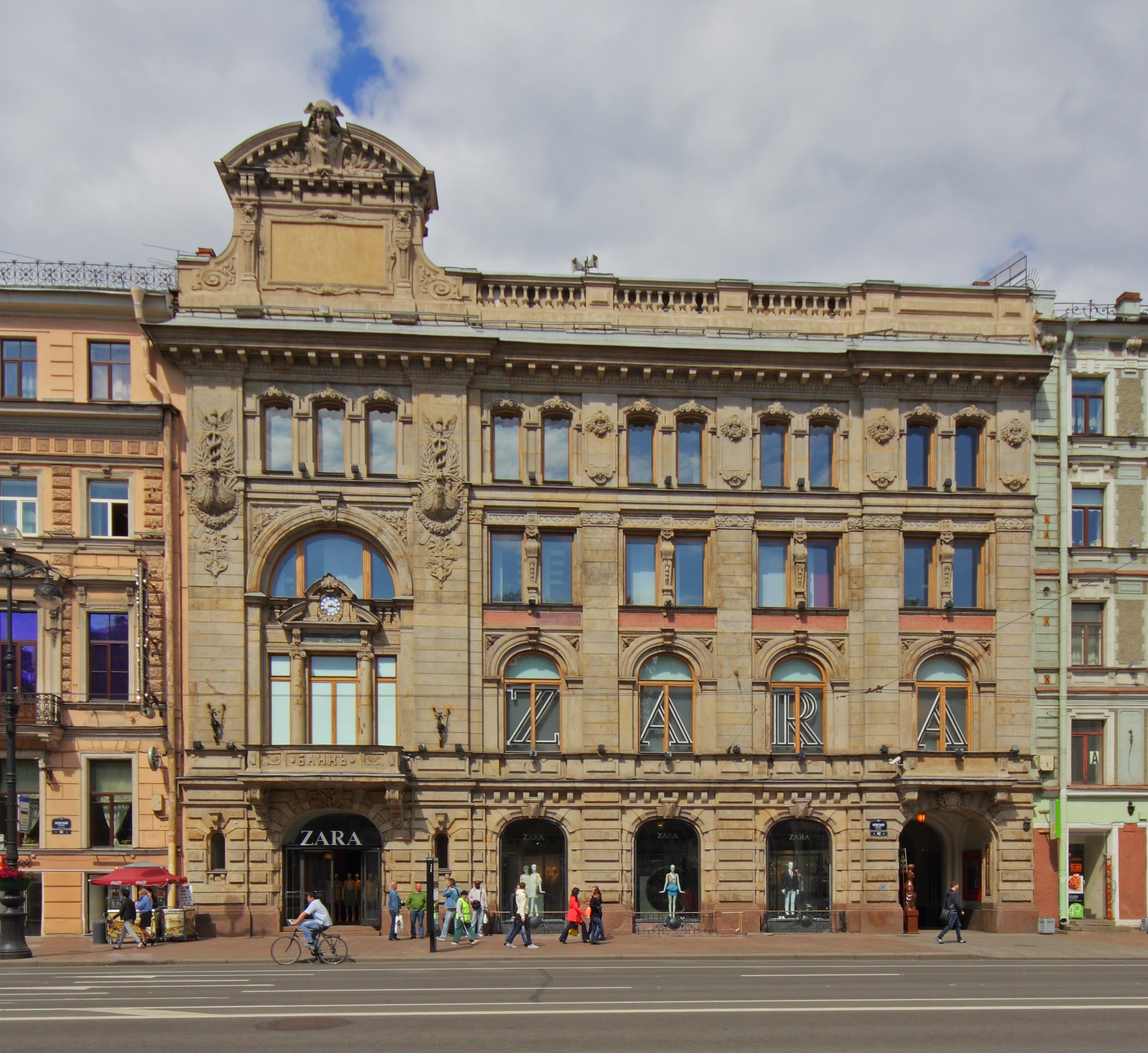
Head office erected by the Saint-Petersburg-Azov Commercial Bank, 56 Nevsky Prospect; later seat of the Russo-Asiatic Bank

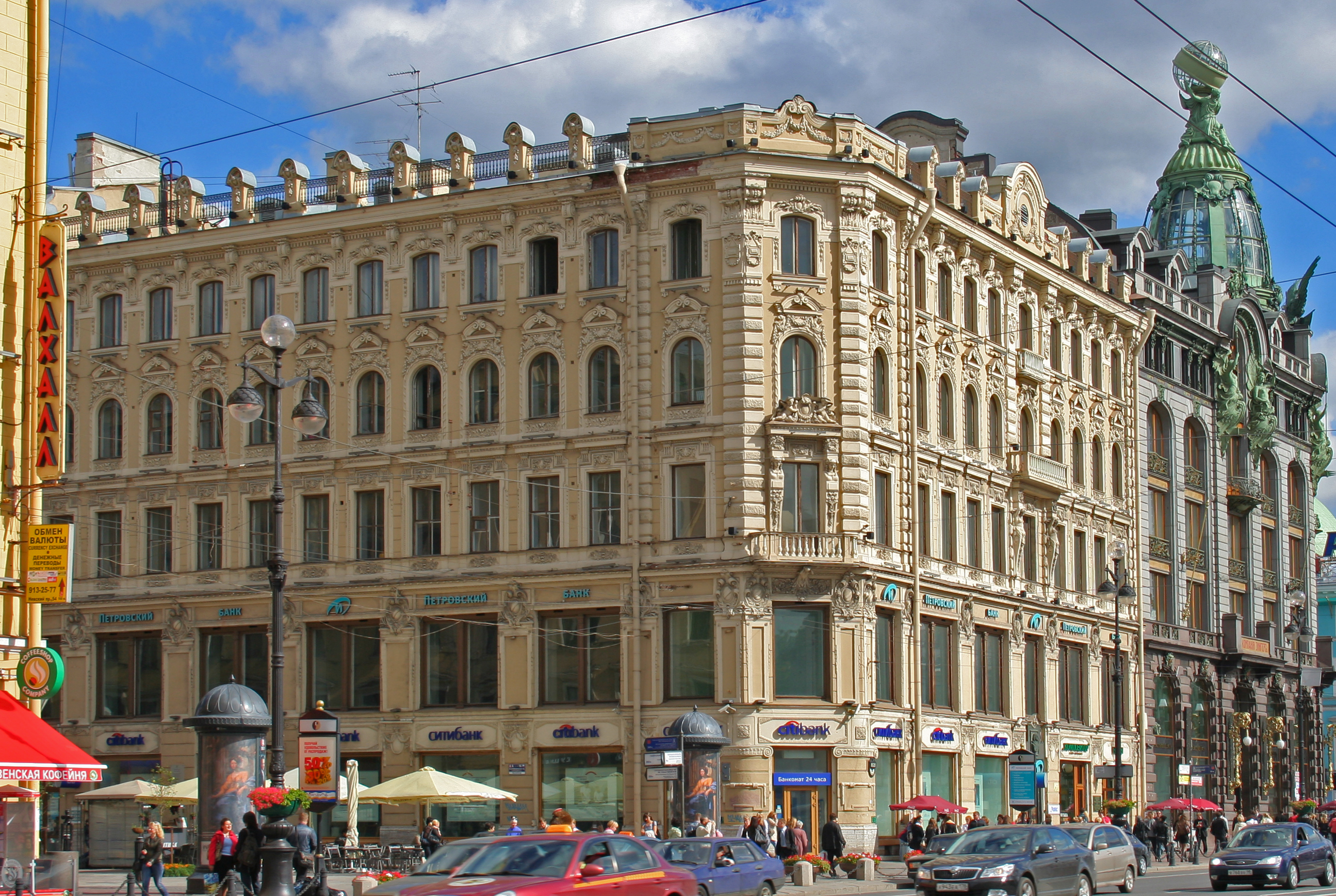
26 Nevsky Prospect in Saint Petersburg, the bank's head office from 1903 to 1909

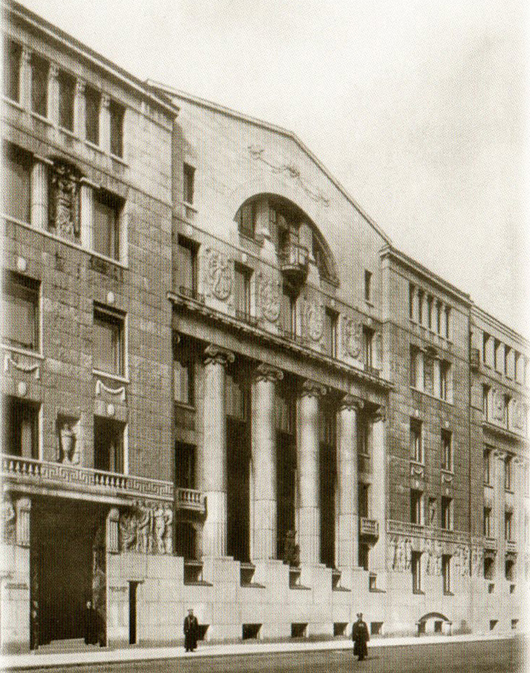
Saint Petersburg Head office in 1913

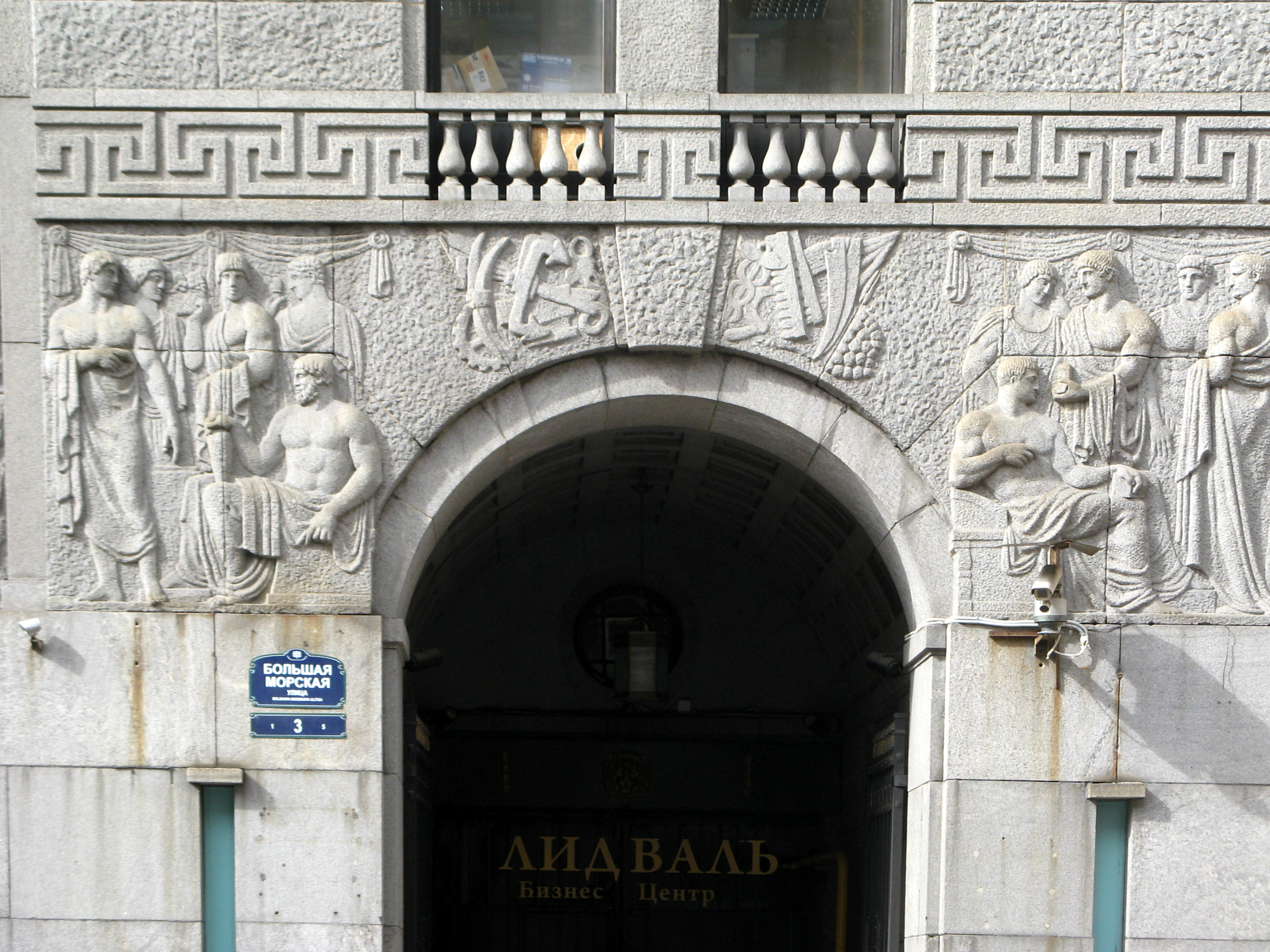
Sculpted decoration of the Saint Petersburg head office

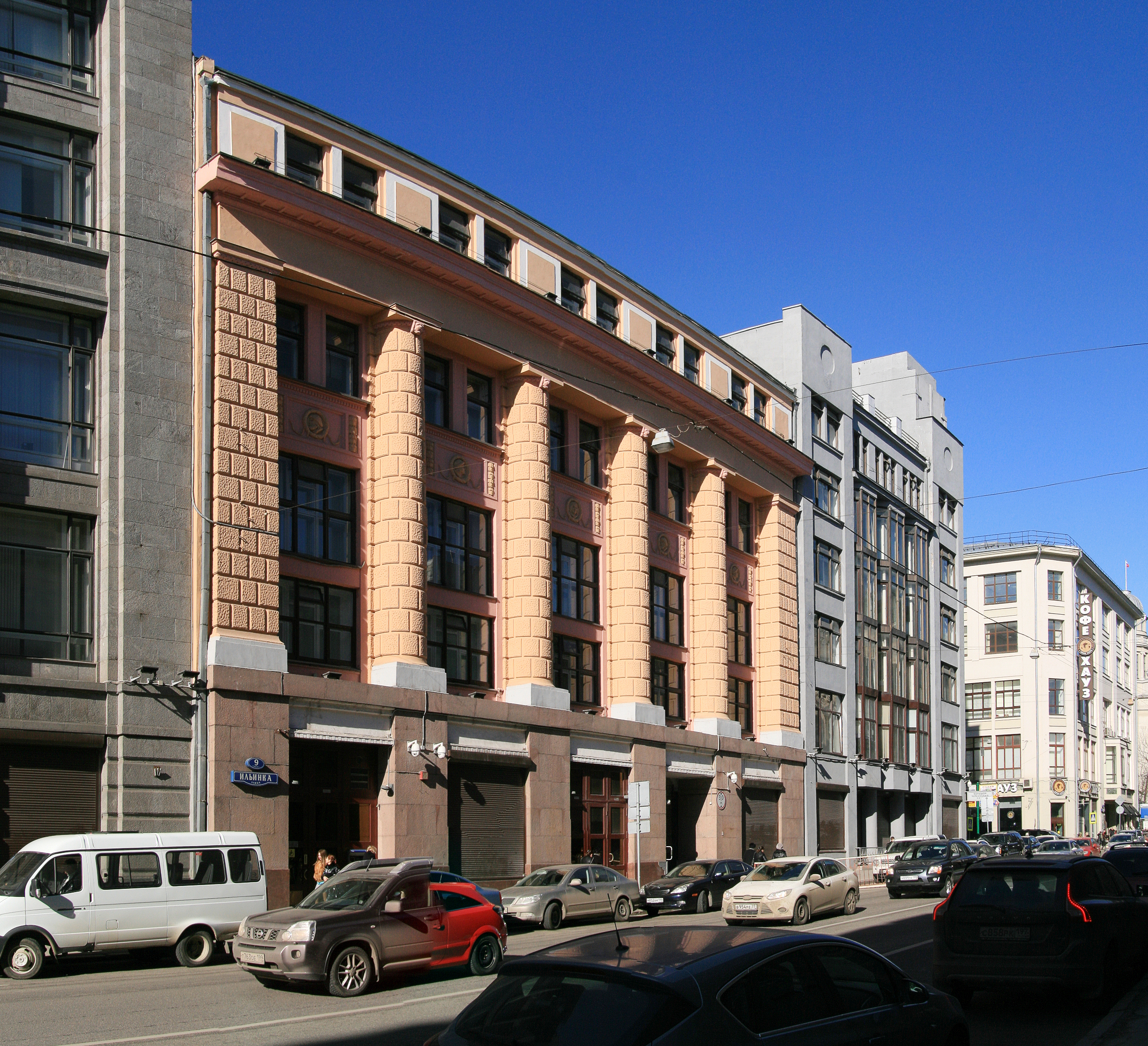
Former branch building in Moscow, Ilyinka 9

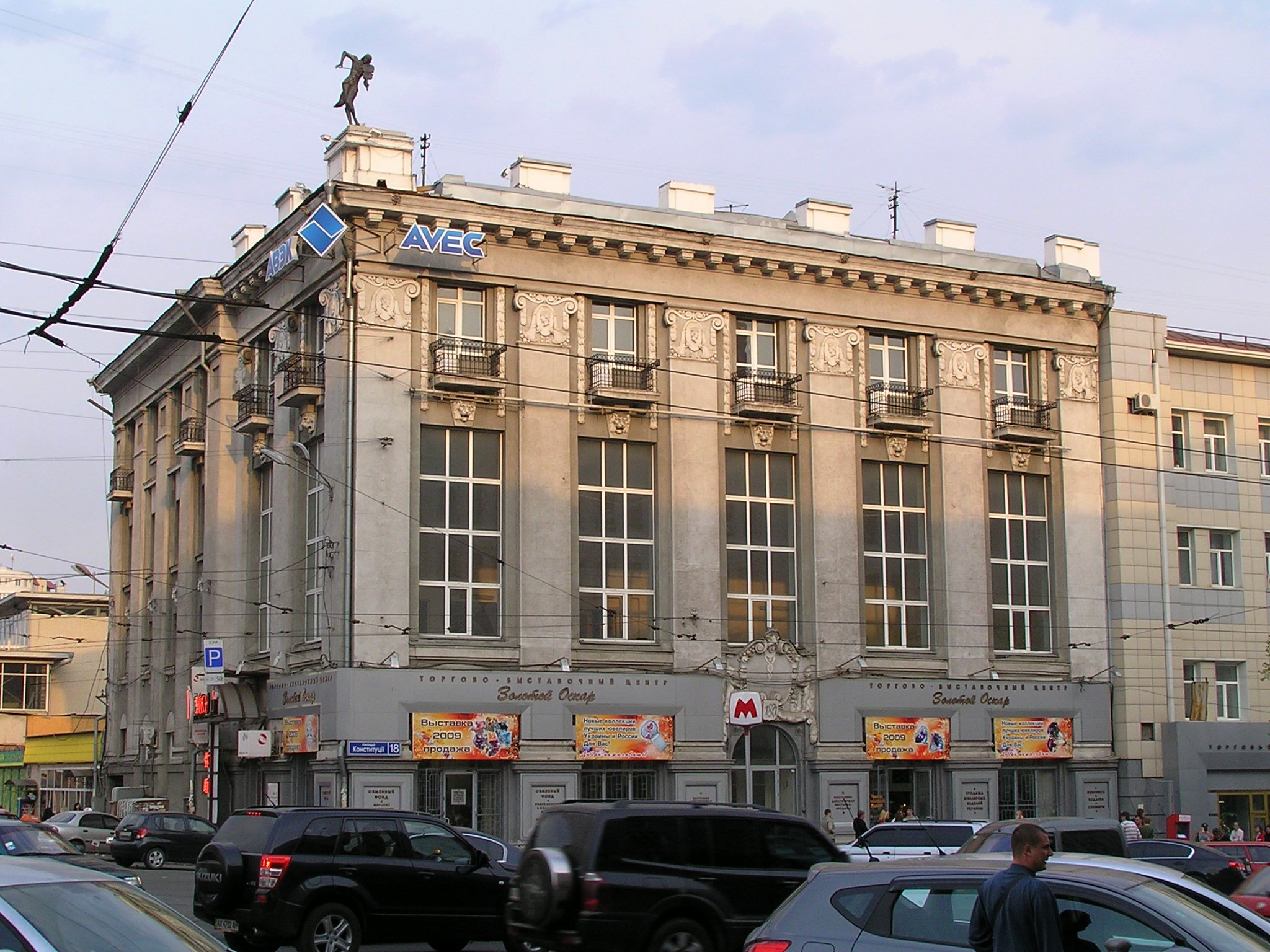
Branch building in Kharkiv, Constitution Square 18

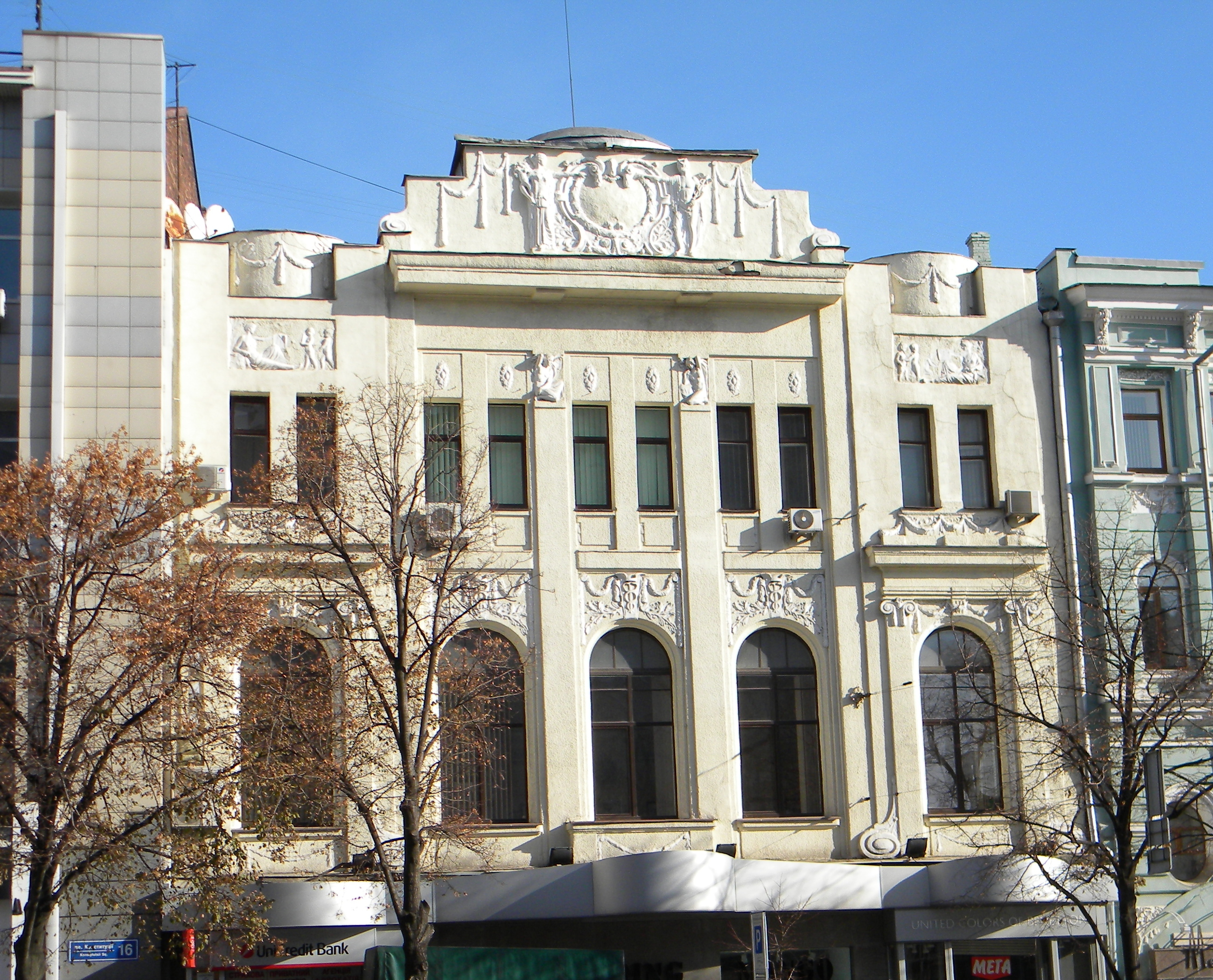
Another branch in Kharkiv, Constitution Square 14

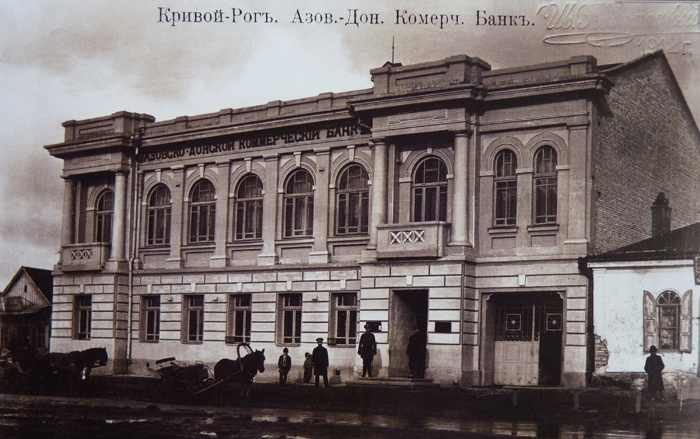
Branch building in Kryvyi Rih, 1912

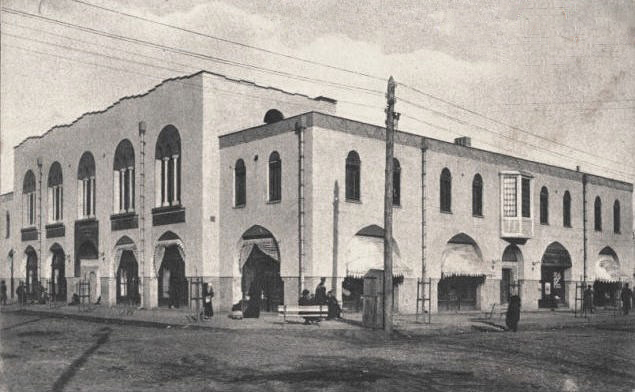
Former branch building in Grozny

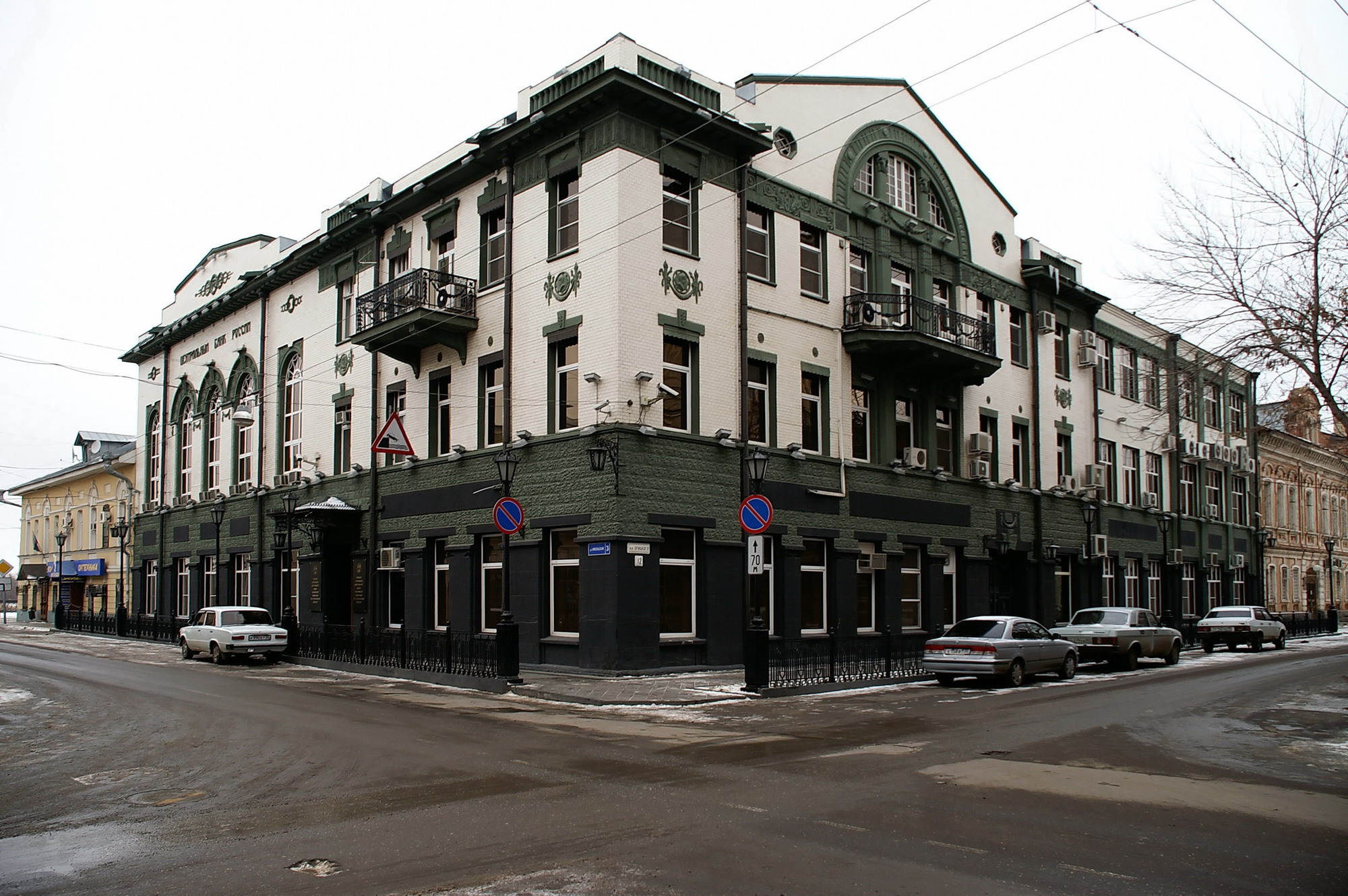
Former branch building in Astrakhan

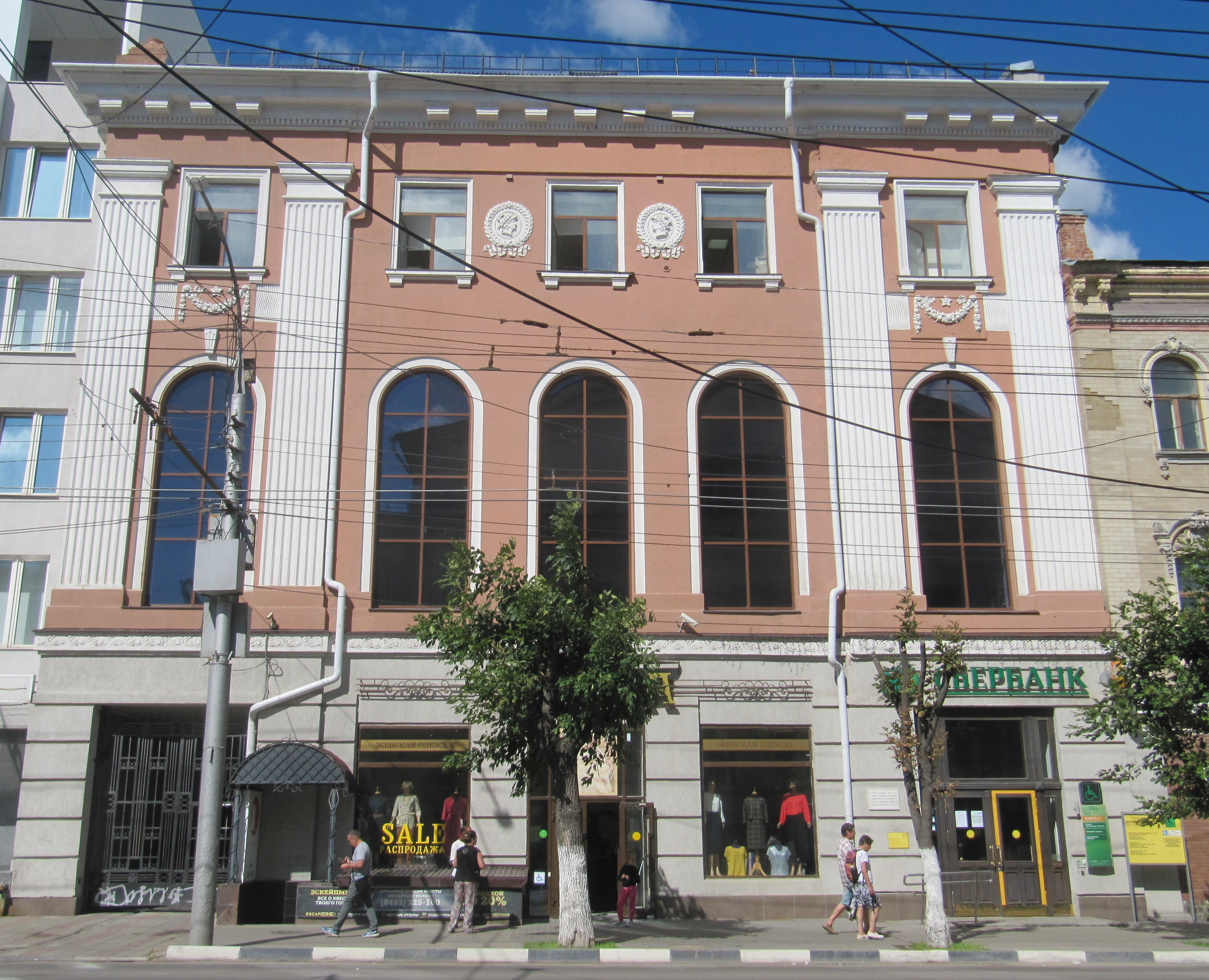
Former branch building in Saratov

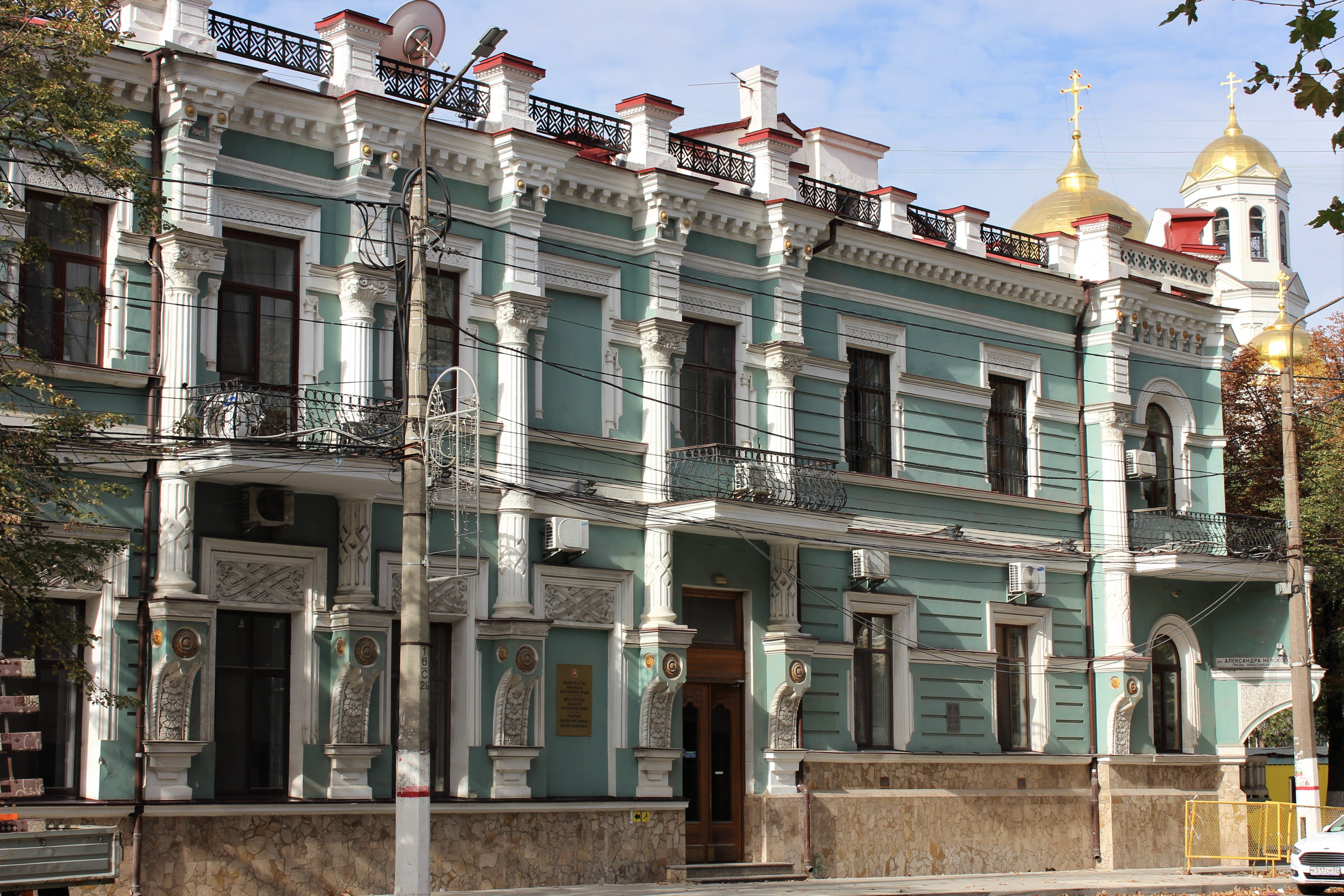
Former branch in Simferopol

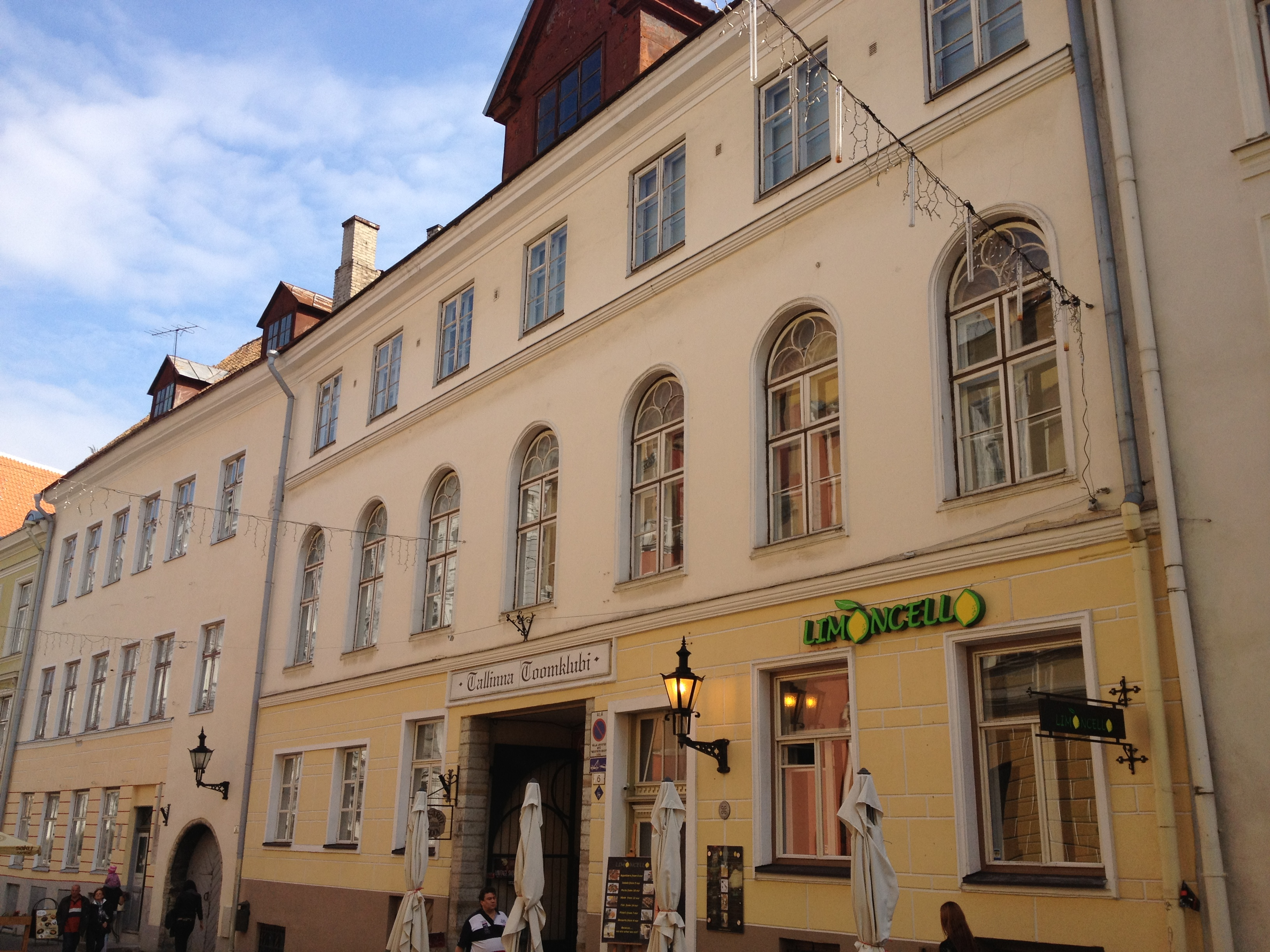
Former branch in Tallinn, opened in 1912

== See also ==
- Saint Petersburg International Commercial Bank
- Saint-Petersburg Society of Mutual Credit
- Volga-Kama Commercial Bank
- Russo-Asiatic Bank
- Russian Bank for Foreign Trade
- Moscow Merchant Bank
