= Karol Jaroszyński =

Polish businessman (1877–1929)

Karol Jaroszyński Karol Lucjan Jan Jaroszyński Charles Jaroszynski
- Карл Иосифович Ярошински
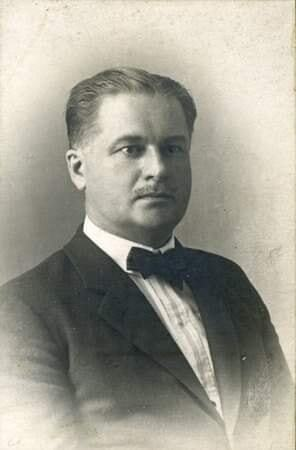
- Born: 13 December 1877; Kiev, Russian Empire
- Died: 8 September 1929 (aged 51); Warsaw, Poland
- Resting place: Powązki Cemetery
- Occupation: Businessman
- Organization(s): Karol Jaroszyński's property and interests management
- Parent(s): Józef Klemens Jaroszyński; Karolina Borsza-Drzewiecka

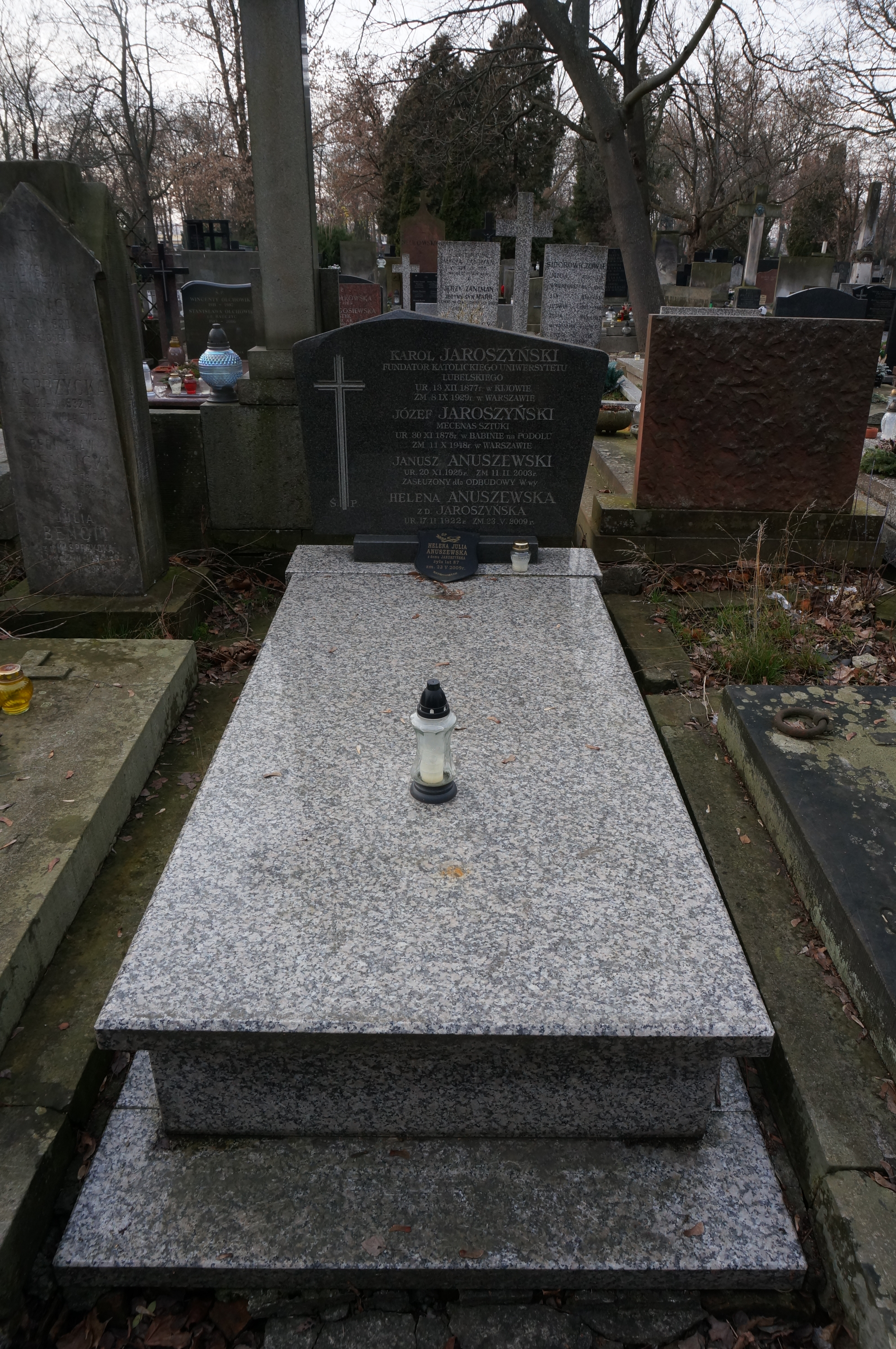
Jaroszyński grave at Powązki Cemetery, Warsaw

Karol Jaroszyński, Karol Lucjan Jan Jaroszyński, Карл Иосифович Ярошински, Charles Jaroszynski (December 13, 1877 – September 8, 1929) was a Polish mason, Imperial Russian businessman, financier and philanthropist. Friend and benefactor of the family of Tsar Nicholas II of Romanov during her retreat in Siberia.

== Biography ==
Son of Józef Klemens Jaroszyński (1826–1885) and Karolina Borsza-Drzewiecka (c. 1837–1921). He attended the Men's School of the Society for the Promotion of Secondary School and the First Classical Junior High School in Kiev (died 1896). Graduate of the Department of Commerce of the Moscow Real School (Московское реальное училище) (1899). Pro-Allied financier from a Polish noble family living in Podolia near Vinnytsia. The owner of the Antopol, Krzyżopol and Wapniarka estates. Also known as the Russian Vanderbilt. In March 1916, his fortune was estimated at 26.1 million rubles, 300 million rubles in bill of exchange debts and 950 million rubles in gold and real estate. It can therefore be assumed that he was one of the richest and influential people in tsarist Russia, and the richest Pole at the turn of the 19th and 20th centuries. He was the owner or co-owner of 53 sugar factories and refineries, 12 banks, incl.

- Commercial and Industrial Bank in St. Petersburg (Торгово-промышленный банк),
- Russian Foreign Trade Bank in St. Petersburg (Русский для внешней торговли банк),
- Russo-Asiatic Bank in St. Petersburg (Русско-Азиатский банк),
- Saint Petersburg International Commercial Bank,
- Private Commercial Bank in Kiev (Киевский Частный Коммерческий Банк),
- United Bank in Moscow (Соединённый банк),
- Siberian Commercial Bank in Yekaterinburg (Сибирский торговый банк).

He also remained the owner of a number of mines, steel plants, railway companies, 2 shipping companies on the Dnieper, oil companies, e.g. Russian Nafta (Русская нефть) and Ter Akopov (Тер-Акопов), insurance companies, 8 metal and machine factories (2 in Kiev), textile factories, cement plants, 2 luxury hotels in Kiev (eg European Hotel), press publications "Novoye Vremia" (Новое Время, New Times) and "Birżewyje Viedomosti" (Биржевые ведомости, Stock Exchange News), forest areas. To manage the syndicate, Jaroszyński created the Council, which was composed of 5 ministers and 10 senators, incl. former president of the Council of Ministers Vladimir Kokovtsov (1853-1943) and former director of the police department Alexei Lopukhin (1864-1928), while the direct administration of the property under the name "Karol Jaroszyński's property and interests management" was located in the Kiev Grand Hotel (1917–1918). Jaroszyński maintained many facilities for his own and family needs, e.g. palaces — in Antopol, 2 in Saint Petersburg, at ul. B. Morska (ул. Большая Морская 52 / наб. Р. Мойки 97) (1916-) and on Kamienna Island, in Kiev at Wał Jarosława 1 (Ярославов Вал) (1907-), houses in Odessa, London, Beaulieu-sur-Mer, Monte Carlo and Warsaw, 13 tenement houses in Kiev and 8 in St. Petersburg. The main figure and spokesman for the so-called "Banking intrigue" in Russia, the aim of which was to financially support the anti-Bolshevik forces in Russia by the Allies. He stayed in London (1919); in 1920 he evacuated on the last ship from Crimea via Constantinople to Paris, where he resided at the Vendome hotel. Then he lived in Warsaw in the Sobański Palace (1921–1923), where he served as;

- the director of Bank Rosyjsko-Polski SA in Warsaw (Russian-Polish Bank) (1921-1922), and at the same time
- the president of Bank Zjednoczonych Przemysłowców SA in Warsaw (United Industrialists Bank) (1921–1923).

At that time, he was also the main shareholder (56%) of Bank Towarowy SA in Warsaw (Merchant Bank) (1922). In 1923, he went to the West of Europe, and returned to Warsaw in 1926.

He was a freemason, gambler (in 1909 he "smashed" the casino resources in Monte Carlo), philanthropist, in 1917 he was the buyer of the house of Senator Połovtsov at the cost of 1 million rubles for the dormitory for Polish students in St. Petersburg (DS "Zgoda"), co-founder of the Catholic University of Lublin (in the amount of 8,098,870 rubles).

He died in the hospital of the Holy Spirit in Warsaw and was buried at the Powązki Cemetery.

== Sources ==
- Ю. Ю. Рассулин: Ярошинский Карл Иосифович, 2016
- Grażyna Karolewicz: Karol Jaroszyński 1877—1929, fundator Katolickiego Uniwersytetu Lubelskiego, Polihymnia 2000
- Ярошинский Карл Иосифович
- А. А. Фурсенко: Концерн К. И. Ярошинского в 1917—1918 гг.
