= Boris Kamenka =

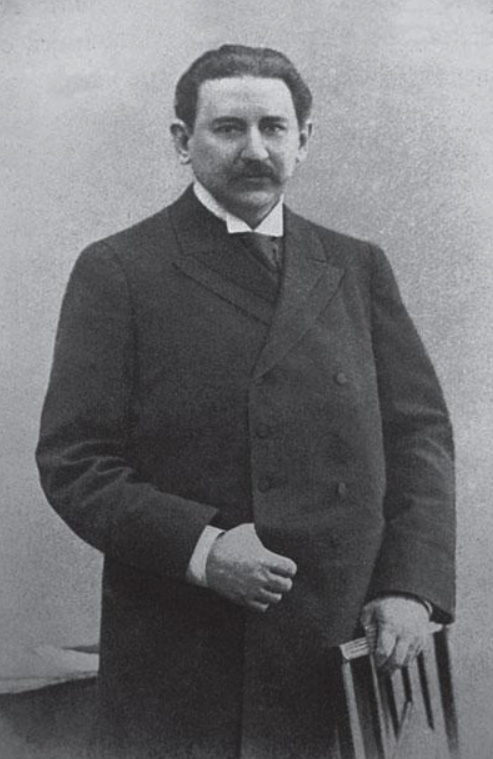
Boris Kamenka

Boris Abramovich Kamenka (9 January 1855, Kiev - 2 April 1942) was a Russian entrepreneur and banker in the Russian Empire. He was one of the richest people in Russia before the Russian Revolution.

He joined the board of the Azov-Don Commercial Bank in 1894. In 1903 when the bank moved from Taganrog to St Petersburg, he became the managing director. Then in 1910 he became the chairman of the bank. In this position he was able to join the boards of a number of joint stock companies which the Azov-Don Bank financed: the Rossiya Insurance Company, the Russian Society for Export Trade, the Tokmakov Railway company, the Taganrog Metallurgical Company.

He was a member of the councils of the Bank of Paris for the Nordic Countries (since 1912) and of the Congresses of Representatives of Industry and Commerce. He was a member of the economic board of the St. Petersburg synagogue and the board of the Jewish Colonisation Association. Financial adviser to the Provisional Government.

He took an active part in the life of the Jewish population of the empire – he was the chairman of the Jewish community in Rostov-on-Don, a member of the economic administration of the community in St. Petersburg, and was engaged in charitable activities to improve the lives of Jews. He played a prominent role in the public sphere through his nephew, a member of the board of the Azov-Don Bank, A. I. Kaminka, who was a member of the Central Committee of the Cadet Party, and supported the activities of the Constitutional Democratic Party and its organ, the newspaper Rech. He was a member of the Rostov City Duma, a foreman of the Exchange Committee, chairman of the Jewish community, and director of the Rostov branch of the Imperial Musical Society.

== Family ==
He had five children: Alexander, Mikhail, George, Ippolita and Daria.
