= Russian Bank for Foreign Trade =

Former bank in Russia

Russian Bank for Foreign Trade Русский для внешней торговли банк
- Company type: joint-stock company
- Industry: Banking, Financial services
- Founded: 1871 (155 years ago)
- Defunct: 1917
- Headquarters: Russian Empire, Saint Petersburg, at 32 Bolshaya Morskaya St.
- Number of locations: 111 branches
- Key people: L. F. Davidov, W.I. Timiriazew, Karol Jaroszyński
- Total equity: 60.000.000 ROU (1917)

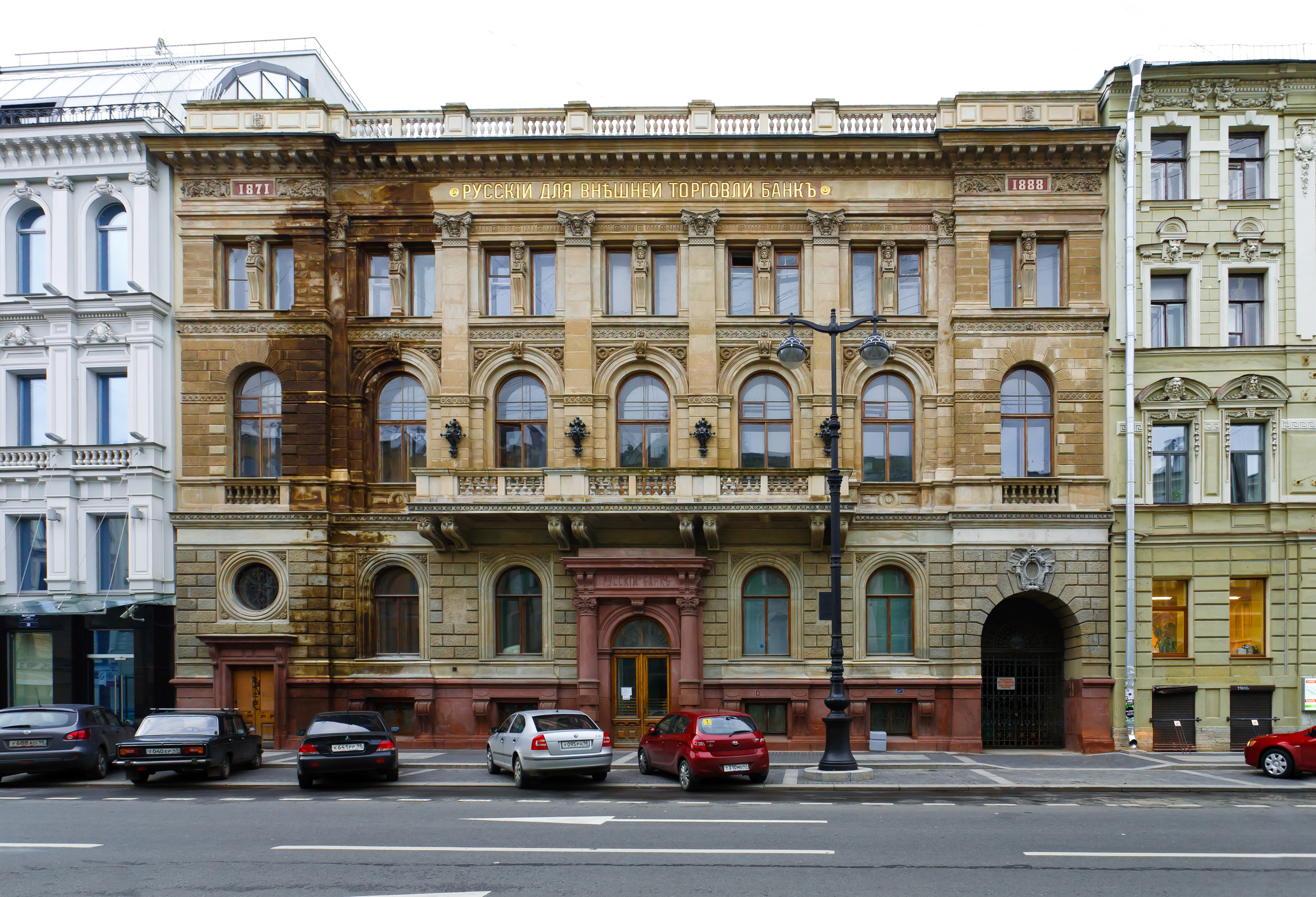
HQ of bank in St. Petersburg at 32 Bolshaya Morskaya St. (1888-1916)

The Russian Bank for Foreign Trade (Russian: Русский для внешней торговли банк) was one of a group of banks in Saint Petersburg that played an important part in Russian international trade in the second half of the nineteenth century and up to the Russian Revolution in 1917. The bank was Russia's fourth-largest private-sector bank by total assets at the start of the 20th century, and was still one of the largest in Russia prior to the revolution. The bank was nationalised by a decree of 14 December 1917 leading to a legal battle in France over its deposits in that country.

== Building in St. Petersburg ==
Since 1888, the bank was located in its own building in St. Petersburg at 32 Bolshaya Morskaya Street, which was acquired by the bank in 1887–1888 and rebuilt according to the design of the architect Victor Schröter with the participation of N. Makarov.

In 1915–1916, at Bolshaya Morskaya Street, 18, the construction of the building of the bank was started (but not completed due to the revolution) designed by architects Fyodor Lidval and Leon Benois, but now in this building, completed in 1929-1931, the State University of Technology and Design is located.

== See also ==
- Saint Petersburg International Commercial Bank
- Volga-Kama Commercial Bank
- Azov-Don Commercial Bank
- Russo-Asiatic Bank
- Moscow Merchant Bank
