= Volga-Kama Commercial Bank =

Former bank in Russia

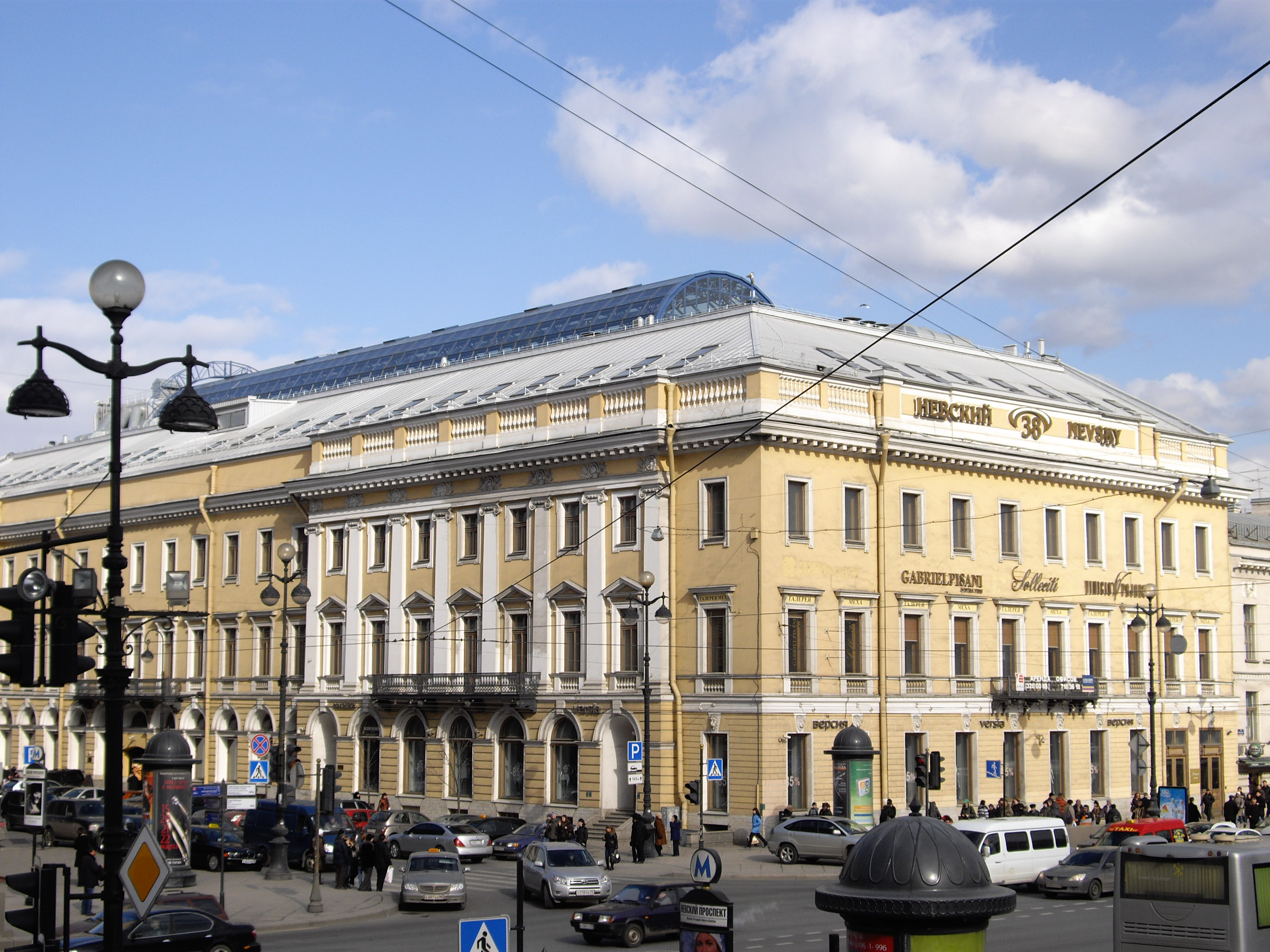
Building at 38 Nevsky Prospect in Saint Petersburg, the bank's head office from 1881 to 1917

The Volga-Kama Commercial Bank (sometimes Volzhsko-Kamsky Commercial Bank, Russian: Во́лжско-Ка́мский коммерческий банк), often referred to simply as the Volga-Kama Bank, was a major commercial bank of the Russian Empire. Founded in 1870, it was Russia's largest private-sector bank by total assets at the start of the 20th century. In late 1917 following the Russian Revolution, like all other commercial banks in Russia, it was absorbed into the State Bank with no compensation to its shareholders. Its name refers to the rivers Volga and Kama.

== Overview ==
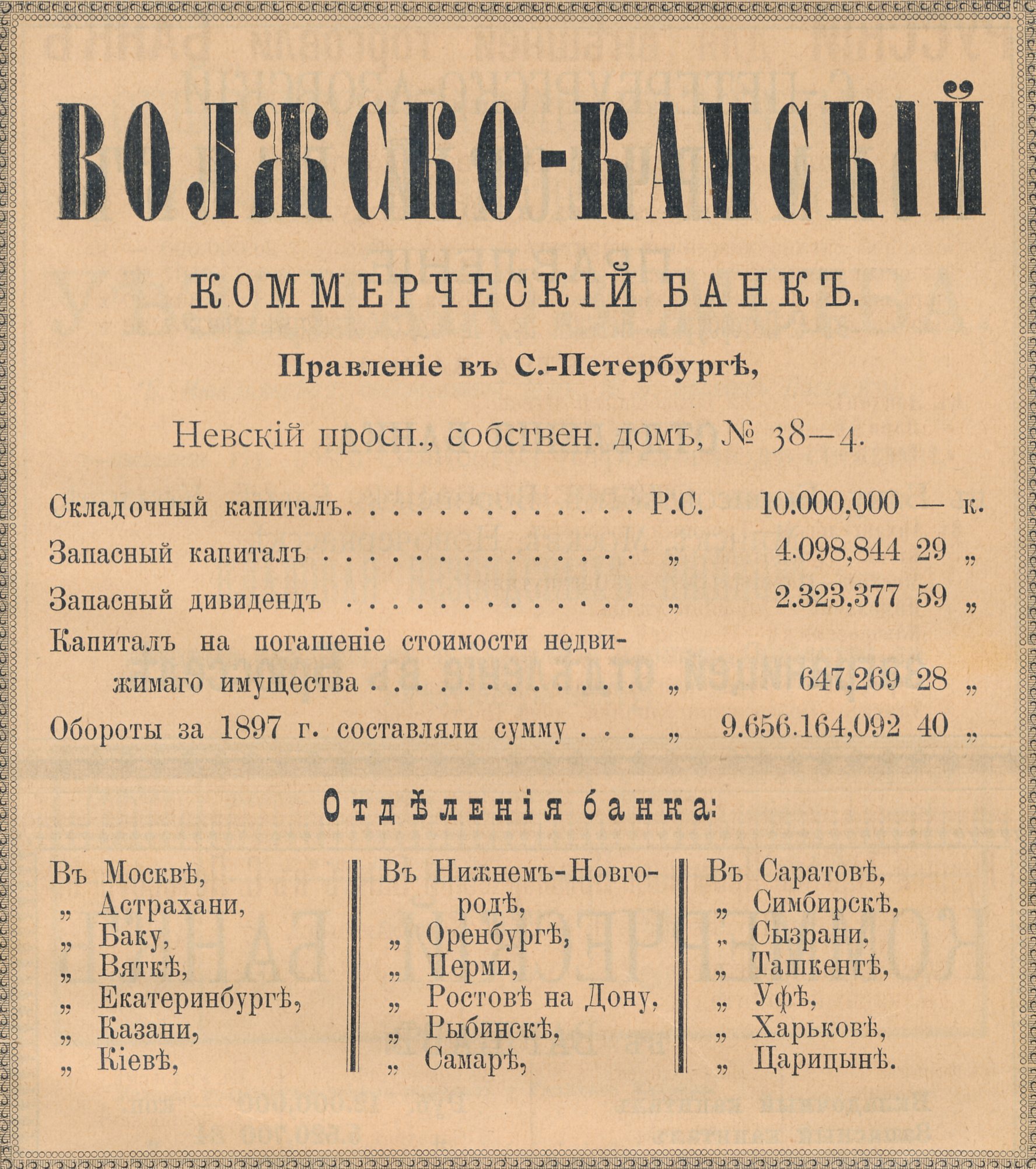
Advert for the Volga-Kama Bank, 1899

The bank's charter was approved by Alexander II on 24 February 1870, establishing as a joint-stock company with an initial authorized capital of 6 million rubles. The founders were a group of manufacturers and merchants led by Vasily Kokorev, who became its chairman in 1878.

From 1879 to 1917, the bank was near-continuously led by Alexander F. Mukhin, successively as director, member of the board, and eventually chairman, with only a six-year gap in 1906–1912. From 1907 to 1911 the managing director of the bank was Pyotr Bark, who later became Russian Minister of Finance.

By 1899, the Volga-Kama Bank had branches in Astrakhan, Baku, Kazan, Kharkiv, Kyiv, Moscow, Nizhny Novgorod, Orenburg, Perm, Rostov-on-Don, Rybinsk, Samara, Saratov, Simbirsk (later Ulyanovsk), Suzdal, Tashkent, Tsaritsin (later Volgograd), Ufa, Vyatka (later Kirov), and Yekaterinburg. By 1914, it had a network of 60 branches in the Empire, the majority in the Volga Region and the Urals. By then, its place among Russian commercial banks had declined to sixth rank.

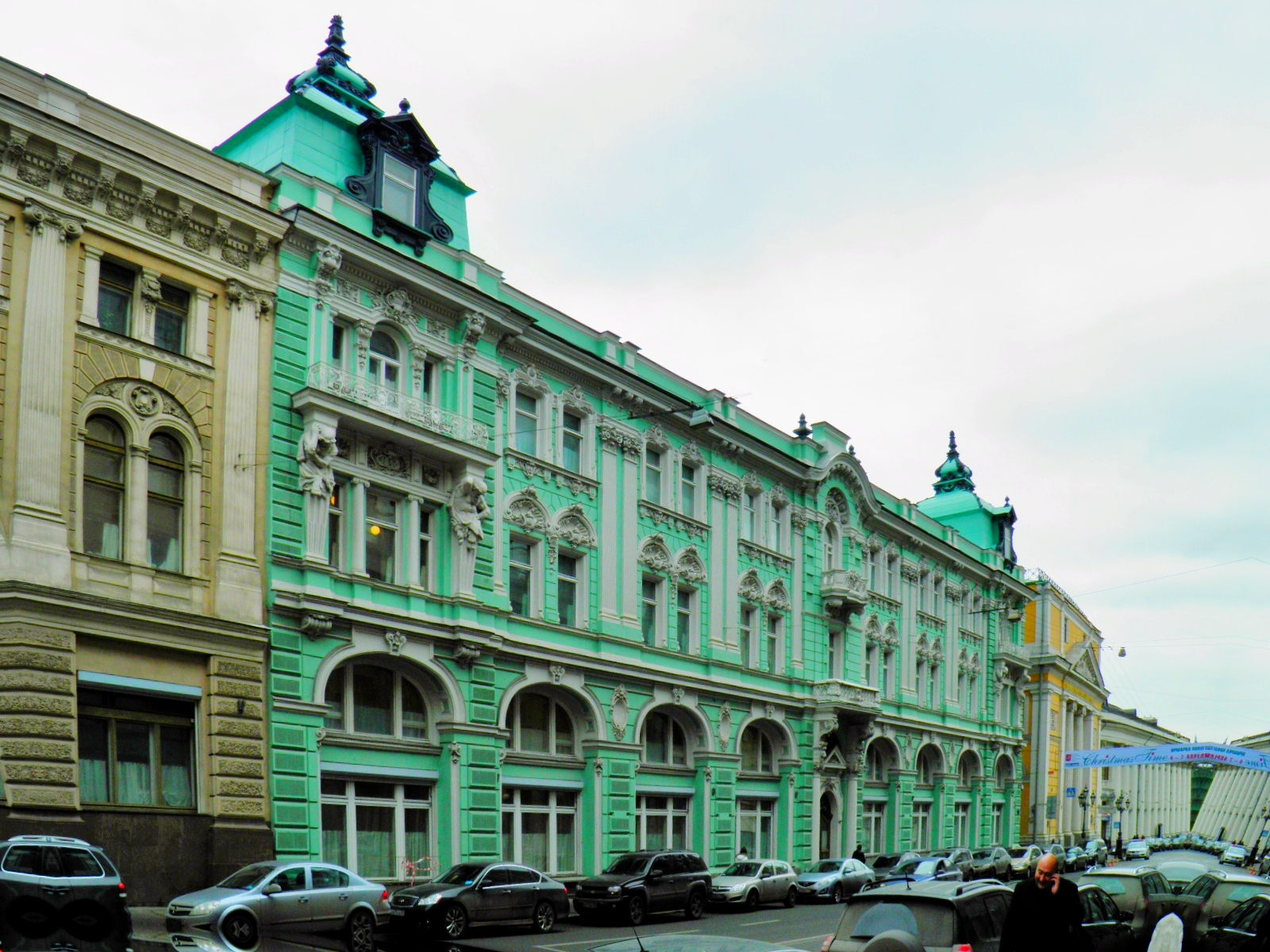
Former branch building in Moscow, Ilyinka 8

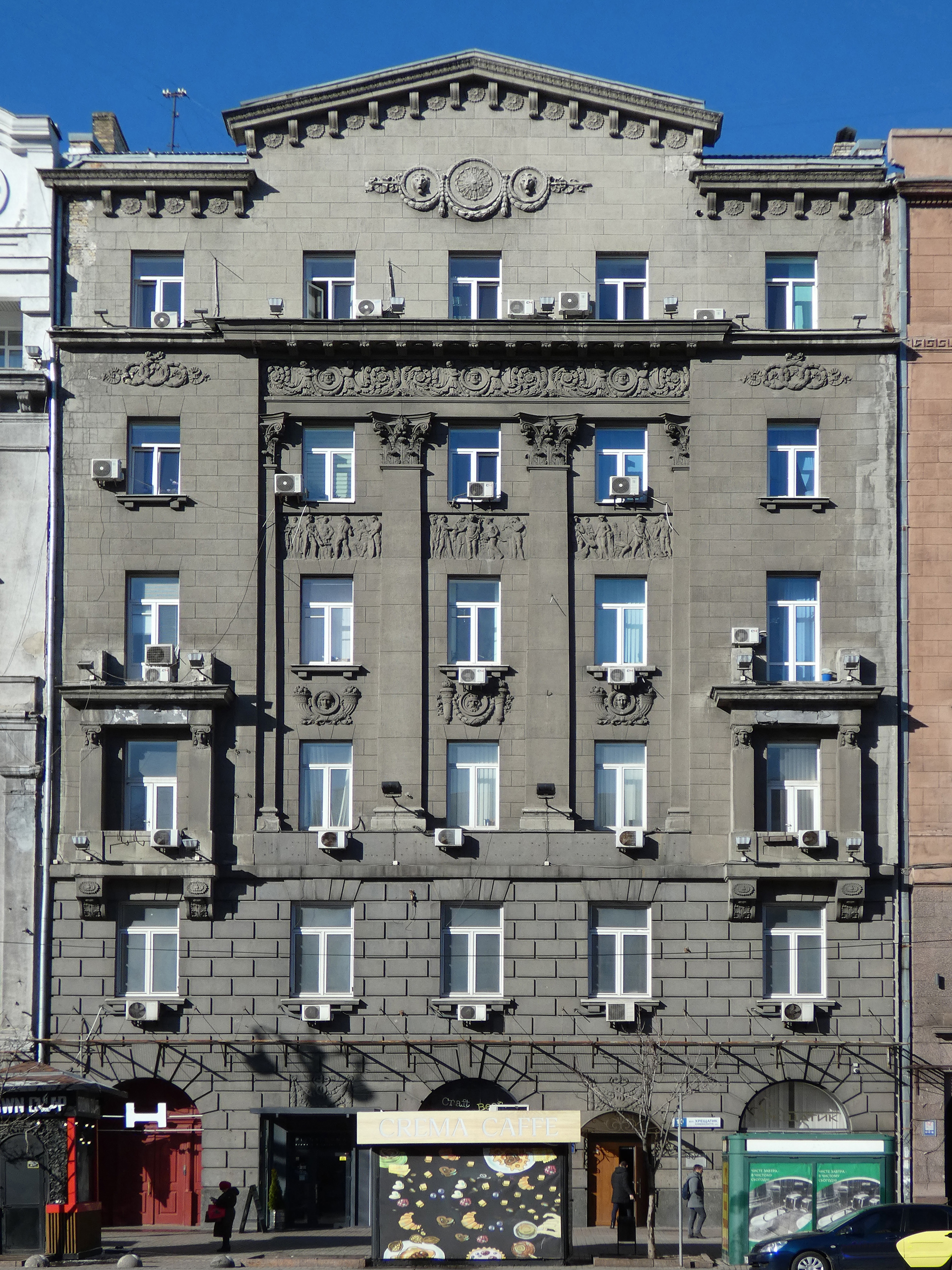
Former branch building in Kyiv, Khreshchatyk 10

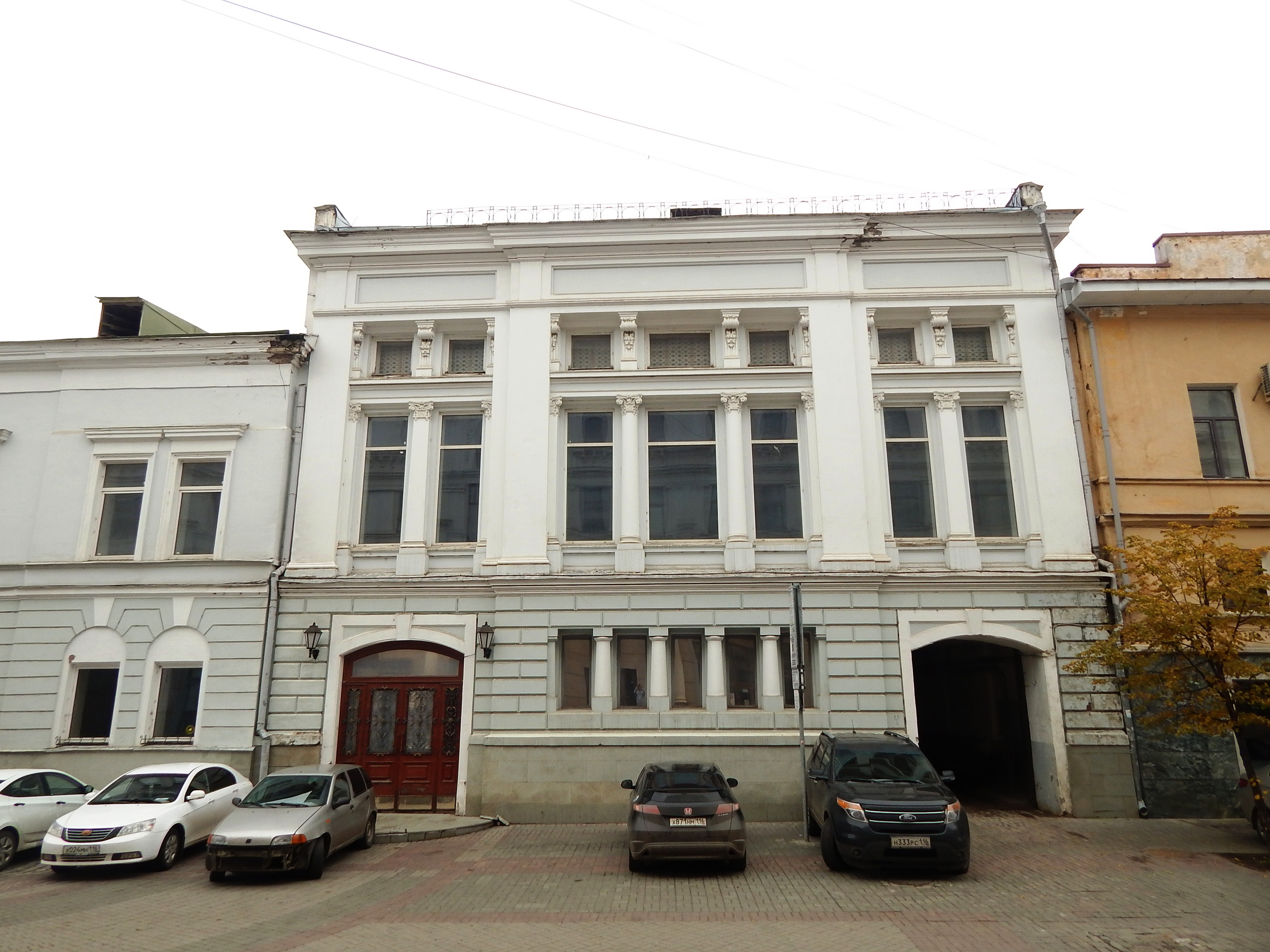
Former branch building in Kazan

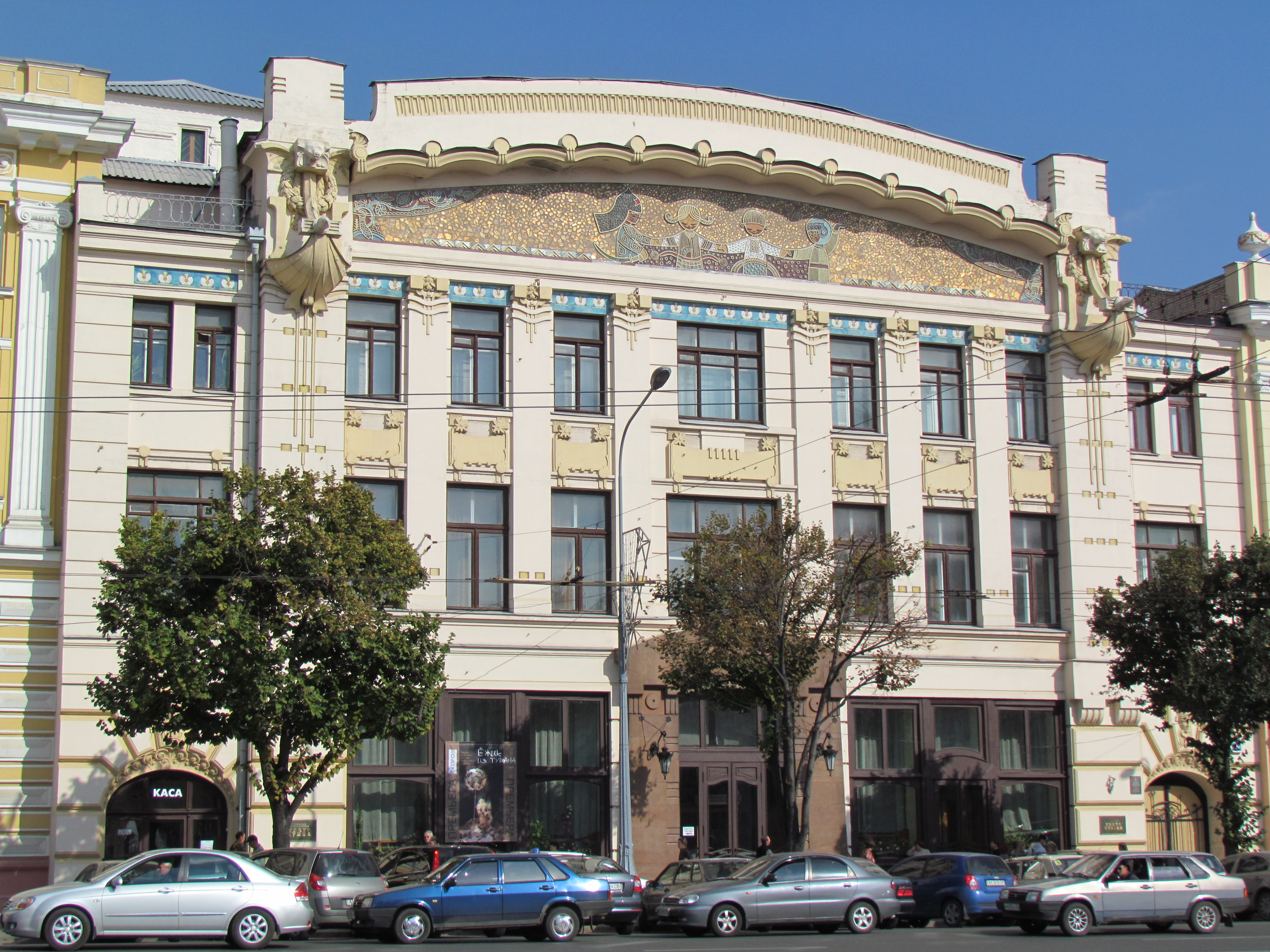
Former branch building in Kharkiv, Constitution Square 24

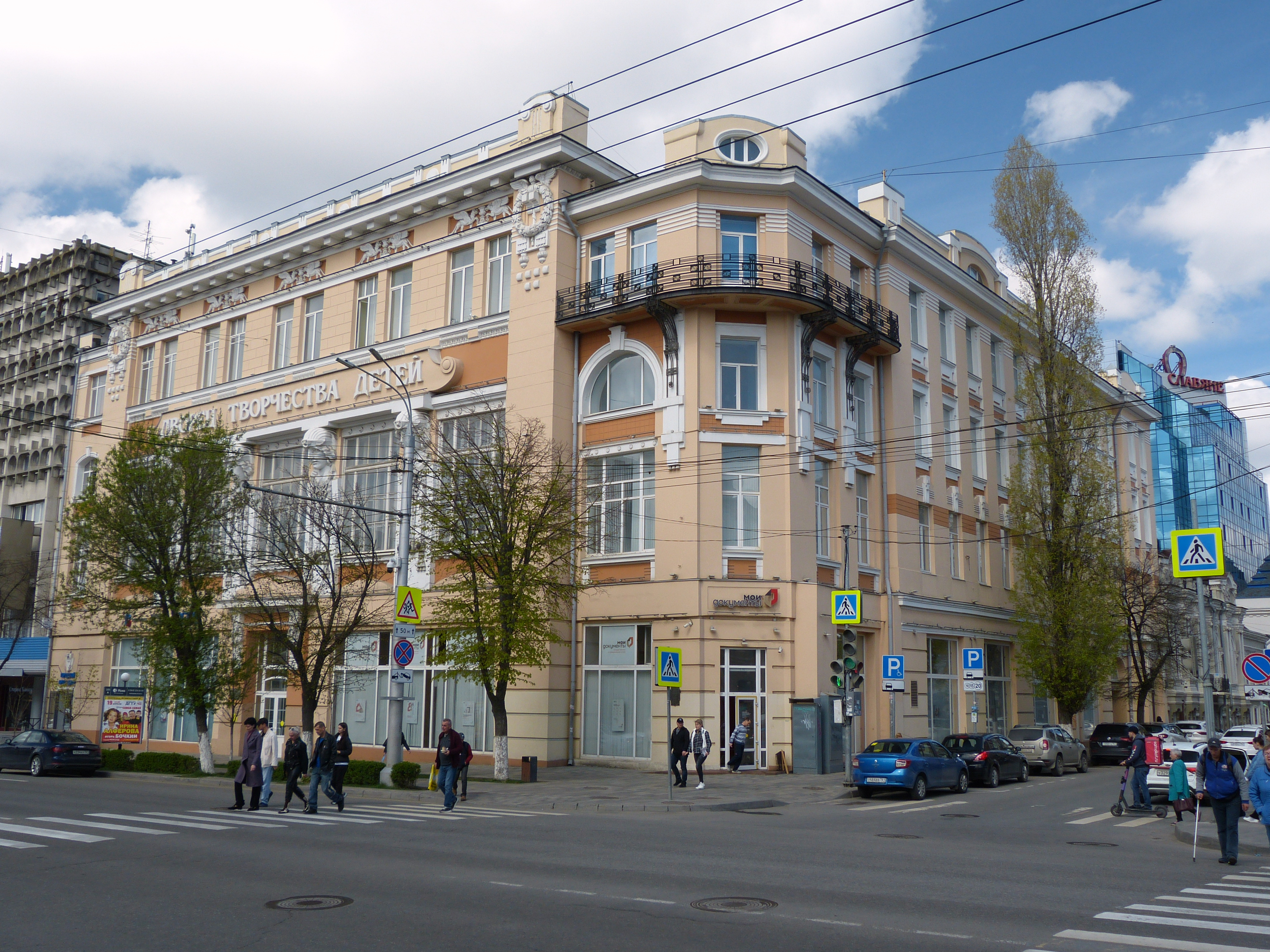
Former branch building in Rostov-on-Don

== See also ==
- Saint Petersburg International Commercial Bank
- Azov-Don Commercial Bank
- Russo-Asiatic Bank
- Russian Bank for Foreign Trade
- Moscow Merchant Bank
