= Moscow Merchant Bank =

Former bank in Russia

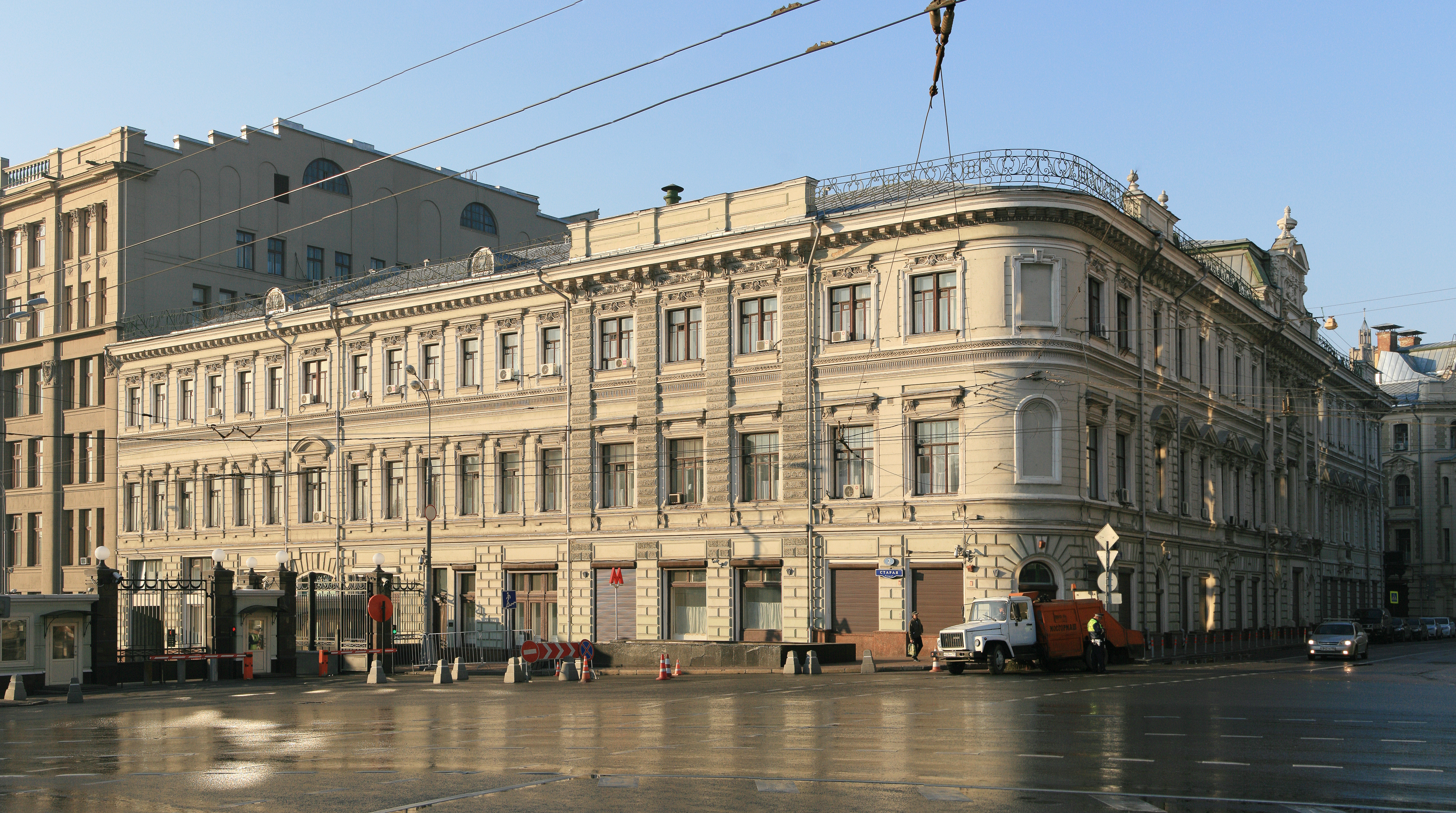
Former head office in Moscow, corner of Staraya Square and Ilyinka Street

The Moscow Merchant Bank (Russian: Московский купеческий банк) was a major bank in the Russian Empire, founded in 1866. In late 1917 following the Russian Revolution, like all other commercial banks in Russia, it was absorbed into the State Bank with no compensation to its shareholders.

== Overview ==
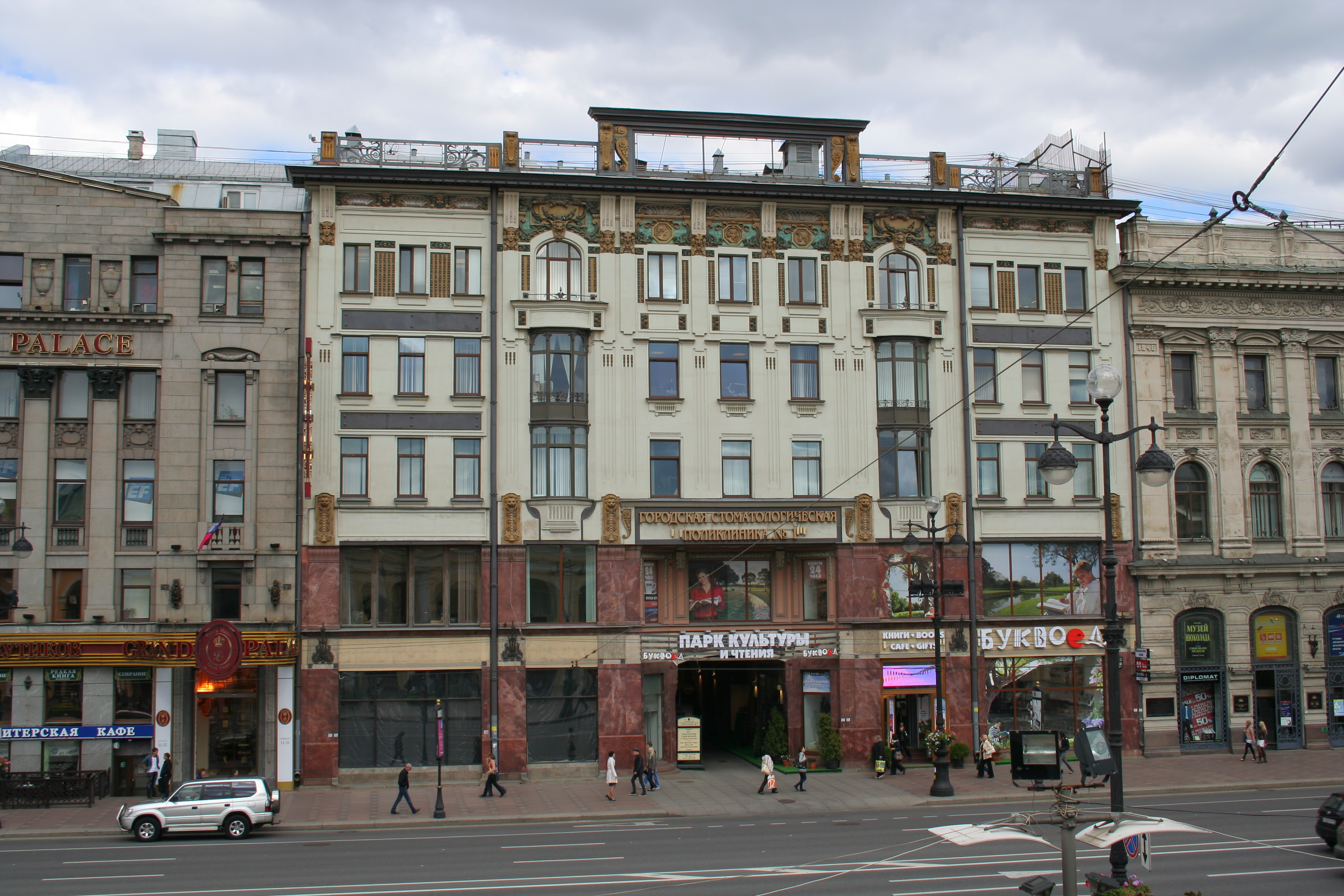
Former Saint-Petersburg branch building at Nevsky Prospect 46

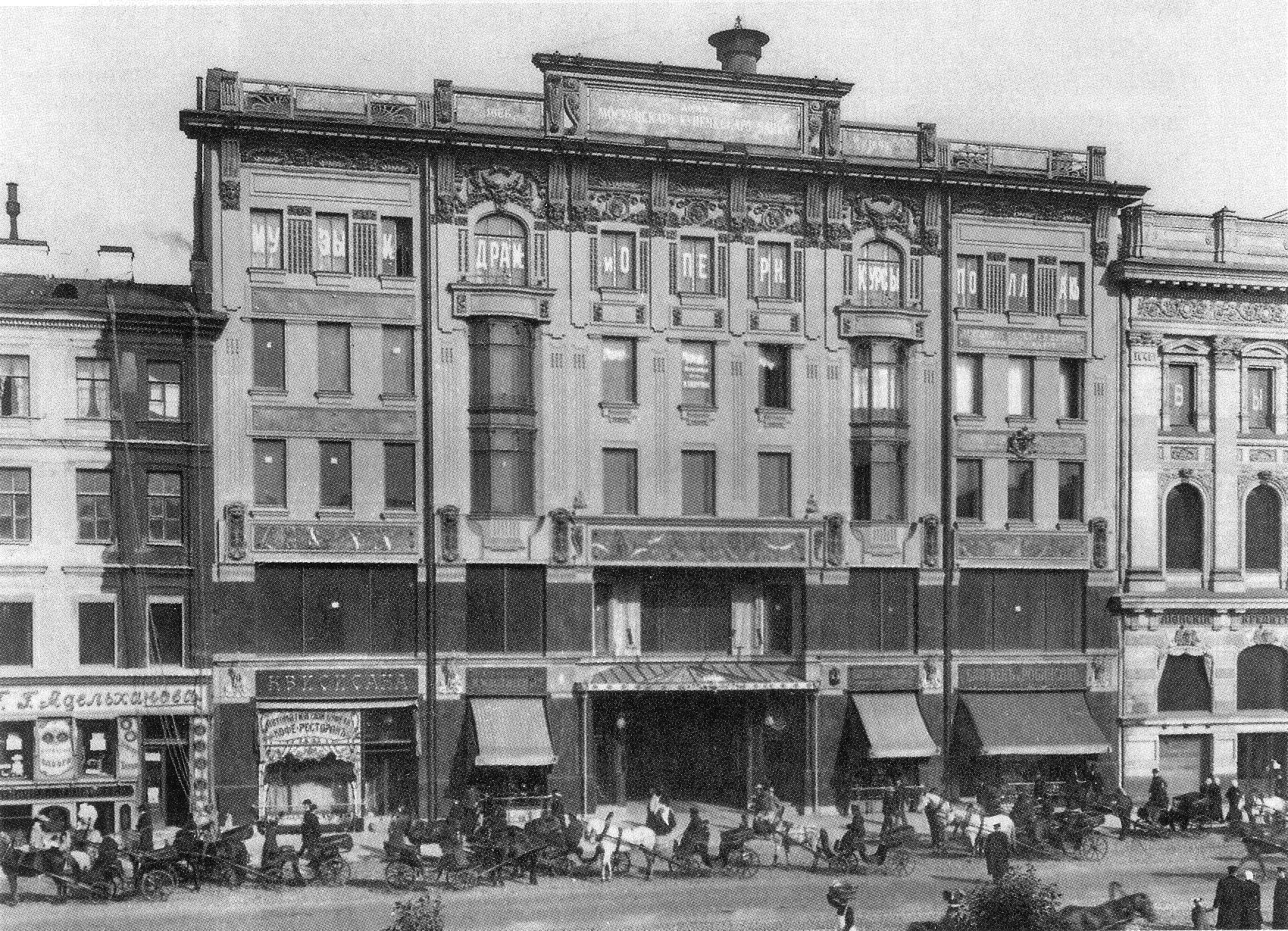
The Saint-Petersburg branch in 1903

The bank was founded in 1866 in Moscow in the form of a stock partnership by 77 local entrepreneurs led by Ivan A. Lyamin, who became its chairman. The bank's charter was approved by Alexander II on 1 June 1866. The initial share capital was 1.26 million rubles.

The bank financed mainly textile enterprises in the Central Industrial Region and, in the late 19th century, was for some time the second largest in assets among private-sector banks in Russia. At the start of the 20th century it was still third-largest, and the largest one not headquartered in Saint Petersburg.

== See also ==
- Pavel Tretyakov
- Saint Petersburg International Commercial Bank
- Azov-Don Commercial Bank
- Russo-Asiatic Bank
- Russian Bank for Foreign Trade
- Volga-Kama Commercial Bank
