= Saint Petersburg International Commercial Bank =

Former bank in Russia

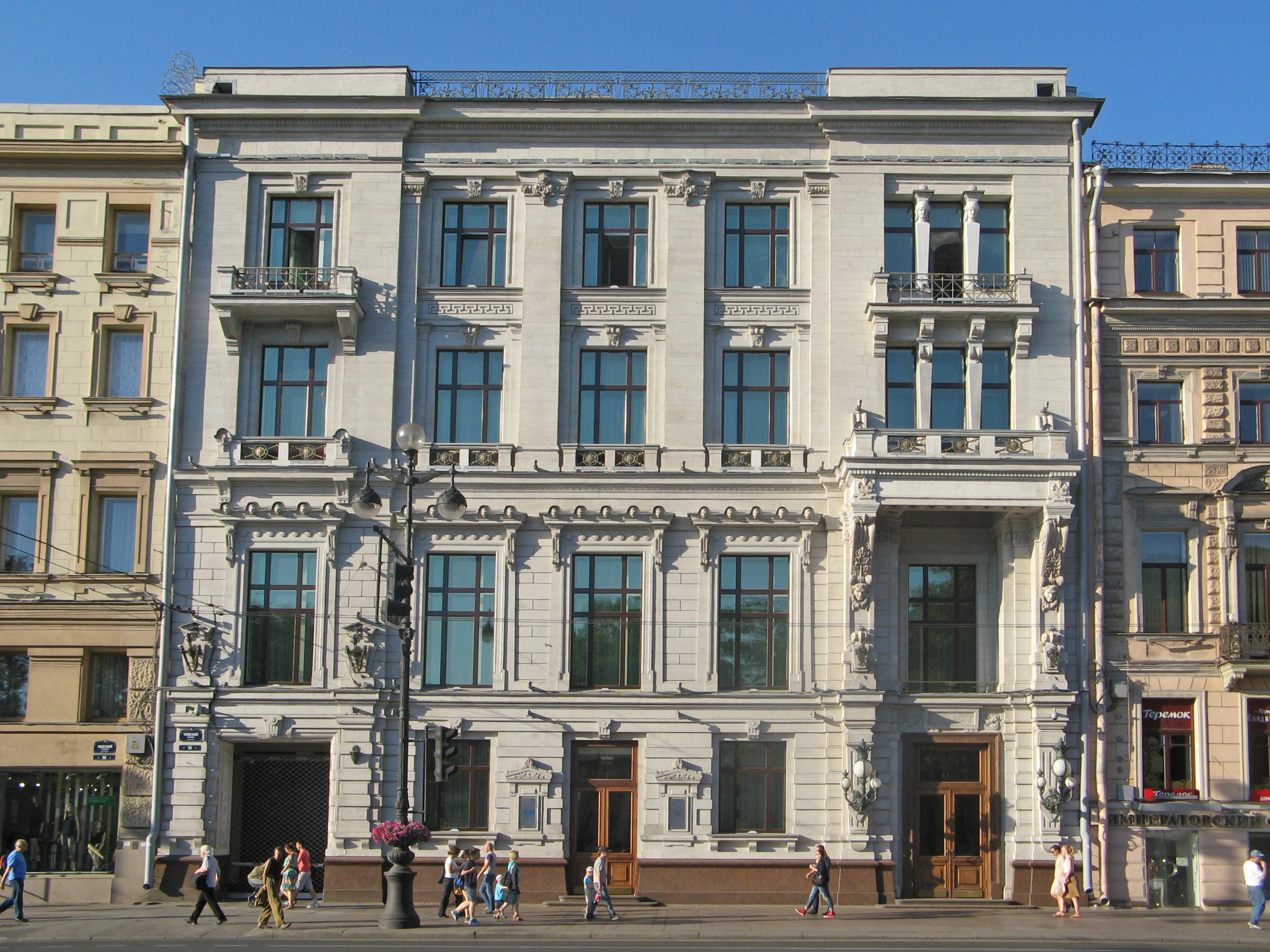
Former head office at Nevsky Prospect 58 in Saint Petersburg

The Saint Petersburg International Commercial Bank (Russian: Санкт-Петербургский международный коммерческий банк) was a major bank in the Russian Empire, founded in 1869 in Saint Petersburg. By the start of the 20th century it was Russia's second private-sector bank by assets, behind the Volga-Kama Commercial Bank, and by 1914 it still held that rank behind the Russo-Asiatic Bank. In late 1917 following the Russian Revolution, like all other commercial banks in Russia, it was absorbed into the State Bank with no compensation to its shareholders.

== Overview ==
The bank's charter was approved by Alexander II on 9 June 1869. The bank's fixed capital was initially determined at 5 million rubles and was distributed into 20 thousand shares of 250 rubles each. It was initially backed by German investors, especially the Berlin-based Disconto-Gesellschaft.

In 1896, the International Commercial Bank became the largest shareholder of the newly established Russo-Chinese Bank, with 15.3 percent of the initial capital. It had close links with Russia's military-industrial complex and controlled over 50 companies in 1914, including rail carriers, industrial enterprises, and insurance companies.

The bank was initially located at 6, Angliyskaya Embankment. In 1898, the bank moved to a new purpose-built head office at 58 Nevsky Prospekt on a design by architect Stanislas A. Brzhozovsky. The latter property was expanded in 1912 with an additional building facing Ekaterininskaya Street.

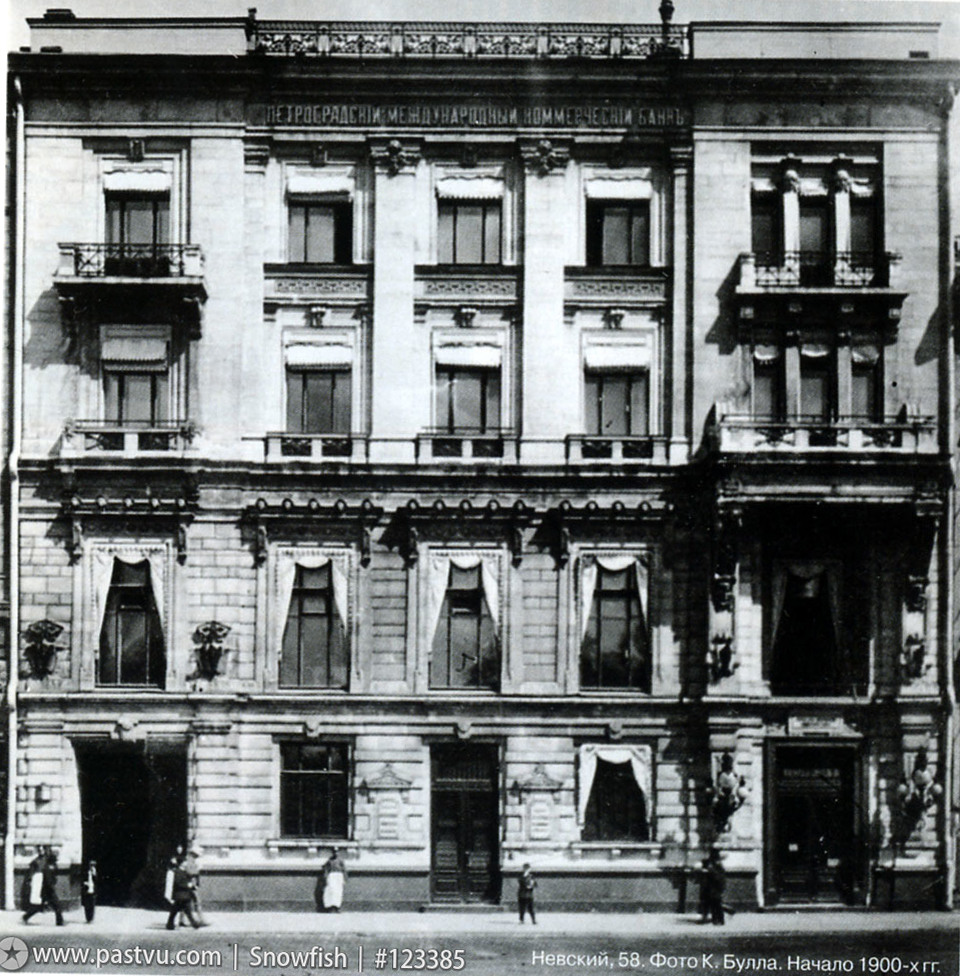
The bank's head office Saint Petersburg head office in 1915

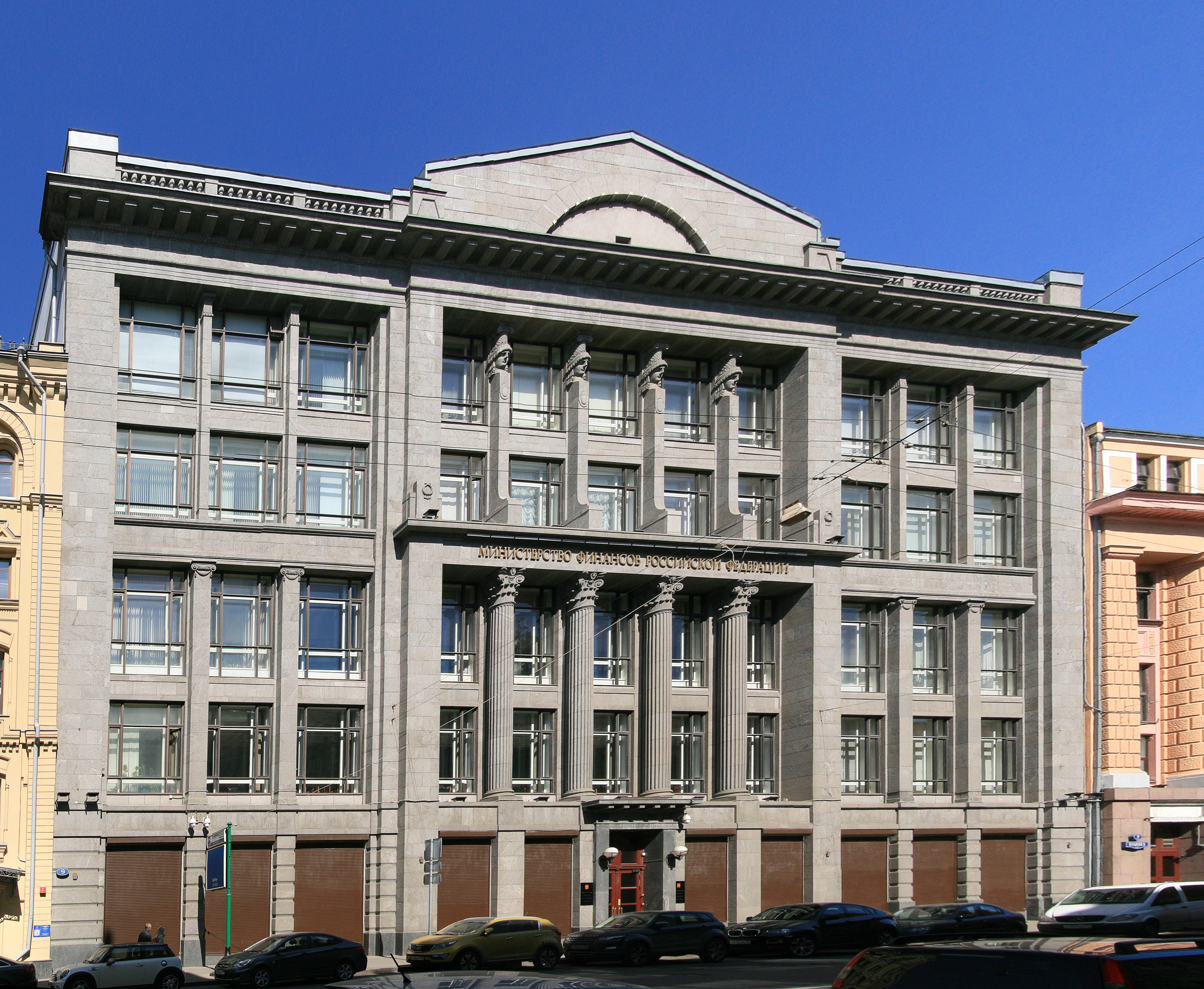
Former branch building in Moscow, Ilyinka 9

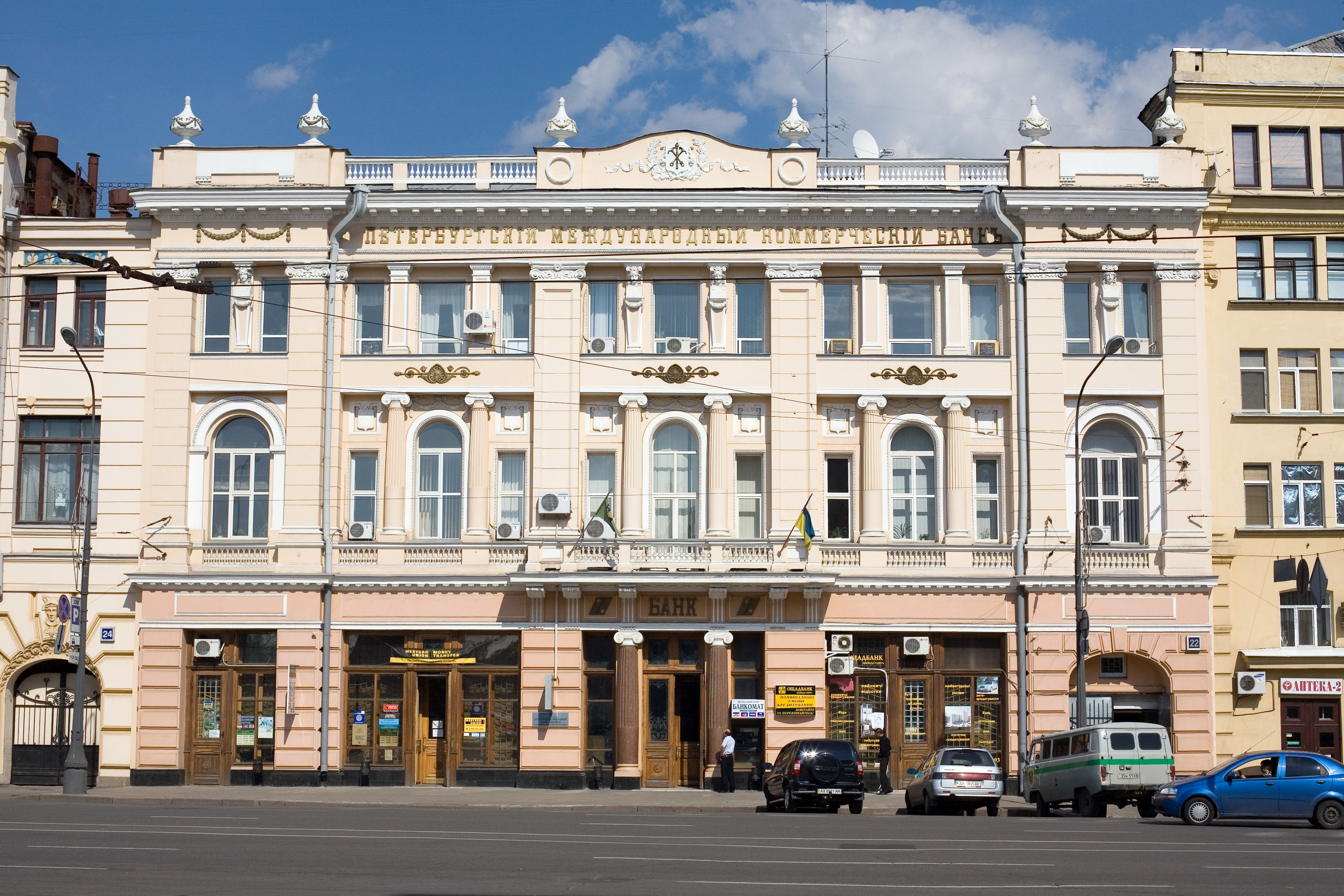
Former building in Kharkiv, Constitution Square 22

== See also ==
- Volga-Kama Commercial Bank
- Azov-Don Commercial Bank
- Russo-Asiatic Bank
- Russian Bank for Foreign Trade
- Moscow Merchant Bank
