= Romanovo =

Romanovo (Russian: Рома́ново) is the name of several rural localities in Russia.

== Altai Krai ==
As of 2010, four rural localities in Altai Krai bear this name:

- Romanovo, Kosikhinsky District, Altai Krai, a selo in Kontoshinsky Selsoviet of Kosikhinsky District
- Romanovo, Pankrushikhinsky District, Altai Krai, a selo in Romanovsky Selsoviet of Pankrushikhinsky District
- Romanovo, Romanovsky District, Altai Krai, a selo in Romanovsky Selsoviet of Romanovsky District
- Romanovo, Ust-Pristansky District, Altai Krai, a selo in Brusentsevsky Selsoviet of Ust-Pristansky District

== Arkhangelsk Oblast ==
As of 2010, one rural locality in Arkhangelsk Oblast bears this name:

- Romanovo, Arkhangelsk Oblast, a village in Usachevsky Selsoviet of Kargopolsky District

== Republic of Buryatia ==
As of 2010, one rural locality in the Republic of Buryatia bears this name:

- Romanovo, Republic of Buryatia, a selo in Krasnoyarsky Selsoviet of Kabansky District

== Ivanovo Oblast ==
As of 2010, four rural localities in Ivanovo Oblast bear this name:

- Romanovo, Kineshemsky District, Ivanovo Oblast, a village in Kineshemsky District
- Romanovo, Pestyakovsky District, Ivanovo Oblast, a village in Pestyakovsky District
- Romanovo, Rodnikovsky District, Ivanovo Oblast, a village in Rodnikovsky District
- Romanovo, Yuryevetsky District, Ivanovo Oblast, a village in Yuryevetsky District

== Kaliningrad Oblast ==
As of 2010, one rural locality in Kaliningrad Oblast bears this name:

- Romanovo, Kaliningrad Oblast, a settlement in Kovrovsky Rural Okrug of Zelenogradsky District

== Kaluga Oblast ==
As of 2010, one rural locality in Kaluga Oblast bears this name:

- Romanovo, Kaluga Oblast, a village in Medynsky District

== Kirov Oblast ==
As of 2010, two rural localities in Kirov Oblast bear this name:

- Romanovo, Podosinovsky District, Kirov Oblast, a village in Utmanovsky Rural Okrug of Podosinovsky District
- Romanovo, Verkhnekamsky District, Kirov Oblast, a village in Kaysky Rural Okrug of Verkhnekamsky District

== Kostroma Oblast ==
As of 2010, two rural localities in Kostroma Oblast bear this name:

- Romanovo, Antropovsky District, Kostroma Oblast, a village in Palkinskoye Settlement of Antropovsky District
- Romanovo, Sudislavsky District, Kostroma Oblast, a village in Raslovskoye Settlement of Sudislavsky District

== Kurgan Oblast ==
As of 2010, one rural locality in Kurgan Oblast bears this name:

- Romanovo, Kurgan Oblast, a village in Pishchalsky Selsoviet of Polovinsky District

== Kursk Oblast ==
As of 2010, two rural localities in Kursk Oblast bear this name:

- Romanovo, Khomutovsky District, Kursk Oblast, a selo in Romanovsky Selsoviet of Khomutovsky District
- Romanovo, Rylsky District, Kursk Oblast, a village in Nekrasovsky Selsoviet of Rylsky District

== Lipetsk Oblast ==
As of 2010, one rural locality in Lipetsk Oblast bears this name:

- Romanovo, Lipetsk Oblast, a selo in Olkhovsky Selsoviet of Lebedyansky District

== Moscow Oblast ==
As of 2010, one rural locality in Moscow Oblast bears this name:

- Romanovo, Moscow Oblast, a village in Ateptsevskoye Rural Settlement of Naro-Fominsky District

== Nizhny Novgorod Oblast ==
As of 2010, three rural localities in Nizhny Novgorod Oblast bear this name:

- Romanovo, Chkalovsky District, Nizhny Novgorod Oblast, a village in Purekhovsky Selsoviet of Chkalovsky District
- Romanovo, Gorodetsky District, Nizhny Novgorod Oblast, a village in Kovriginsky Selsoviet of Gorodetsky District
- Romanovo, Koverninsky District, Nizhny Novgorod Oblast, a village in Bolshemostovsky Selsoviet of Koverninsky District

== Novosibirsk Oblast ==
As of 2010, one rural locality in Novosibirsk Oblast bears this name:

- Romanovo, Novosibirsk Oblast, a selo in Cherepanovsky District

== Perm Krai ==
As of 2010, two rural localities in Perm Krai bear this name:

- Romanovo, Ilyinsky District, Perm Krai, a village in Ilyinsky District
- Romanovo, Usolsky District, Perm Krai, a selo in Usolsky District

== Pskov Oblast ==
As of 2010, four rural localities in Pskov Oblast bear this name:

- Romanovo, Bezhanitsky District, Pskov Oblast, a village in Bezhanitsky District
- Romanovo (Vorontsovskaya Rural Settlement), Ostrovsky District, Pskov Oblast, a village in Ostrovsky District; municipally, a part of Vorontsovskaya Rural Settlement of that district
- Romanovo (Volkovskaya Rural Settlement), Ostrovsky District, Pskov Oblast, a village in Ostrovsky District; municipally, a part of Volkovskaya Rural Settlement of that district
- Romanovo, Pushkinogorsky District, Pskov Oblast, a village in Pushkinogorsky District

== Ryazan Oblast ==
As of 2010, one rural locality in Ryazan Oblast bears this name:

- Romanovo, Ryazan Oblast, a selo in Davydovsky Rural Okrug of Klepikovsky District

== Sverdlovsk Oblast ==
As of 2010, one rural locality in Sverdlovsk Oblast bears this name:

- Romanovo, Sverdlovsk Oblast, a selo in Serovsky District

== Tula Oblast ==
As of 2010, one rural locality in Tula Oblast bears this name:

- Romanovo, Tula Oblast, a selo in Krasnoyarsky Rural Okrug of Kireyevsky District

== Tver Oblast ==
As of 2010, eight rural localities in Tver Oblast bear this name:

- Romanovo, Mednovskoye Rural Settlement, Kalininsky District, Tver Oblast, a village in Mednovskoye Rural Settlement of Kalininsky District
- Romanovo, Slavnovskoye Rural Settlement, Kalininsky District, Tver Oblast, a village in Slavnovskoye Rural Settlement of Kalininsky District
- Romanovo, Kalyazinsky District, Tver Oblast, a village in Nerlskoye Rural Settlement of Kalyazinsky District
- Romanovo, Kimrsky District, Tver Oblast, a village in Neklyudovskoye Rural Settlement of Kimrsky District
- Romanovo, Oleninsky District, Tver Oblast, a village in Gusevskoye Rural Settlement of Oleninsky District
- Romanovo, Staritsky District, Tver Oblast, a village in Stepurinskoye Rural Settlement of Staritsky District
- Romanovo, Toropetsky District, Tver Oblast, a village in Ploskoshskoye Rural Settlement of Toropetsky District
- Romanovo, Zapadnodvinsky District, Tver Oblast, a village in Starotoropskoye Rural Settlement of Zapadnodvinsky District

== Udmurt Republic ==
As of 2010, one rural locality in the Udmurt Republic bears this name:

- Romanovo, Udmurt Republic, a village in Bolgurinsky Selsoviet of Votkinsky District

== Vladimir Oblast ==
As of 2010, two rural localities in Vladimir Oblast bear this name:

- Romanovo, Alexandrovsky District, Vladimir Oblast, a village in Alexandrovsky District
- Romanovo, Suzdalsky District, Vladimir Oblast, a selo in Suzdalsky District

== Vologda Oblast ==
As of 2010, four rural localities in Vologda Oblast bear this name:

- Romanovo, Musorsky Selsoviet, Cherepovetsky District, Vologda Oblast, a village in Musorsky Selsoviet of Cherepovetsky District
- Romanovo, Voskresensky Selsoviet, Cherepovetsky District, Vologda Oblast, a village in Voskresensky Selsoviet of Cherepovetsky District
- Romanovo, Novlensky Selsoviet, Vologodsky District, Vologda Oblast, a village in Novlensky Selsoviet of Vologodsky District
- Romanovo, Staroselsky Selsoviet, Vologodsky District, Vologda Oblast, a village in Staroselsky Selsoviet of Vologodsky District

== Yaroslavl Oblast ==
As of 2010, two rural localities in Yaroslavl Oblast bear this name:

- Romanovo, Perelessky Rural Okrug, Pereslavsky District, Yaroslavl Oblast, a selo in Perelessky Rural Okrug of Pereslavsky District
- Romanovo, Smolensky Rural Okrug, Pereslavsky District, Yaroslavl Oblast, a selo in Smolensky Rural Okrug of Pereslavsky District

== See also ==
- Romanov (disambiguation)
- Roman (disambiguation)
