= Belovo, Russia =

Belovo (Russian: Белово) is the name of several inhabited localities in Russia.

Urban localities

- Belovo, Kemerovo Oblast, a town in Kemerovo Oblast

Rural localities

- Belovo, Rebrikhinsky District, Altai Krai, a selo in Belovsky Selsoviet of Rebrikhinsky District of Altai Krai
- Belovo, Ust-Pristansky District, Altai Krai, a selo in Belovsky Selsoviet of Ust-Pristansky District of Altai Krai
- Belovo, Chelyabinsk Oblast, a selo in Belovsky Selsoviet of Uysky District of Chelyabinsk Oblast
- Belovo, Kaliningrad Oblast, a settlement in Slavinsky Rural Okrug of Gvardeysky District of Kaliningrad Oblast
- Belovo, Chukhlomsky District, Kostroma Oblast, a village in Chukhlomskoye Settlement of Chukhlomsky District of Kostroma Oblast
- Belovo, Nerekhtsky District, Kostroma Oblast, a village in Volzhskoye Settlement of Nerekhtsky District of Kostroma Oblast
- Belovo, Kurgan Oblast, a village in Verkhnesuyersky Selsoviet of Vargashinsky District of Kurgan Oblast
- Belovo, Nizhny Novgorod Oblast, a village in Kotelnitsky Selsoviet of Chkalovsky District of Nizhny Novgorod Oblast
- Belovo, Barabinsky District, Novosibirsk Oblast, a village in Barabinsky District, Novosibirsk Oblast
- Belovo, Iskitimsky District, Novosibirsk Oblast, a selo in Iskitimsky District, Novosibirsk Oblast
- Belovo, Vologda Oblast, a village in Vokhtogsky Selsoviet of Gryazovetsky District of Vologda Oblast
