= Volodarka, Altai Krai =

Volodarka Володарка
- Village
- Location within Altai Krai Location within Russia
- Coordinates: 52°42′N 83°37′E
- Country: Russia
- Region: Altai Krai
- District: Topchikhinsky District
- Time zone: UTC+7:00

Volodarka (Russian: Володарка) is a rural locality (a selo) and the administrative center of Volodarsky Selsoviet of Topchikhinsky District, Altai Krai, Russia. The population was 736 in 2016. There are 17 streets.

== Geography ==
Volodarka is located 54 km northwest of Topchikha (the district's administrative centre) by road. Belovo is the nearest rural locality.
