= Romanov (disambiguation) =

The House of Romanov was the second and last imperial dynasty to rule over Russia, reigning from 1613 until 1917.

Romanov may also refer to:

- Romanov (surname)
- Romanov sheep
- Romanov (vodka)
- Romanov, Volgograd Oblast, Russia
- Romanov (urban-type settlement), Ukraine

== See also ==
- Romanovo, a list of places
