= Russo-Asiatic Bank =

International bank (1910–1917)

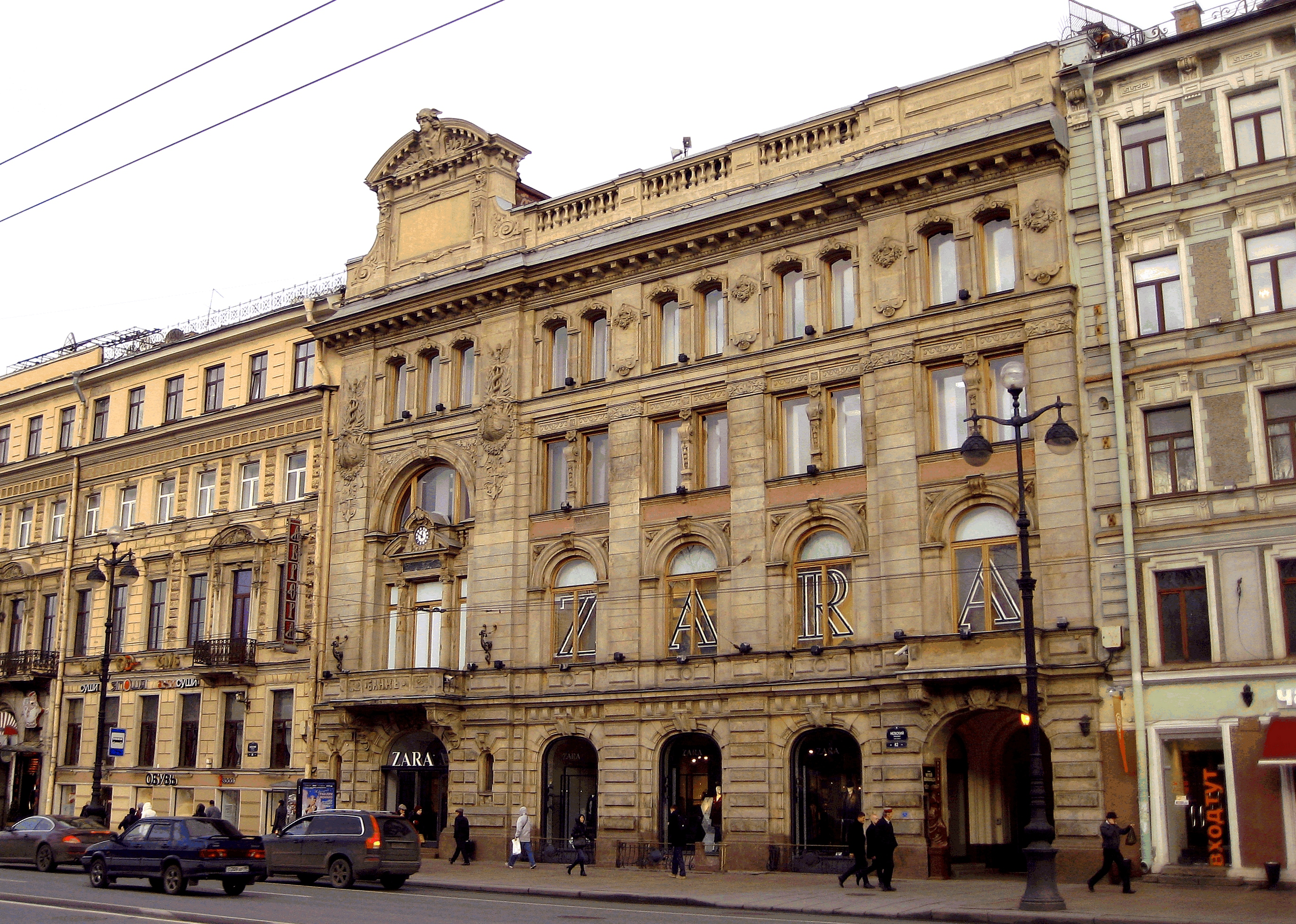
Former headquarters building of the Banque du Nord, then of the Russo-Asiatic Bank in Saint Petersburg

The Russo-Asiatic Bank (Russian: Русско-Азиатский банк, French: Banque russo-asiatique, Traditional Chinese: 俄亞銀行) was a major Russian bank between 1910 and 1917. It was formed in 1910 through the merger of the Russo-Chinese Bank, with activities in Russia, China and Central Asia, and the Banque du Nord ("Northern Bank", Russian: Северный банк), a large domestic Russian bank. By 1914, it was Russia's largest private-sector bank by total assets. In late 1917, following the Russian Revolution, like all other commercial banks in Russia, its Russian operations were absorbed into the State Bank with no compensation to its shareholders. Its activities in Europe and China lingered for a while, but were eventually liquidated in 1926.

== Banque du Nord ==
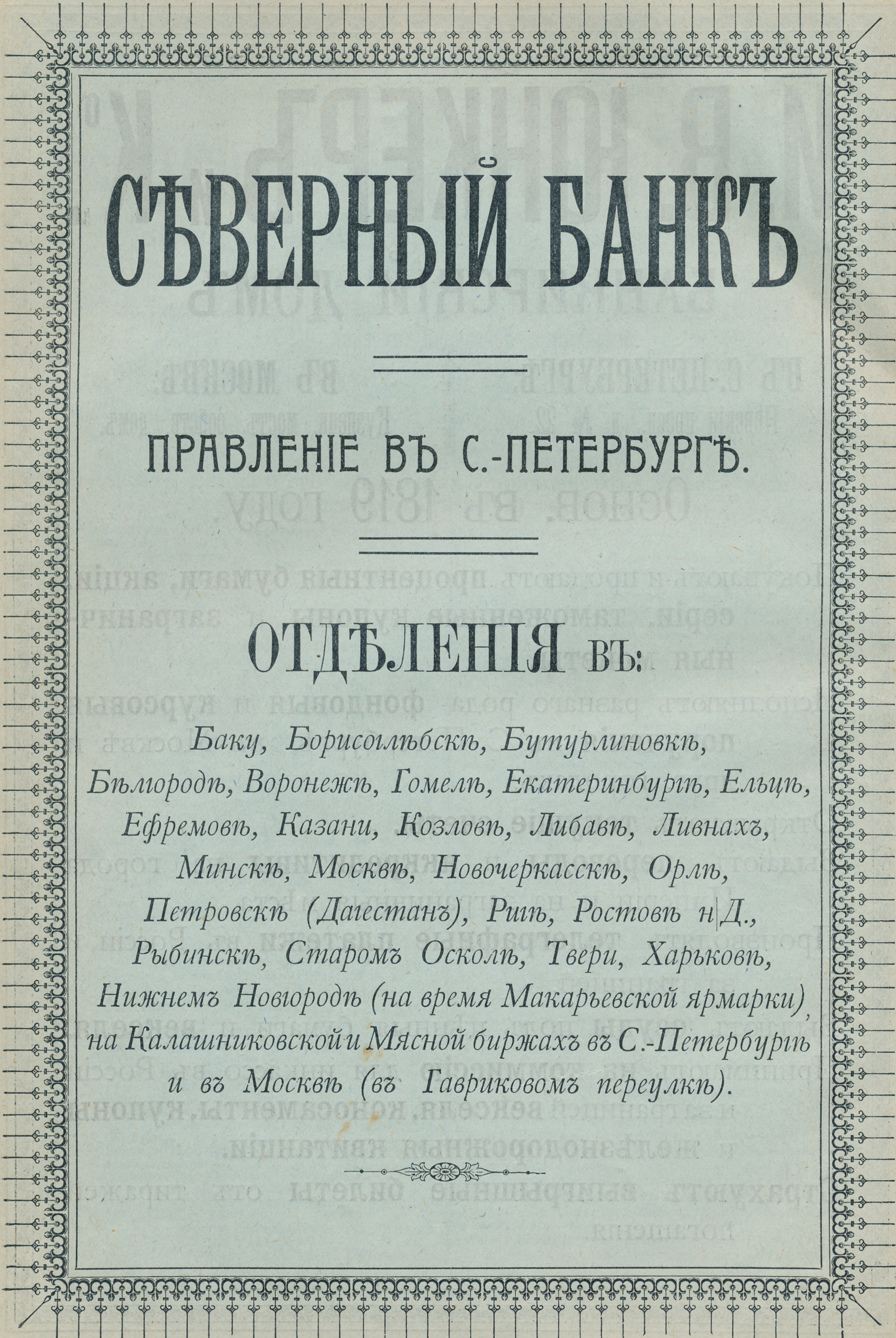
Advert for the Banque du Nord, 1907

The Banque du Nord was created by France's Société Générale bank in 1901 as a fully owned subsidiary to develop a retail and commercial banking activity in Russia in the context of an increasingly close Franco-Russian Alliance. By 1909, it had about fifty branches in Russia, including particularly active ones in Kharkiv to finance the industrial concern known as the Omnium (French: Société générale de l'industrie minière & métallurgique en Russie), and Baku to finance the booming local oil industry.

By 1907, in addition to the head office in Saint Petersburg, it had branches in Baku, Belgorod, Borisoglebsk, Buturlinovka, Gomel, Kazan, Kharkiv, Kozlov (now Michurinsk), Liepāja, Livny, Minsk, Moscow, Nizhny Novgorod (during fair), Novocherkassk, Oryol, Petrovsk-Port (now Makhachkala), Riga, Rostov-on-Don, Rybinsk, Stary Oskol, Tver, Voronezh, Yefremov, Yekaterinburg, and Yelets.

== Russo-Asiatic Bank ==
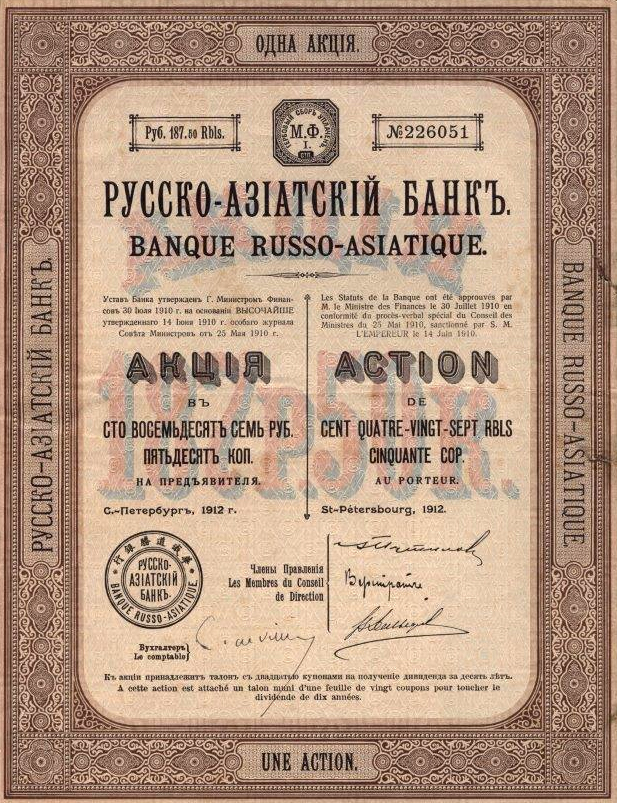
Share certificate of the Russo-Asiatic Bank, 1912

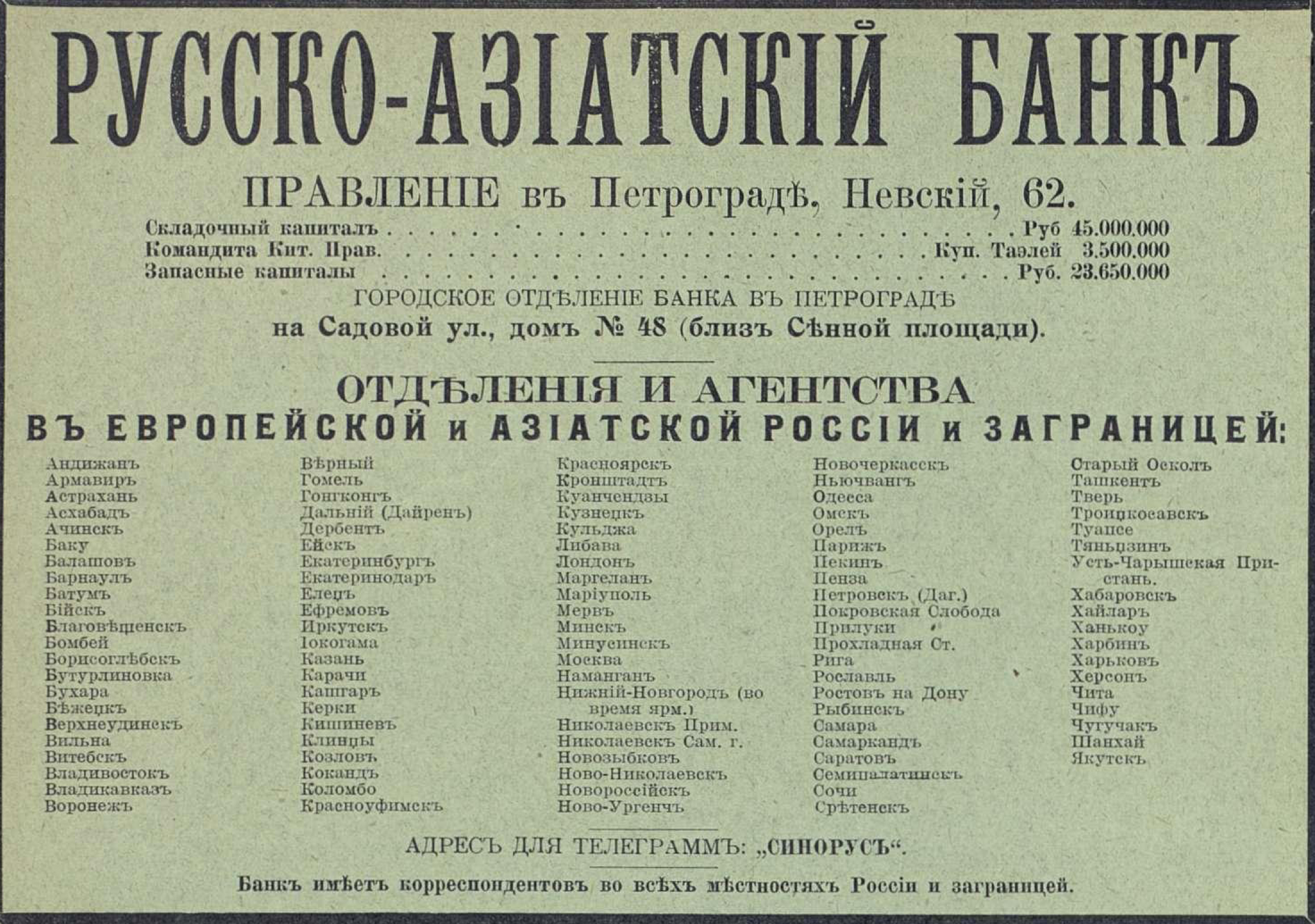
Advert for the Russo-Asiatic Bank, 1916

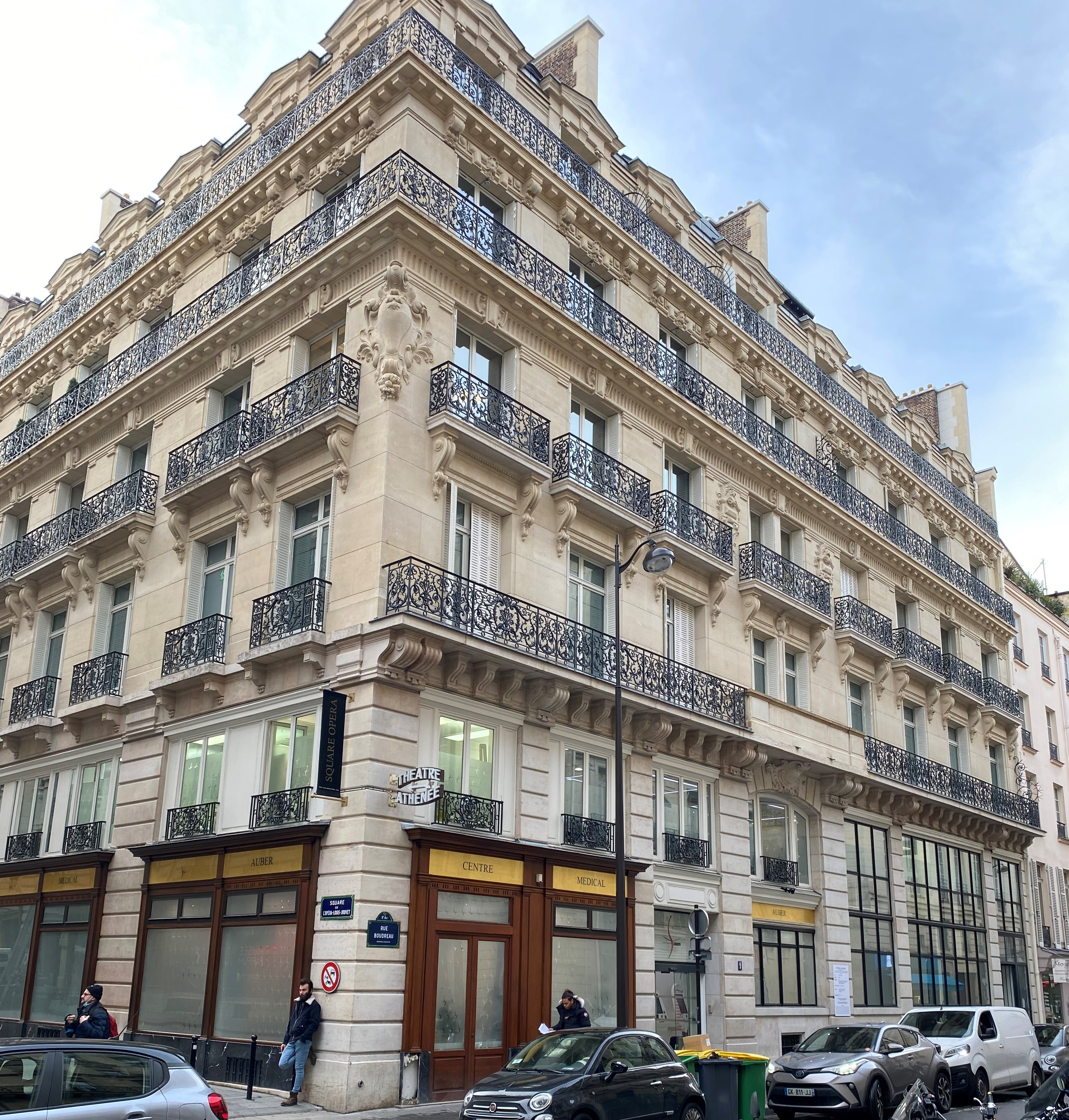
The bank's Parisian head office during its final years at 9, rue Boudreau

In 1910, the Russo-Chinese Bank and Banque du Nord merged to form the Russo-Asiatic Bank. Former French diplomat Maurice Verstraëte, who had managed the Banque du Nord since its creation, became the chief executive of the merged entity. By 1914 it was the largest Russian bank with 672 million rubles in total assets, well ahead of the Saint Petersburg International Commercial Bank which held 488 million rubles.

By 1916 it had 105 branches:

- 54 in the European and Caucasian part of the Russian Empire: Armavir, Astrakhan, Baku, Balashov, Batumi, Bezhetsk, Borisoglebsk, Buturlinovka, Chișinău, Derbent, Gomel, Kazan, Kharkiv, Kherson, Klintsy, Kozlov (now Michurinsk), Krasnoufimsk, Kronstadt, Kuznetsk, Liepāja, Mariupol, Minsk, Moscow, Nikolayevsk, Nizhny Novgorod (during fair), Novocherkassk, Novorossiysk, Novozybkov, Odessa, Oryol, Penza, Petrovsk-Port (now Makhachkala), Prokhladny Station, Pokrovskaya Sloboda (now Engels), Pryluky, Riga, Roslavl, Rostov-on-Don, Rybinsk, Samara, Saratov, Sochi, Stary Oskol, Tuapse, Tver, Vilnius, Vitebsk, Vladikavkaz, Voronezh, Yefremov, Yekaterinburg, Yekaterinodar (now Krasnodar), Yelets, and Yeysk;
- 31 in Russian Turkestan, Siberia and the Russian Far East: Achinsk, Andijan, Ashgabat, Barnaul, Biysk, Blagoveshchensk, Bukhara, Chita, Irkutsk, Kerki, Khabarovsk, Kokand, Krasnoyarsk, Margilan, Mary, Minusinsk, Namangan, Nikolayevsk-on-Amur, Novonikolayevsk (now Novosibirsk), Novy Urgench, Omsk, Samarkand, Semipalatinsk, Sretensk, Tashkent, Troitskosavsk (now Kyakhta), Verkhneudinsk (now Ulan-Ude), Ust-Charyshskaya Pristan, Verniy (now Almaty), Vladivostok, and Yakutsk;
- 14 in China: Beijing, Chefoo (now Yantai), Chuguchak (now Tacheng), Dalian, Ghulja (now Yining), Hailar, Hankou (now part of Wuhan), Harbin, Hong Kong, Kashgar, Kuanchengtze (part of Changchun), Newchwang (now Yingkou), Shanghai, and Tianjin;
- and 6 in Bombay, Colombo, Karachi, London, Paris, and Yokohama.

In November 1917, the new Soviet government nationalized all Russian banks, including the Russo-Asiatic Bank. This generated considerable legal uncertainty. The bank was technically the sole owner of the strategically important Chinese Eastern Railway, but actually held the shares as a proxy for the Russian government which had provided the capital for the railway's construction. The share certificates of the railway were deposited at the Russo-Asiatic Bank in Saint Petersburg, and thus inaccessible following the Bolshevik takeover. As a consequence, various powers claimed rights to ownership of the railway, which was the bank's foremost non-Russian asset, and the resulting confusion lasted for a number of years. In early 1918, the Chinese government, then under dominant Japanese influence, was inclined to seize the China Eastern Railway and also to stop paying Russia's share of the Boxer Indemnity for which the Russo-Asiatic Bank was the collecting agent.

In terms of governance, the bank's board had always met in Paris but its management board (Russian: правление) was located in Russia. French nationals initially held three-quarters of the bank's equity capital, but could not properly exercise their ownership rights as the bank was unable to hold a proper annual general meeting after 1917. The chairman of the management board, prominent Russian businessman Aleksei Putilov, fled Russia in November 1917, first to Manchuria, then to Shanghai and later on to Paris, where he intrigued to retain control of the bank's operations. The French government at times supported Putilov, and at other times encouraged his rivals for control of the bank's assets, with no legal clarity as to who ultimately had management rights over the bank's non-Russian operations, and also uncertainty on whether the bank might ultimately reclaim its Russian assets subject to the outcome of the Russian Civil War in which the bank kept financing various anti-Bolshevik factions. Putilov, in turn, negotiated with Japanese and American financiers to gain autonomy from his French supporters. Meanwhile, the bank had to issue new equity capital, in large part to exiled Russian subscribers, which added further confusion to its ownership and governance.

In 1919, France for a while supported plans by Russian financier Karol Jaroszyński to shore up the bank's capital in coordination with the Banque de Paris et des Pays-Bas (BPPB) and Société Générale, backing Alexander Kolchak's Russian State and its Russian Army's advance in the Urals and towards the Volga. The effort floundered after Kolchak's troops were beaten on the Red Army's Eastern Front in the summer of 1919. Another restructuring plan led by another Russian émigré financier, Procopy Petrovich Batolin, against Putilov and his French allies, similarly failed to gain traction in late 1919 and 1920 as the BPPB and Société Générale gradually lost interest.

In 1921 and 1922, Putilov ended up negotiating in secret with agents of the Soviet government, including Leonid Krasin, to recover at least some of its Russian property assets. By then, the French government was starting to consider resuming some relations with the Soviet government, though that remained a highly contentious matter of French domestic politics. In May 1924, the Chinese government reached an agreement with the Soviet government that provided for Chinese recognition of the latter and a provisional regime of management of the China Eastern Railway by the Soviet Union, putting a final end on the Russo-Asiatic Bank's claims to its ownership. On 28 October 1924, following the Cartel des Gauches's electoral victory in May, France eventually recognized the Soviet Union as well, and Krasin became its ambassador in Paris. Continuous rivalry among Russian factions, including between Putilov and Batolin, led to the failure in April 1926 of a last-ditch effort to restructure what remained of the Russo-Asiatic Bank. It was eventually placed under insolvency protection in Paris on 27 September 1926.

== Buildings ==
The bank's headquarters building in Saint Petersburg, on Nevsky Prospect 62, was reconstructed in 1896-1898 for the Saint-Petersburg-Azov Commercial Bank on a design by architect Boris Girshovich. The Banque du Nord acquired it from the ailing Azov Commercial Bank in 1901, and in 1910 it became the seat of the Russo-Asiatic Bank.

Its branch office in Paris was initially at 2, rue Le Peletier, where the Russo-Chinese was already established; it relocated around 1917 to the former seat of the Banque Française pour le Commerce et l'Industrie at 9, rue Boudreau.

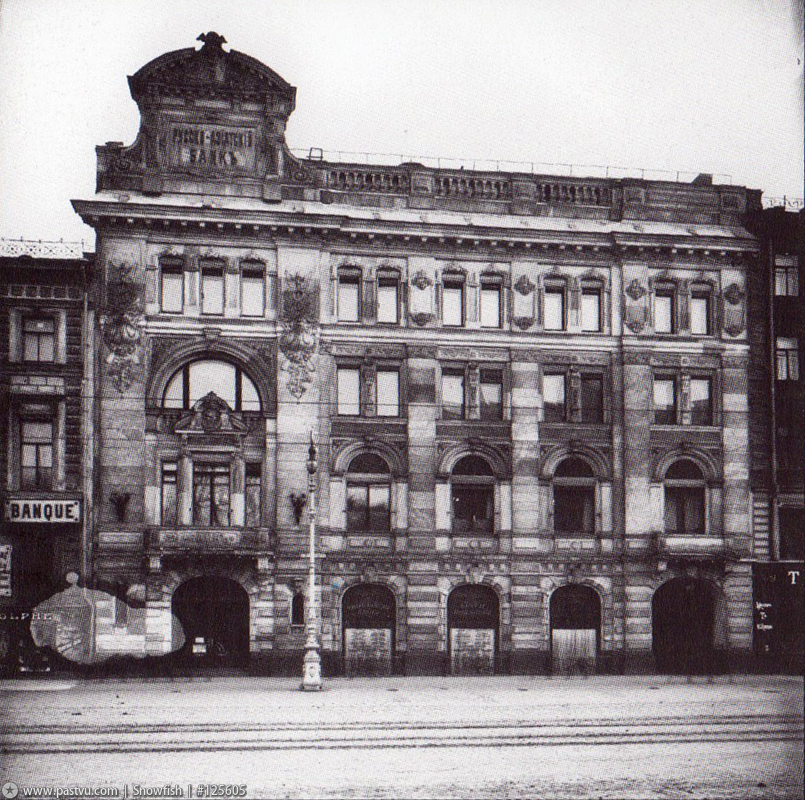
Headquarters of the Banque du Nord and then of the Russo-Asiatic Bank in Saint Petersburg, 1914

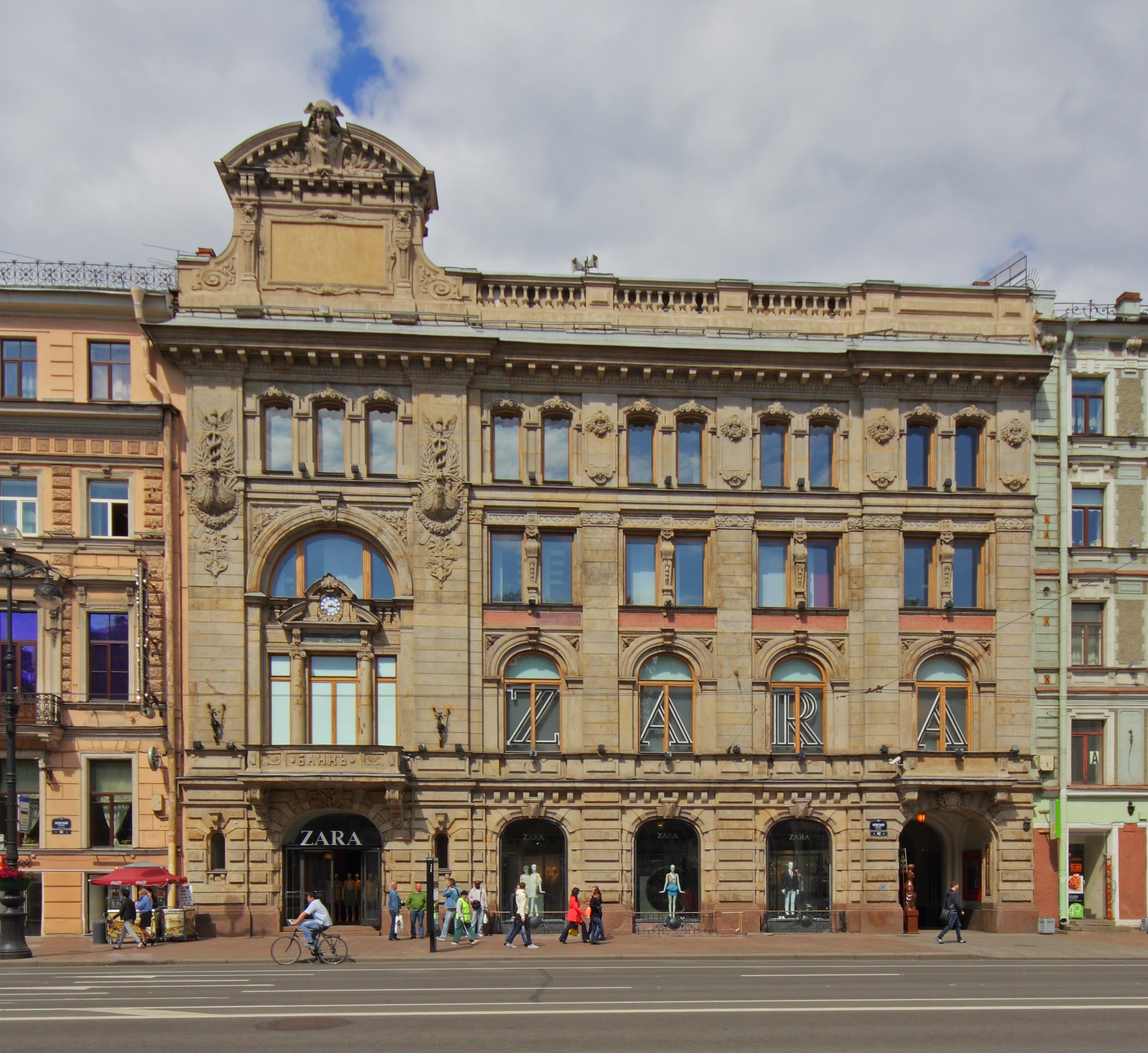
Same building in 2012, hosting a Zara outlet

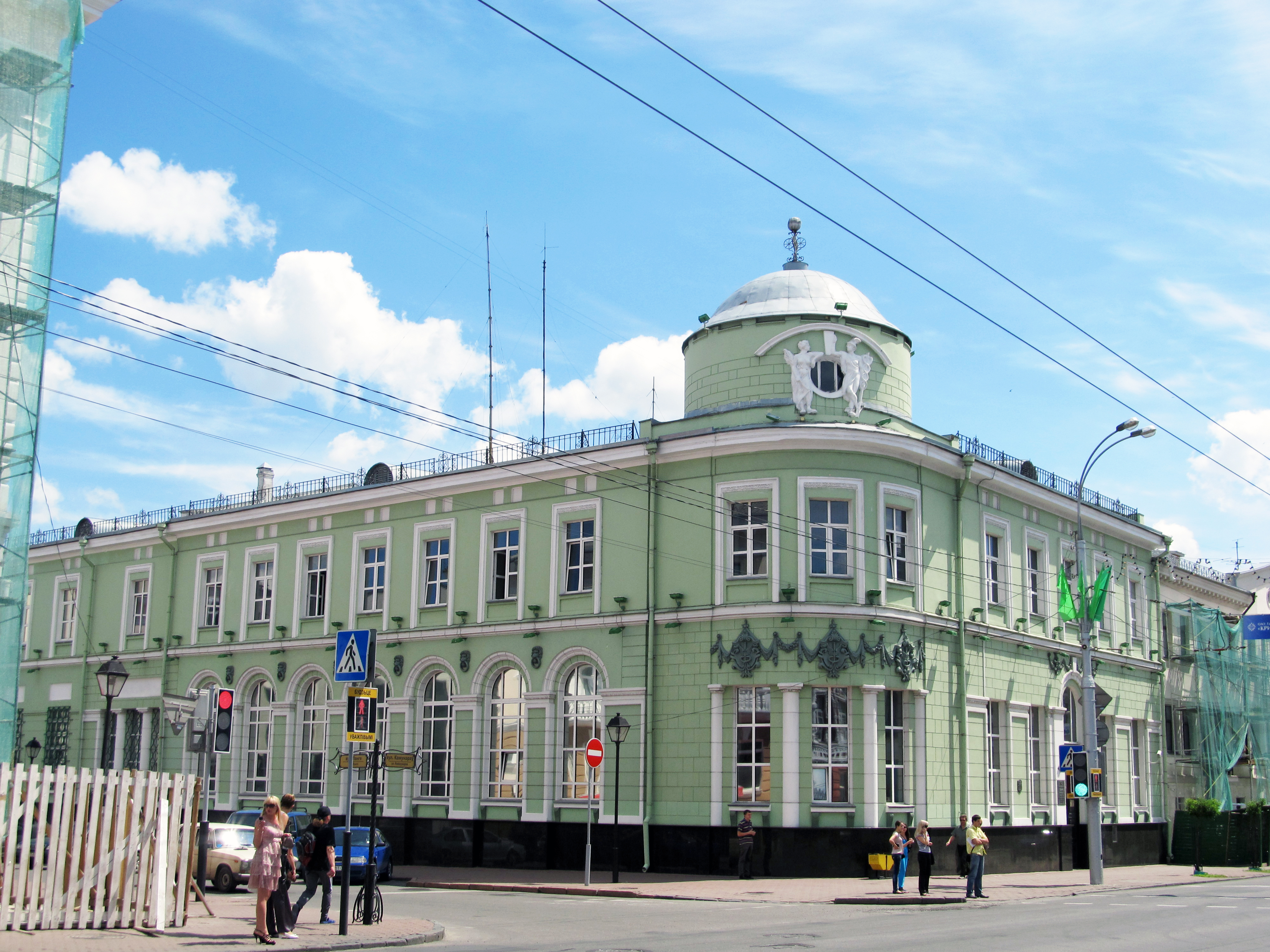
Former branch building in Gomel, 2012

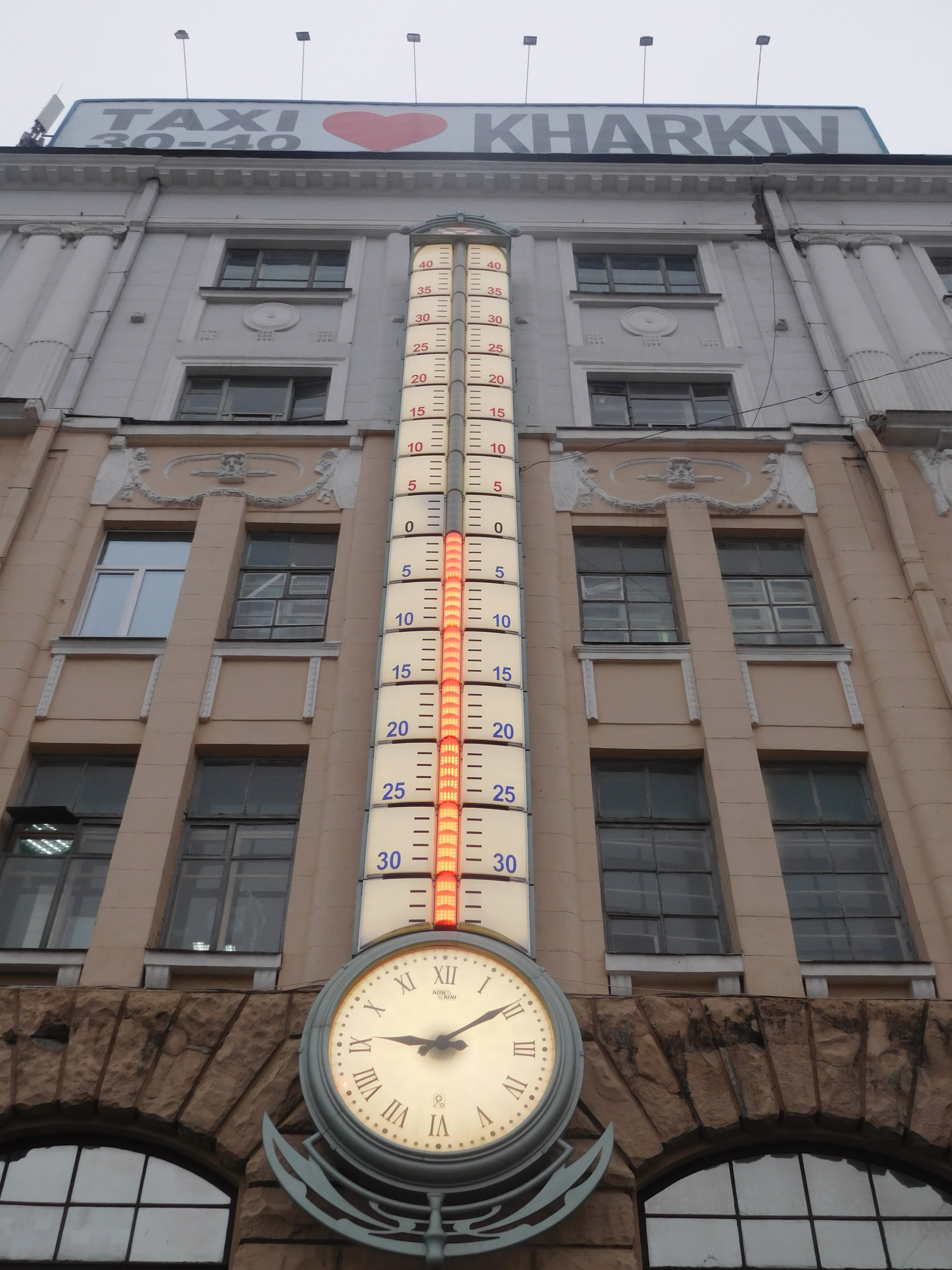
Former branch building in Kharkiv with giant thermometer installation, 2018

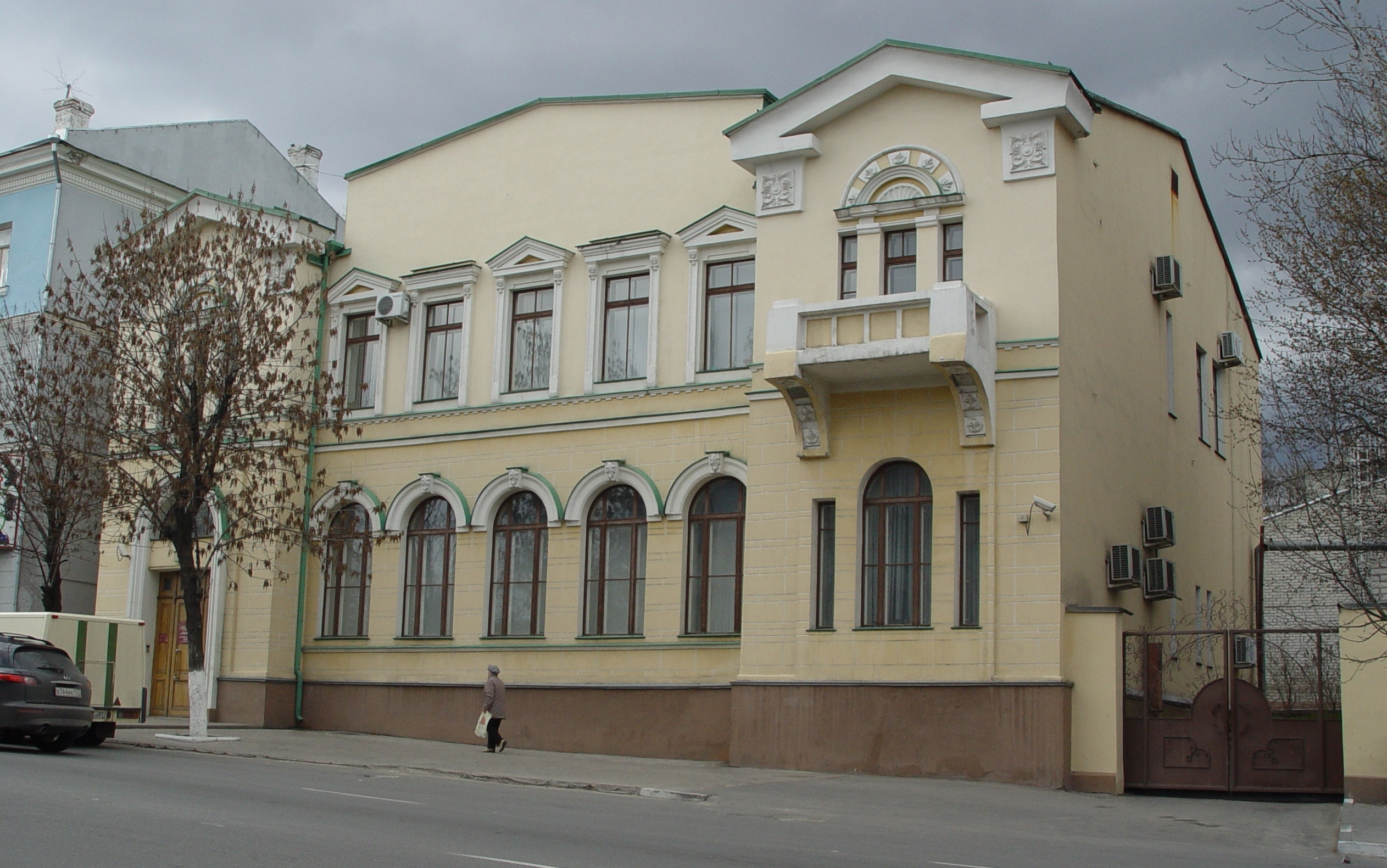
Former branch building in Stary Oskol, 2007

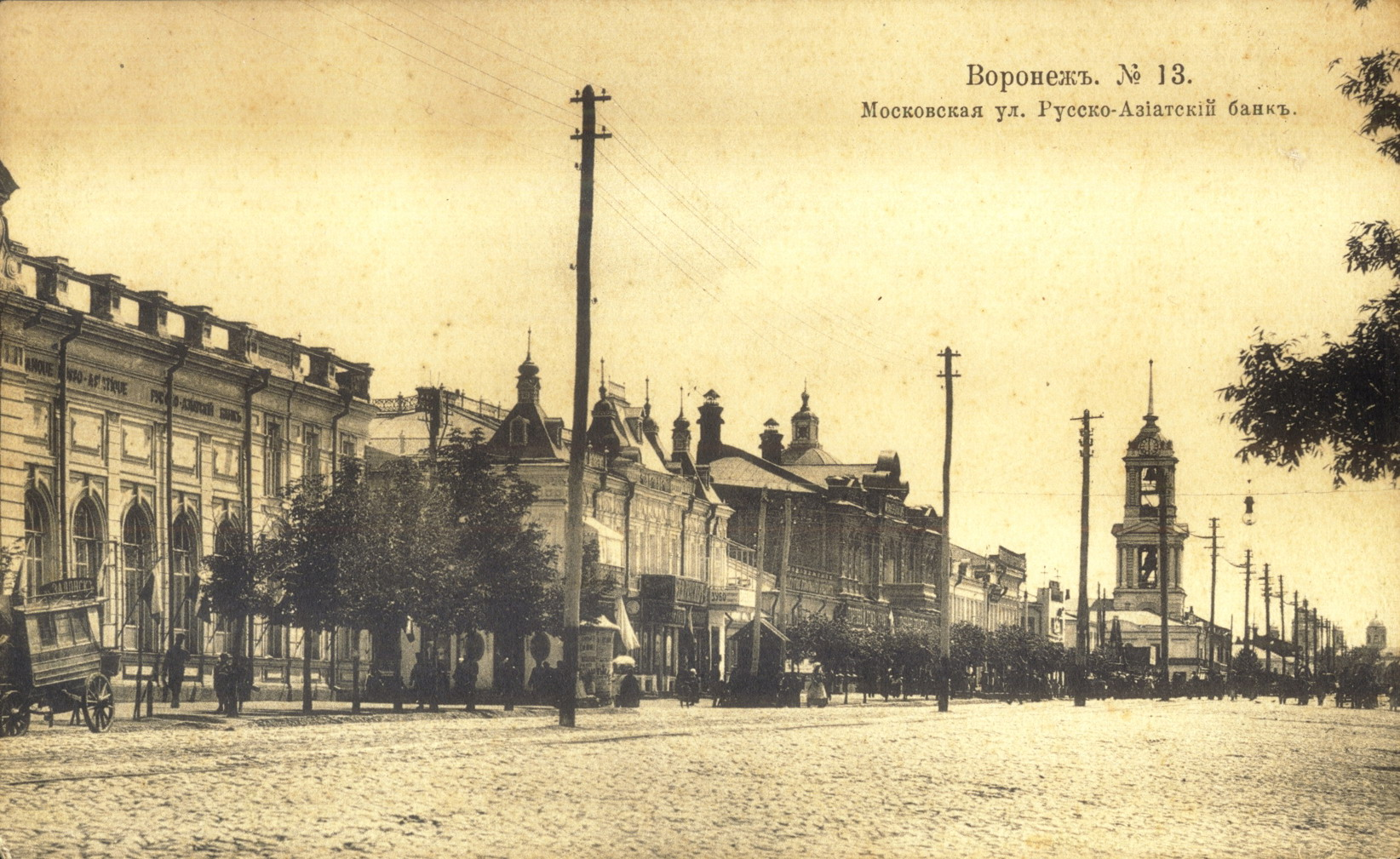
Branch building in Voronezh (left), 1910s

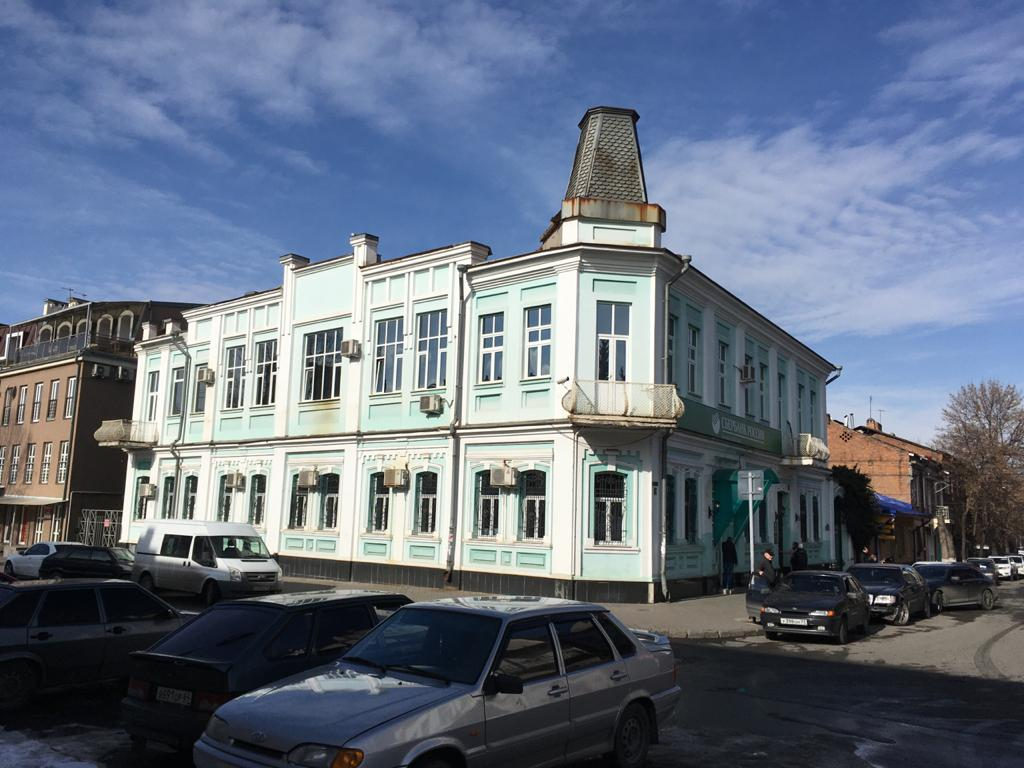
Former branch building in Vladikavkaz, 2020

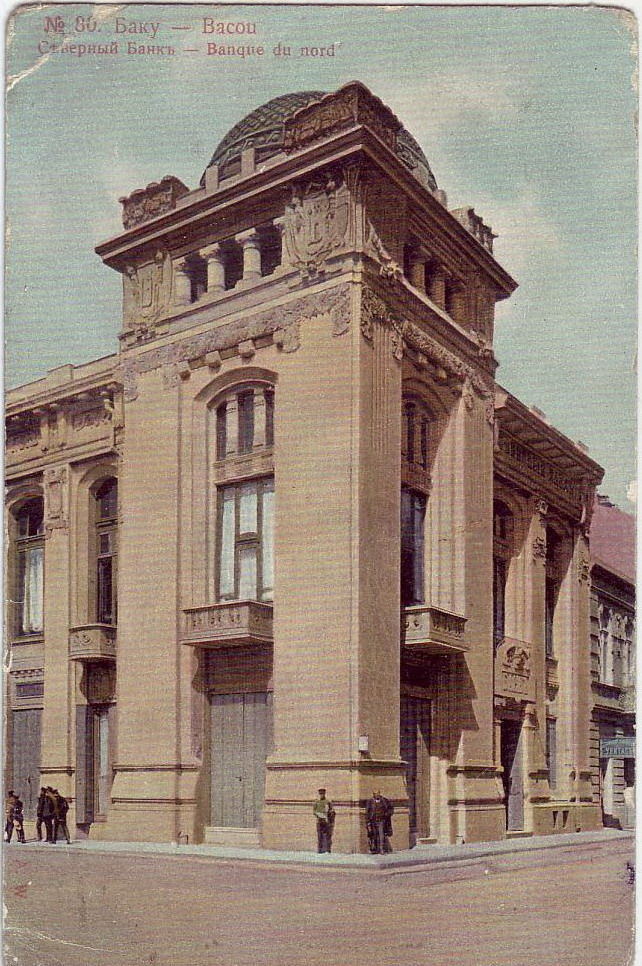
Northern Bank building on Taghiyev Street, Baku, completed in 1905

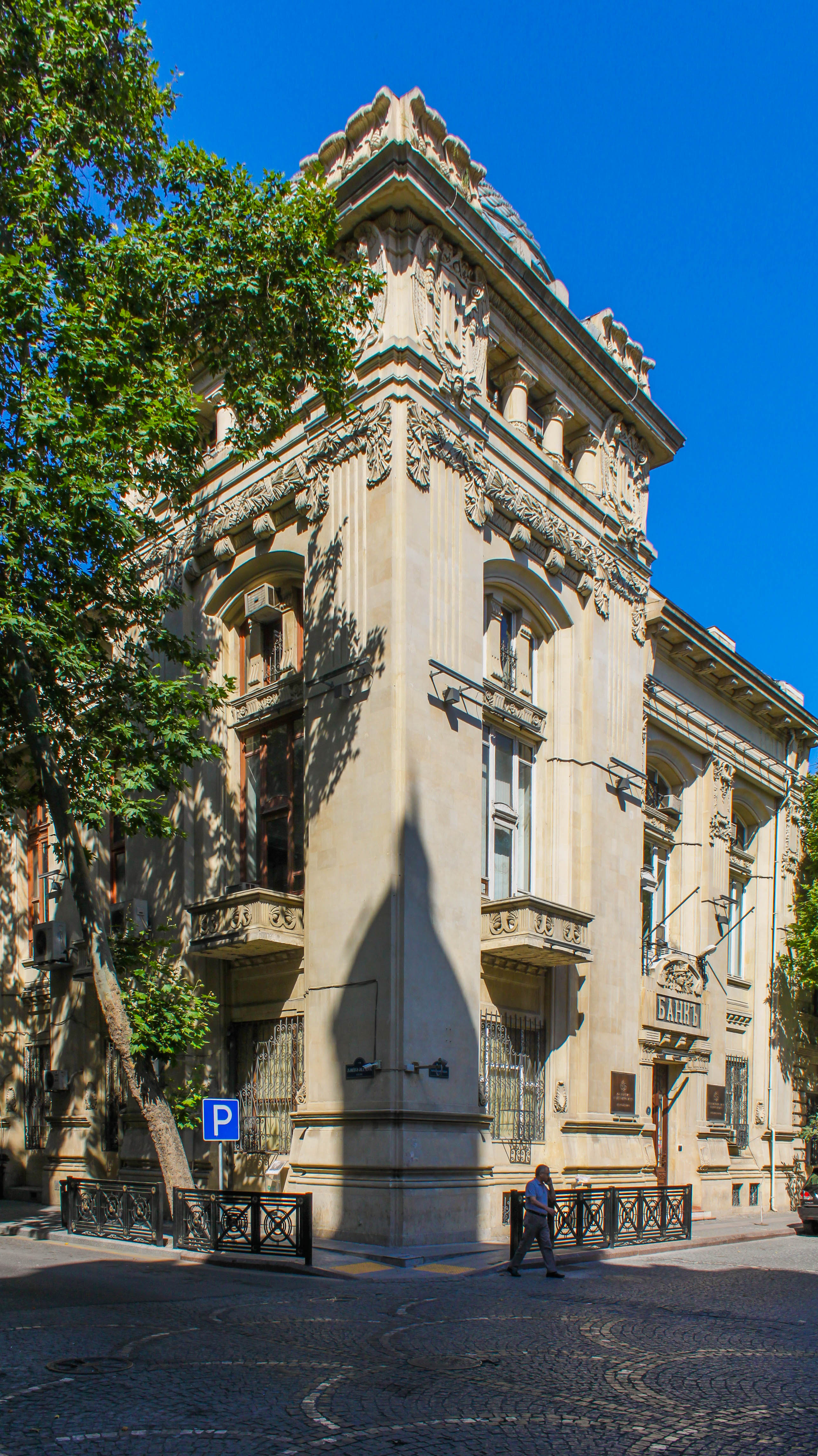
Same building in 2018, the central Baku branch of International Bank of Azerbaijan

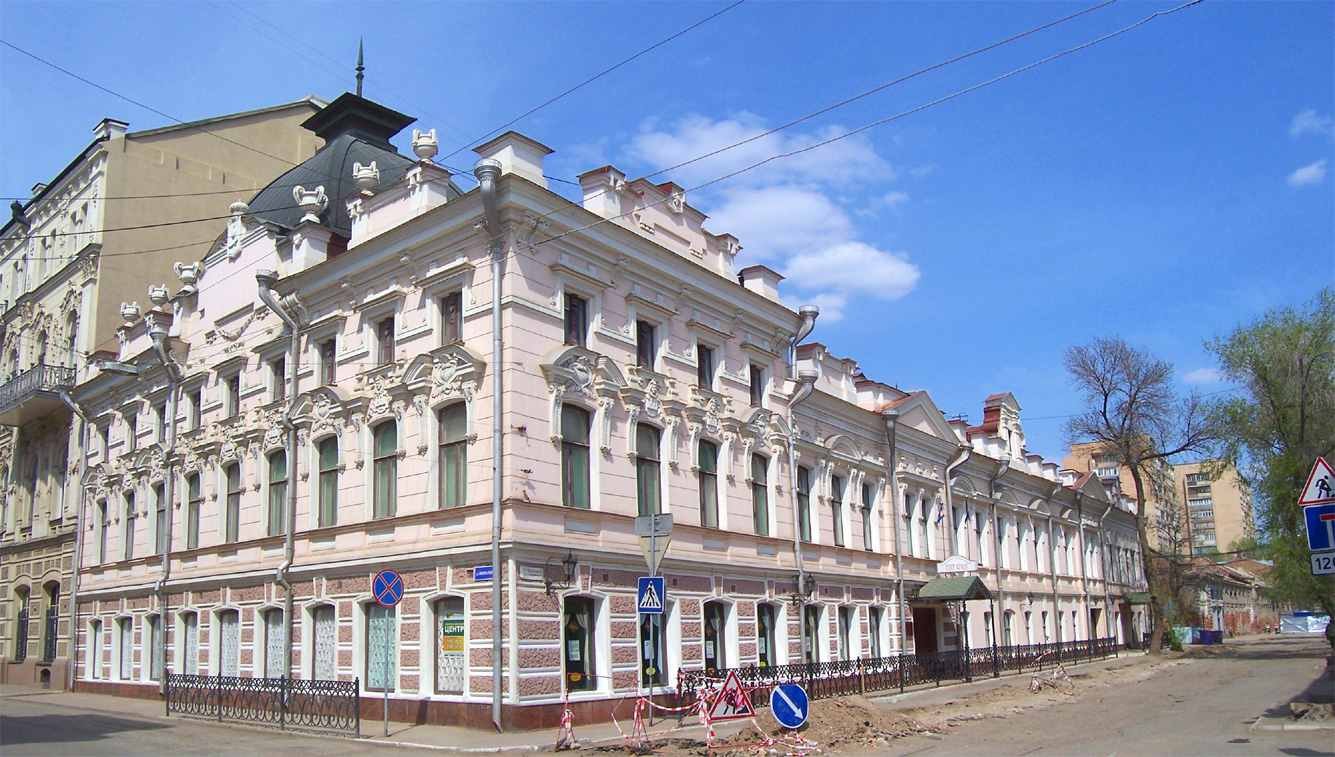
Former branch building in Astrakhan, repurposed as Astrakhan Puppet Theater, 2018

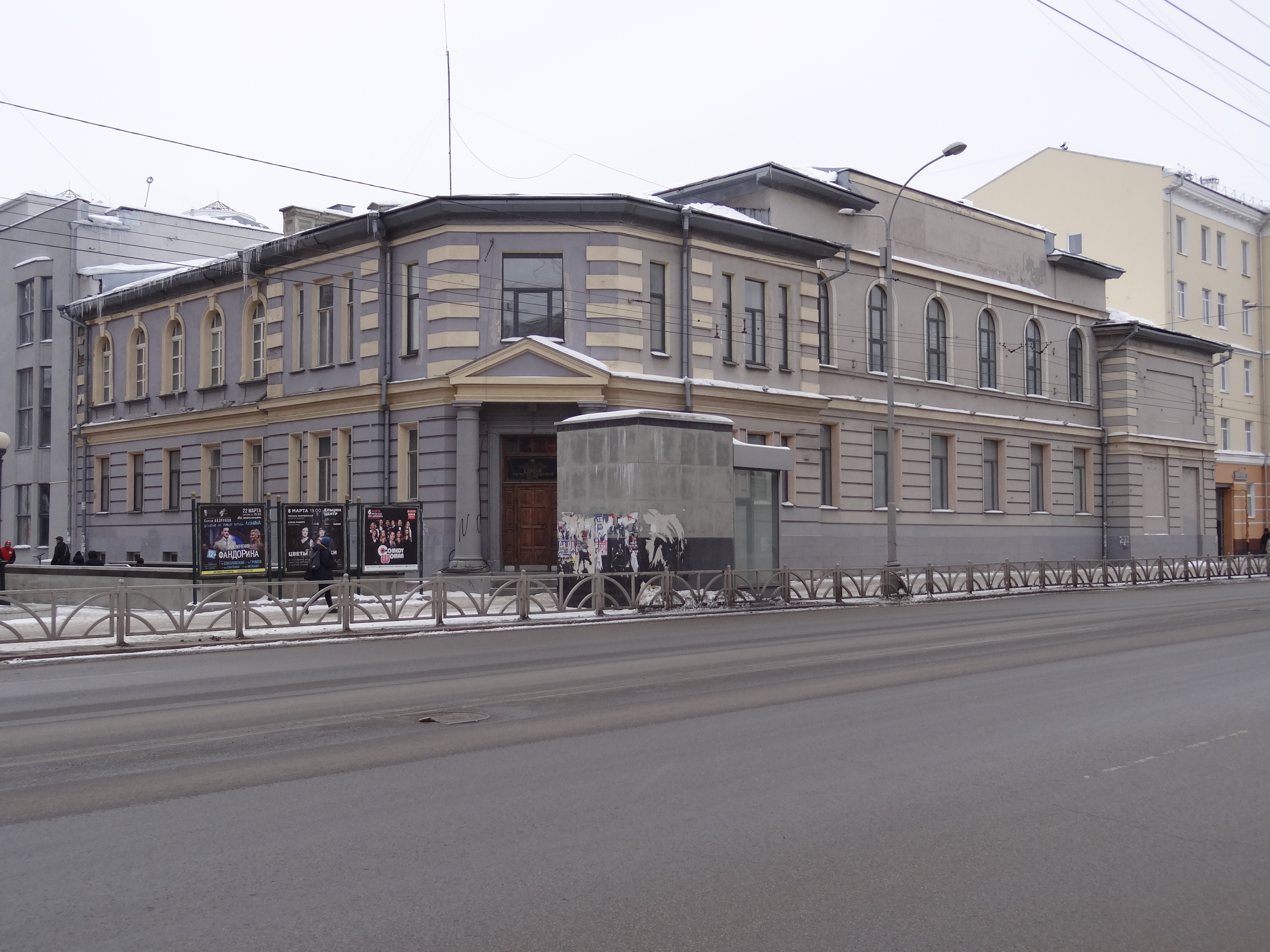
Former branch building in Yekaterinburg, 2019

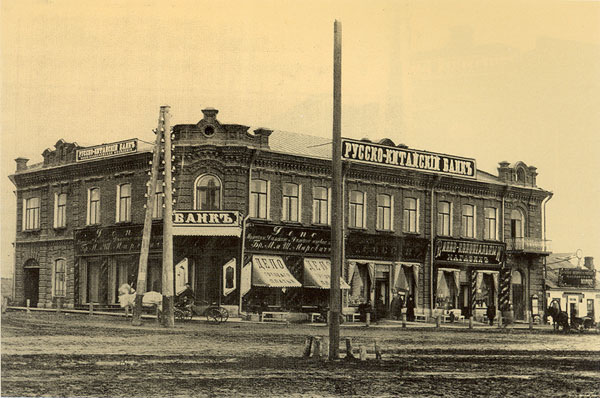
Branch building in Novosibirsk, 1910s

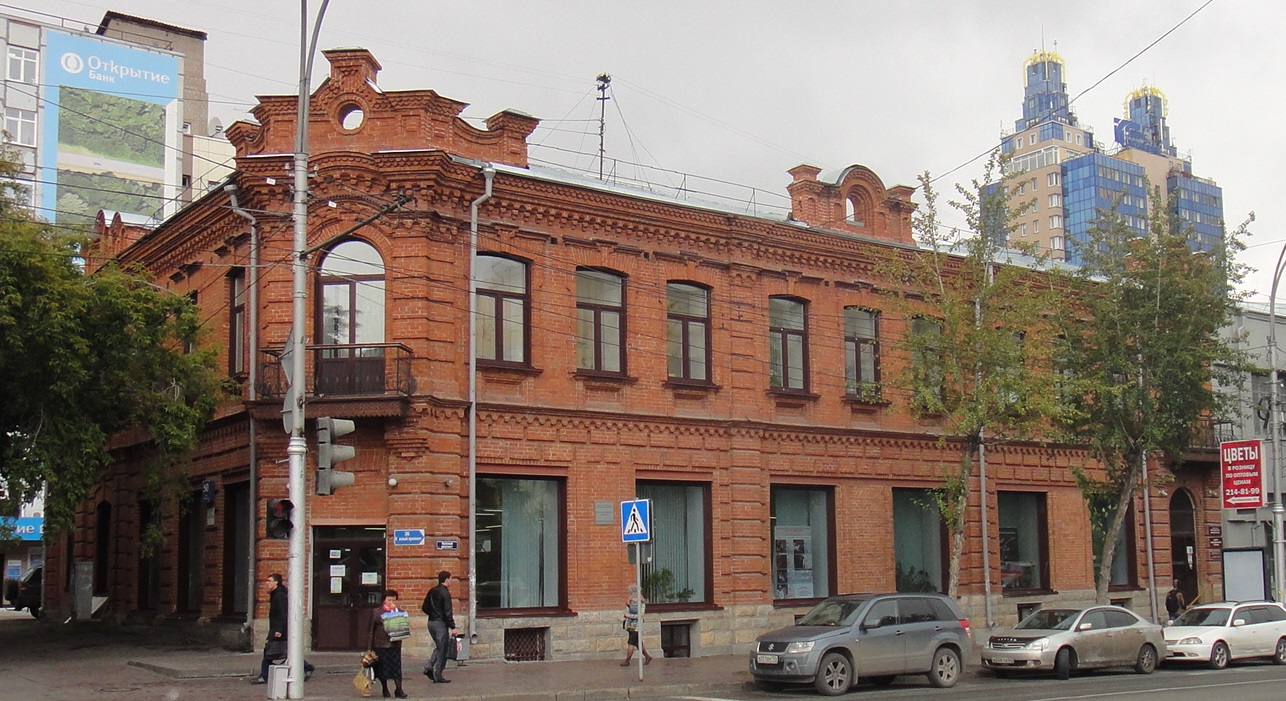
Same building in 2013

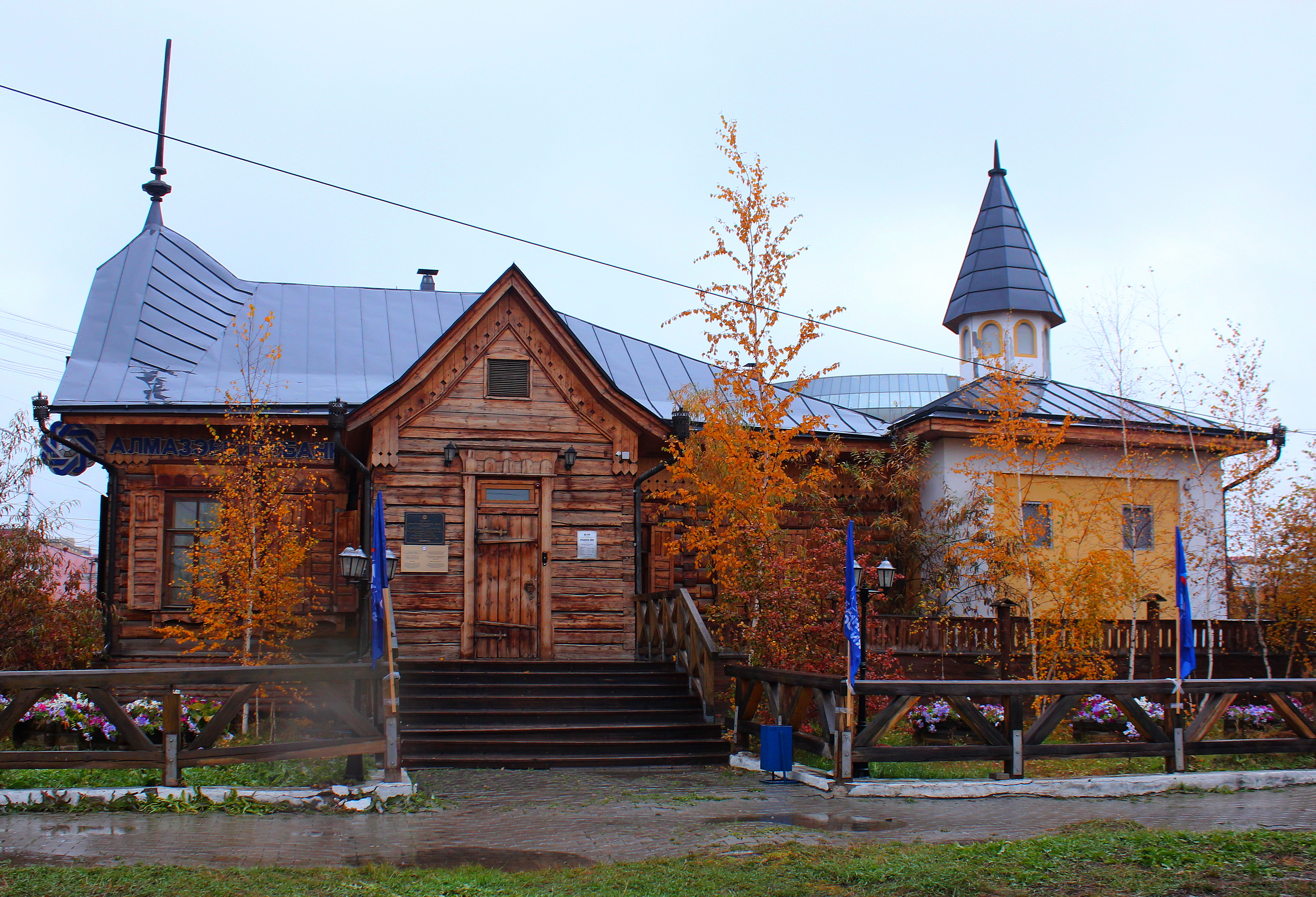
Former branch building in Yakutsk, 2021

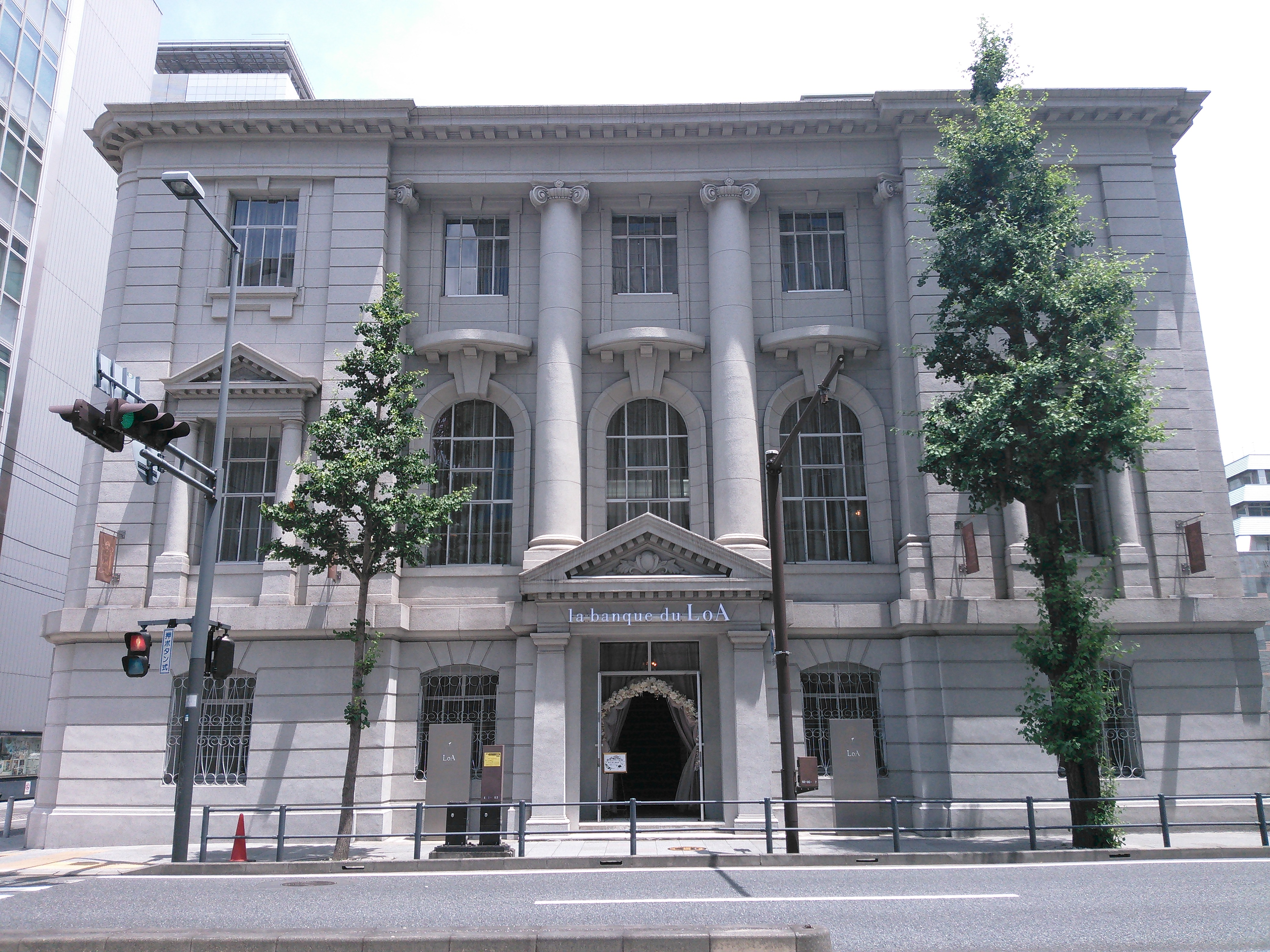
Former branch building in Yokohama, 2016

== Banknotes ==
Like other foreign banks in China at the time, the Russo-Asiatic Bank issued paper currency in the concessions where it had established branch offices, as well as in Chinese Turkestan under Yang Zengxin's rule. It also issued rubles for anti-Bolshevik forces during the Russian Civil War.

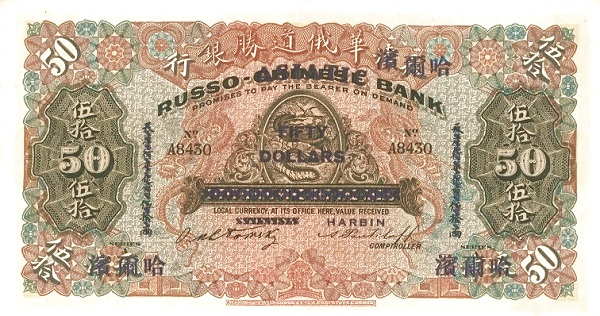
50 dollars, Harbin (Russo-Chinese Bank, stamped Russo-Asiatic Bank presumably in 1910)

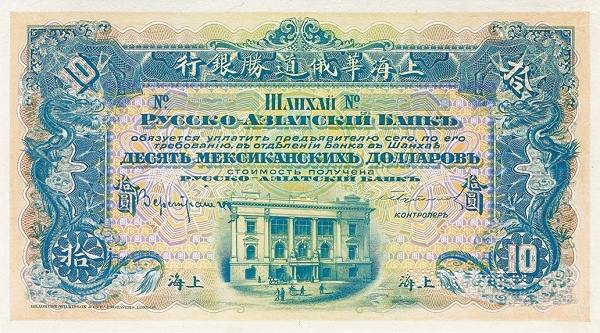
10 Mexican dollars, Shanghai (1914)

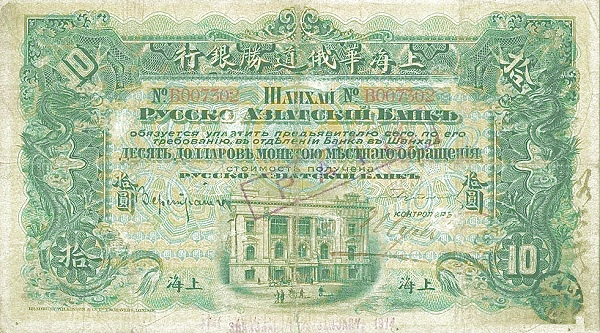
10 dollars local currency, Shanghai (1914)

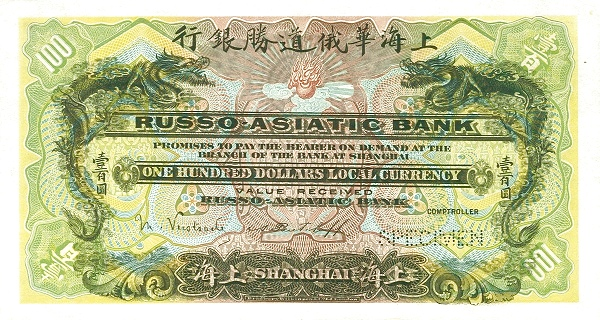
100 dollars local currency, Shanghai (1914)

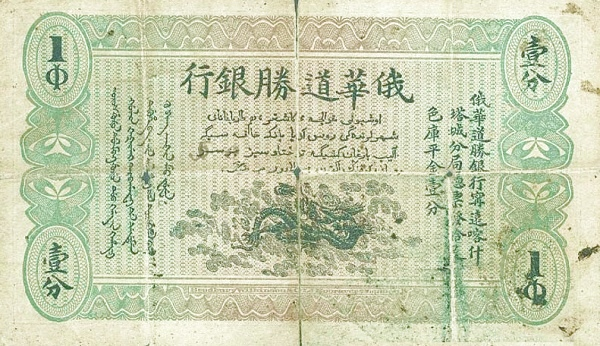
1 gold candareen, Ghulja/Chuguchak/Kashgar (1910s)

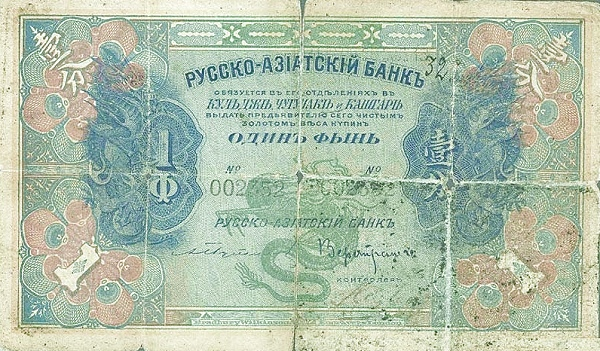
1 gold candareen, Ghulja/Chuguchak/Kashgar (1910s)

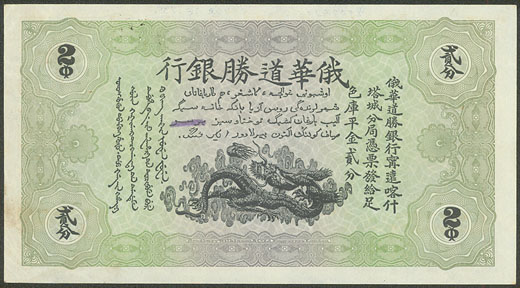
2 gold candareens, Ghulja/Chuguchak/Kashgar (1917)

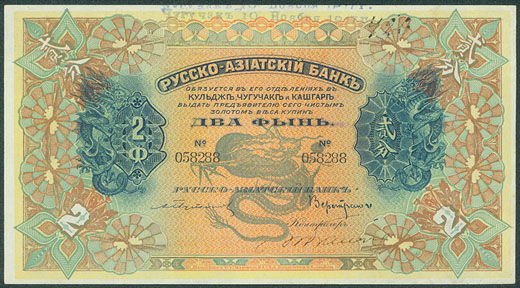
2 gold candareens, Ghulja/Chuguchak/Kashgar (1917)

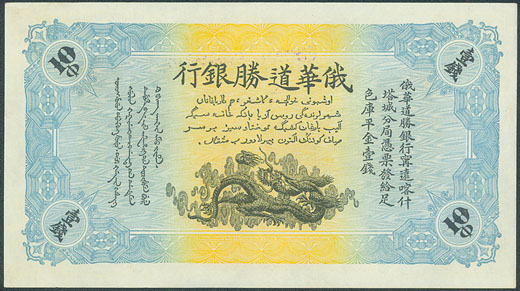
1 gold mace, or 10 candareens, Ghulja/Chuguchak/Kashgar (1917)

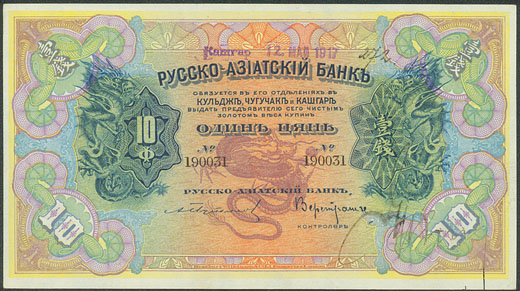
1 gold mace, Ghulja/Chuguchak/Kashgar (1917)

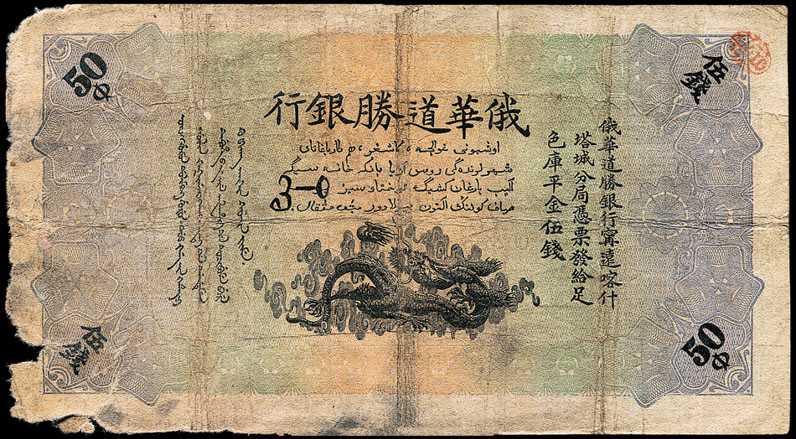
5 gold maces, Ghulja/Chuguchak/Kashgar (1917)

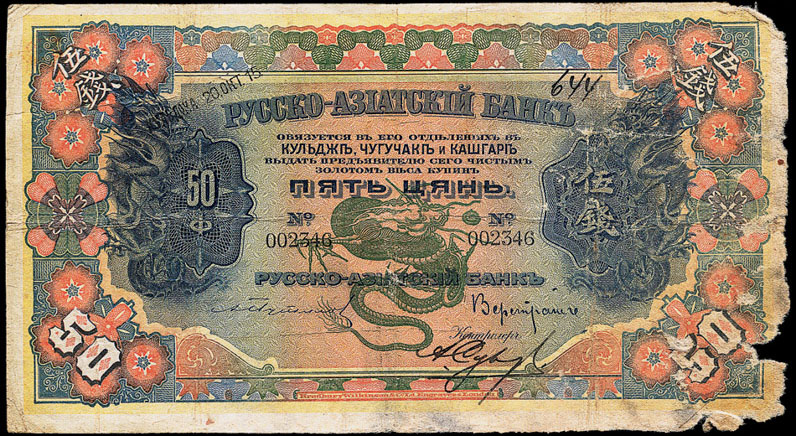
5 gold maces, Ghulja/Chuguchak/Kashgar (1917)

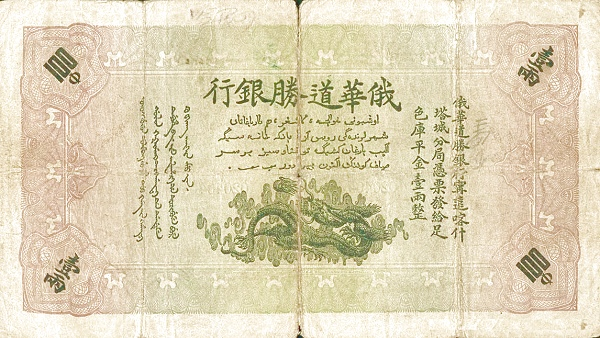
1 gold tael, or 10 maces, Ghulja/Chuguchak/Kashgar (1910s)

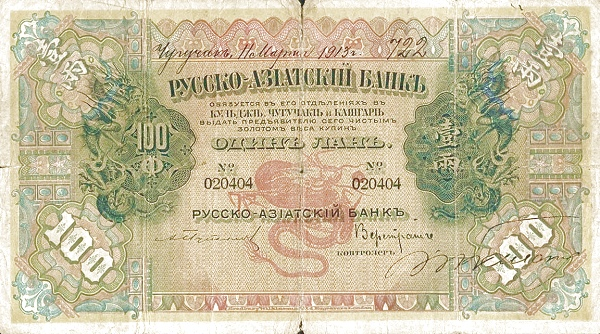
1 gold tael, Ghulja/Chuguchak/Kashgar (1910s)

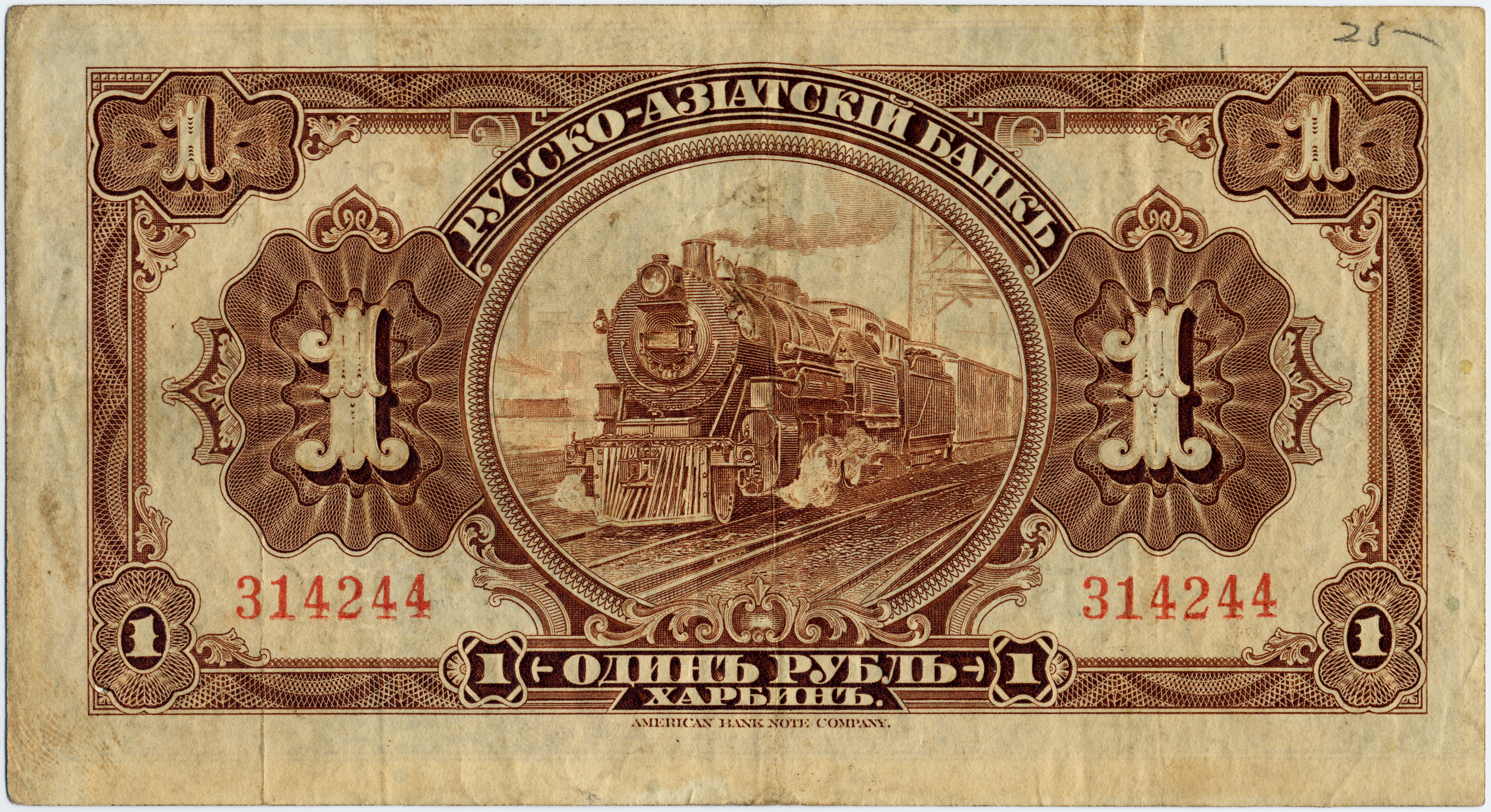
1 ruble, Harbin (1917)

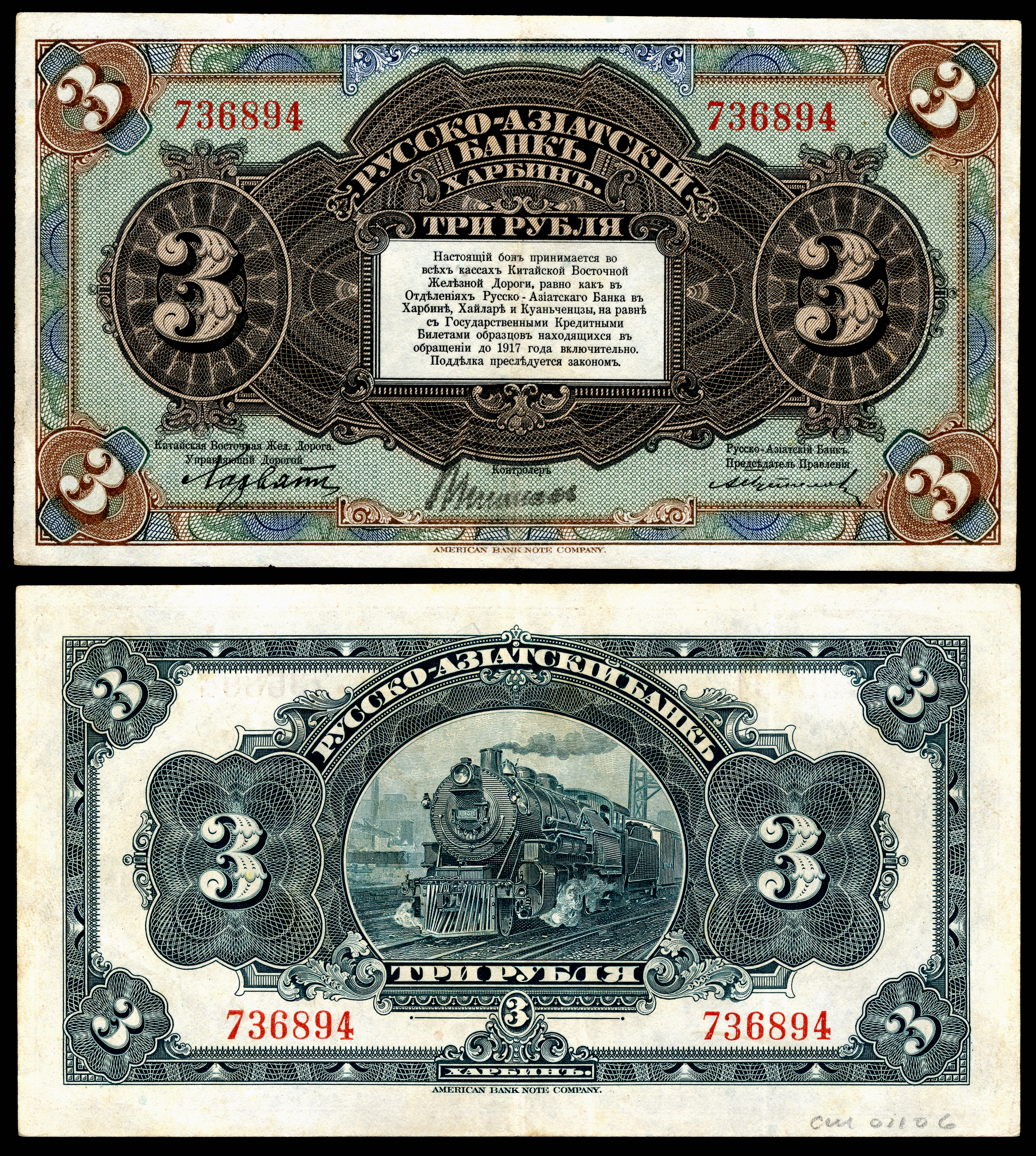
3 rubles, Harbin (1917)

== See also ==
- Banque de l'Indochine
- Yokohama Specie Bank
- Deutsch-Asiatische Bank
- International Banking Corporation
