= Romanovo, Ust-Pristansky District, Altai Krai =

Romanovo Романово
- Selo
- Location within Altai Krai Location within Russia
- Coordinates: 52°25′N 83°21′E
- Country: Russia
- Region: Altai Krai
- District: Ust-Pristansky District
- Time zone: UTC+7:00

Romanovo (Russian: Романово) is a rural locality (a selo) in Brusentsevsky Selsoviet, Ust-Pristansky District, Altai Krai, Russia. The population was 155 as of 2013. There are 9 streets.

== Geography ==
Romanovo is located 22 km west of Ust-Charyshskaya Pristan (the district's administrative centre) by road. Brusentsevo is the nearest rural locality.
