= Northern Bank building =

Bank building in Azerbaijan

- Azerbaijani: Şimal bankının binası
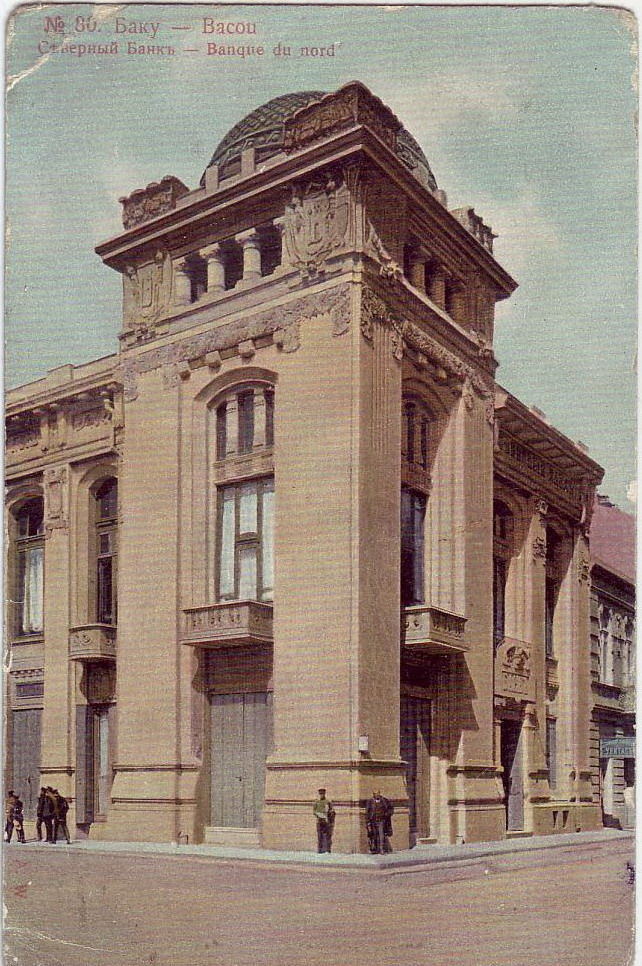
- Interactive map of the Northern Bank building area

General information
- Location: 3 Haji Zeynalabdin Tagiyev Str, Sabail, Baku, Azerbaijan
- Coordinates: 40°22′8″N 49°50′24″E
- Construction started: 1903
- Completed: 1905

Northern Bank building or Shimal Bank building (Azerbaijani: Şimal bankının binası) is an edifice located on the Haji Zeynalabdin Tagiyev Street in the Sabail district of Baku. By the order of the Cabinet of Ministers of the Republic of Azerbaijan dated with 2 August 2001, the bank building was taken under the state protection as an architectural monument of history and culture of national importance (No. 165).

== History ==
The bank building was built in 1903-1905. It housed the Baku branch of the Banque du Nord, or Northern Bank. After the merger of Northern Bank with the Russian-Chinese Bank, the Russian-Asian Bank was formed. The Baku branch of it was also located in this building. Currently, the edifice houses the central branch of the International Bank of Azerbaijan.

== Description ==
The limestone stone was used in the construction of the building which plays an important role in revealing the architectural image of the bank. This monumental building was built in the Baku Art Nouveau style and was executed at a high architectural level. The portal with the tectonics of plastic morphogenesis and a relief decorative mask is especially highlighted.

== Photos ==
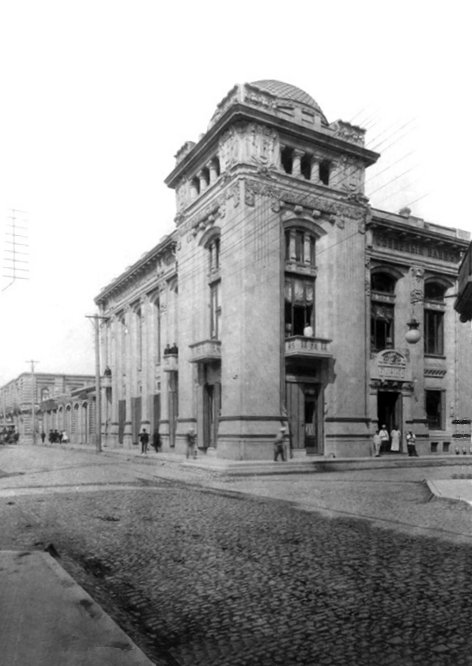

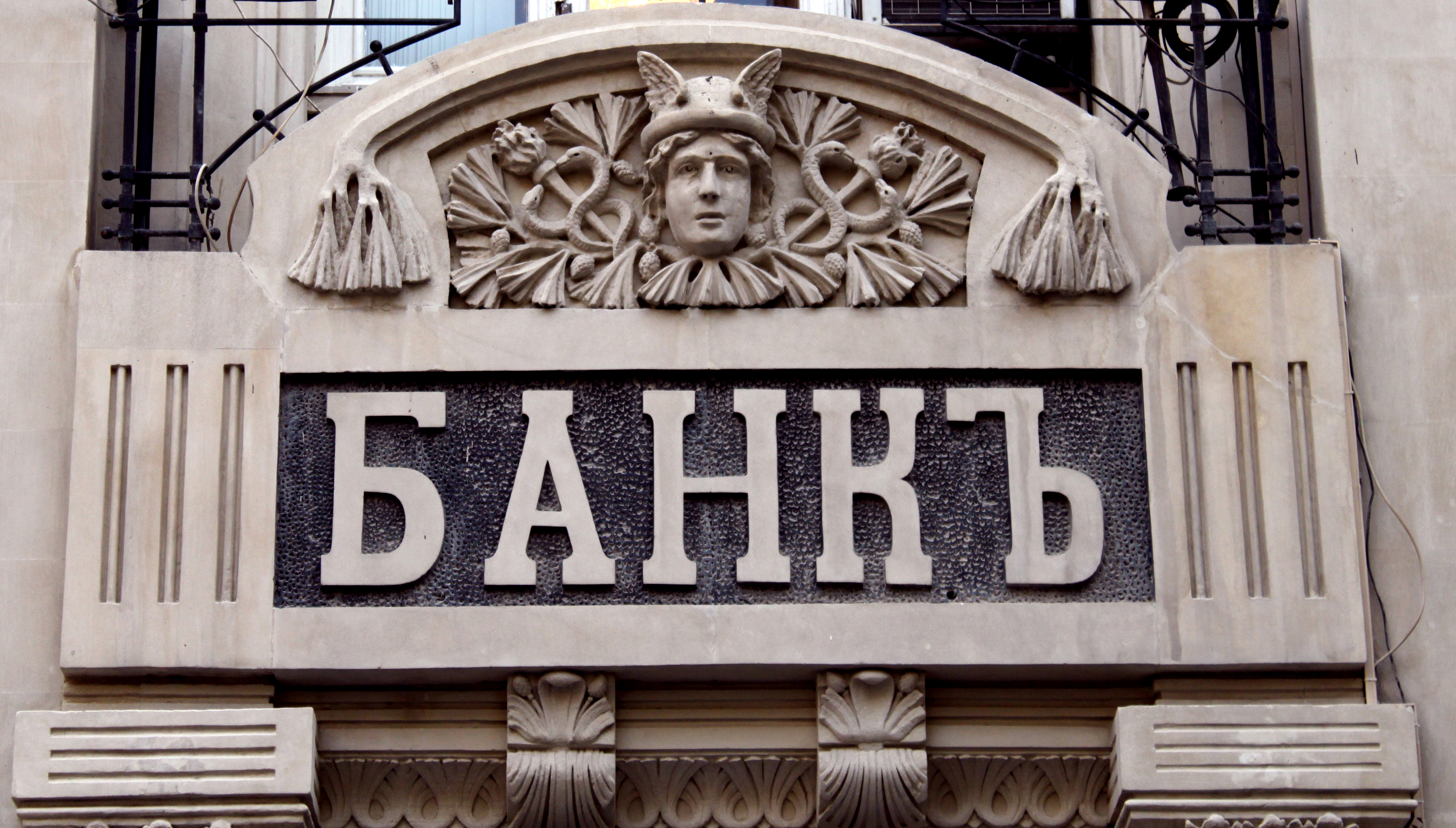

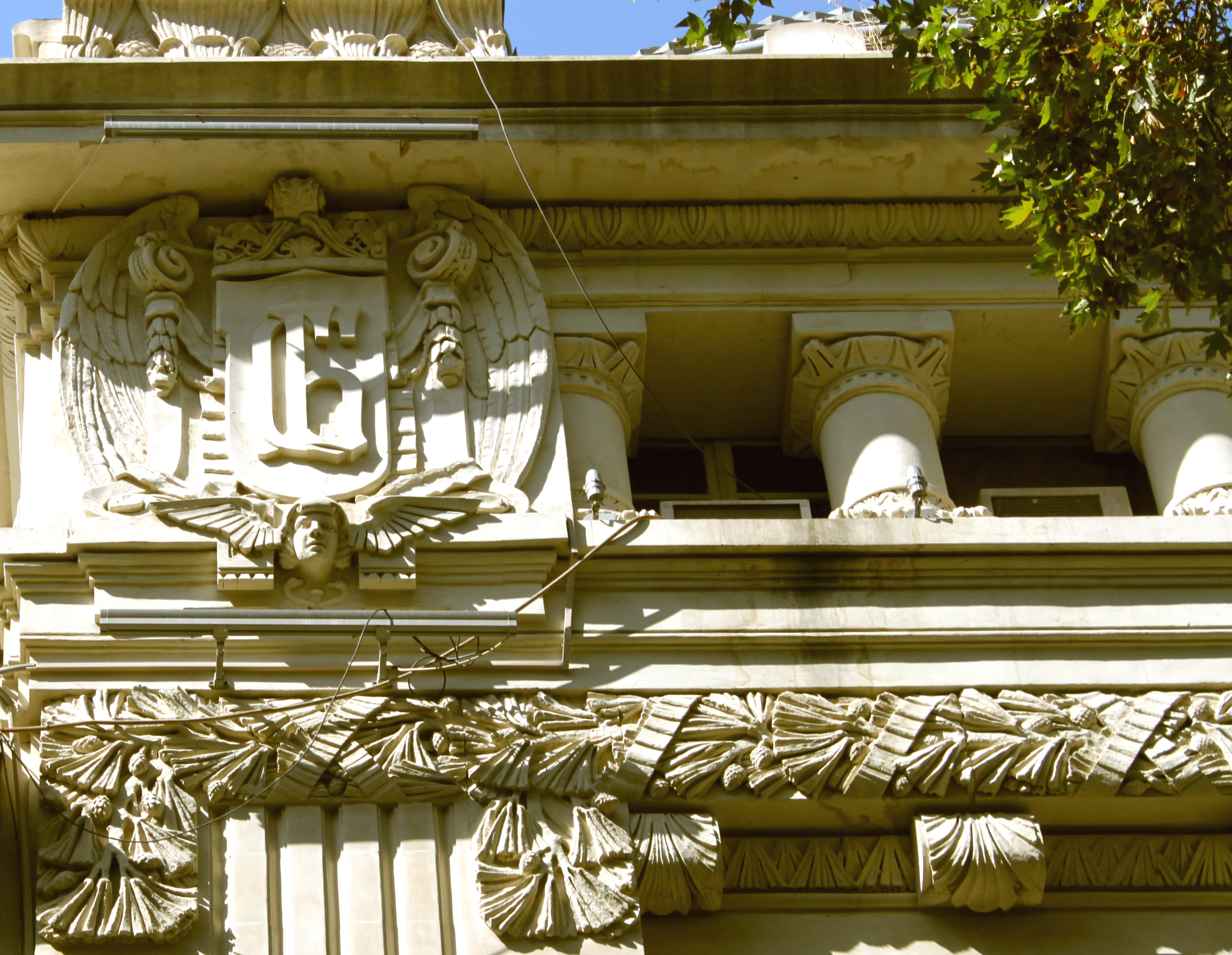

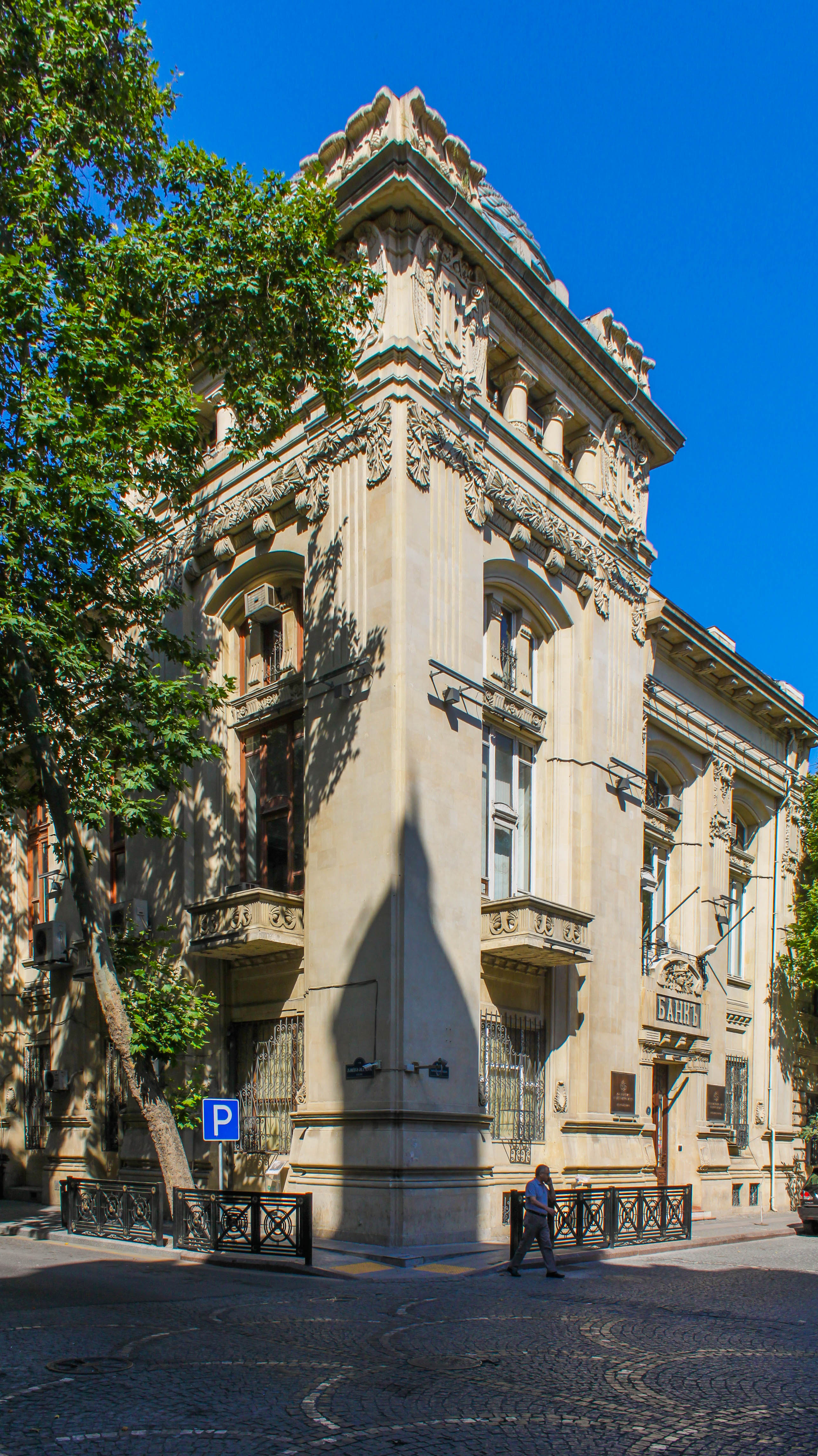

== See also ==
- Mitrofanov Residence
- Mikado Cinematography building
- Property of Haji Mustafa Rasulov
