= Belovo, Ust-Pristansky District, Altai Krai =

Belovo Белово
- Village
- Location within Altai Krai Location within Russia
- Coordinates: 52°37′N 83°37′E
- Country: Russia
- Region: Altai Krai
- District: Ust-Pristansky District
- Time zone: UTC+7:00

Belovo (Russian: Белово) is a rural locality (a selo) in Ust-Pristansky District, Altai Krai, Russia. The population was 171 in 2016. There are 9 streets.

== Geography ==
Belovo is located 31 km north of Ust-Charyshskaya Pristan (the district's administrative centre) by road. Vyatkino is the nearest rural locality.
