= Romanovo, Alexandrovsky District, Vladimir Oblast =

Romanovo Романово
- Village
- Location within Vladimir Oblast Location within Russia
- Coordinates: 56°23′N 38°35′E
- Country: Russia
- Region: Vladimir Oblast
- District: Alexandrovsky District
- Time zone: UTC+3:00

Romanovo (Russian: Романово) is a rural locality (a village) in Slednevskoye Rural Settlement, Alexandrovsky District, Vladimir Oblast, Russia. The population was 68 as of 2010. There are 3 streets.

== Geography ==
Romanovo is located on the Chyornaya River, 13 km west of Alexandrov (the district's administrative centre) by road. Sokolovo is the nearest rural locality.
