= Romanovo, Republic of Buryatia =

Romanovo Романово
- Selo
- Location within Republic of Buryatia Location within Russia
- Coordinates: 52°06′N 106°39′E
- Country: Russia
- Region: Republic of Buryatia
- District: Kabansky District
- Time zone: UTC+8:00

Romanovo (Russian: Романово) is a rural locality (a selo) in Kabansky District, Republic of Buryatia, Russia. The population was 131 as of 2010. There are 17 streets.

== Geography ==
Romanovo is located 39 km north of Kabansk (the district's administrative centre) by road. Khandala is the nearest rural locality.
