= Belovo, Rebrikhinsky District, Altai Krai =

Belovo Белово
- Selo
- Location within Altai Krai Location within Russia
- Coordinates: 52°56′N 82°15′E
- Country: Russia
- Region: Altai Krai
- District: Rebrikhinsky District
- Time zone: UTC+7:00

Belovo (Russian: Белово) is a rural locality (a selo) and the administrative center of Belovsky Selsoviet, Rebrikhinsky District, Altai Krai, Russia. The population was 1,525 as of 2013. There are 31 streets.

== Geography ==
Belovo is located 19 km southwest of Rebrikha (the district's administrative centre) by road. Rebrikha is the nearest rural locality.
