= Romanov, Volgograd Oblast =

Romanov Романов
- Khutor
- Location within Volgograd Oblast Location within Russia
- Coordinates: 50°06′N 44°35′E
- Country: Russia
- Region: Volgograd Oblast
- District: Kotovsky District
- Time zone: UTC+4:00

Romanov (Russian: Романов) is a rural locality (a khutor) in Popkovskoye Rural Settlement, Kotovsky District, Volgograd Oblast, Russia. The population was 279 as of 2010. There are 9 streets.

== Geography ==
The village is located in the steppe of the Volga Upland, on the Chertoleyka River, 200 km north of Volgograd, and 40 km southwest of Kotovo by road.
