= Romanovo, Pankrushikhinsky District, Altai Krai =

Romanovo Романово
- Selo
- Location within Altai Krai Location within Russia
- Coordinates: 53°58′N 80°29′E
- Country: Russia
- Region: Altai Krai
- District: Pankrushikhinsky District
- Time zone: UTC+7:00

Romanovo (Russian: Романово) is a rural locality (a selo) and the administrative center of Romanovsky Selsoviet, Pankrushikhinsky District, Altai Krai, Russia. The population was 456 as of 2013. There are 10 streets.

== Geography ==
Romanovo is located 27 km northeast of Pankrushikha (the district's administrative centre) by road. Kyzyltu is the nearest rural locality.
