= Romanovo, Suzdalsky District, Vladimir Oblast =

Romanovo Романово
- Selo
- Location within Vladimir Oblast Location within Russia
- Coordinates: 56°29′N 40°23′E
- Country: Russia
- Region: Vladimir Oblast
- District: Suzdalsky District
- Time zone: UTC+3:00

Romanovo (Russian: Романово) is a rural locality (a selo) in Seletskoye Rural Settlement, Suzdalsky District, Vladimir Oblast, Russia. The population was 23 as of 2010. There are two streets.

== Geography ==
Romanovo is located on the Irmes River, 8 km northwest of Suzdal (the district's administrative centre) by road. Menchakovo is the nearest rural locality.
