= Romanovo, Usolsky District, Perm Krai =

Romanovo Романово
- Selo
- Location within Perm Krai Location within Russia
- Coordinates: 59°09′N 56°46′E
- Country: Russia
- Region: Perm Krai
- District: Usolsky District
- Time zone: UTC+5:00

Romanovo (Russian: Рома́ново) is a rural locality (a selo) and the administrative center of Romanovskoye Rural Settlement, Usolsky District, Perm Krai, Russia. The population was 759 as of 2010. There are 47 streets.

== Geography ==
Romanovo is located 55 km south of Usolye (the district's administrative centre) by road. Vogulka is the nearest rural locality.
