= Romanovo, Rodnikovsky District, Ivanovo Oblast =

Romanovo Романово
- Village
- Location within Ivanovo Oblast Location within Russia
- Coordinates: 57°04′N 41°58′E
- Country: Russia
- Region: Ivanovo Oblast
- District: Rodnikovsky District
- Time zone: UTC+3:00

Romanovo (Russian: Романово) is a rural locality (a village) in Rodnikovsky District, Ivanovo Oblast, Russia. Population: 18 (2010 census);

== Geography ==
This rural locality is located 15 kilometres (9.3 mi) from Rodniki (the district's administrative centre), 61 kilometres (38 mi) from Ivanovo (capital of Ivanovo Oblast) and 301 kilometres (187 mi) from Moscow. Kortsovo is the nearest rural locality.
