= Belovo, Vologda Oblast =

Belovo Белово
- Village
- Location within Vologda Oblast Location within Russia
- Coordinates: 58°50′N 40°56′E
- Country: Russia
- Region: Vologda Oblast
- District: Gryazovetsky District
- Time zone: UTC+3:00

Belovo (Russian: Белово) is a rural locality (a village) in Vokhtozhskoye Rural Settlement, Gryazovetsky District, Vologda Oblast, Russia. The population was 5 as of 2002.

== Geography ==
Belovo is located 67 km (42 mi) southeast of Gryazovets (the district's administrative centre) by road. Tselennikovo is the nearest rural locality.
