= Ust-Charyshskaya Pristan =

Rural locality in Altai Krai, Russia

Coordinates: 52°24′N 83°39′E

Ust-Charyshskaya Pristan (Russian: Усть-Чарышская Пристань) is a rural locality (a selo), founded in 1773, and the administrative center of Ust-Pristansky District of Altai Krai, Russia, located along the Ob River in the West Siberian Plain, 155 kilometers (96 mi) south of Barnaul. Population: 5,023 (2010 census); 5,692 (2002 census); 6,510 (1989 Soviet census).
