= Ust-Pristansky District =

Ust-Pristansky District Усть-Пристанский район (Russian)
- District
- Location of Ust-Pristansky District in Altai Krai
- Coordinates: 52°24′N 83°39′E
- Country: Russia
- Federal subject: Altai Krai
- Established: 1924
- Administrative center: Ust-Charyshskaya Pristan

Area
  - Total: 2,700 km^{2} (1,000 sq mi)

Population (2010 Census)
  - Total: 13,409
  - Density: 5.0/km^{2} (13/sq mi)
  - Urban: 0%
  - Rural: 100%

Administrative structure
  - Administrative divisions: 13 Selsoviets
  - Inhabited localities: 21 rural localities

Municipal structure
  - Municipally incorporated as: Ust-Pristansky Municipal District
  - Municipal divisions: 0 urban settlements, 13 rural settlements
- Time zone: UTC+7 (MSK+4)
- OKTMO ID: 01655000
- Website: www.altairegion22.ru

Ust-Pristansky District (Russian: Усть-При́станский райо́н) is an administrative and municipal district (raion), one of the fifty-nine in Altai Krai, Russia. It is located in the center of the krai. The area of the district is 2,700 square kilometers (1,000 sq mi). Its administrative center is the rural locality (a selo) of Ust-Charyshskaya Pristan. Population: 13,409 (2010 Census); 16,806 (2002 Census); 19,891 (1989 Soviet census). The population of Ust-Charyshskaya Pristan accounts for 37.5% of the district's total population.
