= Valeri Alikov =

Mari poet, critic and translator

- Born: Валерий Аликов; January 1, 1960; Gornomariysky District
- Died: September 11, 2016 (aged 56); Helsinki
- Other name: Valery Alikov
- Occupations: Poet, translator

Valeri Alikov or Valery Alikov (Hill Mari: Вале́рий А́ликов) also known as Valeri Mikor (Валери Микор) (1 January 1960 – 11 September 2016) was a Hill Mari-speaking Mari poet, critic and translator.

== Life ==
Alikov was born in Novaya Sloboda (Äвäсир) village of Gornomariysky District, and died in 2016 after a serious illness (lung cancer) in Helsinki, Finland, where he had lived for over 20 years.

Alikov studied literature and semiotics at the universities of Tartu and Helsinki. In the years 1995–2007, he released the literary magazine "Tsikmӓ" which he named after the capital of his district, Tsikmӓ (Цикмӓ or Kozmodemyansk). Alikov translated Finnish literature, such as Aleksis Kivi's The Seven Brothers, and Estonian literature, into Hill Mari.
