= Northwestern Mari language =

Uralic language spoken in Russia

Northwestern Mari
- йөтнӫмӓл-кӓсвел маре йӹлмӹ jůtnṳ̊mäl-käsvel mare jÿlmÿ
- Native to: Russia
- Region: Kirov Oblast (Yaransky, Tuzhinsky, Kiknursky, Sanchursky districts), Nizhny Novgorod Oblast (Tonshayevsky, Sharangsky, Tonkinsky districts), Mari El (north of Kilemarsky and Medvedevsky districts)
- Ethnicity: Northwestern Mari
- Language family: Uralic: Mari; Western Mari; Northwestern Mari
- Dialects: Yaransk; Sharanga; Tonshaevo; Lipsha
- Writing system: Cyrillic

Language codes
- ISO 639-3: –
- Glottolog: yara1249
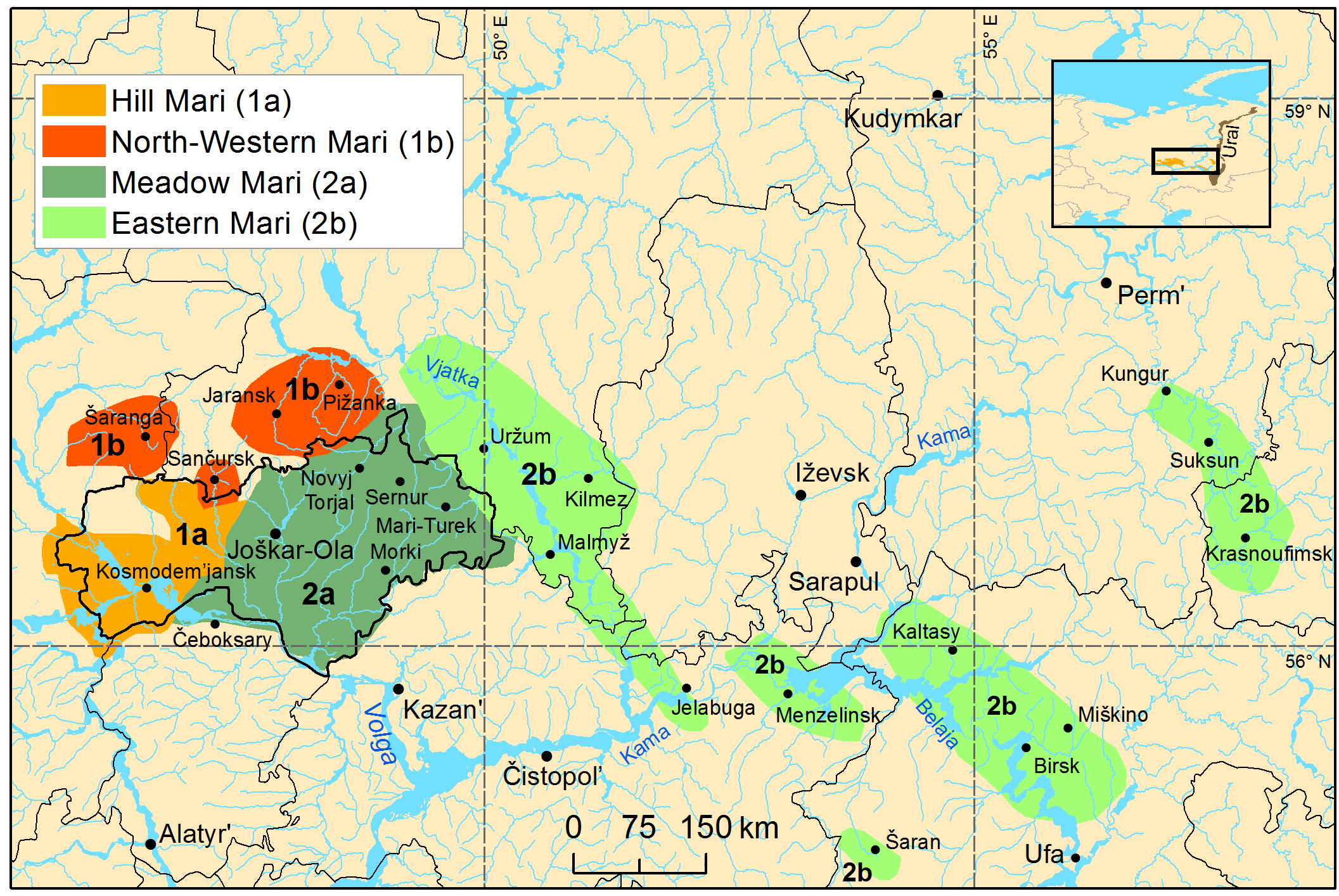
- Northwestern Mari

Northwestern Mari (маре йӹлмӹ, mare jÿlmÿ) is a Uralic language variety closely related to Hill Mari and Meadow Mari. With the first of them Northwestern Mari joins as a dialect group of Western Mari language. Northwestern Mari is the language of Northwestern Mari people, who live in Russia in the Yaransky, Tuzhinsky, Kiknursky, Sanchursky districts of Kirov Oblast, Tonshayevsky, Sharangsky and Tonkinsky districts of Nizhny Novgorod Oblast and partly in Kilemarsky and Medvedevsky districts of Mari El. It is written using the Northwestern Mari Cyrillic script, but does not have an official status in any subjects of the Russian Federation.

Northwestern Mari people have difficulties understanding both other literary languages. The first book in Northwestern Mari, Маре букварь (Mare bukvar, Northwestern Mari primer) was printed in 1995, and the dialect thereby became the third literary standard.

== Dialects ==
- Yaransk dialect – the largest by number of speakers and spread territory, Northwestern Mari standardized variety.
  - Kiknur subdialect
  - Tuzha subdialect
  - Sanchursk subdialect
- Sharanga dialect – the closest to Hill Mari
- Tonshaevo dialect
- Lipsha dialect

== Alphabet ==
А а	Ӓ ӓ	Б б	В в	Г г	Д д	Е е	Ё ё
Ж ж	З з	И и	Й й	К к	Л л	М м	Н н
Ҥ ҥ	О о	Ӧ ӧ	Ө ө	Ӫ ӫ	П п	Р р	С с
Т т	У у	Ӱ ӱ	Ф ф	Х х	Ц ц	Ч ч	Ш ш
Щ щ	ъ	Ы ы	Ӹ ӹ	ь	Э э	Ю ю	Я я

== Bibliography ==
- Moisio A., Saarinen S. Tscheremissisches Wörterbuch / Lexica Societatis Fenno-Ugricae, XXXII. Helsinki, 2008.
- Дмитриев С. Д., Дмитриева В. М., Тужаров Г. М. Маре букварь: (учебник для первого класса). Йошкар-Ола, 1995.
- Иванов И Г., Тужаров Г. М. Северо-западное наречие марийского языка / Диалекты марийского языка. Вып. I. Йошкар-Ола, 1970.
- Иванов И Г., Тужаров Г. М. Словарь северо-западного наречия марийского языка / Диалекты марийского языка. Вып. II. Йошкар-Ола, 1971.
- Utyatin A. Tatar borrowings in Sharanga dialect // XXII Международная студенческая конференция по финно-угроведению. Тезисы докладов.- Йошкар-Ола, 2006. – С. 23.
