= Northwestern Mari =

Northwestern Mari may refer to:

- Northwestern Mari people
- Northwestern Mari language
