= Arino =

Arino may refer to:

== People ==
- Aitor Ariño (born 1992), Spanish handball player
- Amalia Sánchez Ariño (1883–1969), Argentinian actress
- Gaspar Ariño Ortiz (1936–2023), Spanish lawyer, professor, and politician
- Julia Arino (born 1991), Argentinian swimmer
- Manu Morlanes (born 1999), Spanish football player
- Shinya Arino (有野 晋哉; born 1972), Japanese comedian
- Yoshiharu Arino (born 1980), Japanese speed skater

== Places ==
- Arino, Mari El Republic, Russia
- Ariño, Aragon, Spain

== See also ==
- Arrino, Western Australia
