= Olyk Ipai =

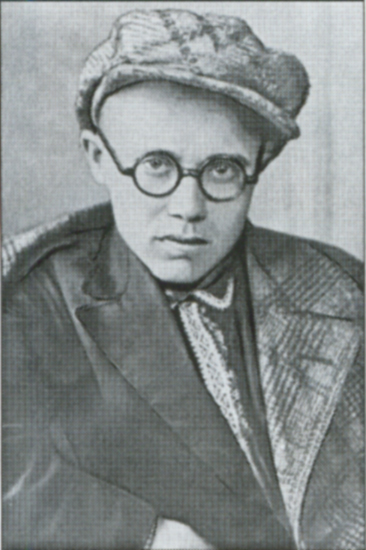
Olyk Ipai

Olyk Ipai (Mari: О́лык Ипа́й; 24 March 1912 – 11 November 1937) was a Mari poet.

He was born as Ipatiy Stepanovich Stepanov (Russian: Ипáтий Степáнович Степáнов) in the village of Toimetsola in the Mari El. He attended a school in the village of Aryn, of which the Mari national poet Sergei Chavain was the headmaster at the time. He studied at a pedagogical college in Yoshkar-Ola, and later studied cinematography in Moscow; however, he chose to pursue poetry instead. He also translated many works of Alexander Pushkin, Nikolay Nekrasov, Vladimir Mayakovsky and Eduard Bagritsky from Russian to Mari. He was involved in the Mari Union of Soviet Writers and was commissioned to write a letter "from the Mari people to Comrade Stalin" with Sergei Chavain and Osyp Shabdar in 1936. Like many of the Mari intelligentsia at the time, he was executed during the Great Purge.
