= Hill Mari people =

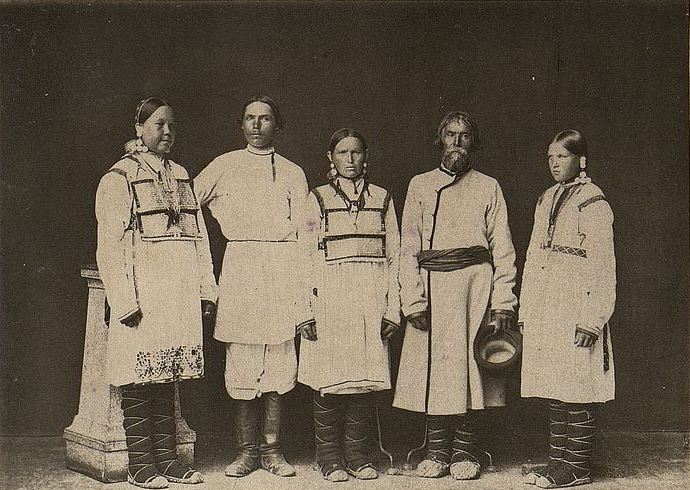
- A group of Hill Mari people, c. 1870

Total population
- 60,000 (2002, est.)

Languages
- Hill Mari language

The Hill Mari or Mountain Mari (Hill Mari: кырык марынвлӓ) are a subgroup of the Mari people, a Volga Finnic ethnic group of Russia. They are concentrated in Gornomariysky District of the Mari El republic.

== History ==
The tribes of the Pozdnegorodetskaya culture are believed to be the distant ancestors of the modern Hill Mari.

The Hill Mari are first mentioned in the written record in the 16th century, during the Russo-Kazan Wars in the region. The Hill Mari, along with the Chuvash, allied with Russia. In 1546, the Hill Mari were incorporated into the Russian state.

Several institutions dedicated to preservation of Hill Mari heritage have been founded. The Ethnographic Open-Air Museum in Kozmodemyansk, opened in 1983, holds a collection of artefacts and architecture relating to traditional Hill Mari farming and craft. The Nikon Ignatyev Museum of Local History, which is mainly dedicated to art and literature, was opened in Salymsola in 1995. The Hill Mari Theater of Drama was founded by then-president of Mari El Vladislav Zotin in 1994, who is of Hill Mari origin.

== Culture ==
Traditionally, the Hill Mari have mainly engaged in farming, foraging, fishing, and beekeeping. Consequently, weather folklore is prominent in Hill Mari culture.

In contrast to the Meadow and Eastern Mari, most Hill Mari are Orthodox Christians and do not practice traditional Mari religion.
