= Kilemary =

Kilemary Килемары
- Urban-type settlement

Other transcription(s)
  - Hill Mari: Кӹлемар
  - Meadow Mari: Килемар
- Interactive map of Kilemary
- Location of Kilemary Kilemary (Mari El)
- Coordinates: 56°47′N 46°53′E
- Country: Russia
- Federal subject: Mari El
- Administrative district: Kilemarsky District
- Urban-type settlementSelsoviet: Kilemary Urban-Type Settlement
- Founded: 1850

Population (2010 Census)
  - Total: 4,073
  - Estimate (2025): 3,798 (−6.8%)

Administrative status
  - Capital of: Kilemarsky District, Kilemary Urban-Type Settlement

Municipal status
  - Municipal district: Kilemarsky Municipal District
  - Urban settlement: Kilemary Urban Settlement
  - Capital of: Kilemarsky Municipal District, Kilemary Urban Settlement
- Time zone: UTC+3 (MSK)
- Postal code: 425270
- OKTMO ID: 88616151051

Kilemary population
- 2010 Census: 4,073
- 2002 Census: 3,951
- 1989 Census: 4,112
- 1979 Census: 2,951

Kilemary (Russian: Килема́ры; Hill Mari: Кӹлемар, Kÿlemar; Meadow Mari: Килемар, Kilemar) is an urban locality (an urban-type settlement) and the administrative center of Kilemarsky District of the Mari El Republic, Russia. As of the 2010 Census, its population was 4,073.

== Administrative and municipal status ==
Within the framework of administrative divisions, Kilemary serves as the administrative center of Kilemarsky District. As an administrative division, the urban-type settlement of Kilemary, together with fourteen rural localities, is incorporated within Kilemarsky District as Kilemary Urban-Type Settlement (an administrative division of the district). As a municipal division, Kilemary Urban-Type Settlement is incorporated within Kilemarsky Municipal District as Kilemary Urban Settlement.

== Notable residents ==
- Sergey Chilikov (1953–2020), photographer
- Vladislav Zotin (born 1942), President of Mari El 1991–1997
