= Meadow Mari =

Meadow Mari may refer to:

- Meadow Mari people
- Meadow Mari language
