= Hill Mari =

Hill Mari may refer to:

- Hill Mari people
- Hill Mari language
