= Eastern Mari =

Eastern Mari may refer to:

- Eastern Mari people
- Meadow Mari language, also called Eastern Mari language
