= Albertina Ivanova =

Mari poet (born 1954)

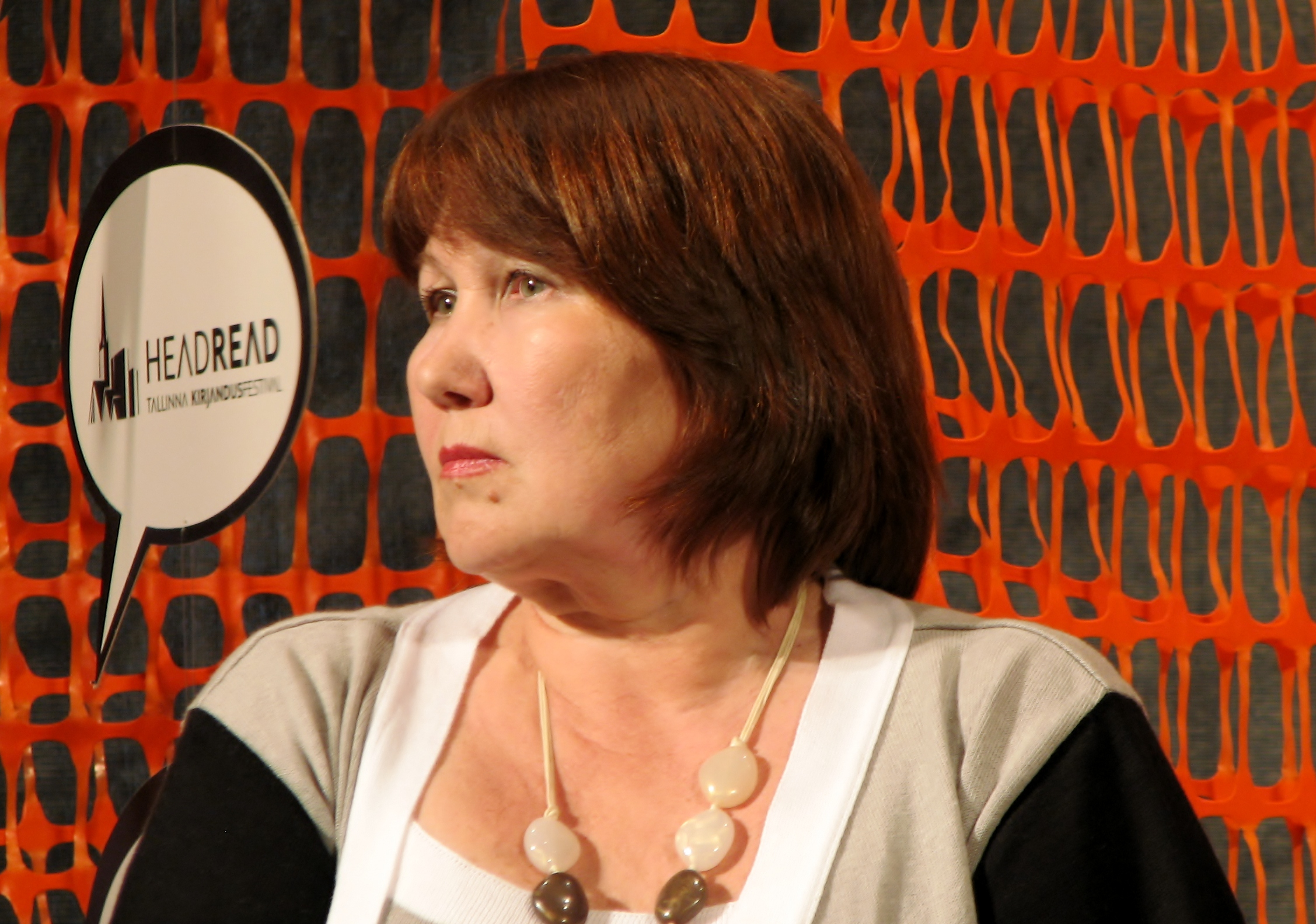
Ivanovna in 2012

Albertina Petrovna Ivanova (Mari: Альбертина Петровна Иванова; born 11 August 1954) is a Mari poet.

She has been described as one of the best-known Mari poets of the 1990s.

She is one of the subjects of Arvo Valton's 1998 book Neli marilannat : Svetlana Essaulova, Valentina Iziljanova, Albertina Ivanova, Nadežda Nikitina [Four Mari Women ...] (Tallinn: Virgela, ISBN 9789985862612)
