= Arino, Mari El Republic =

Village in Mari El, Russia

Arino Арино
- Village
- Interactive map of Arino
- Location of Arino
- Coordinates: 56°22′N 48°49′E
- Country: Russia
- Federal subject: Mari El

Area
  - Total: 0.2 km^{2} (0.077 sq mi)
- Elevation: 191 m (627 ft)

Population (2010 Census)
  - Total: 239
  - Estimate (2010): 239 (0%)
  - Density: 1,200/km^{2} (3,100/sq mi)
- Time zone: UTC+3 (MSK)
- Postal code: 425134
- OKTMO ID: 88632425111

Arino (Russian: Арино; Meadow Mari: Арын, Aryn) is a village in Morkinsky District, Mari El Republic, Russia.

There were 220 inhabitants in 2003, and 239 in 2010.

== Notable people ==
- Sergei Chavain (1888–1937), Mari poet and playwright, was the school headmaster in Aryn
- Olyk Ipai (1912–1937), Mari poet, attended school in Aryn
