= Kozmodemyansk, Mari El Republic =

Town in the Mari El Republic, Russia

Kozmodemyansk Козьмодемьянск Чикме (Chuvash)
- Town

Other transcription(s)
  - Hill Mari: Цикмӓ
  - Meadow Mari: Чыкма
  - Chuvash: Чикме
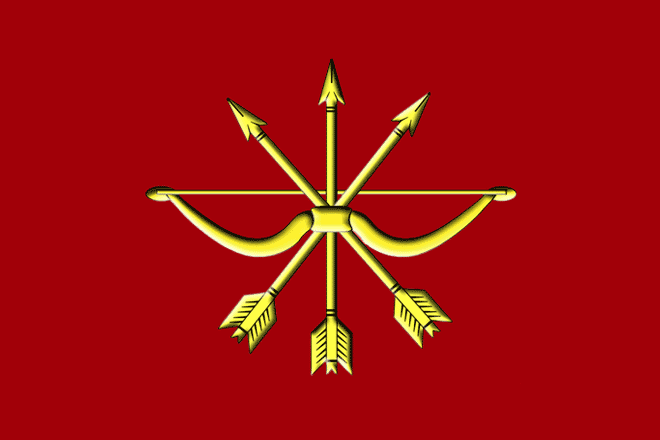
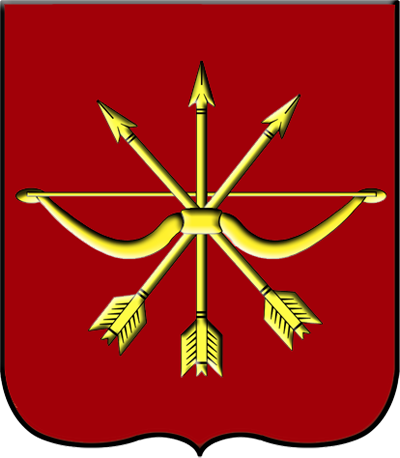
- Flag Coat of arms
- Interactive map of Kozmodemyansk
- Location of Kozmodemyansk Kozmodemyansk (Mari El)
- Coordinates: 56°20′12″N 46°34′16″E
- Country: Russia
- Federal subject: Mari El
- Founded: 1583
- Elevation: 120 m (390 ft)

Population (2010 Census)
  - Total: 21,257
  - Estimate (2023): 19,355 (−8.9%)

Administrative status
  - Subordinated to: town of republic significance of Kozmodemyansk
  - Capital of: town of republic significance of Kozmodemyansk, Gornomariysky District

Municipal status
  - Urban okrug: Kozmodemyansk Urban Okrug
  - Capital of: Kozmodemyansk Urban Okrug
- Time zone: UTC+3 (MSK)
- Postal codes: 425350, 425352–425355
- OKTMO ID: 88715000001
- Website: web.archive.org/web/20140714212424/http://www.kozmodemjansk.ru/

Kozmodemyansk (Russian: Козьмодемья́нск; Hill Mari: Цикмӓ, Tsikmӓ meaning Palisade; Meadow Mari: Чыкма, Čykma) or Tsikmӓ is a town in the Mari El Republic, Russia, located at the confluence of the Vetluga and the Volga Rivers. Population: 21,257 (2010 census); 22,771 (2002 census); 24,746 (1989 Soviet census).

== History ==
Though not attested in any document, the town of Kozmodemyansk was likely preceded by a Mari wooden fortress controlling the confluence of the Volga and the Vetluga Rivers. It was also an important resting and trading place for traders from the North who traveled along the river to Volga Bulgaria. The Mongol invasion of Volga Bulgaria was a serious blow to the region.

Kozmodemyansk was founded by Tsar Ivan the Terrible in 1583 after his conquest of Kazan in 1552 and the Cheremis Wars in 1553–1557, 1582, and 1592 as a frontier fortress to guard the new border of the Grand Duchy of Moscow. The fortress was named after Sts. Cosmas and Damian. For many years the streltsy fortress was the only building in the area.

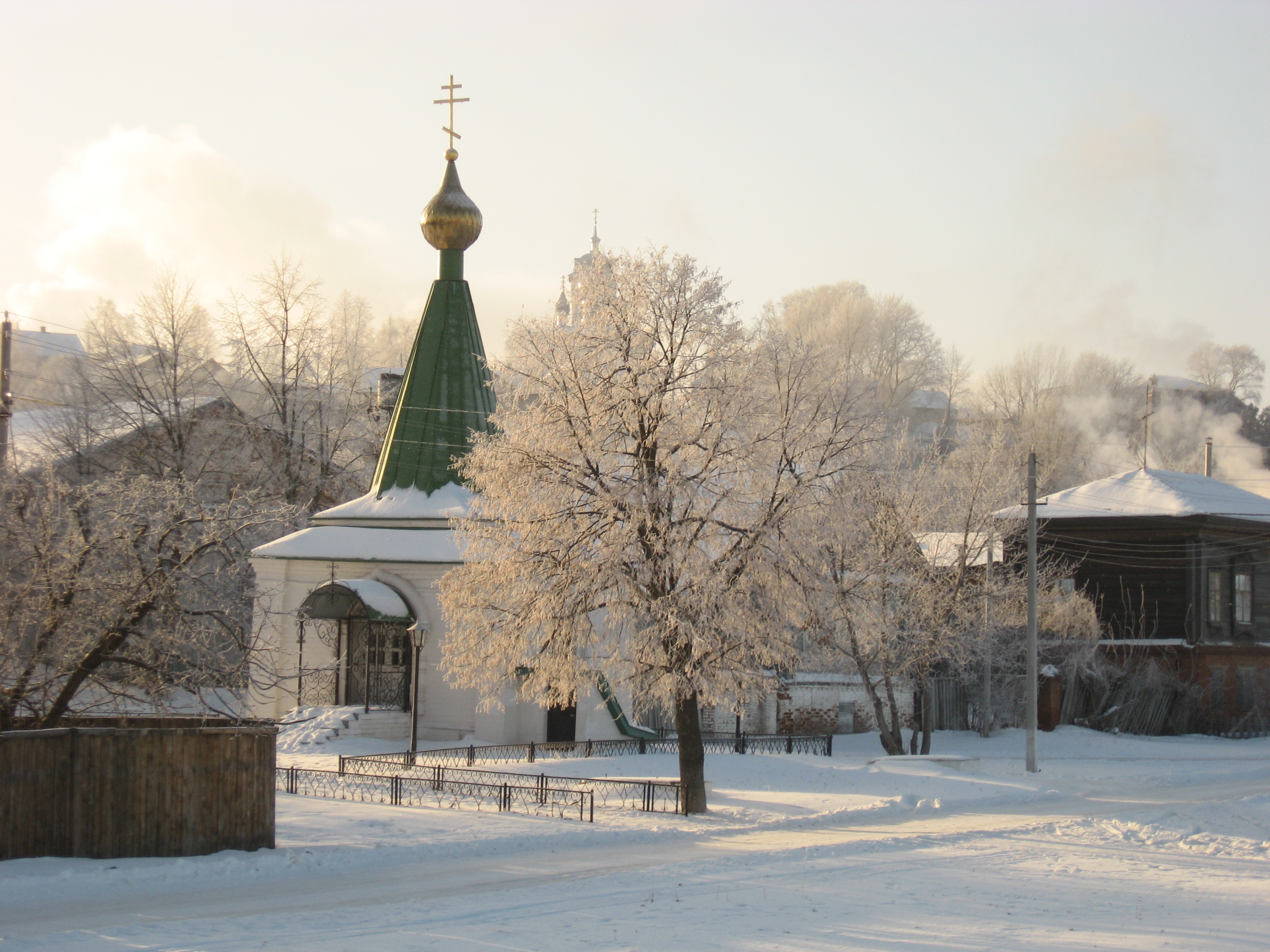
Streltsy Chapel (1698)

As commerce along the Volga developed, a town gradually grew around the fortress, but the region remained largely populated by the Mari people. The town had a fair specializing in wooden and wicker ware goods produced by local craftsmen. The town was very active during summer, but winters brought a halt to river traffic.

In the 19th century, Kozmodemyansk was a more important trading place along the Volga than the neighboring towns of Vasilsursk and Cheboksary. It was a typical halfway "overnight" stop for the Volga River steamers between Nizhny Novgorod and Kazan. In the 20th century, the town developed industrially. According to the official Imperial Russian statistics, on January 1 (14), 1913, the population was 5,500, of which 97.5% were Russians.

In 1918, there was a dispute between Mari and Chuvash representatives of Kozmodemyansk in the Idel-Ural Movement. It was not decided to which proposed state (Mariland or Chuvashia) the town, as well as the surrounding countryside, should be merged. A few rare mentions which have remained show that the Volga was to become the border between Chuvashia and Mariland, with considerable cultural and political autonomy (after the example of the status of the Grand Duchy of Finland in the Russian Empire) given to the Hill Mari minority on the south side of the Volga in Chuvashia (according to the preserved papers from the Meeting of Representatives of the Minority Peoples on May 15, 1917 and Idel-Ural State.

== Administrative and municipal status ==
Within the framework of administrative divisions, Kozmodemyansk serves as the administrative center of Gornomariysky District, even though it is not a part of it. As an administrative division, it is incorporated separately as the town of republic significance of Kozmodemyansk—an administrative unit with the status equal to that of the districts. As a municipal division, the town of republic significance of Kozmodemyansk is incorporated as Kozmodemyansk Urban Okrug.

== Museums ==
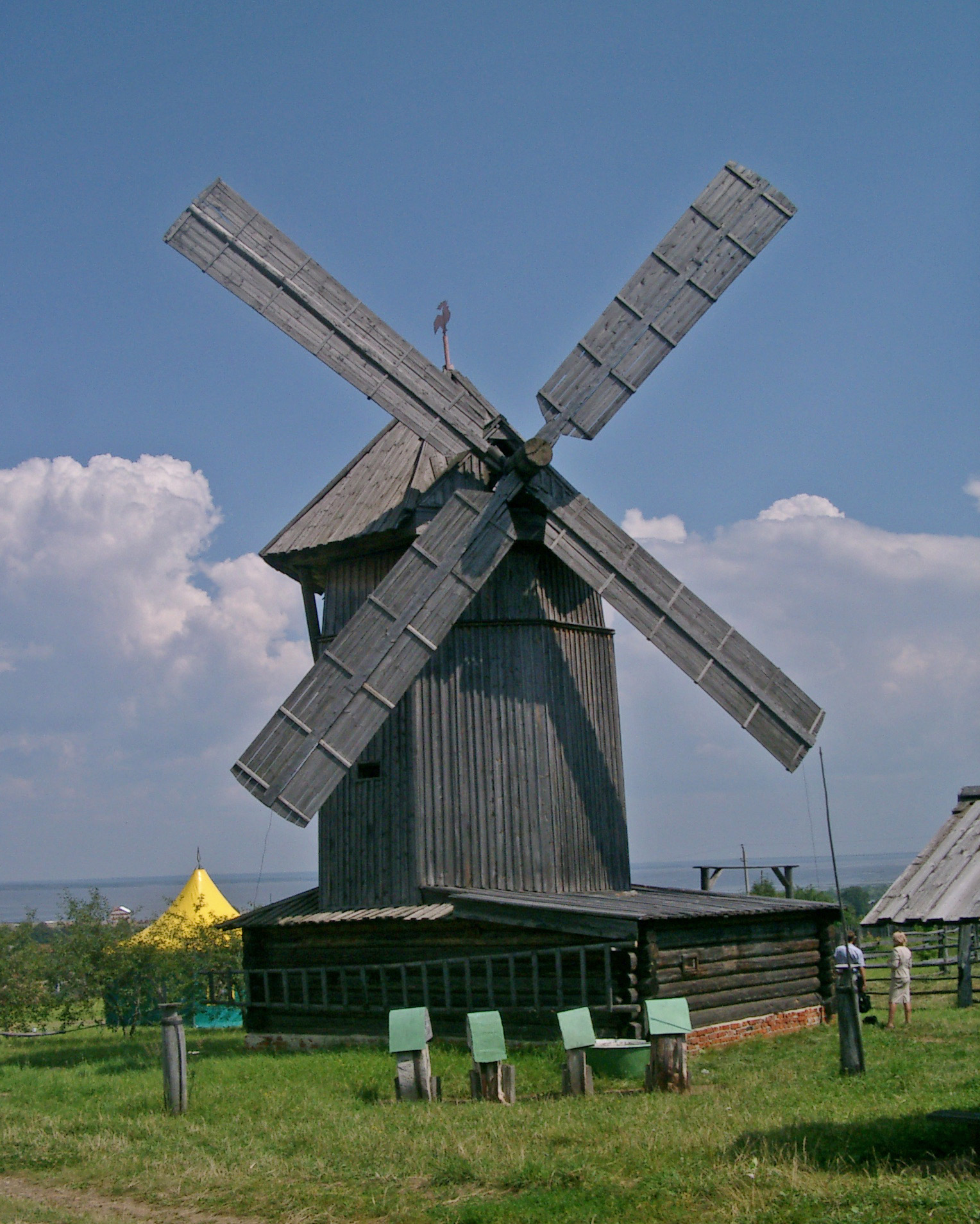
Windmill in the Mari Ethnographic Museum

A local museum was opened in 1919 and now contains paintings by many Mari and Russian artists. A regional museum to preserve artifacts of the Mari culture was opened in 1979. An open-air ethnographic museum opened in 1983. It contains over sixty varied buildings typical of Russian/Mari culture. They house over 2,000 exhibits of artisan craft and tools. Even the variety of fences around the grounds display typical Mari designs.

== Notable people ==
- Andrei Eshpai (1925–2015), ethnic Mari composer, awarded the title of People's Artist of the USSR
