= Alho Alhoniemi =

Finnish linguist

Alho Alhoniemi (born 1933 in Suomussalmi) is a Finnish linguist specializing in the Finno-Ugric languages.

Alhoniemi graduated from high school in 1952 in Kannus. He obtained his PhD in 1967 with a thesis about the lative case in Mari and served as professor of Finno-Ugric linguistics at the University of Turku from 1971 to 1996. He was appointed member of the Finnish Academy of Science and Letters in 1981 and received an honorary doctorate from Uppsala University in 1994. He served as chairman of the Society for the Finnish Language (Suomen Kielen Seura) from 1971 to 1979.

His research interests include the syntax of the Mari and Mordvinic languages. In 1985, he published an extensive grammar of Mari in Finnish, which was translated into German in 1993.
