= Gornomariysky District =

Gornomariysky District Горномарийский район (Russian)
- District

Other transcription(s)
  - Meadow Mari: Курыкмарий кундем
  - Hill Mari: Кырык мары кымдем
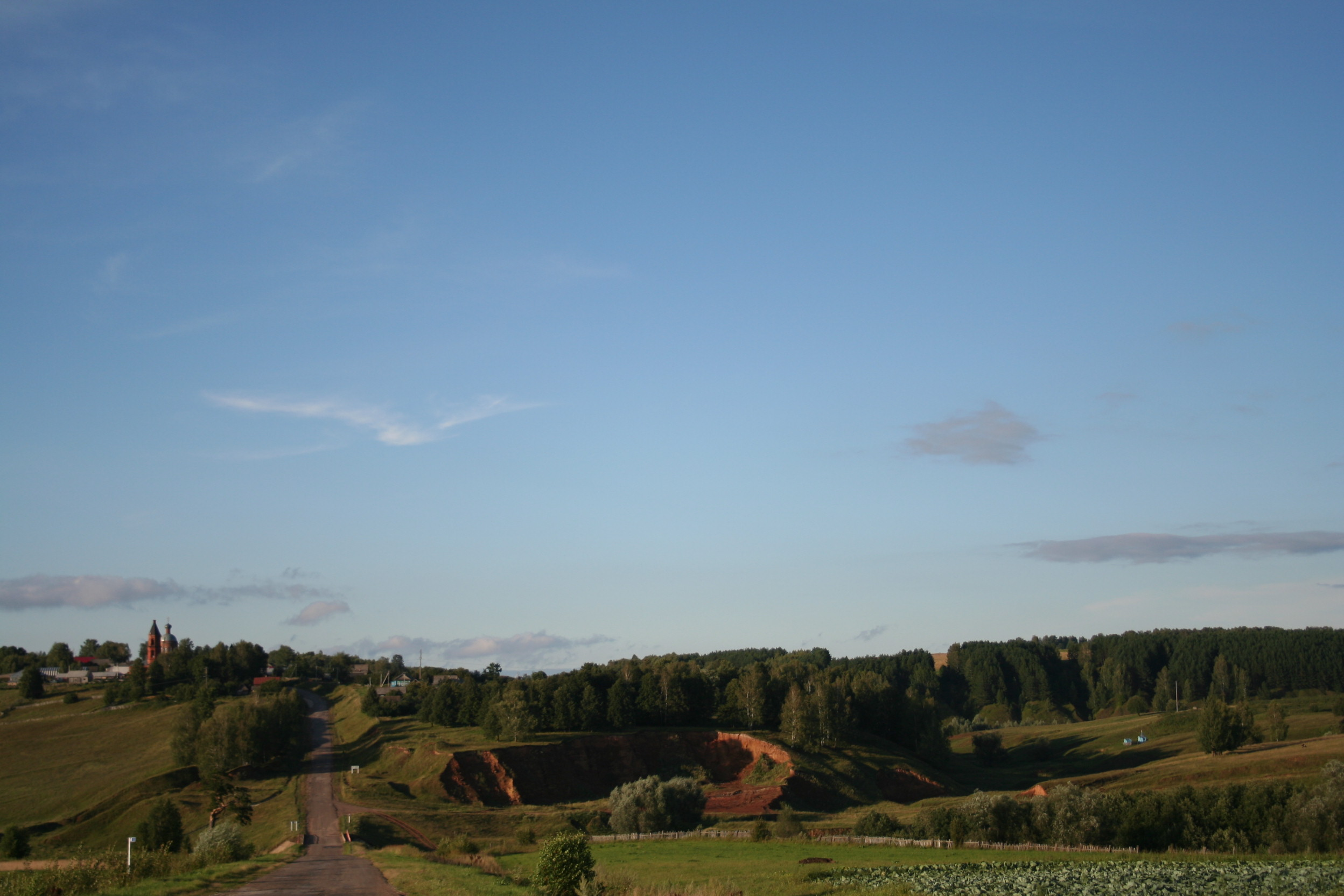
- The selo of Paygusovo in Gornomariysky District

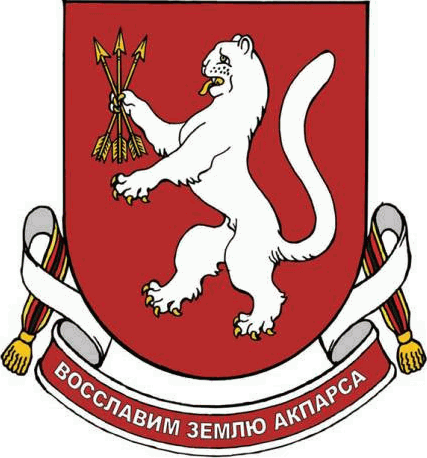
- Flag Coat of arms
- Location of Gornomariysky District in the Mari El Republic
- Coordinates: 56.325°N 45.777°E
- Country: Russia
- Federal subject: Mari El Republic
- Administrative center: Kozmodemyansk

Area
  - Total: 1,730 km^{2} (670 sq mi)

Population (2010 Census)
  - Total: 25,869
  - Density: 15.0/km^{2} (38.7/sq mi)
  - Urban: 0%
  - Rural: 100%

Administrative structure
  - Administrative divisions: 10 Rural okrugs
  - Inhabited localities: 241 rural localities

Municipal structure
  - Municipally incorporated as: Gornomariysky Municipal District
  - Municipal divisions: 0 urban settlements, 10 rural settlements
- Time zone: UTC+3 (MSK)
- OKTMO ID: 88608000
- Website: http://gornomari.ru

Population of Gornomariysky District
- 2010 Census: 25,869
- 2002 Census: 29,203
- 1989 Census: 32,949
- 1979 Census: 68,476

Gornomariysky District (Russian: Горномари́йский райо́н; Meadow Mari: Курыкмарий кундем, Kurykmarij kundem; Hill Mari: Кырык мары кымдем, Kyryk mary kymdem) is an administrative and municipal district (raion), one of the fourteen in the Mari El Republic, Russia. It is located in the west of the republic and is the only district on the right bank of the Volga River. It borders with Yurinsky District in the north, Kilemarsky District and the Chuvash Republic in the south, and with Nizhny Novgorod Oblast in the west. The area of the district is 1,730 square kilometers (670 sq mi). Its administrative center is the town of Kozmodemyansk (which is not administratively a part of the district). As of the 2010 Census, the total population of the district was 25,869.

== Administrative and municipal status ==
Within the framework of administrative divisions, Gornomariysky District is one of the fourteen in the republic. It is divided into 10 rural okrugs, comprising 241 rural localities. The town of Kozmodemyansk serves as its administrative center, despite being incorporated separately as a town of republic significance—an administrative unit with the status equal to that of the districts.

As a municipal division, the district is incorporated as Gornomariysky Municipal District. Its ten rural okrugs are incorporated as ten rural settlements within the municipal district. The town of republic significance of Kozmodemyansk is incorporated separately from the district as Kozmodemyansk Urban Okrug, but serves as the administrative center of the municipal district as well.

== Demographics ==
The district is a home of Hill Mari people, and the Hill Mari language is spoken there.

== See also ==
- Mari Depression
