= Meadow Mari people =

Subgroup of Mari people

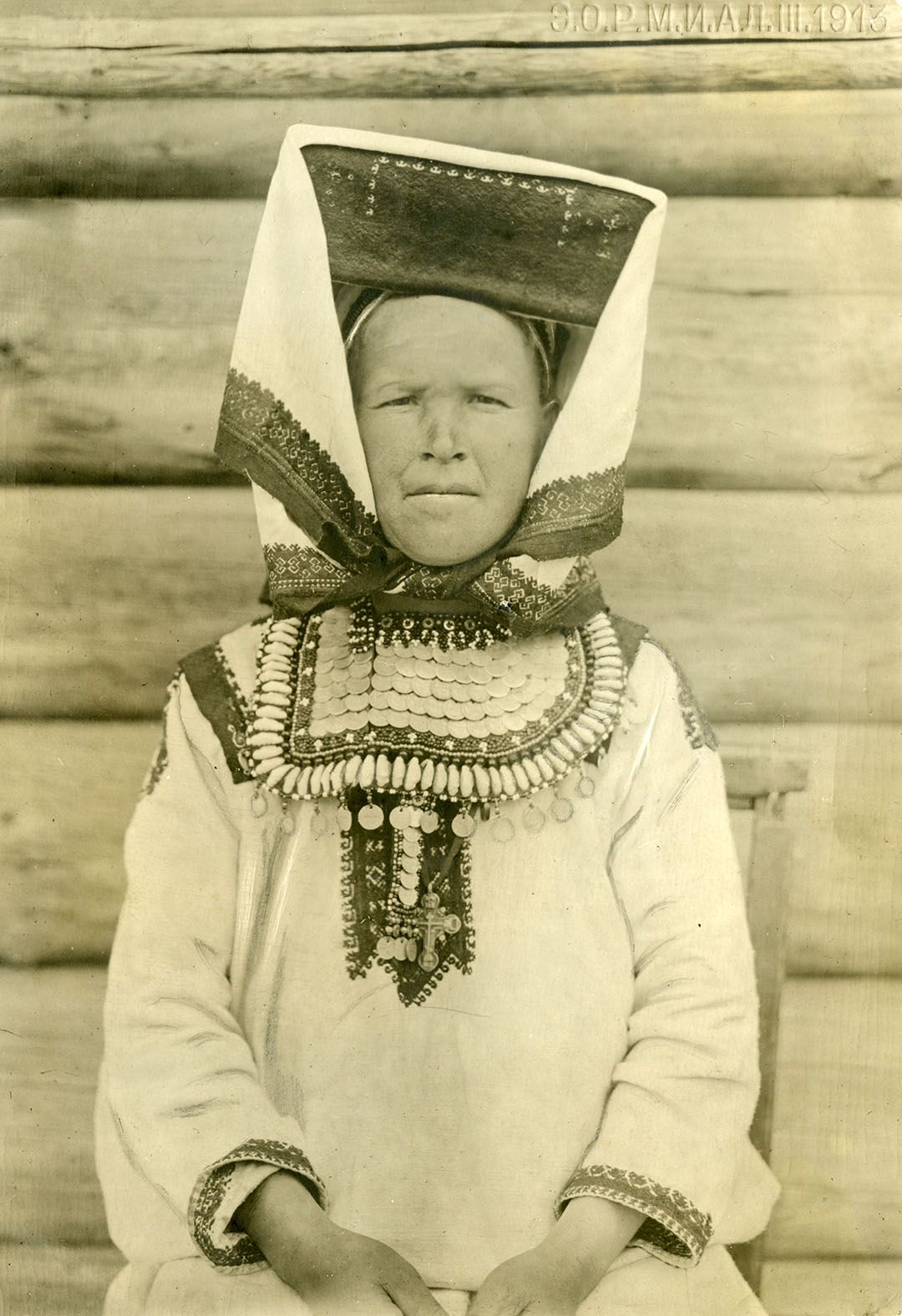
- Meadow Mari woman wearing traditional clothing, c. 1905-1906

Regions with significant populations
- Mari El

Languages
- Meadow Mari language

The Meadow Mari are a subgroup of the Mari people, a Volga Finnic ethnic group concentrated in the republic of Mari El in Russia. Meadow Mari comprise the majority of Mari in the Mari El republic. They live on the right bank of the Volga river, while the Hill Mari people live on the left bank. The ethnogenesis of these two subgroups, and formation of distinct dialects, probably took place in the 14th century. Meadow Mari comprise the majority of Mari, and their language variety is more widespread than the Hill Mari language. Meadow Mari are often considered to be distinct from the related Eastern Mari living in Tatarstan and Bashkortostan.

Meadow Mari mainly practice traditional Mari religion. They are believed to be descendants of the Azelino culture.
