= Mari people =

Finno-Ugric ethnic group of Eastern Europe

Mari
мари; Марий-влак
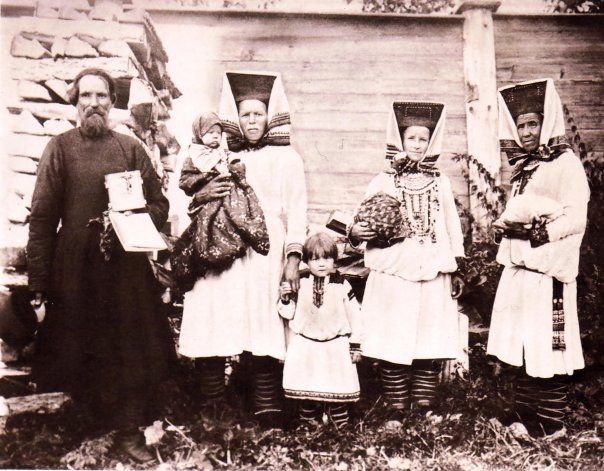
- Meadow Mari family c. 1900

Total population
- c. 600,000

Regions with significant populations
- Russia: 423,803
- Mari El: 246,560
- Kazakhstan: 5,289
- Ukraine: 4,130
- Belarus: 416
- Estonia: 241
- Latvia: 234

Languages
- Mari; Russian

Religion
- Russian Orthodoxy; Mari religion

Related ethnic groups
- Mordvinians (Moksha and Erzya), Udmurts, Chuvash

The Mari (/ˈmɑːri/ MAR-ee), (Note: Mari: мари [mɑˈɾi]; Meadow Mari: Марий-влак, romanized: Marij-vlak; Russian: марийцы, IPA: [mɐˈrʲijtsɨ]) also formerly known as the Cheremis or Cheremisses, (Note: Russian: черемисы, romanized: cheremisy.) are a Finno-Ugric people in Eastern Europe, who have traditionally lived along the Volga and Kama rivers in Russia. They live mostly in the Mari El republic, with significant minorities in Bashkortostan, Perm Krai, Tatarstan and Udmurtia. Mari make up 40.1% of the population of Mari El.

== Name ==
The ethnic name mari derives from the Proto-Indo-Iranian root *márya-, meaning 'human', literally 'mortal', which indicates early contacts between Finno-Ugric and Indo-Iranian languages.

== Subgroups ==
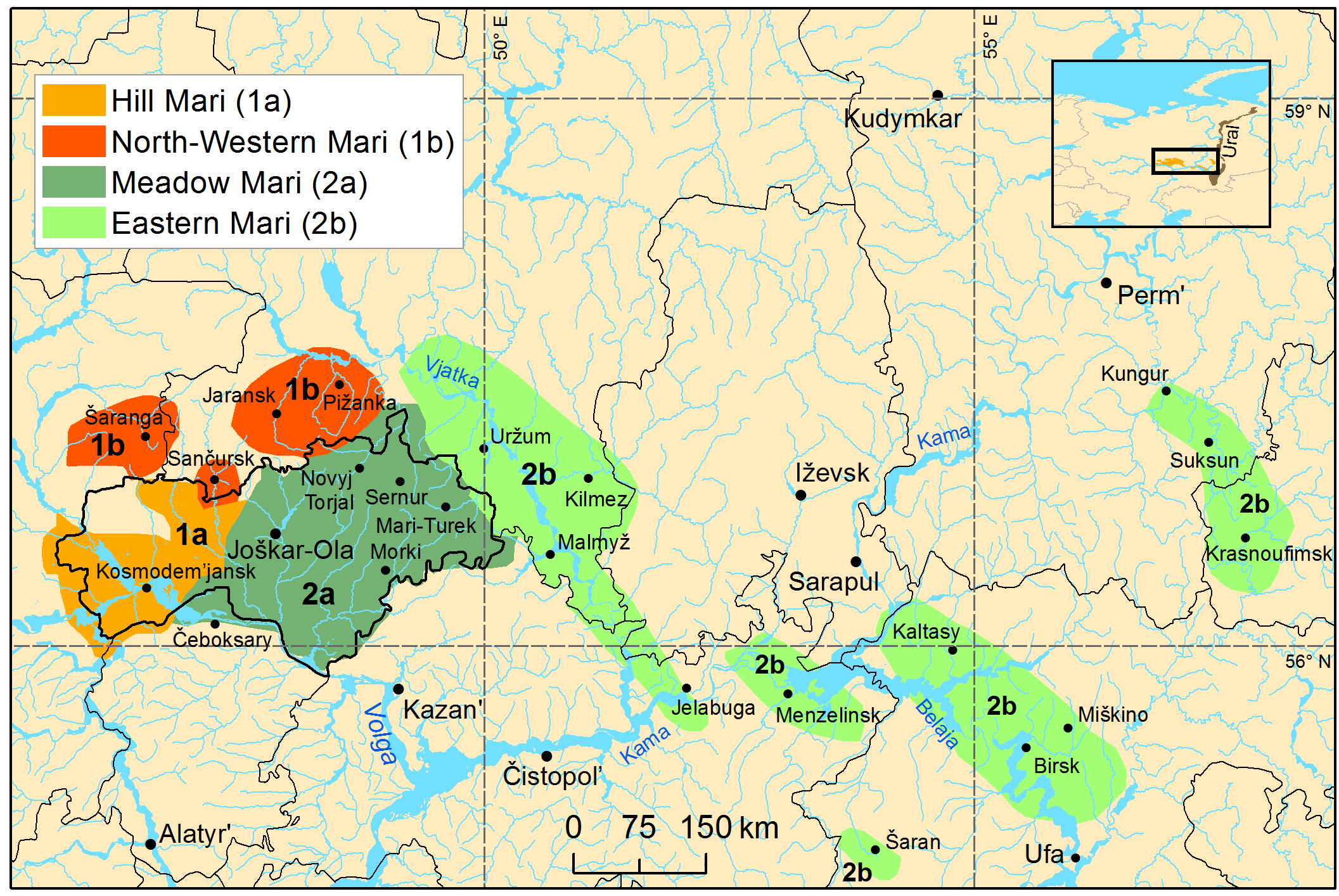
Distribution of Mari languages at the beginning of the 20th century

There are two main ethnographic subgroups of Mari people: Meadow Mari, who live on the right bank of the Volga river, and Hill (or Mountain) Mari, who live on the left bank. The ethnogenesis of these two subgroups, and formation of distinct dialects, probably took place in the 14th century. Meadow Mari comprise the majority of Mari, and their language variety is more widespread than the Hill Mari language. The 1995 Law on the Languages of the Republic and the Mari El constitution designate the Hill and Meadow varieties to be, along with Russian, the state languages of the republic.

Since the 19th century a third subgroup has been identified, the Eastern Mari. The Eastern dialect has been considered a variant of the Meadow dialect. Eastern Mari comprise the Mari populations living east of the Vyatka and in the Ural region, particularly in Bashkortostan as well as Sverdlovsk Oblast and Perm Krai. This diaspora group formed after the Cheremis Wars in the 16th century, which caused migration to the east.

Some scholars consider the speakers of Northwestern Mari dialects in Kirov and Nizhny Novgorod Oblasts a separate ethnographic group. The number of Northwestern Mari was estimated to be over 7700 people in 2011. In recent decades, assimilation processes have proceeded quickly among this group, and in 2022 only 58.5% of the Mari in Nizhny Novgorod Oblast spoke the Mari language. According to Saarinen (2022), there are only a few hundred Northwestern Mari speakers.

== History ==
=== Early history ===
Some scholars have proposed that two tribes mentioned by the Gothic writer Jordanes in his Getica among the peoples in the realm of Gothic king Ermanaric in the fourth century AD can be equated with the Mari people. However, the identification of the Imniscaris (or Sremniscans) with "Cheremis", and Merens with "Mari" is controversial. As a result, there is no consensus among scholars. The first safely attested mention of the Mari people comes from Khazar sources from the 10th century, where they appear by the exonym tsarmis. The old Russian name for the Mari (Cheremis) is derived from this. At that time, the Mari settlement area was along the Volga. Mari folklore mentions a legendary hero named Chotkar and the semi-legendary king Chumblat, who ruled around the year 1100. The Russians first encroached on Mari lands in the 12th century, when Novgorod seized the stronghold of Koksharov in 1174. Around 1200, Vladimir-Suzdal gradually took control of the Volga valley down to the mouth of the river Vetulga, and pressure intensified after the founding of Nizhny Novgorod in 1221. The eastern Mari remained subjects of Volga Bulgaria.

Following the Mongol invasions in the 13th century, the Mari fell under the influence sphere of the Golden Horde. Many Bulgars moved north, and so Bulgar influence on the Mari grew. The new Bulgar capital, Kazan, was founded on ancient Mari lands. In the 14th century, Russian pressure grew with increased raids, while the Mari responded with attacks on territories including Vyatka and even Ustyug. As early as 1372, the Russians established an outpost at Kurmysh. In 1443, the Mari became subjects of the Kazan Khanate. During this time, the Mari experienced some cultural convergence with the ruling Tatars and the Volga Bulgars, which is also seen in Turkic lexical and grammatical influence on the Mari language. The founding of the Russian fortress of Vasilgrad in 1523 exposed the Hill Mari to the Russians directly, while language differences weakened their cooperation with the Meadow Mari.

In 1552, the territory of the Mari was incorporated into the Russian state with the Russian conquest of Kazan under Ivan the Terrible. The Hill Mari assisted with the Russian conquest, while most of the Meadow Mari continued to back the Kazan Tatars. Mari resistance continued in what is known in Russian historiography as the "Cheremis Wars", which lasted until 1584. The heaviest periods of fighting occurred during 1553–1557, 1570–1572 and 1581–1584. In 1572, the last Siberian khan, Kuchum, sent an army consisting of Bashkirs, Khanty, Mansi and Mari vassals to carry out reconnaissance into the lands held by the Stroganovs and to devastate the settlements there. By the end of the 16th century, resistance was finally quelled, leaving a heavy toll on the Mari population. As a result of the ensuing influx of Russian settlers, and to escape forced Christianization (starting from c. 1700), the Mari started to settle further east in present-day Bashkortostan. In the following centuries under tsarist Russia, the Mari were able to retain their ethnic and cultural identity, reinforced by repeated waves of returning to their traditional pre-Christian religion.

=== Soviet Union ===
During the Soviet Era, the Mari Section was set up under the auspices of Narkomnats, the Peoples Commissariat for nationalities. Its task was to facilitate the close union of the Mari people with other people, to abolish anti-Russian mistrust and to raise the "class consciousness" of Mari workers. In practice this involved facilitating grain requisitions by the Soviet state, the recruitment of soldiers for the Red Army and the implementation of Bolshevik control of the society.

Until the 1930s, the Mari people had no cultural ties to Russia and were able to maintain its own culture and identity, as cultural interaction with Russia was "limited to the payment of tributes and taxes". However, intensive Russification policies were introduced during the Soviet era – the Mari language was eliminated from schools and only Russian was taught instead, many Mari people were resettled and sent to work in remote parts of the Soviet Union, and Mari communities were forcibly enlarged under the Soviet policy of eliminating "unpromising villages", leading to Russian settlement and greatly disempowering the indigenous population. The Mari Autonomous Soviet Socialist Republic was subjected to one of the harshest Russification measures in the USSR. Furthermore, Bolshevik policies officially aimed at combating undue influence of nationalism in a multi-nation union, resulted in the murder of leading Mari figures, such as Sergei Čavajn and Olyk Ipai and other teachers, scientists, artists, as well as religious and community leaders.

=== Russian Federation ===
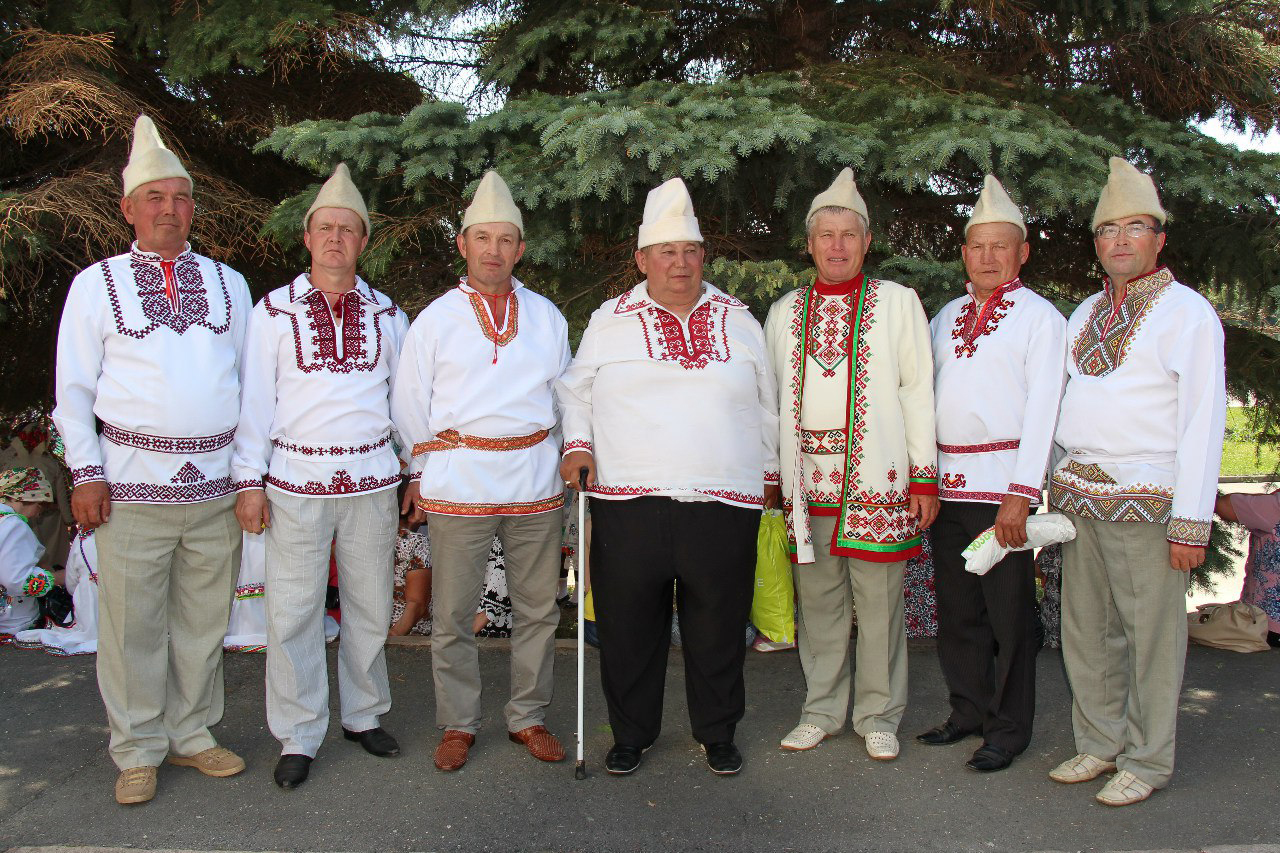
Mari pagan priests (kart)

Following the collapse of the Soviet Union, the newly created republic of Mari El saw a revival of Mari culture and language. However, following the appointment of Leonid Markelov as Head of the republic in 2001, the government of Mari El has pursued a policy of intense Russification in the region. According to Vasily Pekteyev of the Mari National Theater in Yoshkar-Ola, "[Markelov] hated the Mari people". He noted that the Mari language is no longer taught in villages or schools and that the republic of Mari El "has already ceased to be an ethnic republic in anything but name. We are just another oblast." In 2005, the European Commission expressed its concern over reports of repression against ethnic Mari opposition figures, journalists, and government officials that promoted Mari culture and opposed Markelov's reappointment as head of the republic that year.

== Language ==
Dialect map of the Mari language, c. 1976. Hill Mari Northwestern Mari Meadow Mari Eastern Mari

The Mari language belongs to the Uralic language family. It is pluricentric with two literary standards: Hill Mari and Meadow-Eastern Mari. Both literary forms have official status in Mari El and are taught in schools. The Meadow-Eastern standard is more widely spoken than the Hill standard, although both are considered endangered. Four main vernacular dialects have been distinguished: Hill Mari, Meadow Mari, Eastern Mari, and Northwestern Mari.

The Mari language began developing independently around 3,000 years ago, and was in contact with Chuvash and Tatar by the first millennium CE.

At the 2002 census, 451,033 people stated that they spoke the Mari language.

== Religion ==
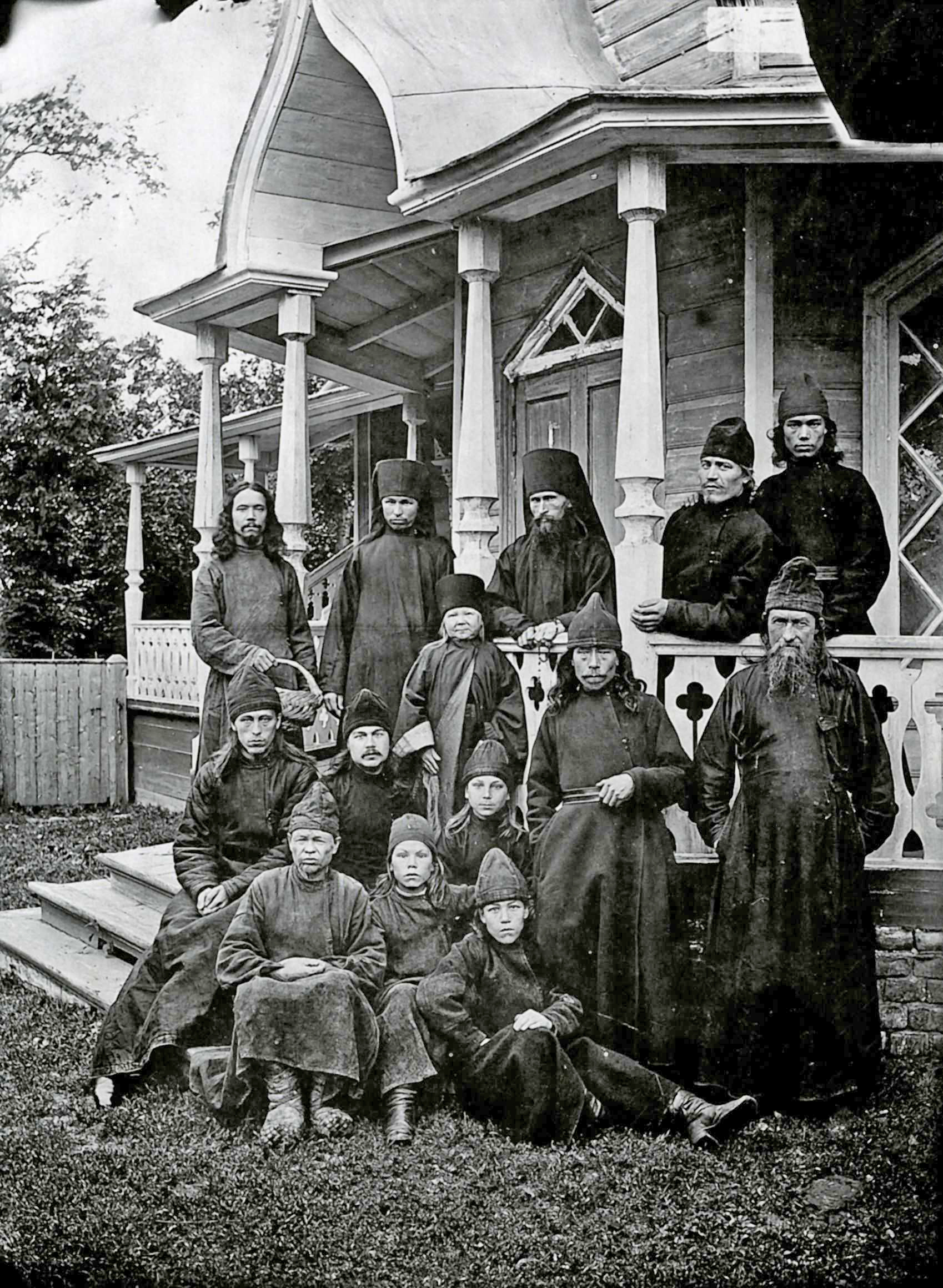
Mari orthodox monks and novices. 1894

Maris have traditionally practiced a shamanistic faith that closely connected the individual with nature. According to those beliefs, nature exerts an influence over people. Nature is seen as a sacred, powerful, and living being with which people are fully intertwined. Nature also serves as a source of absolute good who always helps humans as long as they refrain from harming or opposing it. The indigenous religion of the Mari people is the most important element of their national identity and tradition; speaking of their faith, many Mari intellectuals concluded that "to kill our faith means to kill us".

The Mari native religion also possesses a pantheon of gods who reside in the heavens, the most important of whom is known as the Great White God (Ош Кугу Юмо, Osh Kugu Yumo). Other lesser gods include the god of fire (Тул Юмо, Tul Yumo) and the god of wind (Мардеж Юмо, Mardezh Yumo). The Mari also believe in a number of half-men, half-gods (керемет, keremet) who live on earth. The most revered of these is Chumbulat (Чумбулат), or Chumbylat (Чумбылат), a renowned leader and warrior. Attempts to convert the Maris to Christianity began in the 16th century after their territory was incorporated into the Russian state during the reign of Ivan IV ("the Terrible"). Pressure to convert to Christianity and adopt Russian culture by the tsarist authorities in the 17th and 18th century led to backlash by the Maris as they faced persecution to conform. While the Mari people nominally converted to Russian Orthodoxy in the 16th century, in practice they kept to their old practices relatively unhindered, and the interaction with Christianity spurred growth of syncretic form of religions where Christian system of belief is combined with pagan traditions and rituals. The Eastern Mari in particular were able to preserve the Mari religion due to them living in isolated communities.

Many Mari today still practice paganism in syncretic forms, or purer forms adhering to organized neopagan Mari traditional religion organizations. While most Mari today are members of the Russian Orthodox Church, pagans still comprise a significant minority of around 25%. Mari paganism is divided into three groups: Chimari are non-baptized Mari pagans who do not participate in Christian traditions; Marla Vera (also known as "dual faith") are baptized Mari who follow pagan traditions while also attending Christian services and celebrating Christian feasts; and Kugu Sorta, adherents of a neopagan revivalist movement which rejects Christianity altogether in favour of purist paganism. About 60% of Mari pagans belong to the syncretic Marla Vera group, while the remaining 40% is composed of Chimari and Kugu Sorta pagans.

== Culture ==
Mari culture has a many-stringed zither called the kusle and a bagpipe called the shyuvr. Mari musical traditions include lyrics that mention the Volga and reflect the Mari adoration of nature, especially forests and rainbows.

21st-century Mari poets include Albertina Ivanova.

== Genetics ==
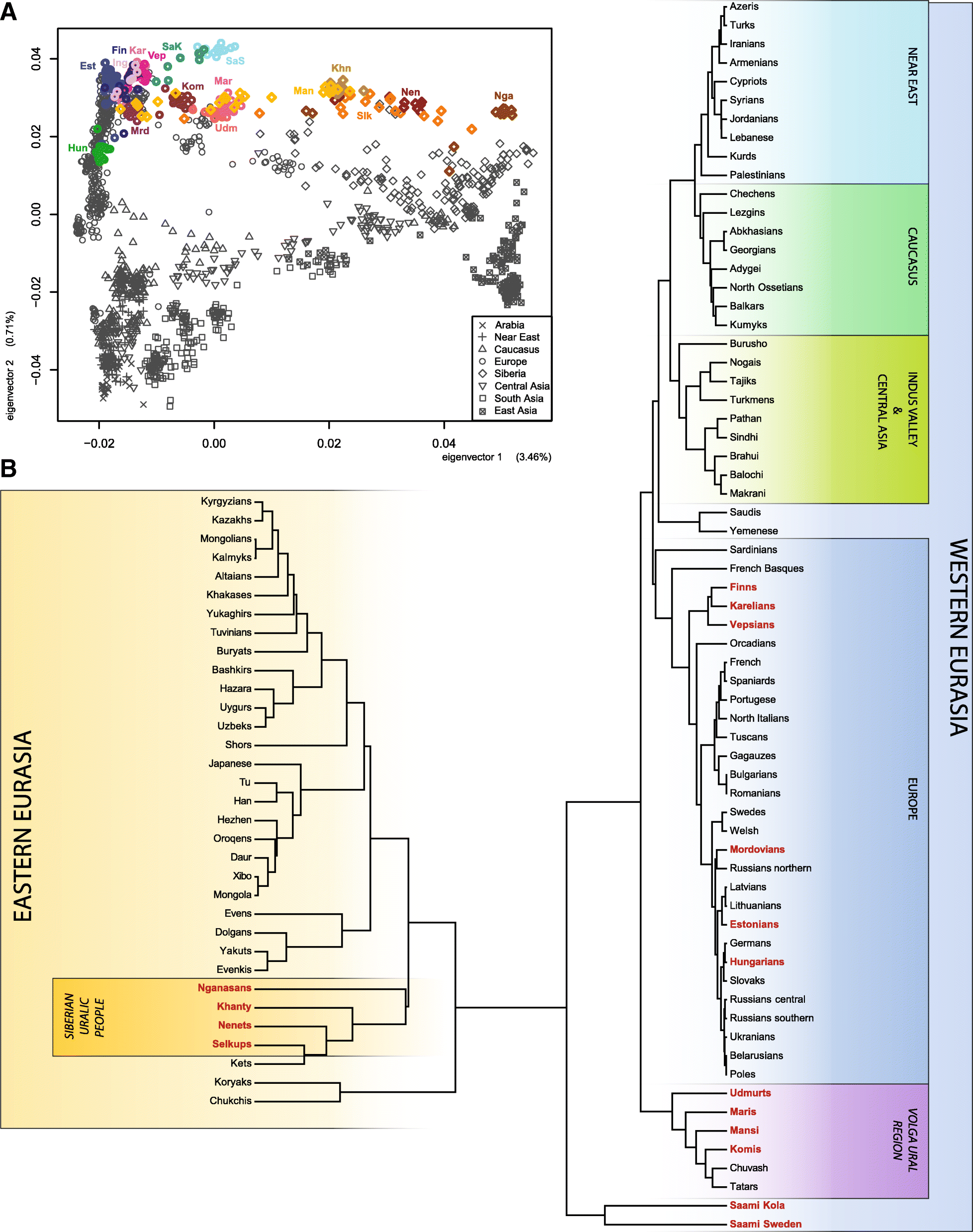
PCA and genetic distances of Uralic-speaking populations

The first or second common Y-chromosomal haplogroup among Mari people is N, which is frequently found within Uralic-speaking peoples and has its roots in East Eurasia. According to the data gathered by Kristiina Tambets and others in their 2018 study, 46.4 percent of Mari men have N-M178, and 8.2 percent belong to the subclade N-P43, in Tambets' older dataset of 111 Mari men, 41.4% of Mari men had subclades of N. R1a is the other dominant Y-DNA haplogroup for Maris, as it is carried by 22.7-47.7 percent of them.

A 2002 study about mtDNA haplogroups in the Volga-Ural region found that 40 percent of the Maris belong to the haplogroup H. About one in four carry the haplogroup U (14 percent have the subclade U5 and about 10 percent have U4).

Autosomally, Mari people stand out as an ethnic group in Europe by having a high level of Siberian-related admixture. Tambets and others estimated that it is 35 percent of their ancestry. This Nganasan-like Siberian component is typical for Uralic-speaking groups.

== Notable people ==
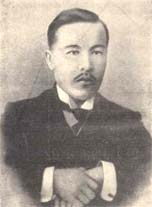
Ivan Palantai

- Ivan Palantai, composer
- Grigoriy Andreyev, marathon runner
- Andrei Andreyevich Eshpai, film director, screenwriter and producer
- Vyacheslav Bykov, former professional ice hockey player and a former head coach of the Russian national hockey team.
- Ivan Valeev, singer and rapper
- Oleg Taktarov, actor and retired mixed martial artist. He was a practitioner of Sambo and Judo
- Albertina Ivanova, poet

== See also ==
- Mari Ushem
