= Gaspar Ariño Ortiz =

Spanish lawyer, professor, and politician (1936–2023)

Member of the Congress of Deputies for Valencia
- In office 21 November 1989 – 13 April 1993

Personal details
- Born: 6 January 1936 Utiel, Spain
- Died: 5 January 2023 (aged 86) Madrid, Spain
- Party: PP
- Education: University of Valencia; University of Madrid; Brookings Institution
- Occupation: Lawyer; Professor

Gaspar Ariño Ortiz (6 January 1936 – 5 January 2023) was a Spanish lawyer, professor, and politician. A member of the People's Party, he served in the Congress of Deputies from 1989 to 1993.

Ariño died in Madrid on 5 January 2023, at the age of 86.
