= Tuzhinsky District =

Tuzhinsky District Тужинский район (Russian)
- District
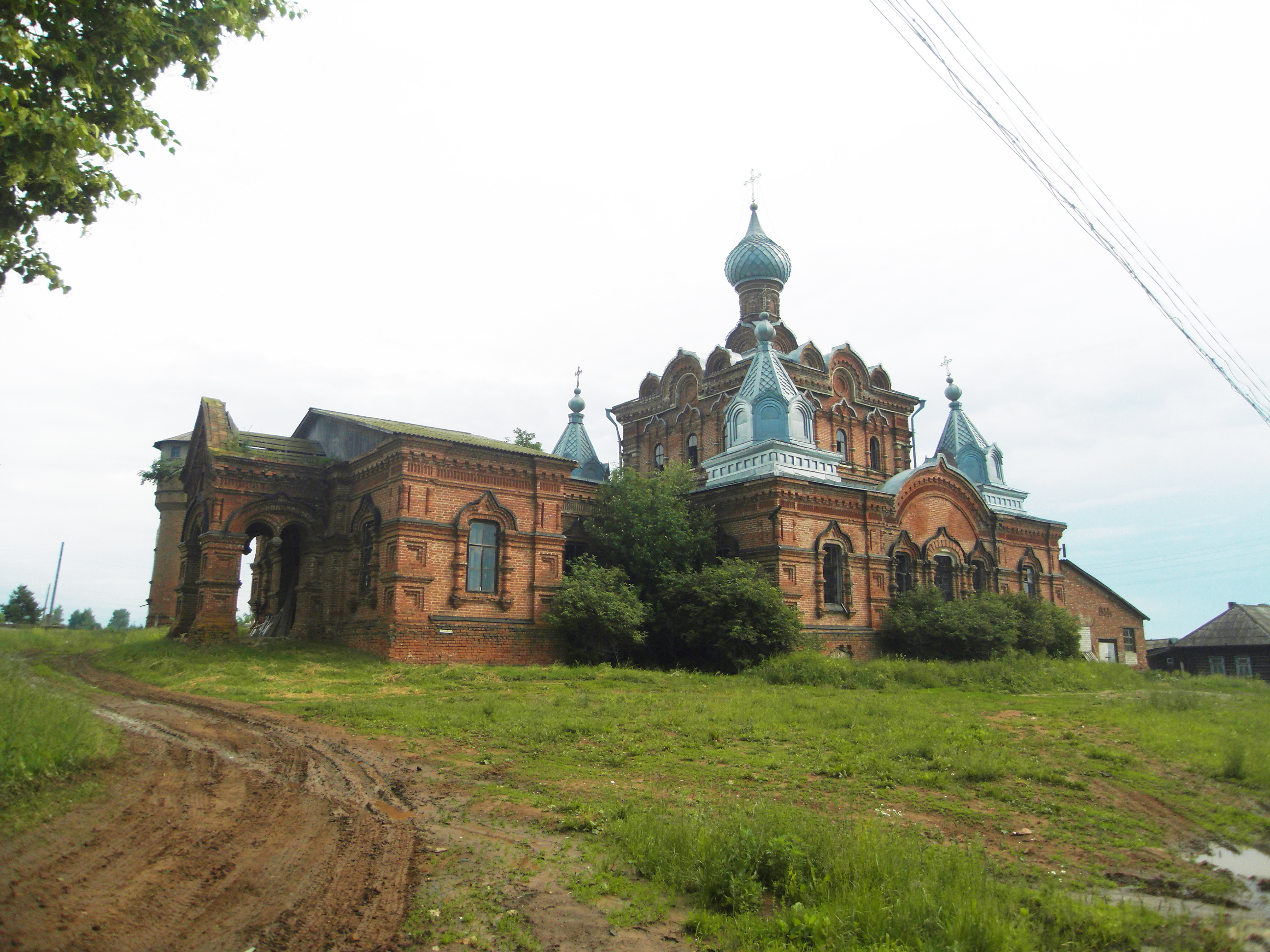
- The Church of St. John Chrysostom in Nyr, Tuzhinsky District

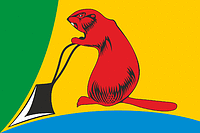
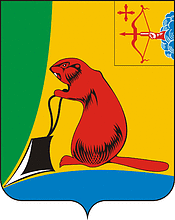
- Flag Coat of arms
- Location of Tuzhinsky District in Kirov Oblast
- Coordinates: 57°36′38″N 47°55′37″E
- Country: Russia
- Federal subject: Kirov Oblast
- Established: 15 July 1929
- Administrative center: Tuzha

Area
  - Total: 1,468 km^{2} (567 sq mi)

Population (2010 Census)
  - Total: 7,688
  - Density: 5.237/km^{2} (13.56/sq mi)
  - Urban: 59.4%
  - Rural: 40.6%

Administrative structure
  - Administrative divisions: 1 Urban-type settlements, 4 Rural okrugs
  - Inhabited localities: 1 urban-type settlements, 54 rural localities

Municipal structure
  - Municipally incorporated as: Tuzhinsky Municipal District
  - Municipal divisions: 1 urban settlements, 4 rural settlements
- Time zone: UTC+3 (MSK)
- OKTMO ID: 33638000
- Website: http://www.kirovreg.ru/region/regionmap/index.php?ID=4362

Tuzhinsky District (Russian: Тужи́нский райо́н) is an administrative and municipal district (raion), one of the thirty-nine in Kirov Oblast, Russia. It is located in the southwest of the oblast. The area of the district is 1,468 square kilometers (567 sq mi). Its administrative center is the urban locality (an urban-type settlement) of Tuzha. Population: 7,688 (2010 census); 10,396 (2002 Census); 12,334 (1989 Soviet census). The population of Tuzha accounts for 59.4% of the district's total population.
