= Kilemarsky District =

Kilemarsky District Килемарский район (Russian)
- District

Other transcription(s)
  - Hill Mari: Кӹлемар кундем
  - Meadow Mari: Килемар кундем
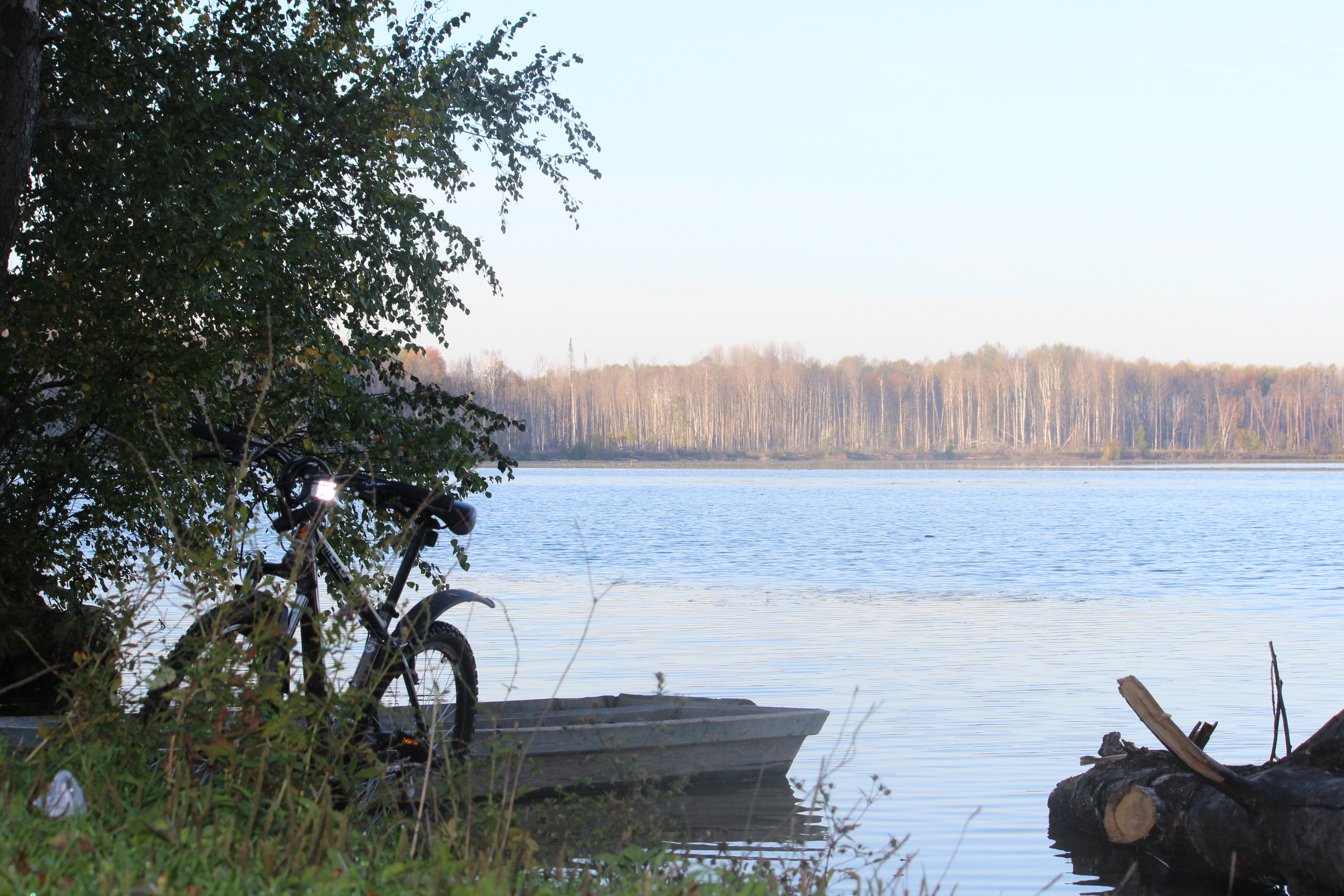
- Lake Shamyary, a protected area of Russian in Kilemarsky District

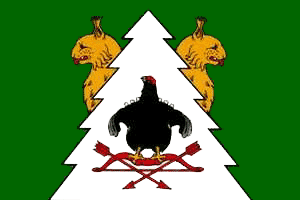
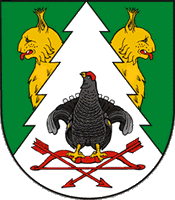
- Flag Coat of arms
- Location of Kilemarsky District in the Mari El Republic
- Coordinates: 56.591°N 46.224°E
- Country: Russia
- Federal subject: Mari El Republic
- Established: 26 August 1939
- Administrative center: Kilemary

Area
  - Total: 3,255 km^{2} (1,257 sq mi)

Population (2010 Census)
  - Total: 13,604
  - Density: 4.179/km^{2} (10.82/sq mi)
  - Urban: 29.9%
  - Rural: 70.1%

Administrative structure
  - Administrative divisions: 1 Urban-type settlements, 8 Rural okrugs
  - Inhabited localities: 1 urban-type settlements, 77 rural localities

Municipal structure
  - Municipally incorporated as: Kilemarsky Municipal District
  - Municipal divisions: 1 urban settlements, 8 rural settlements
- Time zone: UTC+3 (MSK)
- OKTMO ID: 88616000
- Website: http://mari-el.gov.ru/kilemary/Pages/main.aspx

Population of Kilemarsky District
- 2010 Census: 13,604
- 2002 Census: 14,130
- 1989 Census: 16,684
- 1979 Census: 9,250

Kilemarsky District (Russian: Килема́рский райо́н; Hill Mari: Кӹлемар кымдем, Kÿlemar kymdem; Meadow Mari: Килемар кундем, Kilemar kundem) is an administrative and municipal district (raion), one of the fourteen in the Mari El Republic, Russia. It is located in the west of the republic. The area of the district is 3,255 square kilometers (1,257 sq mi). Its administrative center is the urban locality (an urban-type settlement) of Kilemary. As of the 2010 Census, the total population of the district was 13,604, with the population of Kilemary accounting for 29.9% of that number.

== Administrative and municipal status ==
Within the framework of administrative divisions, Kilemarsky District is one of the fourteen in the republic. It is divided into one urban-type settlement (an administrative division with the administrative center in the urban-type settlement (inhabited locality) of Kilemary) and eight rural okrugs, all of which comprise seventy-seven rural localities. As a municipal division, the district is incorporated as Kilemarsky Municipal District. Kilemary Urban-Type Settlement is incorporated into an urban settlement, and the eight rural okrugs are incorporated into eight rural settlements within the municipal district. The urban-type settlement of Kilemary serves as the administrative center of both the administrative and municipal district.
