= Tuzha =

Tuzha Тужа
- Urban-type settlement
- Interactive map of Tuzha
- Location of Tuzha Tuzha (Kirov Oblast)
- Coordinates: 57.6062°N 47.9367°E
- Country: Russia
- Federal subject: Kirov Oblast
- Administrative district: Tuzhinsky District
- Founded: 1702

Population (2010 Census)
  - Total: 4,568
  - Estimate (2025): 3,779 (−17.3%)
- Time zone: UTC+3 (MSK)
- Postal code: 612200
- OKTMO ID: 33638151051

Tuzha (Russian: Тужа) is an urban locality (an urban-type settlement) in Tuzhinsky District of Kirov Oblast, Russia. Population: 4,568 (2010 census); 5,159 (2002 census); 5,491 (1989 Soviet census).
