= Sergei Chavain =

Mari playwright (1888–1937)

- Сергей Чавайн
- Born: Sergei Grigorievich Grigoriev; October 6, 1888; Maliy Karamas, Russian Empire
- Died: November 11, 1937 (aged 49); Yoshkar-Ola, Mari ASSR, Russian SFSR, Soviet Union
- Cause of death: executed
- Education: Kazan Teachers' Seminary
- Occupations: poet; dramaturge

Sergei Chavain, also spelled Čavajn (Mari: Серге́й Чава́йн, pronounced [tʃɑˈβɑɪn]; 6 October 1888, Maly Karamas – 11 November 1937) was a Mari poet and playwright, born Sergei Grigorievich Grigoriev (Russian: Серге́й Григо́рьевич Григо́рьев).

In 1905 he wrote the first literary poem in the Mari language, Oto (Ото – The Grove). In 1908 he graduated from Kazan Teachers' Seminary. His first play was The Wild Duck in 1912, a satire of Tsarist bureaucrats. After the October Revolution, Chavain wrote several plays for the first Mari mobile theatre, such as The Autonomy (1920) and The Sun Rises, the Storm-clouds Disappear (1921), inspired by the Revolution and Russian Civil War.

Later he wrote plays for a Mari theatre studio, including Jamblat's Bridge (1927), the comedy The Hundred Roubles Bride-money (1927), the musical drama The Bee-Garden (1928), Kugujar (1929) (a play devoted to the 1905 Revolution), The Live Water (about the formation of kolkhozes), The Timber Mill (1930) (about collectivization), Marii Company (1934) (on the battle for Kazan in 1918)), and Akpatyr (1935) (about Mari participation in Pugachev's Rebellion). The Light of the Coin (1936) was a comedy based on Mari popular beliefs. He translated into Mari several Russian classical plays.

As a writer he is known for his novels: One Can Hear the Noise of the Forest, about the 1905 Revolution, and Elnet, about the life of a pre-revolutionary Mari village.

A victim of the Great Purge during the "struggle with bourgeois nationalism", he was executed in Yoshkar-Ola on 11 November 1937 and was posthumously rehabilitated in 1956. The State prize of Mari El is named after Chavain.

== Sources ==
- (in Russian) Short bio
- (in Russian) Chavain's first poem
