= Eastern Mari people =

Ethnic subgroup of the Mari people

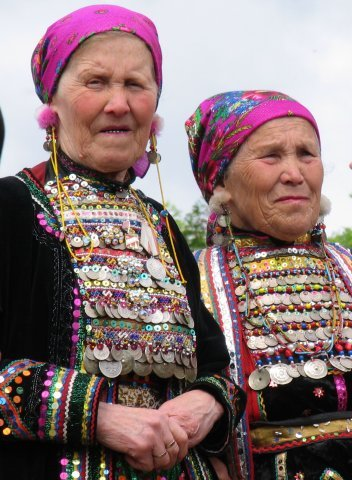
- Mari women of the Ural region

Regions with significant populations
- Bashkortostan; Perm Krai; Sverdlovsk Oblast

Languages
- Eastern Mari language

The Eastern Mari are a subgroup of the Mari people, a Volga Finnic ethnic group of Russia. Eastern Mari comprise those Mari living outside of the Mari El Republic, east of the Vyatka River in the Kama and Ural regions. They are concentrated in Bashkortostan, particularly in the Mishkinsky District, Birsky District, and in Neftekamsk. Eastern Mari populations are also found in southern Sverdlovsk Oblast and in Perm Krai. They make up between a quarter and a third of the general Mari population. According to academic Seppo Lallukka, Eastern Mari is more of a scholarly category than an ethnically unified subgroup.

The Eastern Mari language variety includes loanwords and influence from Russian, Tatar, and Bashkir.

== Culture ==
About two thirds of Eastern Mari live in rural areas, and they are traditionally farmers. Folk religion is an important part of daily life for the Mari of the Ural region, and they preserve many rituals that have been lost among other Mari groups. Similarly to Meadow Mari, Ural Mari have a pronounced emphasis on traditional familial principles compared to neighboring ethnic groups.

Mari in Bashkortostan mainly practice a syncretic combination of Russian Orthodoxy and traditional Mari religion, although Finnish Lutheran missionary efforts have established several Lutheran Mari communities in the republic which incorporate aspects of traditional Mari culture.

== Bibliography ==
- Berezina, Anna (2021). "Повседневные культурные практики уральских мари" [Everyday cultural practices of the Ural Mari]. Finno-Ugric World (in Russian). 13 (1): 67–78. doi:10.15507/2076-2577.013.2021.01.67-78.
- Ivanova, O. M.; Bilalova, L. M.; Guriev, E. A.; Gareev, I. S. (2018). The Eastern Mari Culture as Sinergy of Tolerance and Identity (PDF). 12th International Scientific and Practical Conference "Science and Society". London. pp. 209–222.
- Ivanova, O. M.; Guriev, E. A.; Bilalova, L. M.; Gareev, I. S. (2020). "Socio–cultural existence of modern East Mary subethnos". Amazonia Investiga. 9 (28): 311–319. doi:10.34069/AI/2020.28.04.35. ISSN 2322-6307.
- Klyashev, Alexander; Sadikov, Ranus (2024). "Syncretism and Identity: The Integration of Lutheranism among the Mari People of Bashkortostan, Russia". Journal of Contemporary Rituals and Traditions. 2 (2): 109–138. doi:10.15575/jcrt.373. ISSN 2988-5884.
