= Mari language =

Uralic language

Mari
- Cheremis
- марий йылме marij jylme
- Pronunciation: [mɑˈɾij ˈjəlme]
- Region: Russian Federation: autonomous republics Mari El, Bashkortostan, Tatarstan, Udmurtia; oblasti Nizhny Novgorod, Kirov, Sverdlovsk, Orenburg; Perm Krai
- Ethnicity: 548,000 Mari (2010 census)
- Native speakers: 320,000 (2020)
- Language family: Uralic: Mari
- Dialects: Eastern Mari • Eastern • Meadow; Western Mari • Hill • Northwestern; ?Merya † (unattested)

Official status
- Official language in: Russia: Mari El

Language codes
- ISO 639-2: chm
- ISO 639-3: chm – inclusive code Individual codes: mhr – Meadow (Eastern Mari) mrj – Hill Mari (Western Mari)
- Glottolog: mari1278
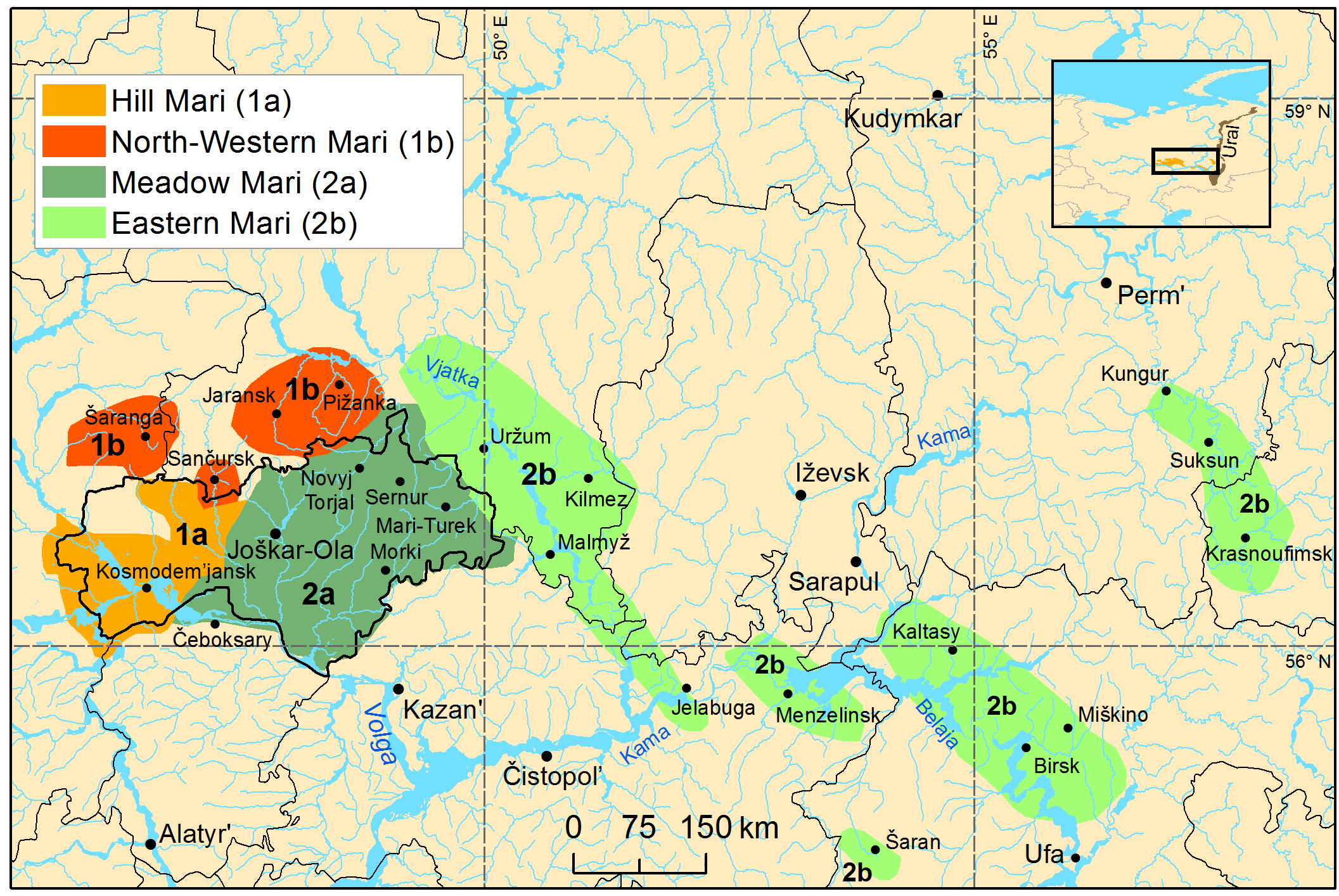
- Geographic distribution of Mari languages at the beginning of the 20th century

- People: Mari
- Language: Marij
- Country: Mari El

The Mari language (марий йылме, IPA: [mɑˈɾij ˈjəlme]; Russian: марийский язык, IPA: [mɐˈrʲijskʲɪj jɪˈzɨk]), formerly known as the Cheremiss language, spoken by approximately 400,000 people, belongs to the Uralic language family. It is spoken primarily in the Mari Republic of the Russian Federation, as well as in the area along the Vyatka river basin and eastwards to the Urals. Mari speakers, known as the Mari, are found also in the Tatarstan, Bashkortostan, Udmurtia, and Perm regions.

Mari is the titular and official language of its republic, alongside Russian.

The Mari language today has three standard forms: Hill Mari, Northwestern Mari, and Meadow Mari. The latter is predominant and spans the continuum Meadow Mari to Eastern Mari from the Republic into the Ural dialects of Bashkortostan, Sverdlovsk Oblast and Udmurtia), whereas the former, Hill Mari, shares a stronger affiliation with the Northwestern dialect (spoken in the Nizhny Novgorod Oblast and parts of the Kirov Oblast). Both language forms use modified versions of Cyrillic script. For the non-native, Hill Mari, or Western Mari, can be recognised by its use of the special letters "ӓ" and "ӹ" in addition to the shared letters "ӱ" and "ӧ", while Eastern and Meadow Mari utilise a special letter "ҥ".

The use of two "variants", as opposed to two "languages", has been debated: Maris recognise the unity of the ethnic group, and the two forms are very close, but distinct enough to cause some problems with communication.

== Ethnonym and glottonym ==
The Mari language and people were known as "Cheremis" (Russian: черемисы, черемисский язык, cheremisy, cheremisskiy yazyk). In medieval texts the variant forms Sarmys and Tsarmys are also found, as well as Tatar: Чирмеш, romanized: Çirmeş; and Chuvash: Ҫармӑс, Śarmăs before the Russian Revolution. The term Mari comes from the Maris' autonym марий (mari).

== Sociolinguistic situation ==
Most Maris live in rural areas with slightly more than a quarter living in cities. In the republic's capital, Yoshkar-Ola, the percentage of Maris is just over 23 percent. At the end of the 1980s (per the 1989 census) Maris numbered 670,868, of whom 80% (542,160) claimed Mari as their first language and 18.8% did not speak Mari. In the Mari Republic, 11.6% claimed Mari was not their first language. In a survey by the Mari Research Institute more than three quarters of Maris surveyed considered Mari language to be the most crucial marker of ethnic identity, followed by traditional culture (61%) and common historical past (22%), religion (16%), character and mentality (15%) and appearance (11%) (see Glukhov and Glukhov for details). A gradual downward trend towards assimilation to Russian has been noted for the Communist period: the 1926 census indicated more than 99% of Maris considered Mari their first language, declining to less than 81% in 1989. Some qualitative evidence of a reversal in recent years has been noted.

There was no state support for Mari language in Imperial Russia, and with the exception of some enthusiasts and numerous ecclesiastical texts by the Russian Orthodox Church, there was almost no education in Mari language. After the October Revolution, there was a period of support of all lesser national cultures in the Soviet Union, but eventually Russification returned. While the development of Mari literary language continued, still, only elementary-school education was available in Mari in the Soviet period, with this policy ending in village schools in the 1970–1980s. The period of glasnost and perestroika in the 1990s opened opportunities for a revival of efforts expand the use of Mari in education and the public sphere. In the 1990s, the Mari language, alongside Russian, was proclaimed in the republican constitution to be an official language of Mari El. By the beginning of the 21st century, Mari language and literature was taught in 226 schools. At the History and Philology Department of the Mari State University and the Krupskaya Teachers' Training Institute (Yoshkar-Ola), more than half of the subjects are taught in Mari. However, by 2024, only 9% of ethnic Mari children were being taught Mari in just 81 schools.

== Dialects ==
The four main dialects of Mari: Hill Mari Northwestern Mari Meadow Mari Eastern Mari

The principal division between Mari varieties is the West and the East. According to the Soviet linguist Kovedyaeva (1976:9-15, 1993:163-164) the Mari macrolanguage is divided into four main dialects:

- Hill Mari, spoken mainly on the right upper bank of the Volga River around Kozmodemyansk (hence the name), but also on the left bank and in the mouth of Vetluga.
- Northwestern Mari
- Meadow Mari, spoken on the left Volgan bank on the central and eastern plain ("meadow") of Mari El around the republican capital, Yoshkar-Ola.
- Eastern Mari is scattered to the east of Mari El from Vyatka through Kama to Ufa.

Each main dialect is divided into their own smaller local subdialects. Only Hill and Meadow Mari have their own literary written standard varieties, based on the dialects of Kozmodemyansk and Yoshkar-Ola respectively.

Eastern and Meadow Mari are often united as a Meadow–Eastern supra-dialect. Northwestern Mari is transitional between the Hill and Meadow dialects, and its phonology and morphology are closer to Hill Mari.

== Phonology ==
=== Vowels ===
	Front		Central	Back	
	unrounded	rounded	Central	unrounded	rounded
Close	/i/ и/i	/y/ ӱ/ü			/u/ у/u
Mid	/e/ е/e	/ø/ ӧ/ö	/ə/, /ə̟/^{1} ы/y, ӹ/ÿ		/o/ о/o
Open	/æ/^{1} ӓ/ä			/ɑ/ а/a	

1. Only in Hill Mari

The schwa /ə/ and its fronted counterpart are usually transcribed in Finno-Ugric transcription as ə̑ (reduced mid unrounded vowel) and ə (reduced front unrounded vowel) respectively. The former has sometimes been transcribed in IPA as /ɤ/, but phonetically the vowel is most strongly distinguished by its short duration and reduced quality. Descriptions vary on the degree of backness and labialisation.

The mid vowels /e/, /ø/, /o/ have more reduced allophones [e̽], [ø̽], [o̽] at the end of a word.

==== Word prosody ====
Stress is not phonemic in Mari, but a dynamic stress system is exhibited phonetically, the stressed syllable being higher in pitch and amplitude and greater in length than an unstressed syllable. Generally, there is one prominent syllable per word and prominence may be found in any syllable of the word. Post- and prefixes behave as clitics, i.e., they do not have their own stress. For example, пӧ́рт (pört, "house") гыч (gəč, "out of") ([ˈpørt ɣɤt͡ʃ]); or му́ро (muro, "song") дене (dene, "with") ([ˈmuro ðene]).

=== Consonants ===
Consonants are shown in Cyrillic, Latin, and the IPA:

		Labial	Dental	Alveolar		Post- alveolar	Palatal	Velar
		Labial	Dental	plain	pal.	Post- alveolar	Palatal	Velar
Nasal		/m/ м/m		/n/ н/n			/ɲ/ н(ь)/n(')^{2}	/ŋ/ ҥ^{3}/ŋ
Plosive	voiceless	/p/ п/p		/t/ т/t	/tʲ/^{1} т(ь)/t'[ť]^{2}			/k/ к/k
Plosive	voiced	/b/ б/b		/d/ д/d				/ɡ/ г/g
Affricate				/ts/^{1} ц/c		/tʃ/ ч/č		
Fricative	voiceless	/f/^{1} ф/f		/s/ с/s		/ʃ/ ш/š		/x/^{1} х/h
Fricative	voiced	(β)^{4} в/v	(ð)^{4} д/d	/z/ з/z		/ʒ/ ж/ž		(ɣ)^{4} г/g
Rhotic				/r/ (or /ɾ/) р/r				
Approximant	central						/j/ й/j	
Approximant	lateral			/l/ л/l			/ʎ/ л(ь)/l(ľ)^{2}	

1. Only in Russian loanwords, in Hill Mari also onomatopoeia and Chuvashian loanwords.
2. Palatalisation is marked in different ways. A ⟨у⟩ following a palatalised consonant is written as ⟨ю⟩, and ⟨а⟩ following a palatalised consonant is written as ⟨я⟩. If the vowel following a palatalised consonant is an е or an и, palatalisation is not marked at all. In other cases, the soft sign ь is used to mark palatalisation.
3. The modified Cyrillic letter for the velar nasal (ŋ) combines the Cyrillic letter ⟨Н н⟩ with and ⟨Г г⟩, where the rightmost post of Н is conflated with the vertical post of ⟨Г⟩: ⟨Ҥ, ҥ⟩. Although Hill Mari has this sound too, this character is only used in Meadow Mari.
4. In Russian loanwords and after nasals, /b d ɡ/ are voiced stops. Word-finally and before a consonant, there is free variation between voiced fricatives ([β ð ɣ]) and voiceless stops [p t k].

=== Phonological processes ===
Like several other Uralic languages, Mari has vowel harmony. In addition to front/back harmony, Mari also features round/unround harmony. If the stressed vowel in the word is rounded, then the suffix will contain a rounded vowel: for example, кӱтӱ́ ([kyˈty] 'herd') becomes кӱтӱ́штӧ ([kyˈtyʃtø], 'in the herd'); if the stressed vowel is unrounded, then the suffix will contain an unrounded vowel: ки́д ([kid], 'hand') becomes ки́дыште ([ˈkidəʃte], 'in the hand'). If the stressed vowel is back, then the suffix will end in a back vowel: агу́р ([aˈgur], 'whirlpool') becomes агу́рышто ([aˈgurəʃto], 'in the whirlpool').

== Orthography ==
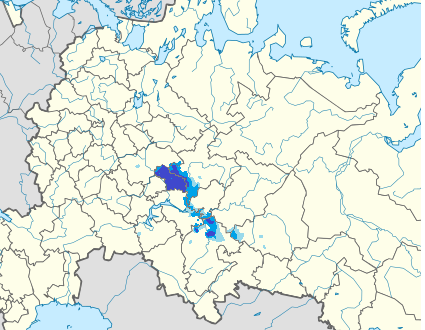
Geographical distribution of the Mari language

Mari is mostly written with the Cyrillic script.

== Declension ==
Like other Uralic languages, Mari is an agglutinative language, adhering to agglutinative typology more than other Uralic languages. It lacks grammatical gender, and does not use articles.

=== Case ===
Meadow Mari has 9 productive cases, of which 3 are locative cases. The usage of the latter ones is restricted to inanimate objects. These cases are all complemented by postpositions, which are either going through or have gone through morphologisation. There are no noun classes, and all inflected forms can be derived from the nominative singular.

Many cases, aside from their basic function, are used in other situations, such as in expressions of time.

- Nominative, used for subjects, predicatives and for other grammatical functions.
- Genitive, is used for possessive constructions.
- Dative, the indirect object's case.
- Accusative, the direct object's case.
- Comitative, used when a subject or an object can be split up into parts, or in adverbials expressing the involvement of an object in an action.
- Comparative, used to express the likeness to something.
- Inessive, used to state where something is.
- Illative, used to state where something is going.
- Lative, used to express into what something is going.

Case Name	Suffix	Question Words	Example (animate)	Example (inanimate)
Nominative	-	кӧ, мо (who, what)	йоча (a child; subject)	ял (a village; subject)
Genitive	-(ы)н	кӧн, мон (whose, what's)	йочан (of a child)	ялын (of a village)
Dative	-лан	кӧлан, молан (to whom, to what/why)	йочалан (to a child)	яллан (to a village)
Accusative	-(ы)м	кӧм, мом (whom, what)	йочам (a child; object)	ялым (a village; object)
Comitative	-ге	кӧге, моге (with whom, with what)	йочаге (with a child)	ялге (with a village)
Comparative	-ла	кӧла, мола (like who, like what)	йочала (like a child)	ялла (like a village)
Inessive	-(ы)ште/(ы)што/(ы)штӧ	кушто (where)	-	ялыште (in a village)
Illative	-(ы)шке/(ы)шко/(ы)шкӧ, -(ы)ш (Note: The illative has a short form, equivalent to the long form in meaning.)	кушко/куш (where to)	-	ялышке/ялыш (to a village)
Lative	-ш/еш/эш	кушан (where to)	-	ялеш (into a village)

If a locative statement was to be made about an animate object, postpositions would be used.

Additionally, terms denoting family members have vocative forms. These are, however, not created with a specific paradigm, and only exist in a few pre-defined cases.

Hill Mari has these cases, plus the abessive case (of the form -де), which is used to form adverbials stating without the involvement or influence of which an action happens.

=== Number ===
Mari has three morphemes to signify plurality. Plurality is not always marked and may be inferred from semantics.

- -влак (-vlak) – Standard plural form.
- -шамыч (-šamõč) – Alternative standard plural, used in many dialects. There is no difference in meaning between these two.
- -мыт (mət) – Sociative plural. Used to signify a group of people: the members of a family, a person and their family and friends.

=== Possessive suffixes ===
Every grammatical person in Mari has its own possessive suffix.

Person	Suffix	Example
-	-	шӱргӧ (face)
First-person singular	-ем/эм	шӱргем (my face)
Second-person singular	-ет/эт	шӱргет (your face)
Third-person singular	-же/жо/жӧ/ше/шо/шӧ	шӱргыжӧ (his/her/its face)
First-person plural	-на	шӱргына (our face)
Second-person plural	-да	шӱргыда (your face)
Third-person plural	-шт/ышт	шӱргышт (their face)

=== Additional suffixes ===
Additional particles, falling into none of the categories above, can be added to the very end of a word, giving it some additional meaning. For example, the suffix -ат (-at), means 'also' or 'too'.

=== Arrangement of suffixes ===
The arrangement of suffixes varies from case to case. Although the case suffixes are after the possessive suffixes in the genitive and the accusative, the opposite is the case for the locative cases. In the dative, both arrangements are possible.

Case	Singular	Example	Plural
Nominative	P	пӧртем – 'my house (subject)'	пӧртем-влак – 'my houses (subject)'
Genitive	P → C	пӧртемын – 'of my house'	пӧртем-влакын – 'of my houses'
Accusative	P → C	пӧртемым – 'my house (object)'	пӧртем-влакым – 'my houses (object)'
Comitative	P → C	пӧртемге – 'with my house'	пӧртем-влакге – 'with my houses'
Dative	P → C, C → P	пӧртемлан, пӧртланем – 'to my house'	пӧртем-влаклан – 'to my houses'
Comparative	P → C, C → P	пӧртемла, пӧртлам – 'like my house'	пӧртем-влакла – 'like my houses'
Inessive	C → P	пӧртыштем – 'in my house'	пӧрт-влакыштем – 'in my houses'
Illative	C → P	пӧртышкем – 'into my house'	пӧрт-влакышкем – 'into my houses'
Lative	C → P	пӧртешем – 'into my house'	пӧрт-влакешем – 'into my houses'

There are many other arrangements in the plural—the position of the plural particle is flexible. The arrangement here is one commonly used possibility. Allomorphy is generally transparent, with the realisation of affixes being predictable, with the exception of some cases.

=== Comparison ===
Comparison happens with adjectives and adverbs. The comparative is formed with the suffix -рак (-rak). The superlative is formed by adding the word эн (en) in front.

	Comparative	Superlative
кугу – 'big'	кугурак – 'bigger'	эн кугу – 'biggest'

== Conjugation ==
Morphologically, conjugation follows three tenses and three moods in Meadow Mari.

=== Conjugation types ===
In Meadow Mari, verbs can conjugate according to two conjugation types. These differ from each other in all forms but the infinitive and the third-person plural of the imperative. As the infinitive is the form denoted in dictionaries and word lists, it is thus necessary to either mark verb infinitives by their conjugation type in word lists, or to include a form in which the conjugation class is visible—usually, the first-person singular present, which ends in -ам (or -ям) for verbs in the first category, and in -ем (or -эм) for second-type verbs.

Literary Meadow Mari has only two irregular verbs, the 'negative verb' and the word for 'to be'.

Like nouns, nonfinite verb forms can also take person suffixes, reflecting the subject or possessor.

=== Tense ===
The three tenses of Mari verbs are:

1. Present: The present tense is used for present and future actions, for states of being and for habitual actions, among others.
2. First preterite: The first preterite is used to express observed, recent actions.
3. Second preterite: The second preterite is used for actions that are in the more-distant past.

Additional tenses can be formed through periphrasis.

- First periphrastic imperfect
- Second periphrastic imperfect
- First periphrastic perfect
- Second periphrastic perfect

=== Mood ===
The moods are:

1. Indicative: The indicative is used to express facts and positive beliefs. All intentions that a particular language does not categorise as another mood are classified as indicative. It can be formed in all persons, in all times.
2. Imperative: The imperative expresses direct commands, requests, and prohibitions. It only exists in the present tense, and exists in all persons but the first person singular.
3. Desiderative: The desiderative is used to express desires. It can be formed for all persons, in the present tense and in the two periphrastic imperfect.

=== Negation ===
Negation in Mari uses a 'negative verb', much like Finnish does. The negative verb is more versatile than the negative verb in Finnish (see Finnish grammar), existing in more grammatical tenses and moods. It has its own form in the present indicative, imperative and desiderative, and in the first preterite indicative. Other negations are periphrastic.

The negation verb in its corresponding form is put in front of the negated verb in its second-person singular (the stem-only form), much as it is in Finnish and Estonian.

Person	Indicative present	Imperative present	Desiderative present	Indicative first preterite
First-person singular	ом (om)	-	ынем (ənem)	шым (šəm)
Second-person singular	от (ot)	ит (it)	ынет (ənet)	шыч (šəč)
Third-person singular	огеш (ogeš) / ок (ok)	ынже (ənže)	ынеж(е) (ənež(e))	ыш (əš)
First-person plural	огына (ogəna) / она (ona)	-	ынена (ənena)	ышна (əšna)
Second-person plural	огыда (ogəda) / ода (oda)	ида (ida)	ынеда (əneda)	ышда (əšda)
Third-person plural	огыт (ogət)	ынышт (ənəšt)	ынешт (ənešt)	ышт (əšt)

The verb улаш (ulaš) – to be – has its own negated forms.

Person	
First-person singular – 'I am not'	омыл (oməl)
Second-person singular – 'You are not'	отыл (otəl)
Third-person singular – 'He/she/it is not'	огыл (ogəl)
First-person plural – 'We are not'	огынал (ogənal) / онал (onal)
Second-person plural – 'You are not'	огыдал (ogədal) / одал (odal)
Third-person plural – 'They are not'	огытыл (ogətəl)

=== Example ===
In order to illustrate the conjugation in the respective moods and times, one verb of the first declination (лекташ – to go) and one verb of the second declination (мондаш – to forget) will be used.

Conjugation of the present indicative positive
Person	1st dec. pos.	2nd dec. pos.
1st singular	лектам (I go)	мондем (I forget)
2nd singular	лектат (You go)	мондет (You forget)
3rd singular	лектеш (He/she/it goes)	монда (He/she/it forgets)
1st plural	лектына (We go)	мондена (We forget)
2nd plural	лектыда (You go)	мондеда (You forget)
3rd plural	лектыт (They go)	мондат (They forget)

Conjugation of the present indicative negative
Person	1st dec. neg.	2nd dec. neg.
1st singular	ом лек^{2} (I don't go)	ом мондо^{1} (I don't forget)
2nd singular	от лек^{2} (You don't go)	от мондо^{1} (You don't forget)
3rd singular	огеш лек^{2} (He/she/it doesn't go)	огеш мондо^{1} (He/she/it doesn't forget)
1st plural	огына лек^{2} (We don't go)	огына мондо^{1} (We don't forget)
2nd plural	огыда лек^{2} (You don't go)	огыда мондо^{1} (You don't forget)
3rd plural	огыт лек^{2} (They don't go)	огыт мондо^{1} (They don't forget)

1. Bold letters are subject to vowel harmony—they can be е/о/ӧ, depending on the preceding full vowel.
2. First-conjugation verb forms using the imperative second-person singular as their stem are subject to the same stem changes as the imperative – see imperative second-person singular.

Conjugation of the 1st preterite indicative positive
Person	1st dec. pos.	2nd dec. pos.
1st singular	лектым^{3} (I went)	мондышым (I forgot)
2nd singular	лектыч^{3} (You went)	мондышыч (You forgot)
3rd singular	лекте^{1, 3} (He/she/it went)	мондыш (He/she/it forgot)
1st plural	лекна^{2} (We went)	мондышна (We forget)
2nd plural	лекда^{2} (You went)	мондышда (You forgot)
3rd plural	лектыч^{3} (They went)	мондышт (They forgot)

1. Bold letters are subject to vowel harmony—they can be е/о/ӧ, depending on the preceding full vowel.
2. First-conjugation verb forms using the imperative second-person singular as their stem are subject to the same stem changes as the imperative – see imperative second-person singular.
3. If the consonant prior to the ending can be palatalised—if it is л (l) or н (n)—it is palatalised in this position. Palatalisation is not marked if the vowel following a consonant is an е.
  колаш → кольым, кольыч, кольо, колна, колда, кольыч (to hear)

Conjugation of the 1st preterite indicative negative
Person	1st dec. neg.	2nd dec. neg.
1st singular	шым лек^{2} (I didn't go)	шым мондо^{1} (I didn't forget)
2nd singular	шыч лек^{2} (You didn't go)	шыч мондо^{1} (You didn't forget)
3rd singular	ыш лек^{2} (He/she/it didn't go)	ыш мондо^{1} (He/she/it didn't forget)
1st plural	ышна лек^{2} (We didn't go)	ышна мондо^{1} (We don't forget)
2nd plural	ышда лек^{2} (You didn't go)	ышда мондо^{1} (You didn't forget)
3rd plural	ышт лек^{2} (They didn't go)	ышт мондо^{1} (They didn't forget)

1. Bold letters are subject to vowel harmony—they can be е/о/ӧ, depending on the preceding full vowel.
2. First-conjugation verb forms using the imperative second-person singular as their stem are subject to the same stem changes as the imperative – see imperative second-person singular.

Conjugation of the 2nd preterite indicative positive
Person	1st dec. pos.	2nd dec. pos.
1st singular	лектынам (I went)	монденам (I forgot)
2nd singular	лектынат (You went)	монденат (You forgot)
3rd singular	лектын (He/she/it went)	монден (He/she/it forgot)
1st plural	лектынна (We went)	монденна (We forget)
2nd plural	лектында (You went)	монденда (You forgot)
3rd plural	лектыныт (They went)	монденыт (They forgot)

Conjugation of the 2nd preterite indicative negative
Person	1st dec. neg.	2nd dec. neg.
1st singular	лектын омыл (I didn't go)	монден омыл (I didn't forget)
2nd singular	лектын отыл (You didn't go)	монден отыл (You didn't forget)
3rd singular	лектын огыл (He/she/it didn't go)	монден огыл (He/she/it didn't forget)
1st plural	лектын огынал (We didn't go)	монден огынал (We don't forget)
2nd plural	лектын огыдал (You didn't go)	монден огыдал (You didn't forget)
3rd plural	лектын огытыл (They didn't go)	монден огытыл (They didn't forget)

Conjugation of the imperative positive
Person	1st dec. pos.	2nd dec. pos.
1st singular	–	–
2nd singular	лек^{3} (Go!)	мондо^{1} (Forget!)
3rd singular	лекше^{2} (He/She/It should go)	мондыжо^{1} (He/She/It should forget)
1st plural	лектына (Let's go)	мондена (Let's forget)
2nd plural	лекса^{2} (Go!)	мондыза (Forget!)
3rd plural	лекытшт (They should go)	мондышт (They should forget)

1. Bold letters are subject to vowel harmony—they can be е/о/ӧ, depending on the preceding full vowel.
2. First-conjugation verb forms using the imperative second-person singular as their stem are subject to the same stem changes as the imperative.
3. In the first conjugation, the imperative second-person singular is formed by removing the -аш ending from the infinitive. Four consonant combinations are not allowed at the end of an imperative, and are thus simplified—one consonant is lost.
  кт → к, нч → ч, чк → ч, шк → ш

Conjugation of the imperative negative
Person	1st dec. neg.	2nd dec. neg.
1st singular	-	-
2nd singular	ит лек^{2} (Don't go!)	ит мондо^{1} (Don't forget!)
3rd singular	ынже лек^{2} (He/She/It shouldn't go)	ынже мондо^{1} (He/She/It shouldn't forget)
1st plural	огына лек^{2} (Let's not go)	огына мондо^{1} (Let's not forget)
2nd plural	ида лек^{2} (Don't go!)	ида мондо^{1} (Don't forget!)
3rd plural	ынышт лек^{2} (They shouldn't go)	ынышт мондо^{1} (They shouldn't forget)

1. Bold letters are subject to vowel harmony—they can be е/о/ӧ, depending on the preceding full vowel.
2. First-conjugation verb forms using the imperative second-person singular as their stem are subject to the same stem changes as the imperative – see imperative second-person singular.

Conjugation of the present desiderative positive
Person	1st dec. pos.	2nd dec. pos.
1st singular	лекнем^{2} (I want to go)	мондынем (I want to forget)
2nd singular	лекнет^{2} (You want to go)	мондынет (You want to forget)
3rd singular	лекнеже^{2} (He/she/it wants to go)	мондынеже (He/she/it wants to forget)
1st plural	лекнена^{2} (We want to go)	мондынена (We want to forget)
2nd plural	лекнеда^{2} (You want to go)	мондынеда (You want to forget)
3rd plural	лекнешт^{2} (They want to go)	мондынешт (They want to forget)

1. First-conjugation verb forms using the imperative second-person singular as their stem are subject to the same stem changes as the imperative – see imperative second-person singular.

Conjugation of the present desiderative negative
Person	1st dec. neg.	2nd dec. neg.
1st singular	ынем лек^{2} (I don't want to go)	ынем мондо^{1} (I don't want to forget)
2nd singular	ынет лек^{2} (You don't want to go)	ынет мондо^{1} (You don't want to forget)
3rd singular	ынеже лек^{2} (He/she/it doesn't want to go)	ынеже мондо^{1} (He/she/it doesn't want to forget)
1st plural	ынена лек^{2} (We don't want to go)	ынена мондо^{1} (We don't want to forget)
2nd plural	ынеда лек^{2} (You don't want to go)	ынеда мондо^{1} (You don't want to forget)
3rd plural	ынешт лек^{2} (They don't want to go)	ынешт мондо^{1} (They don't want to forget)

1. Bold letters are subject to vowel harmony—they can be е/о/ӧ, depending on the preceding full vowel.
2. First-conjugation verb forms using the imperative second-person singular as their stem are subject to the same stem changes as the imperative – see imperative second-person singular.

Conjugation of улаш – to be – in the indicative mood
Person	Present		1st preterite		2nd preterite	
Person	positive	negative	positive	negative	positive	negative
1st sing.	улам (I am)	омыл (I am not)	ыльым (I was)	шым лий (I was not)	улынам (I was)	лийын омыл (I was not)
2nd sing.	улат (You are)	отыл (You are not)	ыльыч (You were)	шыч лий (You were not)	улынат (You were)	лийын отыл (You were not)
3rd sing.	уло (улеш) (He/she/it is)	огыл (He/she/it is not)	ыле (He/she/it was)	ыш лий (He/she/it was not)	улмаш(ын) (He/she/it was)	лийын огыл (He/she/it was not)
1st pl.	улына (We are)	огынал (We are not)	ыльна (We were)	ышна лий (We were not)	улынна (We were)	лийын огынал (We were not)
2nd pl.	улыда (You are)	огыдал (You are not)	ыльда (You were)	ышда лий (You were not)	улында (You were)	лийын огыдал (You were not)
3rd pl.	улыт (They are)	огытыл (They are not)	ыльыч (They were)	ышт лий (They were not)	улыныт (They were)	лийын огытыл (They were not)

=== Infinitive forms ===
Verbs have two infinitive forms: the standard infinitive and the necessive infinitive, used when a person must do something. The person needing to do something is put in the dative in such a situation.

=== Participles ===
There are four participles in Meadow Mari:

- Active participle
- Passive participle
- Negative participle
- Future participle

=== Gerunds ===
There are five gerunds in Meadow Mari:

- Affirmative instructive gerund
- Negative instructive gerund
- Gerund for prior actions I
- Gerund for prior actions II
- Gerund for simultaneous actions

== Syntax ==
=== Word order ===
Word order in Mari is subject–object–verb. This means that the object appears directly before the predicate. Word order in Mari is affected by information structure. However, the position of the verb is not affected. The focus position is directly before the verb. Subjects, objects, adverbial, and secondary predicate can appear in this position. The examples below quoted in Saarinen (2022) show the different elements that can appear in the focus position.

Element in the focus position	
Object	Чачи корно мучко Сакарым шонен кайыш. t͡ɕɑt͡ɕi korno mut͡ɕko sɑkɑr-əm ʃon-en kɑjə-ʃ Chachi road end.ILL Sakar-ACC think-CVB go-1PST.3SG 'Chachi walked to the end of the road, while thinking of Sakar.'
Subject	Школым мый ыштенам мо? ʃkol-əm məj əʃt-en-ɑm mo school-ACC 1SG make-2PST-1SG Q 'Was it I who built the school?'
Adverbial	Игече келге шыжыш тошкалын. iget͡ɕe kelge ʃəʒə-ʃ toʃkɑl-ən weather deep autumn-ILL step-2PST.3SG 'The weather changed to that of a true autumn.'
Secondary predicate	Мам нулевой мычаш маныт? mɑ-m nuleβoj mət͡ʃɑʃ mɑn-ət what-ACC zero ending say-3PL 'Which (elements) are called zero endings?'

Question particles мо /mo/ and ма /mɑ/ are clause-final.

However, Georgieva et al. (2021) point out that Mari also allows backgrounded material to occur after the verb.

Example taken from Georgieva et al. (2021) showing that backgrounded material can occur after the verb

məj kert-am kušt-en
1SG can-1SG dance-GER
'I can dance (e.g. as opposed to you).

Moving the verb to other positions in the sentence is possible for stylistic reasons or for emphasis.

=== Nominal predication ===
Two nouns can be put against each other to form nominal predication. According to Saarinen (2022) both nouns and adjectives appear in the nominative case and do not agree with the subject in number in nominal predication. Saarinen (2022) notes that when the sentence is in the indicative mood with 3sg, a copula is not used. However, a copula is obligatory and appears clause-final and in other persons, tenses, and moods.

=== Verbal predication ===
Saarinen (2022) points out that the object is marked with the accusative in transitive clauses. However, the object can appear in the nominative case in non-finite constructions. When the clause is ditransitive, the direct object appears in the accusative case and the indirect takes the dative case. However, Saarinen (2022) notes that in dialects and with verbs such as йӱкты- /jyktə-/ 'water' and пукшы- /pukʃə-/ 'feed' both objects appear in the accusative case.

== Vocabulary ==
Note that the accent mark, which denotes the place of stress, is not used in actual Mari orthography.

Mari word/expression	Transliteration	Meaning
По́ро ке́че	Póro kéče	Good day
Ку́гу та́у	Kúgu táu	Thank you (very much)
ик	ik	one
кок	kok	two
кум	kum	three
ныл	nəl	four
вич	vič	five
куд	kud	six
шым	šəm	seven
канда́ш	kandáš	eight
инде́ш	indéš	nine
лу	lu	ten
мут	mut	word

== Bibliography ==
- Alhoniemi, Alho (2010) [1985]. Marin kielioppi [Mari Grammar] (PDF) (in Finnish) (2nd ed.). Helsinki: Suomalais-Ugrilainen Seura. (Hill and Meadow)
- Alhoniemi, A. (1986). Marin kielen lukemisto sanastoineen. Helsinki. (Hill and Meadow)
- Beke, О. (1911). Cseremisz nyelvtan. Budapest. (Hill and Meadow)
- Budenz, J. (1866). Erdéi és hegyi cseremisz szótár. Pest. (Mari [Hill and Meadow], Hungarian, Latin)
- Castrén, M. A. (1845). Elementa grammaticae tscheremissicae. Kuopio. (Hill)
- Glukhov, N. and V. Glukhov, "Mari Men and Women as Bearers of the Mari Language and Identity", Wiener elektronische Beiträge des Instituts für Finno-Ugristik, 2003. Available, along with other papers on Finno-Ugric languages and cultures
- Ingemann, F. J. and T. A. Sebeok, An Eastern Cheremis Manual: Phonology, Grammar, Texts and Glossary (= American Council of Learned Societies, Research and Studies in Uralic and Altaic languages, project nos. 6 and 31), Bloomington, 1961 (Meadow);
- Klima, L. "The linguistic affinity of the Volgaic Finno-Ugrians and their ethnogenesis", 2004
- Kangasmaa-Minn, Eeva. 1998. Mari. In Daniel Abondolo (ed.), The Uralic Languages, 219-248. London: Routledge.
- Lewy E., Tscheremissische Grammatik, Leipzig, 1922 (Meadow);
- Ramstedt G. J., Bergtscheremissische Sprachstudien, Helsinki, 1902 (Hill);
- Räsänen M., Die tschuwassischen Lehnwörter im Tscheremissischen, Helsinki, 1920;
- Räsänen M., Die tatarischen Lehnwörter im Tscheremissischen, Helsinki, 1923.
- Sebeok, T. A. and A. Raun. (eds.), The First Cheremis Grammar (1775): A Facsimile Edition, Chicago, 1956.
- Szilasi M., Cseremisz szótár, Budapest, 1901 (Mari [Hill and Meadow], Hungarian, German);
- Wichmann Y., Tscheremissische Texte mit Wörterverzeichnis und grammatikalischem Abriss, Helsingfors, 1923 (Hill and Meadow);
- Wiedemann F., Versuch einer Grammatik der tscheremissischen Sprache, Saint Petersburg, 1847 (Hill);
- Васильев В. М., Записки по грамматике народа мари, Kazan', 1918 (Hill and Meadow);
- Васильев В. М., Марий Мутэр, Moscow, 1929 (Hill and Meadow);
- Галкин, И. С., Историческая грамматика марийского языка, vol. I, II, Yoshkar-Ola, 1964, 1966;
- Галкин, И. С., "Происхождение и развитие марийского языка", Марийцы. Историко-этнографические очерки/Марий калык. Историй сынан этнографий очерк-влак, Yoshkar-Ola, 2005: 43-46.
- Зорина, З. Г., Г. С. Крылова, and Э. С. Якимова. Марийский язык для всех, ч. 1. Йошкар-Ола: Марийское книжное издательство, * Кармазин Г. Г., Материалы к изучению марийского языка, Krasnokokshajsk, 1925 (Meadow);
- Иванов И. Г., История марийского литературного языка, Yoshkar-Ola, 1975;
- Иванов И. Г., Марий диалектологий, Yoshkar-Ola, 1981;
- Кармазин Г. Г., Учебник марийского языка лугово-восточного наречия, Yoshkar-Ola, 1929 (Meadow);
- Коведяева Е. И. "Марийский язык", Основы финно-угорского языкознания. Т.3. Moscow, 1976: 3-96.
- Коведяева Е. И. "Марийский язык", Языки мира: Уральские языки. Moscow, 1993: 148-164.
- Коведяева Е. И. "Горномарийский вариант литературного марийского языка", Языки мира: Уральские языки. Moscow, 1993: 164-173.
- Шорин В. С., Маро-русский словарь горного наречия, Kazan', 1920 (Hill);
- Троицкий В. П., Черемисско-русский словарь, Kazan', 1894 (Hill and Meadow);
