= Hill Mari language =

Uralic language of the Mari El Republic, Russia

Hill Mari
- Western Mari
- кырык мары kyryk mary
- Native to: Russia
- Region: Mari El (Gornomariysky, Yurinsky, Kilemarsky districts), Nizhny Novgorod Oblast
- Ethnicity: Hill Mari people
- Native speakers: 30,000 (2012)
- Language family: Uralic: Mari; Western Mari; Hill Mari

Official status
- Official language in: Russia: Mari El

Language codes
- ISO 639-3: mrj
- Glottolog: kozy1238
- ELP: Western Mari
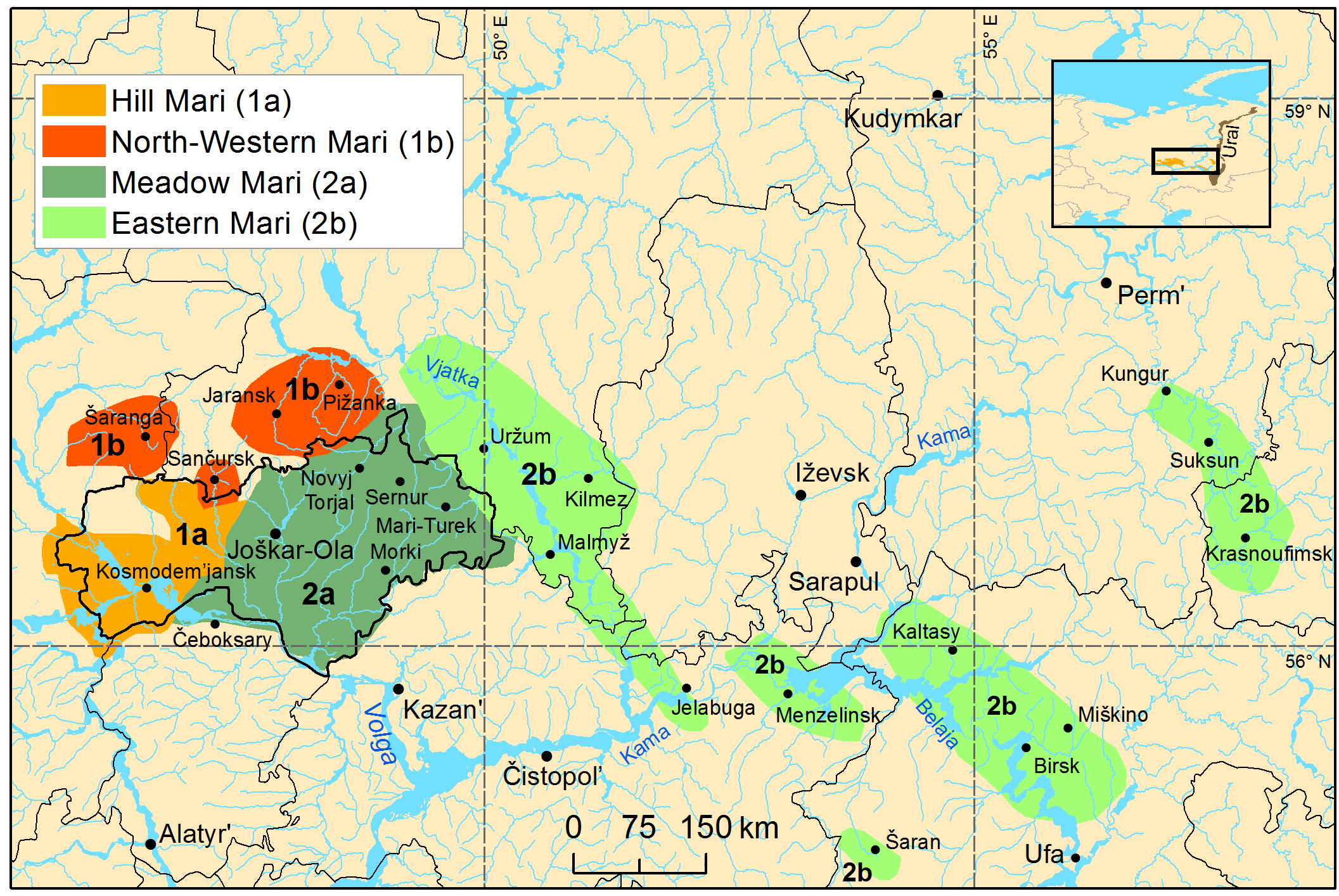
- Hill Mari

- Western Mari is classified as Severely Endangered by the UNESCO Atlas of the World's Languages in Danger

Hill Mari, or Western Mari (кырык мары, kyryk mary), is a Uralic language closely related to Northwestern Mari and Meadow Mari, in which Hill Mari forms a Western Mari group with the former.

Hill Mari is spoken in the Gornomariysky, Yurinsky and Kilemarsky districts of Mari El, as well as in Voskresensky District of Nizhny Novgorod Oblast, Russia. In the northern part of its distribution area, it borders the Northwestern Mari language, with which it together occupies the western regions of Mari language distribution. The main differences between Hill Mari and Meadow Mari are phonological, and to a lesser extent, morphological.

It is written using the Hill Mari Cyrillic script and is co-official with Russian as well as Meadow Mari in the Mari El Republic. Media in Hill Mari includes the newspapers Zhera and Yamdy li!, the literary journal U sem, and broadcasts on Gornomariysky Radio.

== Number of speakers ==
According to the 2002 Russian Census, 36,822 people reported knowledge of Hill Mari. The 2010 Russian Census recorded 23,062 speakers.

Distribution of Hill Mari speakers by region (2002 Census)
| Federal district/Region | Number of speakers (% of total) |
|---|---|
| Volga Federal District, including: | 26,012 (70.6%) |
| Mari El | 18,056 (49%) |
| Bashkortostan | 3,381 (9.2%) |
| Tatarstan | 1,226 (3.3%) |
| Nizhny Novgorod Oblast | 1,341 (3.6%) |
| Ural Federal District, including: | 5,970 (16.2%) |
| Sverdlovsk Oblast | 4,949 (13.4%) |
| Central Federal District | 1,354 (3.7%) |
| Siberian Federal District | 1,273 (3.5%) |
| Southern Federal District (incl. North Caucasus) | 1,176 (3.2%) |
| Northwestern Federal District | 558 (1.5%) |
| Far Eastern Federal District | 479 (1.3%) |
| Total | 36,822 (100%) |

== Dialects ==
Hill Mari comprises two main dialect groups:

=== Mountain dialect ===
Spoken on the right bank of the Volga River, this dialect forms the basis of the literary language. It includes the following subdialects:

- Yelasovsky — basis of the literary standard
- Kuznetsovsky
- Yemangashsky
- Vilovatovsky

=== Forest dialect ===
Spoken on the left bank of the Volga, it includes:

- Kuzminsky
- Kilemarsky
- Ardinsky
- Yuksarsky

== Phonology ==
Hill Mari is characterized by vowel harmony (syngharmonism), which is particularly well developed in the mountain dialect. Both vowels and consonants are subject to this harmony. If a syllable contains the back vowels a, o, u, or y (ы̆), then subsequent syllables may contain only these vowels (in addition to e and i). Conversely, if a syllable contains the front vowels ä, ö, ü, or ӹ, then subsequent syllables may contain only these front vowels (plus e and i). In syllables with front vowels (ä, ö, ü, ӹ, e, i), consonants (except l' and n, which are always palatalized) are pronounced as semi-palatalized.

== Writing system ==
The literary Hill Mari language uses a writing system based on the Russian Cyrillic "civil" alphabet. The orthographic principle is primarily phonetic.

=== Alphabet ===
| А а | Ӓ ӓ | Б б | В в | Г г | Д д | Е е | Ё ё |
| Ж ж | З з | И и | Й й | К к | Л л | М м | Н н |
| О о | Ӧ ӧ | П п | Р р | С с | Т т | У у | Ӱ ӱ |
| Ф ф | Х х | Ц ц | Ч ч | Ш ш | Щ щ | Ъ ъ | Ы ы |
| Ӹ ӹ | Ь ь | Э э | Ю ю | Я я |

== History of research ==
The first studies of Mari languages appeared in the early 18th century. The first grammar specifically of Hill Mari, titled Cheremiskaya grammatika (Cheremis Grammar), was published in Kazan in 1837. Subsequently, the study of Mari languages and dialects was conducted by Russian, Finnish, and Hungarian scholars. Today, there are two fully developed literary Mari languages: Hill Mari and Meadow Mari.

== See also ==
- Hill Mari people
- Valeri Alikov
- Mari language
- Meadow Mari language
- Northwestern Mari language

== Bibliography ==
- Albinsky, A. D. Cheremiskaya grammatika [Cheremis Grammar]. Kazan, 1837.
- Kovedyaeva, Ye. I. "Gornomariyskiy variant literaturnogo mariyskogo yazyka" [The Hill Mari Variant of Literary Mari], Yazyki mira: Ural'skiye yazyki [Languages of the World: Uralic Languages]. Moscow, 1993: 164–173.
- Krasnova, Nadezhda; Yefremova, Tatiana; Riese, Timothy; Bradley, Jeremy. Reading Hill Mari through Meadow Mari. Vienna, 2017.
- Saarinen, Sirkka (2022). "Mari". In Bakró-Nagy, Marianne; Laakso, Johanna; Skribnik, Elena (eds.). The Oxford Guide to the Uralic Languages. Oxford University Press. ISBN 978-0-19-876766-4.
- Savatkova, A. A. Slovar' gornogo narechiya mariyskogo yazyka [Dictionary of the Mountain Dialect of the Mari Language]. Yoshkar-Ola, 1981.
- Shorin, V. S. Maro-russkiy slovar' gornogo narechiya [Mari-Russian Dictionary of the Mountain Dialect]. Kazan, 1920.
- Yuadarov, K. G. Gornomariyskiy yazyk [Hill Mari Language]: Textbook for teachers of native language and students. Yoshkar-Ola, 1997.
