= Meadow Mari language =

Uralic language of the Mari El Republic, Russia

Meadow Mari
- Meadow–Eastern Mari; Eastern Mari
- олык марий olyk marij
- Native to: Russia
- Region: Mari El
- Ethnicity: Meadow Mari, Eastern Mari
- Native speakers: 470,000 (2012)
- Language family: Uralic: Mari; Meadow Mari
- Writing system: Cyrillic

Official status
- Official language in: Russia: Mari El

Language codes
- ISO 639-3: mhr
- Glottolog: east2328
- ELP: Eastern Mari
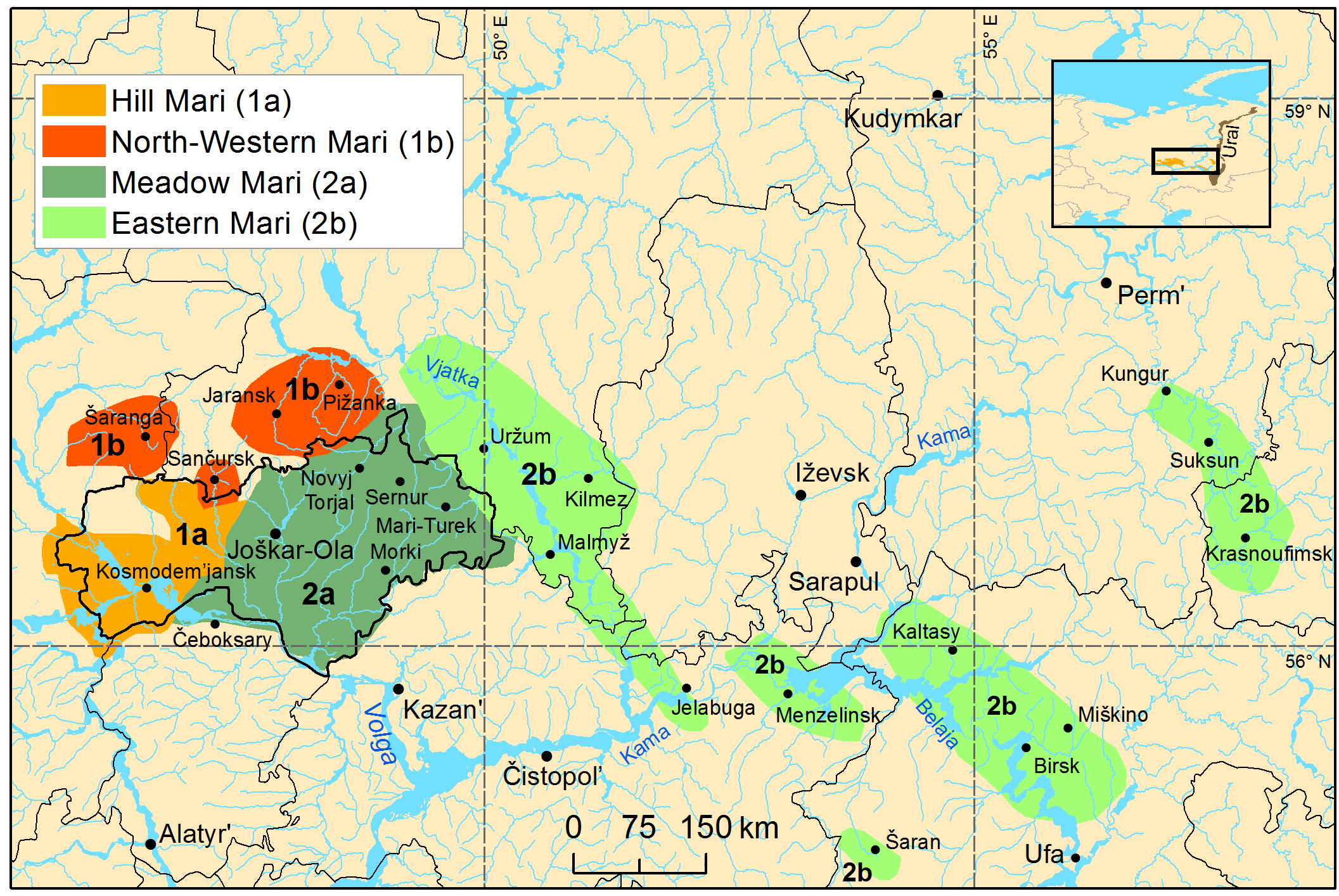
- Meadow Mari

- Eastern Mari is classified as Definitely Endangered by the UNESCO Atlas of the World's Languages in Danger

Meadow Mari (олык марий, olyk marij), also known as Meadow–Eastern Mari, or Eastern Mari, is a standardised dialect of the Mari language used by about half a million people mostly in European Russia. Meadow Mari, Hill Mari, and Russian are official languages in the republic of Mari El in the Russian Federation.

Meadow Mari and Eastern Mari are distinct language varieties, which both use the Meadow Mari literary standard. The main differences between Meadow Mari and Hill Mari are phonological, and to a lesser extent, morphological.

== Alphabet ==
А а	Б б	В в	Г г	Д д	Е е	Ё ё	Ж ж
З з	И и	Й й	К к	Л л	М м	Н н	Ҥ ҥ
О о	Ӧ ӧ	П п	Р р	С с	Т т	У у	Ӱ ӱ
Ф ф	Х х	Ц ц	Ч ч	Ш ш	Щ щ	Ъ ъ	Ы ы
Ь ь	Э э	Ю ю	Я я	У' у'	A.. а..	И.. и..

== Phonology ==
=== Consonants ===
Consonant Phonemes of Meadow Mari
		Bilabial	Labiodental	Alveolar	Postalveolar	Palatal	Velar
Stop	Voiceless	p		t			k
Stop	Voiced	b		d			g
Fricative	Voiceless		(f)				(x)
Fricative	Voiced		v				
Sibilant	Voiceless			s	ʃ		
Sibilant	Voiced			z	ʒ		
Affricate				(t͡s)		t͡ɕ	
Nasal		m		n		ɲ	
Lateral				l		ʎ	
Trill				r			
Approximate						j	

/f, x, ts/ primarily occur in Russian loanwords.

==== Vowels ====
Vowel Phonemes of Meadow Mari
	Front		Central		Back	
	Rounded	Unrounded	Unrounded	Rounded	Unrounded	Rounded
Close	i	y				u
Mid	e	ø	ə			o
Open					ɑ	

Meadow Mari has no diphthongs.

== Grammar ==
Meadow Mari is primarily a suffixing, agglutinating language. It displays vowel harmony between rounded and unrounded vowels. Nouns decline for case, number, and possession.

=== Nouns ===
Nouns can decline for case, number, and possession. The order of the suffixes is not fixed, and can change depending on context.

==== Number ====
Nouns in Meadow Mari have singular and plural forms, with the singular being unmarked. However, the plural form is not used when it is clear from context. There are four potential plural suffixes: -vlak, -šaməč, -la, and -mət. They are partially interchangeable, but not completely. -vlak is the most common suffix. In contrast to the other suffixes, -mət denotes the associative plural.

==== Possession ====
There are three ways to show possession in Meadow Mari: through a dedicated suffix attached to the noun, and a personal pronoun preceding the possessed noun, which may or may not have a possessive suffix.

joča "child"		
Suffix Only	joča-m	"(my) child-poss"
Pronoun and Suffix	məjən joča-m	"1sg.gen child-poss
Pronoun without suffix	məjən joča	"1sg.gen child"

There are 6 possessive suffixes, which agree with person and number.

lüm "name"	
1SG	lüm-em
2SG	lüm-et
3SG	lüm-žö
1PL	lüm-na
2PL	lüm-da
3PL	lüm-əšt

Possessive suffixes are typically only combined with the plural suffixes -vlak and -šaməč. The suffixes can be appended to the noun in any order, however it is most common for the possessive suffix to come first. Example: təlat joltaš-et-vlak jəηgərtenət "your friends called you."
