= Sosnovka =

Sosnovka (Russian: Сосновка) is the name of several inhabited localities in Russia.

== Modern localities ==
=== Altai Krai ===
As of 2012, six rural localities in Altai Krai bear this name:

- Sosnovka, Charyshsky District, Altai Krai, a selo in Mayaksky Selsoviet of Charyshsky District; 51°33′N 83°37′E
- Sosnovka, Krasnogorsky District, Altai Krai, a selo in Ust-Kazhinsky Selsoviet of Krasnogorsky District; 52°35′N 86°33′E
- Sosnovka, Pervomaysky District, Altai Krai, a selo in Bobrovsky Selsoviet of Pervomaysky District; 53°7′N 84°2′E
- Sosnovka, Sovetsky District, Altai Krai, a selo in Shulginsky Selsoviet of Sovetsky District; 52°26′N 85°21′E
- Sosnovka, Tyumentsevsky District, Altai Krai, a settlement in Berezovsky Selsoviet of Tyumentsevsky District; 53°15′N 81°51′E
- Sosnovka, Zarinsky District, Altai Krai, a selo in Sosnovsky Selsoviet of Zarinsky District; 53°53′N 85°23′E

=== Amur Oblast ===
As of 2012, one rural locality in Amur Oblast bears this name:

- Sosnovka, Amur Oblast, a selo in Sosnovsky Rural Settlement of Seryshevsky District

=== Arkhangelsk Oblast ===
As of 2012, three rural localities in Arkhangelsk Oblast bear this name:

- Sosnovka, Konoshsky District, Arkhangelsk Oblast, a settlement in Glubokovsky Selsoviet of Konoshsky District
- Sosnovka, Pinezhsky District, Arkhangelsk Oblast, a settlement in Sosnovsky Selsoviet of Pinezhsky District
- Sosnovka, Plesetsky District, Arkhangelsk Oblast, a settlement in Sosnovsky Selsoviet of Plesetsky District

=== Republic of Bashkortostan ===
As of 2012, ten rural localities in the Republic of Bashkortostan bear this name:

- Sosnovka, Aurgazinsky District, Republic of Bashkortostan, a village in Meselinsky Selsoviet of Aurgazinsky District
- Sosnovka, Bakalinsky District, Republic of Bashkortostan, a village in Bakalinsky Selsoviet of Bakalinsky District
- Sosnovka, Baymaksky District, Republic of Bashkortostan, a village in Zilairsky Selsoviet of Baymaksky District
- Sosnovka, Belokataysky District, Republic of Bashkortostan, a village in Atarshinsky Selsoviet of Belokataysky District
- Sosnovka, Beloretsky District, Republic of Bashkortostan, a selo in Sosnovsky Selsoviet of Beloretsky District
- Sosnovka, Bizhbulyaksky District, Republic of Bashkortostan, a village in Kosh-Yelginsky Selsoviet of Bizhbulyaksky District
- Sosnovka, Kaltasinsky District, Republic of Bashkortostan, a selo in Novokilbakhtinsky Selsoviet of Kaltasinsky District
- Sosnovka, Mechetlinsky District, Republic of Bashkortostan, a village in Alegazovsky Selsoviet of Mechetlinsky District
- Sosnovka, Mishkinsky District, Republic of Bashkortostan, a village in Bolshesukhoyazovsky Selsoviet of Mishkinsky District
- Sosnovka, Zilairsky District, Republic of Bashkortostan, a village in Berdyashsky Selsoviet of Zilairsky District

=== Bryansk Oblast ===
As of 2012, five rural localities in Bryansk Oblast bear this name:

- Sosnovka, Dubrovsky District, Bryansk Oblast, a village in Seshchinsky Rural Administrative Okrug of Dubrovsky District; 53°40′N 33°21′E
- Sosnovka, Dyatkovsky District, Bryansk Oblast, a village in Bolshezhukovsky Rural Administrative Okrug of Dyatkovsky District; 53°33′N 34°22′E
- Sosnovka, Klintsovsky District, Bryansk Oblast, a selo in Korzhovogolubovsky Rural Administrative Okrug of Klintsovsky District; 52°50′N 32°21′E
- Sosnovka, Trubchevsky District, Bryansk Oblast, a village in Seletsky Rural Administrative Okrug of Trubchevsky District; 52°34′N 33°33′E
- Sosnovka, Vygonichsky District, Bryansk Oblast, a selo in Sosnovsky Rural Administrative Okrug of Vygonichsky District; 53°1′N 34°1′E

=== Republic of Buryatia ===
As of 2012, one rural locality in the Republic of Buryatia bears this name:

- Sosnovka, Republic of Buryatia, a selo in Selendumsky Selsoviet of Selenginsky District

=== Chelyabinsk Oblast ===
As of 2012, three rural localities in Chelyabinsk Oblast bear this name:

- Sosnovka, Bredinsky District, Chelyabinsk Oblast, a selo in Rymniksky Selsoviet of Bredinsky District
- Sosnovka, Kunashaksky District, Chelyabinsk Oblast, a village in Burinsky Selsoviet of Kunashaksky District
- Sosnovka, Uvelsky District, Chelyabinsk Oblast, a village in Polovinsky Selsoviet of Uvelsky District
- Sosnovka, Central District of Chelyabinsk, a village

=== Chuvash Republic ===
As of 2012, three inhabited localities in the Chuvash Republic bear this name:

Urban localities

- Sosnovka, Cheboksary, Chuvash Republic, an urban-type settlement under the administrative jurisdiction of the city of republic significance of Cheboksary

Rural localities

- Sosnovka, Ibresinsky District, Chuvash Republic, a village in Shirtanskoye Rural Settlement of Ibresinsky District
- Sosnovka, Morgaushsky District, Chuvash Republic, a village in Alexandrovskoye Rural Settlement of Morgaushsky District

=== Irkutsk Oblast ===
As of 2012, two rural localities in Irkutsk Oblast bear this name:

- Sosnovka, Chunsky District, Irkutsk Oblast, a settlement in Chunsky District
- Sosnovka, Usolsky District, Irkutsk Oblast, a selo in Usolsky District

=== Ivanovo Oblast ===
As of 2012, one rural locality in Ivanovo Oblast bears this name:

- Sosnovka, Ivanovo Oblast, a village in Lezhnevsky District

=== Kaliningrad Oblast ===
As of 2012, seven rural localities in Kaliningrad Oblast bear this name:

- Sosnovka, Bagrationovsky District, Kaliningrad Oblast, a settlement in Pogranichny Rural Okrug of Bagrationovsky District
- Sosnovka, Khrabrovsky Rural Okrug, Guryevsky District, Kaliningrad Oblast, a settlement in Khrabrovsky Rural Okrug of Guryevsky District
- Sosnovka, Lugovskoy Rural Okrug, Guryevsky District, Kaliningrad Oblast, a settlement in Lugovskoy Rural Okrug of Guryevsky District
- Sosnovka, Chistoprudnensky Rural Okrug, Nesterovsky District, Kaliningrad Oblast, a settlement in Chistoprudnensky Rural Okrug of Nesterovsky District
- Sosnovka, Ilyushinsky Rural Okrug, Nesterovsky District, Kaliningrad Oblast, a settlement in Ilyushinsky Rural Okrug of Nesterovsky District
- Sosnovka, Polessky District, Kaliningrad Oblast, a settlement in Saransky Rural Okrug of Polessky District
- Sosnovka, Pravdinsky District, Kaliningrad Oblast, a settlement in Domnovsky Rural Okrug of Pravdinsky District

=== Kaluga Oblast ===
As of 2012, five rural localities in Kaluga Oblast bear this name:

- Sosnovka, Babyninsky District, Kaluga Oblast, a village in Babyninsky District
- Sosnovka, Meshchovsky District, Kaluga Oblast, a village in Meshchovsky District
- Sosnovka, Sukhinichsky District, Kaluga Oblast, a village in Sukhinichsky District
- Sosnovka, Yukhnovsky District, Kaluga Oblast, a village in Yukhnovsky District
- Sosnovka, Zhizdrinsky District, Kaluga Oblast, a village in Zhizdrinsky District

=== Kamchatka Krai ===
As of 2012, one rural locality in Kamchatka Krai bears this name:

- Sosnovka, Kamchatka Krai, a selo in Yelizovsky District

=== Republic of Karelia ===
As of 2012, one rural locality in the Republic of Karelia bears this name:

- Sosnovka, Republic of Karelia, a selo in Medvezhyegorsky District

=== Kemerovo Oblast ===
As of 2012, three rural localities in Kemerovo Oblast bear this name:

- Sosnovka, Guryevsky District, Kemerovo Oblast, a settlement in Sosnovskaya Rural Territory of Guryevsky District; 54°17′N 85°43′E
- Sosnovka, Kemerovsky District, Kemerovo Oblast, a settlement in Arsentyevskaya Rural Territory of Kemerovsky District; 55°45′N 86°6′E
- Sosnovka, Novokuznetsky District, Kemerovo Oblast, a selo in Sosnovskaya Rural Territory of Novokuznetsky District; 53°40′N 87°9′E

=== Khabarovsk Krai ===
As of 2012, one rural locality in Khabarovsk Krai bears this name:

- Sosnovka, Khabarovsk Krai, a selo in Khabarovsky District

=== Khanty-Mansi Autonomous Okrug ===
As of 2012, one rural locality in Khanty-Mansi Autonomous Okrug bears this name:

- Sosnovka, Khanty-Mansi Autonomous Okrug, a settlement in Beloyarsky District

=== Kirov Oblast ===
As of 2012, seven inhabited localities in Kirov Oblast bear this name:

Urban localities

- Sosnovka, Vyatskopolyansky District, Kirov Oblast, a town in Vyatskopolyansky District; 56°15′N 51°18′E

Rural localities

- Sosnovka, Nagorsky District, Kirov Oblast, a village in Nagorsky Rural Okrug of Nagorsky District; 59°7′N 50°41′E
- Sosnovka, Sovetsky District, Kirov Oblast, a village in Zashizhemsky Rural Okrug of Sovetsky District; 57°46′N 48°46′E
- Sosnovka, Svechinsky District, Kirov Oblast, a settlement in Yumsky Rural Okrug of Svechinsky District; 58°28′N 47°37′E
- Sosnovka, Uninsky District, Kirov Oblast, a selo in Sosnovsky Rural Okrug of Uninsky District; 57°47′N 51°42′E
- Sosnovka, Urzhumsky District, Kirov Oblast, a village in Bolsheroysky Rural Okrug of Urzhumsky District; 56°54′N 50°24′E
- Sosnovka, Yaransky District, Kirov Oblast, a village in Znamensky Rural Okrug of Yaransky District; 57°16′N 47°53′E

=== Kostroma Oblast ===
As of 2012, four rural localities in Kostroma Oblast bear this name:

- Sosnovka, Makaryevsky District, Kostroma Oblast, a village in Ust-Neyskoye Settlement of Makaryevsky District; 57°45′N 43°40′E
- Sosnovka, Mezhevskoy District, Kostroma Oblast, a village in Georgiyevskoye Settlement of Mezhevskoy District; 58°32′N 45°4′E
- Sosnovka, Oktyabrsky District, Kostroma Oblast, a village in Pokrovskoye Settlement of Oktyabrsky District; 59°1′N 47°2′E
- Sosnovka, Vokhomsky District, Kostroma Oblast, a village in Belkovskoye Settlement of Vokhomsky District; 58°54′N 46°40′E

=== Krasnoyarsk Krai ===
As of 2012, four rural localities in Krasnoyarsk Krai bear this name:

- Sosnovka, Birilyussky District, Krasnoyarsk Krai, a village in Matalassky Selsoviet of Birilyussky District
- Sosnovka, Mansky District, Krasnoyarsk Krai, a village in Shalinsky Selsoviet of Mansky District
- Sosnovka, Nizhneingashsky District, Krasnoyarsk Krai, a settlement under the administrative jurisdiction of Pokanayevka Work Settlement in Nizhneingashsky District
- Sosnovka, Uzhursky District, Krasnoyarsk Krai, a village in Kulunsky Selsoviet of Uzhursky District

=== Kurgan Oblast ===
As of 2012, three rural localities in Kurgan Oblast bear this name:

- Sosnovka, Kargapolsky District, Kurgan Oblast, a selo in Sosnovsky Selsoviet of Kargapolsky District; 55°44′N 64°41′E
- Sosnovka, Kurtamyshsky District, Kurgan Oblast, a village in Kamyshinsky Selsoviet of Kurtamyshsky District; 55°4′N 65°1′E
- Sosnovka, Vargashinsky District, Kurgan Oblast, a village in Verkhnesuyersky Selsoviet of Vargashinsky District; 55°54′N 66°20′E

=== Kursk Oblast ===
As of 2012, one rural locality in Kursk Oblast bears this name:

- Sosnovka, Kursk Oblast, a selo in Sosnovsky Selsoviet of Gorshechensky District

=== Leningrad Oblast ===
As of 2012, two rural localities in Leningrad Oblast bear this name:

- Sosnovka, Slantsevsky District, Leningrad Oblast, a village under the administrative jurisdiction of Slantsevskoye Settlement Municipal Formation in Slantsevsky District; 59°5′N 28°4′E
- Sosnovka, Tikhvinsky District, Leningrad Oblast, a village in Gankovskoye Settlement Municipal Formation of Tikhvinsky District; 60°6′N 33°55′E

=== Mari El Republic ===
As of 2012, three rural localities in the Mari El Republic bear this name:

- Sosnovka, Gornomariysky District, Mari El Republic, a village in Mikryakovsky Rural Okrug of Gornomariysky District
- Sosnovka, Novotoryalsky District, Mari El Republic, a village in Pektubayevsky Rural Okrug of Novotoryalsky District
- Sosnovka, Zvenigovsky District, Mari El Republic, a village in Krasnoyarsky Rural Okrug of Zvenigovsky District

=== Republic of Mordovia ===
As of 2012, four rural localities in the Republic of Mordovia bear this name:

- Sosnovka, Atyuryevsky District, Republic of Mordovia, a village in Mordovsko-Kozlovsky Selsoviet of Atyuryevsky District
- Sosnovka, Ichalkovsky District, Republic of Mordovia, a settlement in Tarkhanovsky Selsoviet of Ichalkovsky District
- Sosnovka, Temnikovsky District, Republic of Mordovia, a village in Russko-Karayevsky Selsoviet of Temnikovsky District
- Sosnovka, Zubovo-Polyansky District, Republic of Mordovia, a settlement in Sosnovsky Selsoviet of Zubovo-Polyansky District

=== Moscow Oblast ===
As of 2012, two rural localities in Moscow Oblast bear this name:

- Sosnovka, Lyuberetsky District, Moscow Oblast, a village under the administrative jurisdiction of Kraskovo Suburban Settlement in Lyuberetsky District
- Sosnovka, Ozyorsky District, Moscow Oblast, a selo in Klishinskoye Rural Settlement of Ozyorsky District

=== Murmansk Oblast ===
As of 2012, one rural locality in Murmansk Oblast bears this name:

- Sosnovka, Murmansk Oblast, a selo in Lovozersky District

=== Nizhny Novgorod Oblast ===
As of 2012, sixteen rural localities in Nizhny Novgorod Oblast bear this name:

- Sosnovka, Bor, Nizhny Novgorod Oblast, a village in Redkinsky Selsoviet under the administrative jurisdiction of the town of oblast significance of Bor
- Sosnovka, Shakhunya, Nizhny Novgorod Oblast, a village in Luzhaysky Selsoviet under the administrative jurisdiction of the town of oblast significance of Shakhunya
- Sosnovka, Steksovsky Selsoviet, Ardatovsky District, Nizhny Novgorod Oblast, a selo in Steksovsky Selsoviet of Ardatovsky District
- Sosnovka, Ardatov, Ardatovsky District, Nizhny Novgorod Oblast, a selo under the administrative jurisdiction of Ardatov Work Settlement in Ardatovsky District
- Sosnovka, Bolshemurashkinsky District, Nizhny Novgorod Oblast, a village in Grigorovsky Selsoviet of Bolshemurashkinsky District
- Sosnovka, Gorodetsky District, Nizhny Novgorod Oblast, a village in Smirkinsky Selsoviet of Gorodetsky District
- Sosnovka, Solovyevsky Selsoviet, Knyagininsky District, Nizhny Novgorod Oblast, a village in Solovyevsky Selsoviet of Knyagininsky District
- Sosnovka, Vozrozhdensky Selsoviet, Knyagininsky District, Nizhny Novgorod Oblast, a village in Vozrozhdensky Selsoviet of Knyagininsky District
- Sosnovka, Pavlovsky District, Nizhny Novgorod Oblast, a village under the administrative jurisdiction of the town of district significance of Gorbatov in Pavlovsky District
- Sosnovka, Sergachsky District, Nizhny Novgorod Oblast, a selo in Andreyevsky Selsoviet of Sergachsky District
- Sosnovka, Sharangsky District, Nizhny Novgorod Oblast, a settlement in Rozhentsovsky Selsoviet of Sharangsky District
- Sosnovka, Spassky District, Nizhny Novgorod Oblast, a village in Vazyansky Selsoviet of Spassky District
- Sosnovka, Urensky District, Nizhny Novgorod Oblast, a settlement under the administrative jurisdiction of the town of district significance of Uren in Urensky District
- Sosnovka, Vadsky District, Nizhny Novgorod Oblast, a village in Lopatinsky Selsoviet of Vadsky District
- Sosnovka, Vetluzhsky District, Nizhny Novgorod Oblast, a village in Turansky Selsoviet of Vetluzhsky District
- Sosnovka, Voskresensky District, Nizhny Novgorod Oblast, a village in Bogorodsky Selsoviet of Voskresensky District

=== Novgorod Oblast ===
As of 2012, two rural localities in Novgorod Oblast bear this name:

- Sosnovka, Novgorodsky District, Novgorod Oblast, a village in Novoselitskoye Settlement of Novgorodsky District
- Sosnovka, Soletsky District, Novgorod Oblast, a village in Dubrovskoye Settlement of Soletsky District

=== Novosibirsk Oblast ===
As of 2012, two rural localities in Novosibirsk Oblast bear this name:

- Sosnovka, Iskitimsky District, Novosibirsk Oblast, a selo in Iskitimsky District
- Sosnovka, Novosibirsky District, Novosibirsk Oblast, a settlement in Novosibirsky District

=== Omsk Oblast ===
As of 2012, five rural localities in Omsk Oblast bear this name:

- Sosnovka, Azovsky Nemetsky natsionalny District, Omsk Oblast, a selo in Sosnovsky Rural Okrug of Azovsky Nemetsky National District
- Sosnovka, Gorkovsky District, Omsk Oblast, a village in Georgiyevsky Rural Okrug of Gorkovsky District
- Sosnovka, Isilkulsky District, Omsk Oblast, a village in Pervotarovsky Rural Okrug of Isilkulsky District
- Sosnovka, Kormilovsky District, Omsk Oblast, a village in Nekrasovsky Rural Okrug of Kormilovsky District
- Sosnovka, Tavrichesky District, Omsk Oblast, a village in Priirtyshsky Rural Okrug of Tavrichesky District

=== Orenburg Oblast ===
As of 2012, two rural localities in Orenburg Oblast bear this name:

- Sosnovka, Asekeyevsky District, Orenburg Oblast, a settlement in Chkalovsky Selsoviet of Asekeyevsky District
- Sosnovka, Kvarkensky District, Orenburg Oblast, a selo in Urtazymsky Selsoviet of Kvarkensky District

=== Oryol Oblast ===
As of 2012, one rural locality in Oryol Oblast bears this name:

- Sosnovka, Oryol Oblast, a selo in Sosnovsky Selsoviet of Livensky District

=== Penza Oblast ===
As of 2012, eight rural localities in Penza Oblast bear this name:

- Sosnovka, Bashmakovsky District, Penza Oblast, a selo in Sosnovsky Selsoviet of Bashmakovsky District
- Sosnovka, Bekovsky District, Penza Oblast, a selo in Sosnovsky Selsoviet of Bekovsky District
- Sosnovka, Bessonovsky District, Penza Oblast, a selo in Sosnovsky Selsoviet of Bessonovsky District
- Sosnovka, Kuznetsky District, Penza Oblast, a selo in Komarovsky Selsoviet of Kuznetsky District
- Sosnovka, Lopatinsky District, Penza Oblast, a selo in Chardymsky Selsoviet of Lopatinsky District
- Sosnovka, Narovchatsky District, Penza Oblast, a village in Bolshekirdyashevsky Selsoviet of Narovchatsky District
- Sosnovka, Penzensky District, Penza Oblast, a village in Krasnopolsky Selsoviet of Penzensky District
- Sosnovka, Sosnovoborsky District, Penza Oblast, a village in Shugurovsky Selsoviet of Sosnovoborsky District

=== Perm Krai ===
As of 2012, eight rural localities in Perm Krai bear this name:

- Sosnovka, Asovskoye Rural Settlement, Beryozovsky District, Perm Krai, a village in Beryozovsky District
- Sosnovka, Sosnovskoye Rural Settlement, Beryozovsky District, Perm Krai, a selo in Beryozovsky District
- Sosnovka, Karagaysky District, Perm Krai, a village in Karagaysky District
- Sosnovka, Kosinsky District, Perm Krai, a settlement in Kosinsky District
- Sosnovka, Oktyabrsky District, Perm Krai, a village in Oktyabrsky District
- Sosnovka, Ordinsky District, Perm Krai, a selo in Ordinsky District
- Sosnovka, Uinsky District, Perm Krai, a village in Uinsky District
- Sosnovka, Yelovsky District, Perm Krai, a village in Yelovsky District

=== Primorsky Krai ===
As of 2012, one rural locality in Primorsky Krai bears this name:

- Sosnovka, Primorsky Krai, a selo in Spassky District

=== Pskov Oblast ===
As of 2012, four rural localities in Pskov Oblast bear this name:

- Sosnovka, Loknyansky District, Pskov Oblast, a village in Loknyansky District
- Sosnovka, Opochetsky District, Pskov Oblast, a village in Opochetsky District
- Sosnovka, Strugo-Krasnensky District, Pskov Oblast, a village in Strugo-Krasnensky District
- Sosnovka, Velikoluksky District, Pskov Oblast, a village in Velikoluksky District

=== Ryazan Oblast ===
As of 2012, two rural localities in Ryazan Oblast bear this name:

- Sosnovka, Kasimovsky District, Ryazan Oblast, a settlement in Novoderevensky Rural Okrug of Kasimovsky District
- Sosnovka, Korablinsky District, Ryazan Oblast, a village in Kipchakovsky Rural Okrug of Korablinsky District

=== Sakha Republic ===
As of 2012, one rural locality in the Sakha Republic bears this name:

- Sosnovka, Sakha Republic, a selo under the administrative jurisdiction of the Town of Vilyuysk in Vilyuysky District

=== Sakhalin Oblast ===
As of 2012, one rural locality in Sakhalin Oblast bears this name:

- Sosnovka, Sakhalin Oblast, a selo in Dolinsky District

=== Samara Oblast ===
As of 2012, four rural localities in Samara Oblast bear this name:

- Sosnovka, Bezenchuksky District, Samara Oblast, a settlement in Bezenchuksky District
- Sosnovka, Pokhvistnevsky District, Samara Oblast, a selo in Pokhvistnevsky District
- Sosnovka, Stavropolsky District, Samara Oblast, a selo in Stavropolsky District
- Sosnovka, Yelkhovsky District, Samara Oblast, a village in Yelkhovsky District

=== Saratov Oblast ===
As of 2012, five rural localities in Saratov Oblast bear this name:

- Sosnovka, Atkarsky District, Saratov Oblast, a selo in Atkarsky District
- Sosnovka, Baltaysky District, Saratov Oblast, a selo in Baltaysky District
- Sosnovka, Krasnoarmeysky District, Saratov Oblast, a selo in Krasnoarmeysky District
- Sosnovka, Marksovsky District, Saratov Oblast, a selo in Marksovsky District
- Sosnovka, Saratovsky District, Saratov Oblast, a selo in Saratovsky District

=== Smolensk Oblast ===
As of 2012, three rural localities in Smolensk Oblast bear this name:

- Sosnovka, Desnogorsk Urban Okrug, Smolensk Oblast, a village under the administrative jurisdiction of Desnogorsk Urban Okrug
- Sosnovka, Vyazemsky District, Smolensk Oblast, a village in Tumanovskoye Rural Settlement of Vyazemsky District
- Sosnovka, Yelninsky District, Smolensk Oblast, a village in Mazovskoye Rural Settlement of Yelninsky District

=== Sverdlovsk Oblast ===
As of 2012, four rural localities in Sverdlovsk Oblast bear this name:

- Sosnovka, Karpinsk, Sverdlovsk Oblast, a settlement under the administrative jurisdiction of the Town of Karpinsk
- Sosnovka, Irbitsky District, Sverdlovsk Oblast, a village in Irbitsky District
- Sosnovka, Nevyansky District, Sverdlovsk Oblast, a village in Nevyansky District
- Sosnovka, Talitsky District, Sverdlovsk Oblast, a settlement in Talitsky District

=== Tambov Oblast ===
As of 2012, three inhabited localities in Tambov Oblast bear this name:

Urban localities

- Sosnovka, Sosnovsky District, Tambov Oblast, a work settlement in Sosnovsky Settlement Council in Sosnovsky District

Rural localities

- Sosnovka, Kirsanovsky District, Tambov Oblast, a settlement in Maryinsky Selsoviet of Kirsanovsky District
- Sosnovka, Mordovsky District, Tambov Oblast, a selo in Sosnovsky Selsoviet of Mordovsky District

=== Republic of Tatarstan ===
As of 2012, eight rural localities in the Republic of Tatarstan bear this name:

- Sosnovka, Aksubayevsky District, Republic of Tatarstan, a settlement in Aksubayevsky District
- Sosnovka, Aksubayevsky District, Republic of Tatarstan, a village in Aksubayevsky District
- Sosnovka, Almetyevsky District, Republic of Tatarstan, a settlement in Almetyevsky District
- Sosnovka, Bugulminsky District, Republic of Tatarstan, a village in Bugulminsky District
- Sosnovka, Cheremshansky District, Republic of Tatarstan, a village in Cheremshansky District
- Sosnovka, Kaybitsky District, Republic of Tatarstan, a village in Kaybitsky District
- Sosnovka, Nurlatsky District, Republic of Tatarstan, a village in Nurlatsky District
- Sosnovka, Vysokogorsky District, Republic of Tatarstan, a selo in Vysokogorsky District

=== Tomsk Oblast ===
As of 2012, one rural locality in Tomsk Oblast bears this name:

- Sosnovka, Tomsk Oblast, a selo in Kargasoksky District

=== Tula Oblast ===
As of 2012, three rural localities in Tula Oblast bear this name:

- Sosnovka, Aleksinsky District, Tula Oblast, a village in Bunyrevsky Rural Okrug of Aleksinsky District
- Sosnovka, Chernsky District, Tula Oblast, a village in Krestovskaya Rural Administration of Chernsky District
- Sosnovka, Venyovsky District, Tula Oblast, a village in Mordvessky Rural Okrug of Venyovsky District

=== Tuva Republic ===
As of 2012, one rural locality in the Tuva Republic bears this name:

- Sosnovka, Tuva Republic, a selo in Durgen Sumon (rural settlement) of Tandinsky District

=== Tver Oblast ===
As of 2012, eight rural localities in Tver Oblast bear this name:

- Sosnovka, Firovsky District, Tver Oblast, a settlement in Velikooktyabrskoye Rural Settlement of Firovsky District
- Sosnovka, Kalyazinsky District, Tver Oblast, a village in Starobislovskoye Rural Settlement of Kalyazinsky District
- Sosnovka, Likhoslavlsky District, Tver Oblast, a village in Tolmachevskoye Rural Settlement of Likhoslavlsky District
- Sosnovka, Maksatikhinsky District, Tver Oblast, a village in Zarechenskoye Rural Settlement of Maksatikhinsky District
- Sosnovka, Rzhevsky District, Tver Oblast, a village in Khoroshevo Rural Settlement of Rzhevsky District
- Sosnovka, Selizharovsky District, Tver Oblast, a village in Dmitrovskoye Rural Settlement of Selizharovsky District
- Sosnovka, Sonkovsky District, Tver Oblast, a village in Gorskoye Rural Settlement of Sonkovsky District
- Sosnovka, Torzhoksky District, Tver Oblast, a village in Sukromlenskoye Rural Settlement of Torzhoksky District

=== Tyumen Oblast ===
As of 2012, four rural localities in Tyumen Oblast bear this name:

- Sosnovka, Nizhnetavdinsky District, Tyumen Oblast, a village in Cherepanovsky Rural Okrug of Nizhnetavdinsky District
- Sosnovka, Uporovsky District, Tyumen Oblast, a village in Nizhnemanaysky Rural Okrug of Uporovsky District
- Sosnovka, Yalutorovsky District, Tyumen Oblast, a village in Pamyatninsky Rural Okrug of Yalutorovsky District
- Sosnovka, Zavodoukovsky District, Tyumen Oblast, a selo in Zavodoukovsky District

=== Udmurt Republic ===
As of 2012, five rural localities in the Udmurt Republic bear this name:

- Sosnovka, Alnashsky District, Udmurt Republic, a village in Azamatovsky Selsoviet of Alnashsky District
- Sosnovka, Balezinsky District, Udmurt Republic, a village in Kirshonsky Selsoviet of Balezinsky District
- Sosnovka, Malopurginsky District, Udmurt Republic, a village in Ilyinsky Selsoviet of Malopurginsky District
- Sosnovka, Sharkansky District, Udmurt Republic, a selo in Sosnovsky Selsoviet of Sharkansky District
- Sosnovka, Yarsky District, Udmurt Republic, a village in Yelovsky Selsoviet of Yarsky District

=== Ulyanovsk Oblast ===
As of 2012, four rural localities in Ulyanovsk Oblast bear this name:

- Sosnovka, Karsunsky District, Ulyanovsk Oblast, a selo in Sosnovsky Rural Okrug of Karsunsky District
- Sosnovka, Maynsky District, Ulyanovsk Oblast, a selo under the administrative jurisdiction of Ignatovsky Settlement Okrug in Maynsky District
- Sosnovka, Nikolayevsky District, Ulyanovsk Oblast, a village in Dubrovsky Rural Okrug of Nikolayevsky District
- Sosnovka, Terengulsky District, Ulyanovsk Oblast, a selo in Belogorsky Rural Okrug of Terengulsky District

=== Vladimir Oblast ===
As of 2012, two rural localities in Vladimir Oblast bear this name:

- Sosnovka, Kameshkovsky District, Vladimir Oblast, a village in Kameshkovsky District
- Sosnovka, Vyaznikovsky District, Vladimir Oblast, a village in Vyaznikovsky District

=== Volgograd Oblast ===
As of 2012, two rural localities in Volgograd Oblast bear this name:

- Sosnovka, Kotovsky District, Volgograd Oblast, a selo in Burluksky Selsoviet of Kotovsky District
- Sosnovka, Rudnyansky District, Volgograd Oblast, a selo in Sosnovsky Selsoviet of Rudnyansky District

=== Vologda Oblast ===
As of 2012, six rural localities in Vologda Oblast bear this name:

- Sosnovka, Babushkinsky District, Vologda Oblast, a village in Podbolotny Selsoviet of Babushkinsky District
- Sosnovka, Cherepovetsky District, Vologda Oblast, a settlement in Korotovsky Selsoviet of Cherepovetsky District
- Sosnovka, Kaduysky District, Vologda Oblast, a settlement in Baranovsky Selsoviet of Kaduysky District
- Sosnovka, Kharovsky District, Vologda Oblast, a village in Kharovsky Selsoviet of Kharovsky District
- Sosnovka, Sheksninsky District, Vologda Oblast, a village in Yershovsky Selsoviet of Sheksninsky District
- Sosnovka, Vologodsky District, Vologda Oblast, a settlement in Sosnovsky Selsoviet of Vologodsky District

=== Voronezh Oblast ===
As of 2012, one rural locality in Voronezh Oblast bears this name:

- Sosnovka, Voronezh Oblast, a settlement under the administrative jurisdiction of Ertil Urban Settlement in Ertilsky District

=== Yaroslavl Oblast ===
As of 2012, four rural localities in Yaroslavl Oblast bear this name:

- Sosnovka, Borisoglebsky District, Yaroslavl Oblast, a village in Vysokovsky Rural Okrug of Borisoglebsky District
- Sosnovka, Danilovsky District, Yaroslavl Oblast, a village in Danilovsky Rural Okrug of Danilovsky District
- Sosnovka, Kolkinsky Rural Okrug, Pervomaysky District, Yaroslavl Oblast, a village in Kolkinsky Rural Okrug of Pervomaysky District
- Sosnovka, Kozsky Rural Okrug, Pervomaysky District, Yaroslavl Oblast, a village in Kozsky Rural Okrug of Pervomaysky District

=== Zabaykalsky Krai ===
As of 2012, one rural locality in Zabaykalsky Krai bears this name:

- Sosnovka, Zabaykalsky Krai, a selo in Khiloksky District

== Alternative names ==
- Sosnovka, alternative name of Zelenaya Roshcha, a village in Maslinsky Selsoviet of Mishkinsky District in Kurgan Oblast; 55°13′N 63°47′E
- Sosnovka, alternative name of Sosnovo, a village in Izvarskoye Settlement Municipal Formation of Volosovsky District in Leningrad Oblast; 59°13′N 29°38′E
- Sosnovka, alternative name of Lesnoy, a settlement in Panovsky Selsoviet of Rebrikhinsky District in Altai Krai; 53°1′N 82°15′E

== See also ==
- Sosnówka (disambiguation)
- Sosnivka (Sosnovka)
