= Barannikovo =

Barannikovo Баранниково
- Selo
- Location within Volgograd Oblast Location within Russia
- Coordinates: 50°53′N 44°34′E
- Country: Russia
- Region: Volgograd Oblast
- District: Rudnyansky District
- Time zone: UTC+4:00

Barannikovo (Russian: Баранниково) is a rural locality (a selo) in Osichkovskoye Rural Settlement, Rudnyansky District, Volgograd Oblast, Russia. The population was 175 as of 2010. There are 4 streets.

== Geography ==
Barannikovo is located in steppe, on the Khopyorsko-Buzulukskaya Plain, 14 km north of Rudnya (the district's administrative centre) by road. Podkuykovo is the nearest rural locality.
