= Vetluga (disambiguation) =

Vetluga is a town in Vetluzhsky District of Nizhny Novgorod Oblast, Russia.

Vetluga may also refer to:

- Vetluga Urban Settlement, a municipal formation which the town of district significance of Vetluga in Vetluzhsky District of Nizhny Novgorod Oblast, Russia is incorporated as
- Vetluga (river), a river in Russia, a left tributary of the Volga
- GAZ-5903V Vetluga, Russian heavy firefighting vehicle
