= Ushinka =

Ushinka Ушинка
- Selo
- Location within Volgograd Oblast Location within Russia
- Coordinates: 50°38′N 44°29′E
- Country: Russia
- Region: Volgograd Oblast
- District: Rudnyansky District
- Time zone: UTC+4:00

Ushinka (Russian: Ушинка) is a rural locality (a selo) in Lopukhovskoye Rural Settlement, Rudnyansky District, Volgograd Oblast, Russia. The population was 112 as of 2010.

== Geography ==
Ushinka is located 27 km southwest of Rudnya (the district's administrative centre) by road. Lopukhovka is the nearest rural locality.
