= Matyshevo (settlement) =

Matyshevo Матышево
- Settlement
- Location within Volgograd Oblast Location within Russia
- Coordinates: 50°51′N 44°11′E
- Country: Russia
- Region: Volgograd Oblast
- District: Rudnyansky District
- Time zone: UTC+4:00

Matyshevo (Russian: Матышево) is a rural locality (a settlement) in Matyshevskoye Rural Settlement, Rudnyansky District, Volgograd Oblast, Russia. The population was 134 as of 2010.

== Geography ==
Matyshevo is located in steppe, on the Khopyorsko-Buzulukskaya Plain, 30 km northwest of Rudnya (the district's administrative centre) by road. Matyshevo (selo) is the nearest rural locality.
