= Krutoye, Volgograd Oblast =

Krutoye Крутое
- Selo
- Location within Volgograd Oblast Location within Russia
- Coordinates: 51°00′N 44°25′E
- Country: Russia
- Region: Volgograd Oblast
- District: Rudnyansky District
- Time zone: UTC+4:00

Krutoye (Russian: Крутое) is a rural locality (a selo) in Lemeshkinskoye Rural Settlement, Rudnyansky District, Volgograd Oblast, Russia. The population was 8 as of 2010. There is 1 street.

== Geography ==
Krutoye is located in steppe, on the Khopyorsko-Buzulukskaya Plain, 19 km west of Rudnya (the district's administrative centre) by road. Ilmen is the nearest rural locality.
