= Gymnazium Union of Russia =

Russian government-backed educational organization

The Gymnazium Union of Russia (Russian: Гимнази́ческий Союз Росси́и) is a government-backed open network of Russian gymnaziums, lyceums and secondary schools.

The Union was introduced by Andrei Fursenko, the Russian Education Minister, on November 6, 2007, at a major conference in education held at Saint Petersburg State University.

The Union is sponsored and broadly supported by the Russian Foundation for Education Support, a Gazprom's non-profit foundation. It makes a part of the National Priority Projects and is directly supported by Russian President Dmitry Medvedev and the Russian Ministry of Education.

The infrastructure of the Union relies on videoconferencing and allows to hold discussion meetings between member schools, befriended universities and research institutions, and the headquarters of the Foundation for Education Support.

As of early April 2008, the Union brings together about 100 schools in all seven federal Russian districts and rapidly grows.

== Members ==
=== Central Federal District ===
==== Belgorod Oblast ====
- Gymnazium 2, Belgorod (profile, website)
- Lyceym 3, Stary Oskol (profile, website)
- A.M. Rudy Borisov School 1, Borisov (profile, website)

==== Bryansk Oblast ====
- Gymnazium 1, Bryansk (profile, website)

==== Kaluga Oblast ====
- Obninsk Gymnazium, Obninsk (profile)

==== Kostroma Oblast ====
- Lyceum 3, Galich (profile, website)

==== Moscow Oblast and the Federal City of Moscow ====
- Gymnazium 1583, Moscow (profile)

==== Orel Oblast ====
- Livny S.N. Bulgakov Lyceum, Livny (profile)

==== Tambov Oblast ====
- L.S. Demin Kadetsky Korpus, Tambov-4 (profile, website)
- Michurinsk Lyceum-Boarding School, Michurinsk (profile, website)
- Saint Pitirim Gymnazium 7, Tambov (profile, website)
- Uvarovo Lyceum, Uvarovo (profile, website)

==== Tula Oblast ====
- Gymnazium 1, Tula (profile)

==== Tver Oblast ====
- Gymnazium 8, Tver (profile, website)
- Gymnazium 2, Nelidovo (profile, website)

==== Yaroslavl Oblast ====
- Gymnazium 3, Yaroslavl (profile, website)

=== Northwestern Federal District ===
==== Arkhangelsk Oblast ====
- Gymnazium 21, Arkhangelsk (profile, website)
- Gymnazium 6, Arkhangelsk (profile, website)
- Lyceum 17, Severodvinsk (profile, website)
- Severodvinsk City Gymnazium, Severodvinsk (profile)
- Yagrinskaya Gymnazium, Severodvinsk (profile, website)
- Humanities Gymnazium 8, Arkhangelsk (profile)
- M.V. Lomonosov Lyceum, Arkhangelsk (profile)
- Novodvinsk Gymnazium, Novodvinsk (profile)
- Ecological and Biological Lyceum, Arkhangelsk (profile)

==== Kaliningrad Oblast ====
- Gymnazium 22, Kaliningrad (profile, website)

==== Komi Republic ====
- Gymnazium 2, Vorkuta (profile)

==== Leningrad Oblast ====
- Vyborg Gymnazium, Vyborg (profile)
- Lyceum 1, Vsevolozhsk (profile, website)
- Lyceum 8, Sosnovy Bor (profile)
- Gatchina K.D. Ushinsky Gymnazium (profile, website)

==== Nenets Autonomous Okrug ====
- Secondary School 1, Naryan-Mar (profile)
- A.P. Pyrerki Boarding School, Naryan-Mar (profile, website)

==== Pskov Oblast ====
- Lyceum 10, Velikiye Luki (profile)
- Lyceum 11, Velikiye Luki (profile, website)
- Humanities Lyceum, Pskov (profile, website)
- Izborsk Lyceum, Izborsk (profile)
- Multiprofile Law Lyceum 8, Pskov (profile, website)
- Pedagogical Lyceum, Velikiye Luki (profile)
- Pechory Gymnazium, Pechory (profile, website)
- Pechory Secondary School 2, Pechory (profile, website)
- Pskov Linguistic Gymnazium, Pskov (profile, website)
- Pskov Pedagogical Complex, Pskov (profile)
- Pskov Technical Lyceum, Pskov (profile)

==== Federal City of Saint Petersburg ====
- Second Saint Petersburg Gymnazium, Saint Petersburg (profile, website)
- Gymnazium 41, Saint Petersburg (profile, website)
- Gymnazium 11, Saint Petersburg (profile, website)
- Gymnazium 513, Saint Petersburg (profile, website)
- Gymnazium 528, Saint Petersburg (profile, website)
- Gymnazium 622, Saint Petersburg (profile, website)
- Gymnazium 107, Saint Petersburg (profile, website
- Gymnazium 295, Saint Petersburg (profile, website)
- Lyceum 150, Saint Petersburg (profile, website)
- Lyceum 590, Saint Petersburg (profile, website)
- Pedagogical College 1, Saint Petersburg (profile, website)
- Pedagogical College 8, Saint Petersburg (profile, website)
- Saint Petersburg Marine Technical College, Saint Petersburg (profile, website)
- Kadetsky Korpus Zheleznodorozhnykh Voisk, Petergof (profile, website)
- Akademicheskaya Gimnaziya (website)
- Saint Petersburg Lyceum 239, Saint Petersburg (website)

==== Vologda Oblast ====
- Girls' Humanities Gymnazium, Cherepovets (profile, website)
- Gymnazium 2, Vologda (profile, website)
- Cadets' Boarding School, Sokol (profile, website)
- Vologda Multiprofile Lyceum, Vologda (profile, website)
- Veliky Ustyug Gymnazium, Veliky Ustyug (profile, website)
- Ustyuzhna Gymnazium, Ustyuzhna (profile)

=== Southern Federal District ===
==== Astrakhan Oblast ====
- Gymnazium 3, Astrakhan (profile, website)

==== Krasnodar Krai ====
- Evrika Gymnazium, Anapa (profile, website)
- Gymnazium 6, Tikhoretsk (profile,)

==== Rostov Oblast ====
- Gymnazium 25, Rostov-on-Don (profile, website)

==== Stavropol Krai ====
- Gymnazium 4, Pyatigorsk (profile, website)
- Lyceum 5, Stavropol (profile, website)

=== Volga Federal District ===
==== Republic of Bashkortostan ====
- Bashkirsky Lyceum, Sibai (profile, website)
- Duvanski Rayon RLI, Mesyagutovo (profile, website)
- Sterlitamak Lyceum-Boarding School 2, Sterlitamak (profile,)
- Lyceum 1, Bolsheustyinskoye (profile, website)
- Gymnazium 14, Beloretsk (profile, website)

==== Chuvash Republic ====
- Gymnazium 6, Novocheboksarsk (profile, website)
- Gymnazium 8, Shumerlya (profile)

==== Mari El Republic ====
- RME Urgaksh Lyceum-Boarding School, Urgaksh (profile)
- Kosmodemyansk Gymnazium, Kosmodemyansk (profile)
- Kosmodemyansk Lyceum, Kosmodemyansk (profile)

==== Orenburg Oblast ====
- Gymnazium 2, Orsk (profile, website)
- Gymnazium 4, Orenburg (profile, website)

==== Ulyanovsk Oblast ====
- Undory General Lyceum, Undory (profile, website)

=== Urals Federal District ===
==== Tyumen Oblast ====
- Secondary School 8, Noyabrsk (profile, website)

=== Siberian Federal District ===
==== Republic of Buryatia ====
- Gymnazium 33, Ulan Ude (profile, website)
- Kurumkan Lyceum, Kurumkan (profile)

==== Irkutsk Oblast ====
- Secondary School 9, Ust-Ilimsk (profile, website)

==== Krasnoyarsk Krai ====
- Gymnazium 164, Zelenogorsk (profile, website)

=== Far Eastern Federal District ===
==== Sakha Republic ====
- Aldan Gymnazium, Aldan (profile, website)
- Gymnazium 1, Neryungri (profile, website)
- Maya Gimnazium, Maya (profile, website
- Pokrovsk Gymnazium, Pokrovsk (profile)
