= Obvinsk =

Obvinsk Обвинск
- Selo
- Location within Perm Krai Location within Russia
- Coordinates: 58°29′N 54°51′E
- Country: Russia
- Region: Perm Krai
- District: Karagaysky District
- Time zone: UTC+5:00

Obvinsk (Russian: Обвинск) is a rural locality (a selo) and the administrative center of Obvinskoye Rural Settlement, Karagaysky District, Perm Krai, Russia. The population was 583 as of 2010. There are 21 streets.

== Geography ==
Obvinsk is located 30 km north of Karagay (the district's administrative centre) by road. Kolyshkino is the nearest rural locality.
