= Nizhny Kushcher =

Nizhny Kushcher Нижний Кущер
- Village
- Location within Perm Krai Location within Russia
- Coordinates: 58°10′N 54°59′E
- Country: Russia
- Region: Perm Krai
- District: Karagaysky District
- Time zone: UTC+5:00

Nizhny Kushcher (Russian: Нижний Кущер) is a rural locality (a village) in Kozmodemyanskoye Rural Settlement, Karagaysky District, Perm Krai, Russia. The population was 188 as of 2010. There are 4 streets.

== Geography ==
Nizhny Kushcher is located 15 km (9.3 mi) northeast of Karagay (the district's administrative centre) by road. Verkhny Kushcher is the nearest rural locality.
