= Bolshoye Sudachye =

Bolshoye Sudachye Большое Судачье
- Selo
- Location within Volgograd Oblast Location within Russia
- Coordinates: 50°49′N 44°05′E
- Country: Russia
- Region: Volgograd Oblast
- District: Rudnyansky District
- Time zone: UTC+4:00

Bolshoye Sudachye (Russian: Большое Судачье) is a rural locality (a selo) and the administrative center of Bolshesudachenskoye Rural Settlement, Rudnyansky District, Volgograd Oblast, Russia. The population was 1,080 as of 2010. There are 10 streets.

== Geography ==
Bolshoye Sudachye is located in steppe, on the Khopyorsko-Buzulukskaya Plain, 41 km northwest of Rudnya (the district's administrative centre) by road. Matyshevo is the nearest rural locality.
