= Lopukhovka =

Lopukhovka Лопуховка
- Selo
- Location within Volgograd Oblast Location within Russia
- Coordinates: 50°37′N 44°28′E
- Country: Russia
- Region: Volgograd Oblast
- District: Rudnyansky District
- Time zone: UTC+4:00

Lopukhovka (Russian: Лопухо́вка) is a rural locality (a selo) and the administrative center of Lopukhovskoye Rural Settlement, Rudnyansky District, Volgograd Oblast, Russia. The population was 939 as of 2010. There are 5 streets.

== Geography ==
Lopukhovka is located 30 km southwest of Rudnya (the district's administrative centre) by road. Ushinka is the nearest rural locality.
