= Mityakino =

Mityakino Митякино
- Selo
- Location within Volgograd Oblast Location within Russia
- Coordinates: 50°40′N 44°33′E
- Country: Russia
- Region: Volgograd Oblast
- District: Rudnyansky District
- Time zone: UTC+4:00

Mityakino (Russian: Митякино) is a rural locality (a selo) in Rudnyanskoye Urban Settlement, Rudnyansky District, Volgograd Oblast, Russia. The population was 39 as of 2010.

== Geography ==
Mityakino is located in forest steppe, 21 km south of Rudnya (the district's administrative centre) by road. Beryozovka is the nearest rural locality.
