= Matyshevo =

Matyshevo Матышево
- Selo
- Location within Volgograd Oblast Location within Russia
- Coordinates: 50°49′N 44°11′E
- Country: Russia
- Region: Volgograd Oblast
- District: Rudnyansky District
- Time zone: UTC+4:00

Matyshevo (Russian: Матышево) is a rural locality (a selo) and the administrative center of Matyshevskoye Rural Settlement, Rudnyansky District, Volgograd Oblast, Russia. The population was 1,523 as of 2010. There are 14 streets.

== Geography ==
Matyshevo is located 32 km west of Rudnya (the district's administrative centre) by road. Matyshevo (settlement) is the nearest rural locality.

== Notable people ==
- Anna Glushenkova, Russian-born Uzbekistani chemist
