= Mendeleyevo =

Mendeleyevo (Russian: Менделе́ево) is the name of several inhabited localities in Russia.

== Urban localities ==
- Mendeleyevo, Moscow Oblast, a work settlement in Solnechnogorsky District of Moscow Oblast

== Rural localities ==
- Mendeleyevo, Kaliningrad Oblast, a settlement in Dobrinsky Rural Okrug of Guryevsky District of Kaliningrad Oblast
- Mendeleyevo, Perm Krai, a rural locality classified as a "settlement at the station" in Karagaysky District of Perm Krai

== Historical localities ==
- Mendeleyevo, formerly an inhabited locality; now Mendeleyevo Microdistrict—a part of the city of Kaliningrad, Kaliningrad Oblast
