= Yarino, Karagaysky District, Perm Krai =

Yarino Ярино
- Village
- Location within Perm Krai Location within Russia
- Coordinates: 58°29′N 54°51′E
- Country: Russia
- Region: Perm Krai
- District: Karagaysky District
- Time zone: UTC+5:00

Yarino (Russian: Ярино) is a rural locality (a village) and the administrative center of Nikolskoye Rural Settlement, Karagaysky District, Perm Krai, Russia. The population was 350 as of 2010. There are 8 streets.

== Geography ==
Yarino is located on the Bolshaya Niya River, 14 km northeast of Karagay (the district's administrative centre) by road. Gudyri is the nearest rural locality.
