= Yegorovka-na-Medveditse =

Yegorovka-na-Medveditse Егоровка-на-Медведице
- Selo
- Location within Volgograd Oblast Location within Russia
- Coordinates: 50°50′N 44°41′E
- Country: Russia
- Region: Volgograd Oblast
- District: Rudnyansky District
- Time zone: UTC+4:00

Yegorovka-na-Medveditse (Russian: Егоровка-на-Медведице) is a rural locality (a selo) in Rudnyanskoye Urban Settlement, Rudnyansky District, Volgograd Oblast, Russia. The population was 47 as of 2010. There are 2 streets.

== Geography ==
Yegorovka-na-Medveditse is located in steppe, on the Medveditsa River, 57 km northeast of Rudnya (the district's administrative centre) by road. Melzavod is the nearest rural locality.
