= Maloye Matyshevo =

Maloye Matyshevo Малое Матышево
- Selo
- Location within Volgograd Oblast Location within Russia
- Coordinates: 50°50′N 44°09′E
- Country: Russia
- Region: Volgograd Oblast
- District: Rudnyansky District
- Time zone: UTC+4:00

Maloye Matyshevo (Russian: Малое Матышево) is a rural locality (a selo) in Matyshevskoye Rural Settlement, Rudnyansky District, Volgograd Oblast, Russia. The population was 42 as of 2010.

== Geography ==
Maloye Matyshevo is located in steppe, on the Khopyorsko-Buzulukskaya Plain, 34 km northwest of Rudnya (the district's administrative centre) by road. Matyshevo (settlement) is the nearest rural locality.
