= Sadovy, Rudnyansky District, Volgograd Oblast =

Sadovy Садовый
- Settlement
- Location within Volgograd Oblast Location within Russia
- Coordinates: 50°52′N 44°34′E
- Country: Russia
- Region: Volgograd Oblast
- District: Rudnyansky District
- Time zone: UTC+4:00

Sadovy (Russian: Садовый) is a rural locality (a settlement) in Rudnyanskoye Urban Settlement, Rudnyansky District, Volgograd Oblast, Russia. The population was 231 as of 2010. There are 2 streets.

== Geography ==
Sadovy is located in steppe, on the left bank of the Shchelkan River, 8 km north of Rudnya (the district's administrative centre) by road. Podkuykovo is the nearest rural locality.
