= Novokrasino =

Novokrasino Новокрасино
- Selo
- Location within Volgograd Oblast Location within Russia
- Coordinates: 50°55′N 44°31′E
- Country: Russia
- Region: Volgograd Oblast
- District: Rudnyansky District
- Time zone: UTC+4:00

Novokrasino (Russian: Новокрасино) is a rural locality (a selo) in Osichkovskoye Rural Settlement, Rudnyansky District, Volgograd Oblast, Russia. The population was 122 as of 2010.

== Geography ==
Novokrasino is located east from the Shchelkan River, 15 km north of Rudnya (the district's administrative centre) by road. Osichki is the nearest rural locality.
