= Lemeshkino =

Lemeshkino Лемешкино
- Selo
- Location within Volgograd Oblast Location within Russia
- Coordinates: 51°00′N 44°28′E
- Country: Russia
- Region: Volgograd Oblast
- District: Rudnyansky District
- Time zone: UTC+4:00

Lemeshkino (Russian: Леме́шкино) is a rural locality (a selo) and the administrative center of Lemeshkinskoye Rural Settlement, Rudnyansky District, Volgograd Oblast, Russia. The population was 1,181 as of 2010. There are 14 streets.

== Geography ==
Lemeshkino is located in steppe, on the Khopyorsko-Buzulukskaya Plain, 25 km north of Rudnya (the district's administrative centre) by road. Borodayevka is the nearest rural locality.
