= Russkaya Bundevka =

Russkaya Bundevka Русская Бундевка
- Selo
- Location within Volgograd Oblast Location within Russia
- Coordinates: 50°48′N 44°31′E
- Country: Russia
- Region: Volgograd Oblast
- District: Rudnyansky District
- Time zone: UTC+4:00

Russkaya Bundevka (Russian: Русская Бундевка) is a rural locality (a selo) in Rudnyanskoye Urban Settlement, Rudnyansky District, Volgograd Oblast, Russia. The population was 194 as of 2010. There are 2 streets.

== Geography ==
Russkaya Bundevka is located in steppe, 19 km west of Rudnya (the district's administrative centre) by road. Ilmen is the nearest rural locality.
