= Stary Kondal =

Stary Kondal Старый Кондаль
- Selo
- Location within Volgograd Oblast Location within Russia
- Coordinates: 50°33′N 44°27′E
- Country: Russia
- Region: Volgograd Oblast
- District: Rudnyansky District
- Time zone: UTC+4:00

Stary Kondal (Russian: Старый Кондаль) is a rural locality (a selo) in Gromkovskoye Rural Settlement, Rudnyansky District, Volgograd Oblast, Russia. The population was 78 as of 2010. There are 4 streets.

== Geography ==
Stary Kondal is located in steppe, on the right bank of the Medveditsa River, 42 km (26 mi) southwest of Rudnya (the district's administrative centre) by road. Gromki is the nearest rural locality.
