= Borodayevka =

Borodayevka Бородаевка
- Selo
- Location within Volgograd Oblast Location within Russia
- Coordinates: 50°59′N 44°29′E
- Country: Russia
- Region: Volgograd Oblast
- District: Rudnyansky District
- Time zone: UTC+4:00

Borodayevka (Russian: Бородаевка) is a rural locality (a selo) in Lemeshkinskoye Rural Settlement, Rudnyansky District, Volgograd Oblast, Russia. The population was 253 as of 2010. There are 3 streets.

== Geography ==
Borodayevka is located in steppe, on the Khopyorsko-Buzulukskaya Plain, 24 km north of Rudnya (the district's administrative centre) by road. Lemeshkino is the nearest rural locality.
