= Novy Kondal =

Novy Kondal Новый Кондаль
- Selo
- Location within Volgograd Oblast Location within Russia
- Coordinates: 50°32′N 44°24′E
- Country: Russia
- Region: Volgograd Oblast
- District: Rudnyansky District
- Time zone: UTC+4:00

Novy Kondal (Russian: Новый Кондаль) is a rural locality (a selo) in Gromkovskoye Rural Settlement, Rudnyansky District, Volgograd Oblast, Russia. The population was 104 as of 2010. There are 3 streets.

== Geography ==
Novy Kondal is located in steppe, 44 km southwest of Rudnya (the district's administrative centre) by road. Gromki is the nearest rural locality.
