= Podkuykovo =

Podkuykovo Подкуйково
- Selo
- Location within Volgograd Oblast Location within Russia
- Coordinates: 50°53′N 44°33′E
- Country: Russia
- Region: Volgograd Oblast
- District: Rudnyansky District
- Time zone: UTC+4:00

Podkuykovo (Russian: Подкуйково) is a rural locality (a selo) in Osichkovskoye Rural Settlement, Rudnyansky District, Volgograd Oblast, Russia. The population was 347 as of 2010. There are 5 streets.

== Geography ==
Podkuykovo is located in steppe, on the Khopyorsko-Buzulukskaya Plain, 10 km north of Rudnya (the district's administrative centre) by road. Barannikovo is the nearest rural locality.
