= Sosnovka, Rudnyansky District, Volgograd Oblast =

Sosnovka Сосновка
- Selo
- Location within Volgograd Oblast Location within Russia
- Coordinates: 50°47′N 44°16′E
- Country: Russia
- Region: Volgograd Oblast
- District: Rudnyansky District
- Time zone: UTC+4:00

Sosnovka (Russian: Сосновка) is a rural locality (a selo) and the administrative center of Sosnovskoye Rural Settlement, Rudnyansky District, Volgograd Oblast, Russia. The population was 582 as of 2010. There are 6 streets.

== Geography ==
Sosnovka is located in steppe, on the right bank of the Tersa River, 32 km west of Rudnya (the district's administrative centre) by road. Matyshevo is the nearest rural locality.
