= Kotelniki (disambiguation) =

Kotelniki is a town in Moscow Oblast, Russia.

Kotelniki may also refer to:

- Kotelniki (Moscow Metro), a metro station to be open in 2014 on the Tagansko-Krasnopresnenskaya Line of the Moscow Metro, Moscow, Russia
- Kotelniki, Perm Krai, a rural locality (a village) in Perm Krai, Russia
