= Kozmodemyansk, Perm Krai =

Kozmodemyansk Козьмодемьянск
- Selo
- Location within Perm Krai Location within Russia
- Coordinates: 58°23′N 55°03′E
- Country: Russia
- Region: Perm Krai
- District: Karagaysky District
- Time zone: UTC+5:00

Kozmodemyansk (Russian: Козьмодемьянск) is a rural locality (a selo) and the administrative center of Kozmodemyanskoye Rural Settlement, Karagaysky District, Perm Krai, Russia. The population was 602 as of 2010. There are 15 streets.

== Geography ==
Kozmodemyansk is located on the Yazva River, 19 km northeast of Karagay (the district's administrative centre) by road. Dubrenyata is the nearest rural locality.
