= Mendeleyevo, Perm Krai =

Mendeleyevo Менделеево
- Settlement
- Location within Perm Krai Location within Russia
- Coordinates: 58°10′N 54°59′E
- Country: Russia
- Region: Perm Krai
- District: Karagaysky District
- Time zone: UTC+5:00

Mendeleyevo (Russian: Менделеево) is a rural locality (a settlement) and the administrative center of Mendeleyevskoye Rural Settlement, Karagaysky District, Perm Krai, Russia. The population was 3,169 as of 2010. There are 57 streets.

== Geography ==
Mendeleyevo is located 12 km south of Karagay (the district's administrative centre) by road. Savino is the nearest rural locality.
