= Rachevo =

Rachevo (Russian: Рачево) is the name of several rural localities in Russia:

- Rachevo, Perm Krai, a village in Karagaysky District of Perm Krai
- Rachevo, Pskov Oblast, a village in Pechorsky District of Pskov Oblast
- Rachevo, Tver Oblast, a selo in Nivskoye Rural Settlement of Krasnokholmsky District of Tver Oblast
