= Karagaysky =

Karagaysky (masculine), Karagayskaya (feminine), or Karagayskoye (neuter) may refer to:

- Karagaysky District, a district of Perm Krai, Russia
- Karagaysky (rural locality), a rural locality (a settlement) in Chelyabinsk Oblast, Russia
