= Mesyagutovo =

Mesyagutovo (Russian: Месягутово) is the name of two rural localities in the Republic of Bashkortostan, Russia:

- Mesyagutovo, Duvansky District, Republic of Bashkortostan, a selo in Duvansky District
- Mesyagutovo, Yanaulsky District, Republic of Bashkortostan, a selo in Yanaulsky District
