= Dadanovka =

Dadanovka Дадановка
- Village
- Location within Bashkortostan Location within Russia
- Coordinates: 53°48′N 55°49′E
- Country: Russia
- Region: Bashkortostan
- District: Aurgazinsky District

Population (2010)
  - Total: 67
- Time zone: UTC+5:00

Dadanovka (Russian: Дадановка) is a rural locality (a village) in Meselinsky Selsoviet, Aurgazinsky District, Bashkortostan, Russia. The population was 67 as of 2010. There is 1 street.

== Geography ==
Dadanovka is located 32 km south of Tolbazy (the district's administrative centre) by road. Sosnovka is the nearest rural locality.
