= Kotelniki, Perm Krai =

Rural locality in Karagaysky District, Perm Krai, Russia

Kotelniki (Russian: Котельники) is a rural locality (a village) in Karagaysky District of Perm Krai, Russia.
