= Sosnówka =

Sosnówka may refer to:

- Sosnówka (lake), a reservoir in Jelenia Góra County, Lower Silesian Voivodeship, Poland

== Settlements ==
- Sosnówka, Grudziądz County, Kuyavian-Pomeranian Voivodeship (north-central Poland)
- Sosnówka, Wąbrzeźno County in Kuyavian-Pomeranian Voivodeship (north-central Poland)
- Sosnówka, Jelenia Góra County in Lower Silesian Voivodeship (south-west Poland)
- Sosnówka, Oleśnica County in Lower Silesian Voivodeship (south-west Poland)
- Sosnówka, Gmina Sosnówka, Biała County in Lublin Voivodeship (east Poland)
- Sosnówka, Lubartów County in Lublin Voivodeship (east Poland)
- Sosnówka, Ryki County in Lublin Voivodeship (east Poland)
- Sosnówka, Lubusz Voivodeship (west Poland)
- Sosnówka, Masovian Voivodeship (east-central Poland)
- Sosnówka, Opole Voivodeship (south-west Poland)
- Sosnówka, Podlaskie Voivodeship (north-east Poland)
- Sosnówka, Świętokrzyskie Voivodeship (south-central Poland)
- Sosnówka, West Pomeranian Voivodeship (north-west Poland)

== See also ==
- Sosnovka, several inhabited localities in Russia
- Sosnivka, a city in Lviv Oblast, Ukraine
