= Anna Glushenkova =

Uzbek chemist

- Born: Anna Ivanovna Glushenkova; August 1, 1926; Matyshevo, Soviet Union
- Died: April 18, 2017 (aged 90); Tashkent, Uzbekistan
- Occupation: chemist

Anna Ivanovna Glushenkova (1 August 1926, in Matyshevo, Soviet Union – 18 April 2017, in Tashkent) was a Russian–born Uzbekistani chemist, a prominent scientist in the field of chemistry and technology of natural compounds, Honored Scientist of the Republic of Uzbekistan, Academician of the Academy of Sciences of the Republic of Uzbekistan.

== Life ==
Anna Glushenkova was born on 1 August 1926 in the Rudninsky district of the Volgograd region of the Russian Federation. In 1948 she graduated from the Central Asian Industrial Institute (now Tashkent State Technical University), then defended her PhD and doctoral dissertation.

== Career ==
In 2000, Glushenkova was elected a full member of the Academy of Sciences of the Republic of Uzbekistan. During almost 70 years of her scientific and pedagogical career Glushenkova worked as a head of the department of the Tashkent Polytechnic Institute (now Tashkent State Technical University), senior researcher, head of laboratory, director of the Institute of Chemistry of Plant Substances Academy of Sciences, a member of the Presidium of the Academy of Sciences.

She was a deputy editor-in-chief of the magazine “Chemistry of Natural Compounds” (rus.“Химия природных соединений”).

Glushenkova is the author of over 400 scientific articles, books and monographs on theoretical and practical issues of chemistry and technology of natural compounds.

Under her supervision dozens of candidates and doctors of sciences were trained.

Glushenkova was awarded the honorary title “Honored Scientist of the Republic of Uzbekistan” and the order “Mekhnat Shukhrati”.

Anna Glushenkova died on 18 April 2017 in Tashkent at the age of 91.

== Awards and honors ==
- Honored Scientist of the Republic of Uzbekistan
- Mekhnat Shukhrati Order

== Works ==
- Lipids, Lipophilic Components and Essential Oils from Plant Sources, ISBN 9780857293220.
