= Kozmodemyansk =

Kozmodemyansk (Russian: Козьмодемьянск) is the name of several inhabited localities in Russia.

Urban localities

- Kozmodemyansk, Mari El Republic, a town in the Mari El Republic; 56°20′N 46°34′E

Rural localities

- Kozmodemyansk, Sovetsky District, Mari El Republic, a village in Mikhaylovsky Rural Okrug of Sovetsky District in the Mari El Republic; 56°39′N 48°19′E
- Kozmodemyansk, Perm Krai, a selo in Karagaysky District of Perm Krai
- Kozmodemyansk (selo), Yaroslavl Oblast, a selo in Melenkovsky Rural Okrug of Yaroslavsky District in Yaroslavl Oblast
- Kozmodemyansk (settlement), Yaroslavl Oblast, a settlement in Melenkovsky Rural Okrug of Yaroslavsky District in Yaroslavl Oblast
