= Bolshesukhoyazovo =

Village in Mishkinsky District, Bashkortostan, Russia

Bolshesukhoyazovo Большесухоязово
- Village
- Location within Bashkortostan Location within Russia
- Coordinates: 55°34′N 55°32′E
- Country: Russia
- Region: Bashkortostan
- District: Mishkinsky District
- Time zone: UTC+5:00

Bolshesukhoyazovo (Russian: Большесухоязово; Bashkir: Оло Сухояз, Olo Suxoyaz; Meadow Mari: Кугу Соказа, Kugu Sokaza) is a rural locality (a village) and the administrative centre of Bolshesukhoyazovsky Selsoviet, Mishkinsky District, Bashkortostan, Russia. The population was 604 as of 2010. There are 11 streets.

== Geography ==
Bolshesukhoyazovo is located 40 km west of Mishkino (the district's administrative centre) by road. Kurmanayevo is the nearest rural locality.
