= Vetluga (river) =

River in Russia

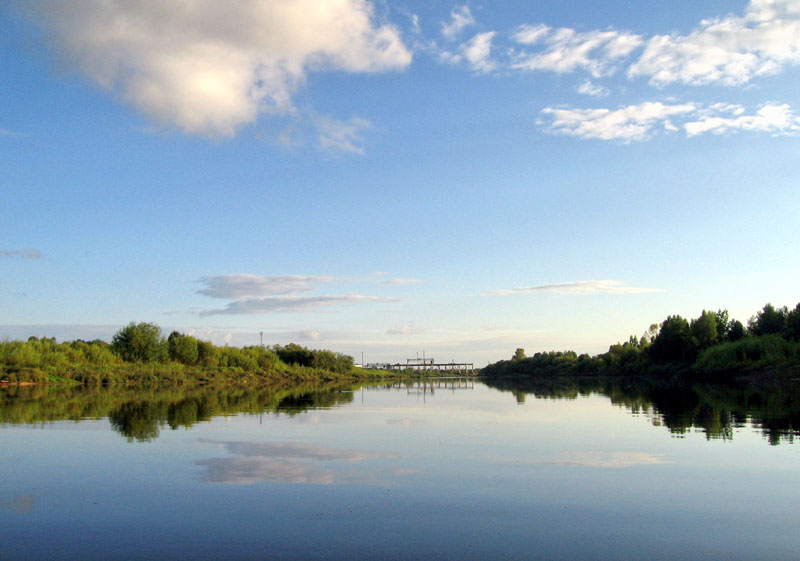
- Native name: Ветлуга (Russian)

Location
- Country: Russia

Physical characteristics
- Mouth: Volga
  - coordinates: 56°27′44″N 46°14′14″E
- Length: 889 km (552 mi)
- Basin size: 39,400 km^{2} (15,200 sq mi)
- Discharge
  - average: 255 m^{3}/s (9,000 cu ft/s)

Basin features
- Progression: Volga→ Caspian Sea

The Vetluga (Russian: Ветлу́га, IPA: [vʲɪtˈlugə]; Mari: Вӱтла, romanized: Vütla) is a river that flows through Kirov Oblast, Kostroma Oblast, Mari El and Nizhny Novgorod Oblast in Russia. It is a left tributary of the Volga. Their confluence is near Kozmodemyansk. The river is navigable. It is 889 kilometres (552 mi) long, and has a drainage basin of 39,400 square kilometres (15,200 sq mi). Its largest tributaries are Neya, Bolshaya Kaksha, Usta and Yuronga from the left and Vokhma and Lyunda from the right. The town Vetluga is situated on the river and named after it.
