= Urensky District =

Urensky District Уренский район (Russian)
- District
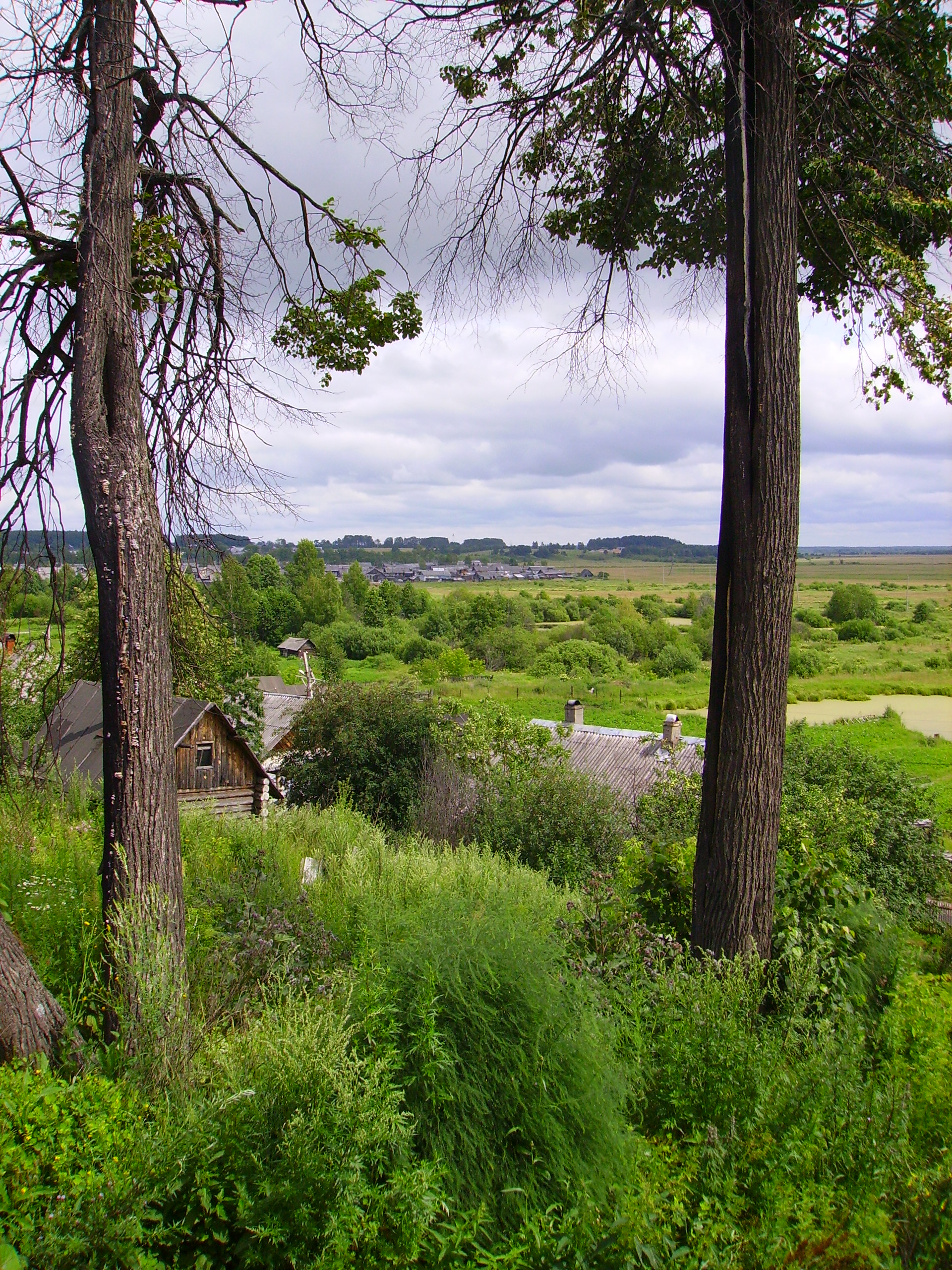
- Floodplain of the Usta River, Urensky District

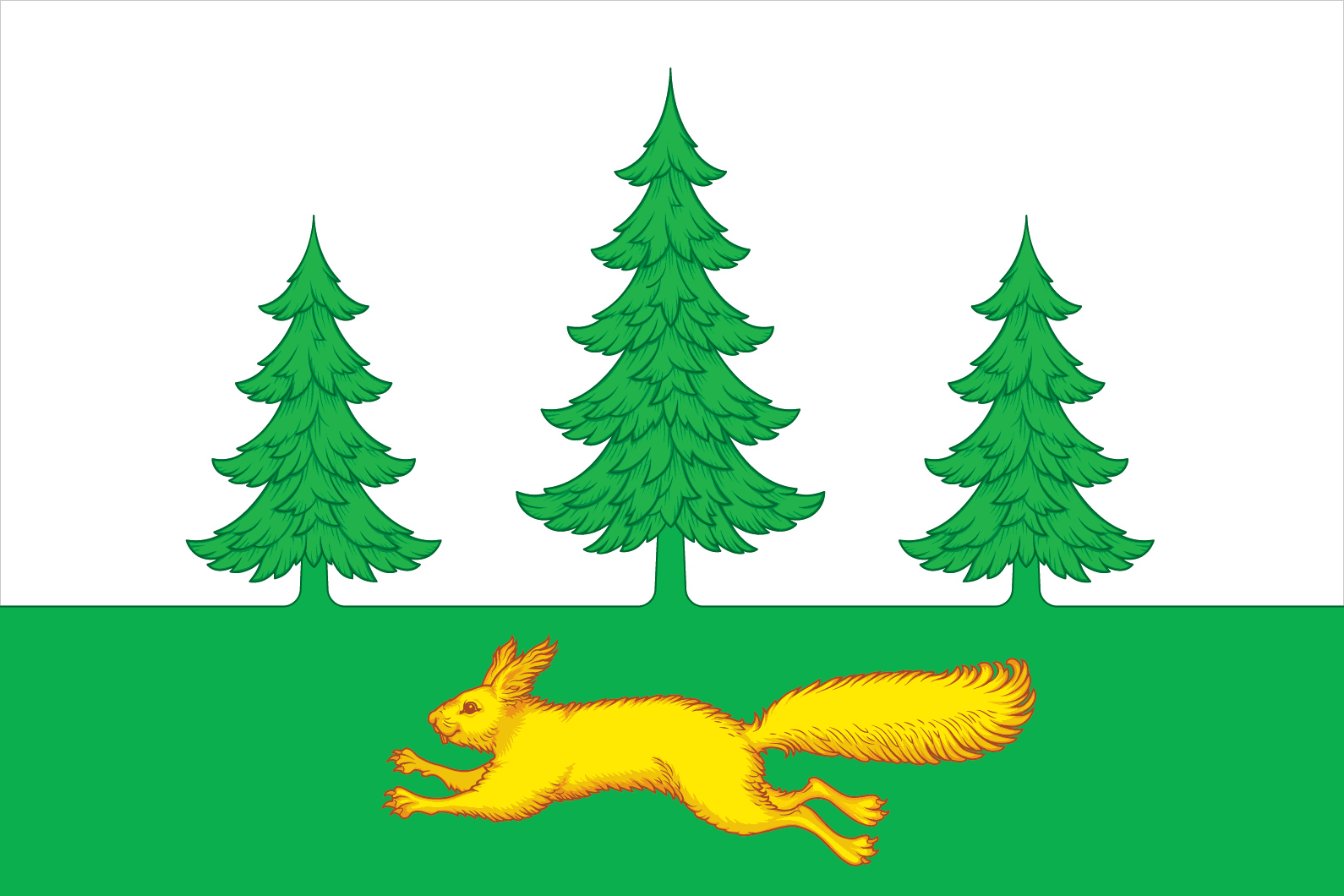
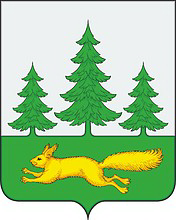
- Flag Coat of arms
- Location of Urensky District in Nizhny Novgorod Oblast
- Coordinates: 57°28′N 45°47′E
- Country: Russia
- Federal subject: Nizhny Novgorod Oblast
- Established: 1929
- Administrative center: Uren

Area
  - Total: 2,102.7 km^{2} (811.9 sq mi)

Population (2010 Census)
  - Total: 30,106
  - Density: 14.318/km^{2} (37.083/sq mi)
  - Urban: 57.5%
  - Rural: 42.5%

Administrative structure
  - Administrative divisions: 1 Towns of district significance, 1 Work settlements, 13 Selsoviets
  - Inhabited localities: 1 cities/towns, 1 urban-type settlements, 120 rural localities

Municipal structure
  - Municipally incorporated as: Urensky Municipal District
  - Municipal divisions: 2 urban settlements, 13 rural settlements
- Time zone: UTC+3 (MSK)
- OKTMO ID: 22654000
- Website: http://urenadm.nnov.ru

Urensky District (Russian: Уре́нский райо́н) is an administrative district (raion), one of the forty in Nizhny Novgorod Oblast, Russia. Municipally, it is incorporated as Urensky Municipal District. It is located in the north of the oblast. The area of the district is 2,102.7 square kilometers (811.9 sq mi). Its administrative center is the town of Uren. Population: 30,106 (2010 Census); 32,045 (2002 census); 36,847 (1989 Soviet census). The population of Uren accounts for 40.9% of the district's total population.

== History ==
The district was established in 1929.
