= Sosnovka, Mishkinsky District, Republic of Bashkortostan =

Village in Mishkinsky District, Bashkortostan, Russia

Sosnovka Сосновка
- Village
- Location within Bashkortostan Location within Russia
- Coordinates: 55°33′N 55°35′E
- Country: Russia
- Region: Bashkortostan
- District: Mishkinsky District
- Time zone: UTC+5:00

Sosnovka (Russian: Сосновка; Bashkir: Нарат, Narat; Meadow Mari: Пӱнчер, Pünčer) is a rural locality (a village) in Bolshesukhoyazovsky Selsoviet, Mishkinsky District, Bashkortostan, Russia. The population was 615 as of 2010. There are 17 streets.

== Geography ==
Sosnovka is located 36 km west of Mishkino (the district's administrative centre) by road. Kurmanayevo is the nearest rural locality.
