= Sosnovka, Zilairsky District, Republic of Bashkortostan =

Sosnovka Сосновка
- Village
- Location within Bashkortostan Location within Russia
- Coordinates: 52°12′N 57°16′E
- Country: Russia
- Region: Bashkortostan
- District: Zilairsky District
- Time zone: UTC+5:00

Sosnovka (Russian: Сосновка) is a rural locality (a village) in Berdyashsky Selsoviet, Zilairsky District, Bashkortostan, Russia. The population was 17 as of 2010. There is 1 street.

== Geography ==
Sosnovka is located 13 km west of Zilair (the district's administrative centre) by road. Berdyash is the nearest rural locality.
