= GAZ-5903V Vetluga =

Russian heavy firefighting vehicle

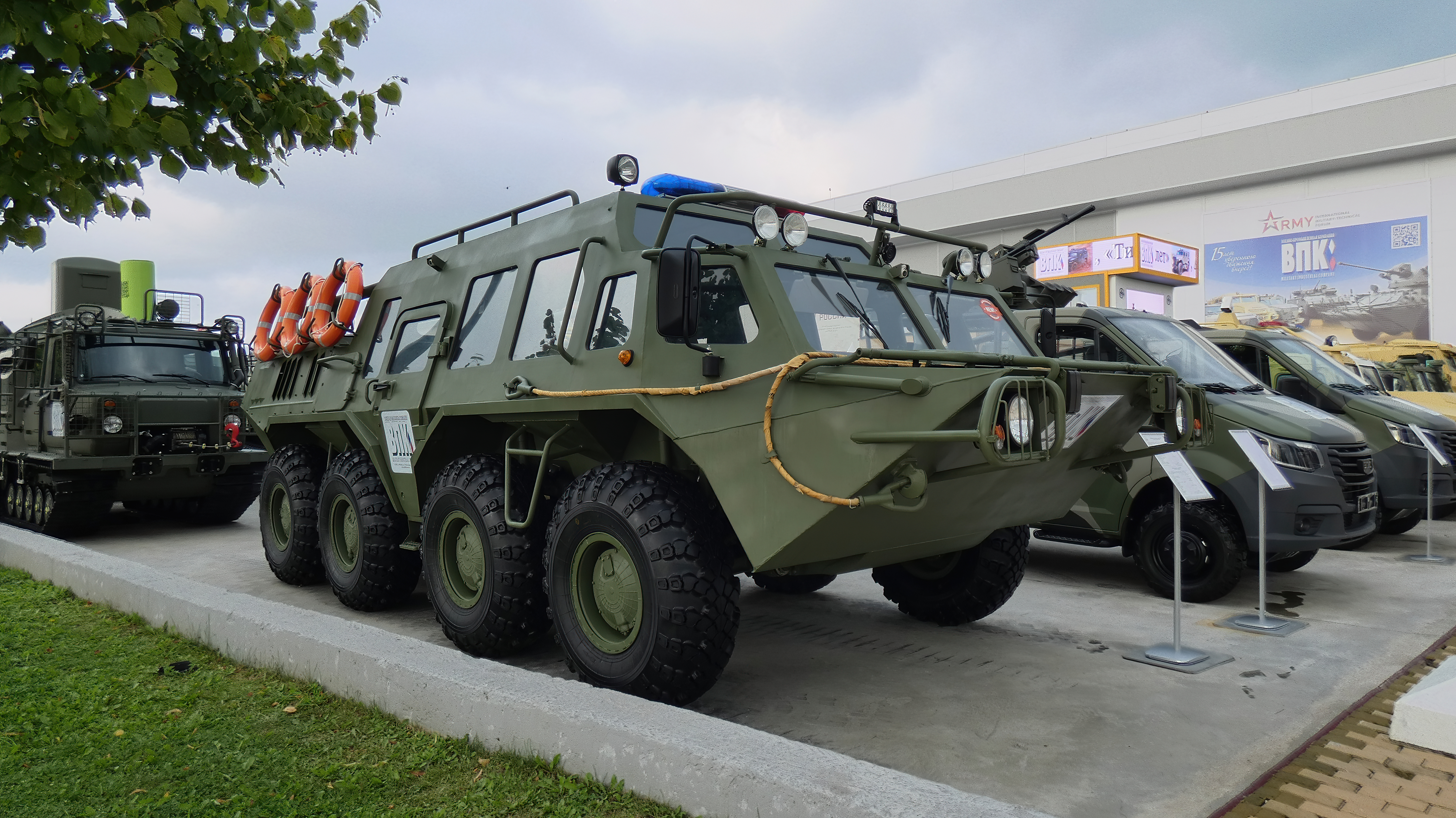
GAZ-59037

The GAZ-5903V Vetluga is a Russian heavy firefighting vehicle produced by GAZ Group, a modified BTR-70 amphibious armored personnel carrier with an externally mounted fire suppression system in a large vertically movable turret. The turret mounts 11 large tubes filled with powdered firefighting chemicals. It is derived from the GAZ-59037. Its purpose is to be able to put out large, high-risk industrial fires, and resolve a variety of other situations involving grave risk of explosion. The crew has a communications system, and filtered ventilation. Extra tools and equipment are also carried.

The vehicle carries enough preloaded extinguishing powder to fire each of the 11 tubes twice, and enough reloads, carried in separate cases, to be able to fire each tube twice again. The powder is expelled by controlled air blasts, which is why the method is called pulsed throwing, or impulse firefighting.

== Known Specifications ==
- Weight (unloaded): 13,000 kilograms
- Cargo allowance: 5,000 kilograms
- Engine: KamAZ-7403 diesel engine, typical output 191 kilowatts, maximum output 260 kilowatts
- Length: 7.6 meters
- Width: 2.9 meters
- Height: ??
- Length of track assembly 2.41 meters
- Road speed: 80 kilometers per hour
- Water speed: 9 kilometers per hour
- Range: 600 kilometers
- Crew: 2
- Drive mechanism: 8×8
- Turret elevation: -2° to +25° vertical
- Turret firing range: 50–300 meters
- Manufacturing facility: Arzamas mechanical plant

== Sources ==
- http://www.arms-expo.ru/site.xp/057052.html%5B%5D
- http://autoussr.ru/zavod6.php
- http://www.rusarm.ru/products/dual/g59037.html%5B%5D
- http://legion.wplus.net/index.html?/guide/army/tr/gaz.html%5B%5D
- https://web.archive.org/web/20010426074310/http://www.amz.nnov.ru:8001/index_en.html
- https://web.archive.org/web/20070928093103/http://www.amphibiousvehicle.net/amphi/F_G.html
- https://forum.valka.cz/viewtopic.php/t/41355
- http://autowp.ru/picture/92494
