= Usta (Russia) =

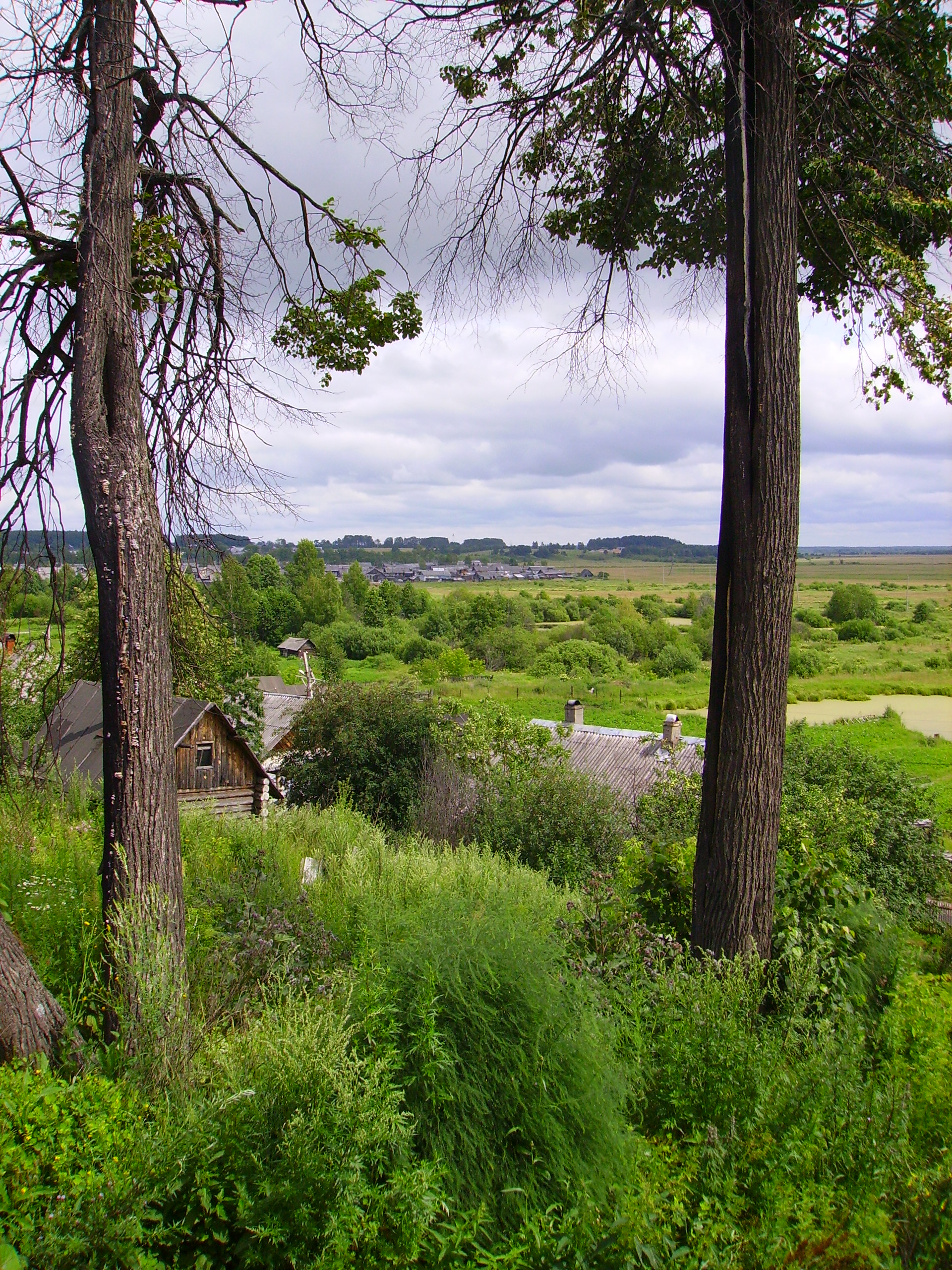
- Native name: Уста (Russian)

Location
- Country: Russia

Physical characteristics
- Mouth: Vetluga
  - coordinates: 56°54′40″N 45°27′40″E
- Length: 253 km (157 mi)
- Basin size: 6,030 km^{2} (2,330 sq mi)

Basin features
- Progression: Vetluga→ Volga→ Caspian Sea

The Usta (Russian: Уста) is a river in Nizhny Novgorod and Kirov Oblasts, Russia. It is a left tributary of the Vetluga (Volga's tributary). It is 253 kilometers (157 mi) in length, with a drainage basin of 6,030 square kilometers (2,330 sq mi). Most of its water comes from melting snow. The average discharge 47 kilometers (29 mi) from its mouth is 28 cubic meters per second (990 cu ft/s). The Usta freezes over in November, and stays icebound until April. It is navigable in its lower reaches. The town of Uren is located on the right bank of the Usta.
