= Sosnovka, Baymaksky District, Republic of Bashkortostan =

Sosnovka Сосновка
- Village
- Location within Bashkortostan Location within Russia
- Coordinates: 52°27′N 58°42′E
- Country: Russia
- Region: Bashkortostan
- District: Baymaksky District
- Time zone: UTC+5:00

Sosnovka (Russian: Сосновка) is a rural locality (a village) in Zilairsky Selsoviet, Baymaksky District, Bashkortostan, Russia. The population was 407 as of 2010. There are 7 streets.

== Geography ==
Sosnovka is located 61 km southeast of Baymak (the district's administrative centre) by road. Baishevo is the nearest rural locality.
