= Sosnovka, Kosinsky District, Perm Krai =

Sosnovka Сосновка
- Settlement
- Location within Perm Krai Location within Russia
- Coordinates: 59°58′N 54°45′E
- Country: Russia
- Region: Perm Krai
- District: Kosinsky District
- Time zone: UTC+5:00

Sosnovka (Russian: Сосновка) is a rural locality (a settlement) in Chazyovskoye Rural Settlement, Kosinsky District, Perm Krai, Russia. The population was 182 as of 2010. There are 5 streets.

== Geography ==
Sosnovka is located 20 km west of Kosa (the district's administrative centre) by road. Verkh-Lel is the nearest rural locality.
