= Sosnovka, Asovskoye Rural Settlement =

Sosnovka Сосновка
- Village
- Location within Perm Krai Location within Russia
- Coordinates: 57°26′N 57°37′E
- Country: Russia
- Region: Perm Krai
- District: Beryozovsky District
- Time zone: UTC+5:00

Sosnovka (Russian: Сосновка) is a rural locality (a village) in Asovskoye Rural Settlement, Beryozovsky District, Perm Krai, Russia. The population was 23 as of 2010.

== Geography ==
It is located on the Sosnovka River.
