= Sosnovka, Vologodsky District, Vologda Oblast =

Sosnovka Сосновка
- Settlement
- Location within Vologda Oblast Location within Russia
- Coordinates: 59°11′N 39°34′E
- Country: Russia
- Region: Vologda Oblast
- District: Vologodsky District
- Time zone: UTC+3:00

Sosnovka (Russian: Сосновка) is a rural locality (a settlement) and the administrative center of Sosnovskoye Rural Settlement, Vologodsky District, Vologda Oblast, Russia. The population was 2,311 as of 2002. There are 33 streets.

== Geography ==
Sosnovka is located 20 km southwest of Vologda (the district's administrative centre) by road. Isakovo is the nearest rural locality.
