= Sosnovka, Bizhbulyaksky District, Republic of Bashkortostan =

Sosnovka Сосновка
- Village
- Location within Bashkortostan Location within Russia
- Coordinates: 53°55′N 54°18′E
- Country: Russia
- Region: Bashkortostan
- District: Bizhbulyaksky District
- Time zone: UTC+5:00

Sosnovka (Russian: Сосновка) is a rural locality (a village) in Kosh-Yelginsky Selsoviet, Bizhbulyaksky District, Bashkortostan, Russia. The population was 44 as of 2010. There is 1 street.

== Geography ==
Sosnovka is located 49 km north of Bizhbulyak (the district's administrative centre) by road. Vishnevka is the nearest rural locality.
