= Kurmanayevo, Mishkinsky District, Republic of Bashkortostan =

Village in Mishkinsky District, Bashkortostan, Russia

Kurmanayevo Курманаево
- Village
- Location within Bashkortostan Location within Russia
- Coordinates: 55°34′N 55°33′E
- Country: Russia
- Region: Bashkortostan
- District: Mishkinsky District
- Time zone: UTC+5:00

Kurmanayevo (Russian: Курманаево; Bashkir: Ҡорманай, Qormanay; Meadow Mari: Тӧргымтӱр, Törgymtür) is a rural locality (a village) in Bolshesukhoyazovsky Selsoviet, Mishkinsky District, Bashkortostan, Russia. The population was 428 as of 2010. There are 14 streets.

== Geography ==
Kurmanayevo is located 39 km northwest of Mishkino (the district's administrative centre) by road. Bolshesukhoyazovo is the nearest rural locality.
