= Vetluga =

Town in Nizhny Novgorod Oblast, Russia

Vetluga Ветлуга
- Town
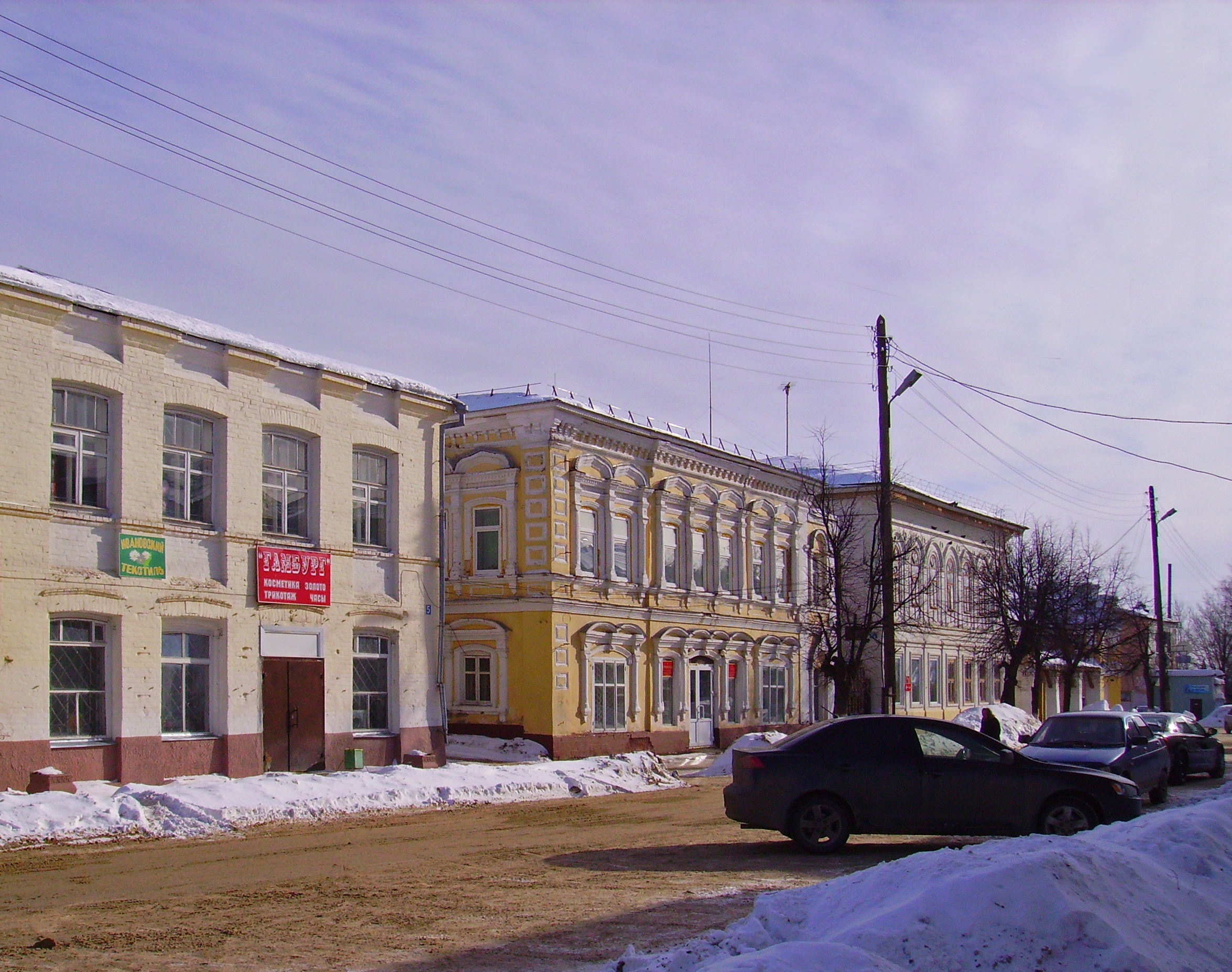
- Lenina Street in Vetluga

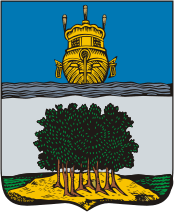
- Coat of arms
- Interactive map of Vetluga
- Location of Vetluga Vetluga (Nizhny Novgorod Oblast)
- Coordinates: 57°51′N 45°47′E
- Country: Russia
- Federal subject: Nizhny Novgorod Oblast
- Administrative district: Vetluzhsky District
- Town of district significanceSelsoviet: Vetluga
- Founded: 1636
- Town status since: 1778
- Elevation: 110 m (360 ft)

Population (2010 Census)
  - Total: 8,954
  - Estimate (2021): 7,681 (−14.2%)

Administrative status
  - Capital of: Vetluzhsky District, town of district significance of Vetluga

Municipal status
  - Municipal district: Vetluzhsky Municipal District
  - Urban settlement: Vetluga Urban Settlement
  - Capital of: Vetluzhsky Municipal District, Vetluga Urban Settlement
- Time zone: UTC+3 (MSK)
- Postal code: 606860
- OKTMO ID: 22618101001

Vetluga (Russian: Ветлу́га) is a town and the administrative center of Vetluzhsky District in Nizhny Novgorod Oblast, Russia, located on the right bank of the Vetluga River, after which the town is named. Population: 8,954 (2010 census); 9,641 (2002 census); 10,190 (1989 Soviet census).

== History ==
It was founded in 1636 and granted town status in 1778.

== Administrative and municipal status ==
Within the framework of administrative divisions, Vetluga serves as the administrative center of Vetluzhsky District. As an administrative division, it is incorporated within Vetluzhsky District as the town of district significance of Vetluga. As a municipal division, the town of district significance of Vetluga is incorporated within Vetluzhsky Municipal District as Vetluga Urban Settlement.

== Notable people ==
- Aleksey Pisemsky (1821–1881), novelist and dramatist, lived his first ten years in Vetluga
- Vasily Rozanov (1856–1919), writer and philosopher, born in Vetluga
- Viktor Rozov (1913–2004), dramatist and screenwriter, received primary education at Vetluga from 1918

== Climate ==
Climate data for Vetluga (extremes 1940-present)
Month	Jan	Feb	Mar	Apr	May	Jun	Jul	Aug	Sep	Oct	Nov	Dec	Year
Record high °C (°F)	4.7 (40.5)	7.0 (44.6)	16.7 (62.1)	26.7 (80.1)	33.2 (91.8)	35.5 (95.9)	37.1 (98.8)	36.2 (97.2)	30.7 (87.3)	23.1 (73.6)	12.7 (54.9)	8.0 (46.4)	37.1 (98.8)
Mean daily maximum °C (°F)	−7.1 (19.2)	−5.4 (22.3)	1.5 (34.7)	10.4 (50.7)	18.8 (65.8)	22.6 (72.7)	24.8 (76.6)	22.0 (71.6)	15.8 (60.4)	7.3 (45.1)	−0.7 (30.7)	−5.4 (22.3)	8.7 (47.7)
Daily mean °C (°F)	−10.4 (13.3)	−9.4 (15.1)	−3.2 (26.2)	4.7 (40.5)	12.1 (53.8)	16.4 (61.5)	18.8 (65.8)	16.0 (60.8)	10.5 (50.9)	3.7 (38.7)	−3.2 (26.2)	−8.2 (17.2)	4.0 (39.2)
Mean daily minimum °C (°F)	−13.4 (7.9)	−12.9 (8.8)	−7.3 (18.9)	−0.2 (31.6)	6.1 (43.0)	10.7 (51.3)	13.3 (55.9)	11.2 (52.2)	6.5 (43.7)	1.1 (34.0)	−5.3 (22.5)	−10.9 (12.4)	−0.1 (31.9)
Record low °C (°F)	−43.6 (−46.5)	−39.3 (−38.7)	−34.9 (−30.8)	−22.3 (−8.1)	−6.5 (20.3)	−2.6 (27.3)	2.1 (35.8)	−1.4 (29.5)	−7.3 (18.9)	−18.4 (−1.1)	−35.9 (−32.6)	−47.7 (−53.9)	−47.7 (−53.9)
Average precipitation mm (inches)	49.7 (1.96)	37.4 (1.47)	38.4 (1.51)	37.3 (1.47)	49.9 (1.96)	78.2 (3.08)	88.4 (3.48)	71.2 (2.80)	54.8 (2.16)	68.8 (2.71)	55.6 (2.19)	57.2 (2.25)	686.9 (27.04)
Source: pogoda.ru.net
