= Sosnovka, Aurgazinsky District, Republic of Bashkortostan =

Sosnovka Сосновка
- Village
- Location within Bashkortostan Location within Russia
- Coordinates: 53°48′N 55°50′E
- Country: Russia
- Region: Bashkortostan
- District: Aurgazinsky District

Population (2010)
  - Total: 58
- Time zone: UTC+5:00

Sosnovka (Russian: Сосновка) is a rural locality (a village) in Meselinsky Selsoviet, Aurgazinsky District, Bashkortostan, Russia. The population was 58 as of 2010. There is 1 street.

== Geography ==
Sosnovka is located 32 km south of Tolbazy (the district's administrative centre) by road. Dadanovka is the nearest rural locality.
