= Sosnovka, Vyaznikovsky District, Vladimir Oblast =

Sosnovka Сосновка
- Village

- Location within Vladimir Oblast Location within Russia
- Coordinates: 56°11′N 41°44′E
- Country: Russia
- Region: Vladimir Oblast
- District: Vyaznikovsky District
- Time zone: UTC+3:00

Sosnovka (Russian: Сосновка) is a rural locality (a village) in Styopantsevskoye Rural Settlement, Vyaznikovsky District, Vladimir Oblast, Russia. The population was 3 as of 2010.

== Geography ==
Sosnovka is located 30 km west of Vyazniki (the district's administrative centre) by road. Ryabikha is the nearest rural locality.
