= Sosnovka, Zarinsky District, Altai Krai =

Sosnovka Сосновка
- Selo
- Location within Altai Krai Location within Russia
- Coordinates: 53°52′N 85°22′E
- Country: Russia
- Region: Altai Krai
- District: Zarinsky District
- Time zone: UTC+7:00

Sosnovka (Russian: Сосновка) is a rural locality (a selo) in Sosnovsky Selsoviet, Zarinsky District, Altai Krai, Russia. The population was 441 as of 2013. There are 6 streets.

== Geography ==
Sosnovka is located 48 km northeast of Zarinsk (the district's administrative centre) by road. Malinovka is the nearest rural locality.
