= Sosnovka, Republic of Buryatia =

Selo in the Republic of Buryatia, Russia

Sosnovka Сосновка
- Selo
- Location within Republic of Buryatia Location within Russia
- Coordinates: 50°52′N 106°00′E
- Country: Russia
- Region: Republic of Buryatia
- District: Selenginsky District
- Time zone: UTC+8:00

Sosnovka (Russian: Сосновка) is a rural locality (a selo) in Selenginsky District, Republic of Buryatia, Russia. The population was 26 as of 2010. There is 1 street.

== Geography ==
Sosnovka is located 68 km southwest of Gusinoozyorsk (the district's administrative centre) by road. Shana is the nearest rural locality.
