= Mesyagutovo, Yanaulsky District, Republic of Bashkortostan =

Mesyagutovo Месягутово
- Selo
- Location within Bashkortostan Location within Russia
- Coordinates: 56°05′N 55°20′E
- Country: Russia
- Region: Bashkortostan
- District: Yanaulsky District
- Time zone: UTC+5:00

Mesyagutovo (Russian: Месягутово; Bashkir: Мәсәғүт, Mäsäğüt) is a rural locality (a selo) and the administrative centre of Mesyagutovsky Selsoviet, Yanaulsky District, Bashkortostan, Russia. The population was 177 as of 2010. There are 3 streets.

== Geography ==
Mesyagutovo is located 42 km southeast of Yanaul (the district's administrative centre) by road. Stary Aldar is the nearest rural locality.
