= Sosnovka, Tyumentsevsky District, Altai Krai =

Sosnovka Сосновка
- Settlement
- Location within Altai Krai Location within Russia
- Coordinates: 53°15′N 81°50′E
- Country: Russia
- Region: Altai Krai
- District: Tyumentsevsky District
- Time zone: UTC+7:00

Sosnovka (Russian: Сосновка) is a rural locality (a settlement) in Beryozovsky Selsoviet, Tyumentsevsky District, Altai Krai, Russia. The population was 330 as of 2013. There are 3 streets.

== Geography ==
Sosnovka is located 31 km southeast of Tyumentsevo (the district's administrative centre) by road. Beryozovka is the nearest rural locality.
