= Sosnovka, Kotovsky District, Volgograd Oblast =

Sosnovka Сосновка
- Selo
- Location within Volgograd Oblast Location within Russia
- Coordinates: 50°37′N 44°32′E
- Country: Russia
- Region: Volgograd Oblast
- District: Kotovsky District
- Time zone: UTC+4:00

Sosnovka (Russian: Сосновка) is a rural locality (a selo) in Burlukskoye Rural Settlement, Kotovsky District, Volgograd Oblast, Russia. The population was 163 as of 2010. There are 8 streets.

== Geography ==
The village is located in steppe, in the valley of the Medveditsa River, 290 km from Volgograd, 63 km from Kotovo.
