= Sosnovka, Beloretsky District, Republic of Bashkortostan =

Rural locality in Bashkortostan, Russia

Sosnovka Сосновка
- Selo
- Location within Bashkortostan Location within Russia
- Coordinates: 53°51′N 58°17′E
- Country: Russia
- Region: Bashkortostan
- District: Beloretsky District
- Time zone: UTC+5:00

Sosnovka (Russian: Сосновка) is a rural locality (a selo) and the administrative centre of Sosnovsky Selsoviet, Beloretsky District, Bashkortostan, Russia. The population was 723 as of 2010. There are 18 streets.

== Geography ==
Sosnovka is located 19 km southwest of Beloretsk (the district's administrative centre) by road. Arsky Kamen is the nearest rural locality.
