= Vetluzhsky District =

Vetluzhsky District Ветлужский район (Russian)
- District
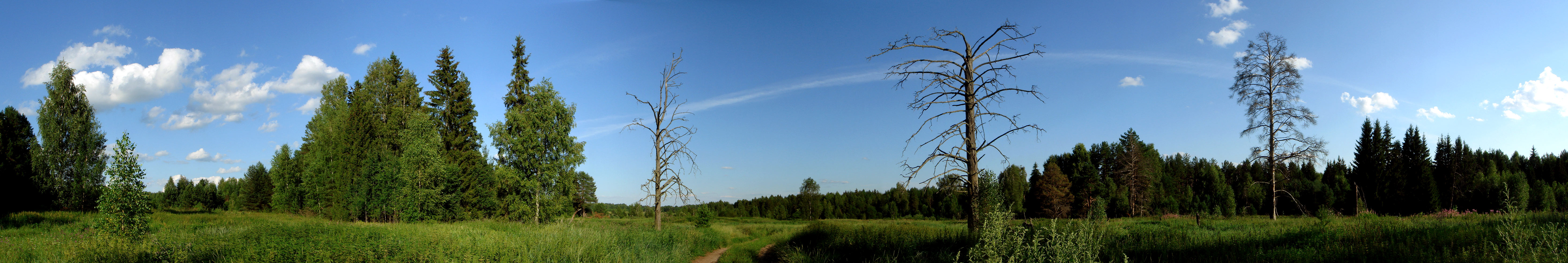
- A wooded area in Vetluzhsky District

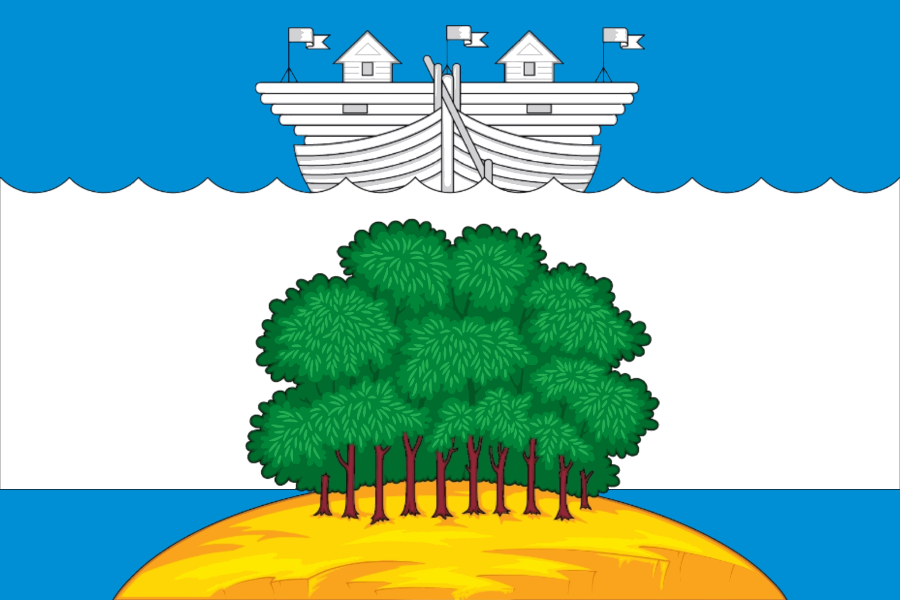
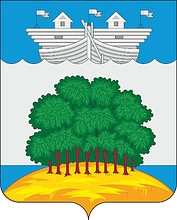
- Flag Coat of arms
- Location of Vetluzhsky District in Nizhny Novgorod Oblast
- Coordinates: 57°51′20″N 45°46′52″E
- Country: Russia
- Federal subject: Nizhny Novgorod Oblast
- Established: 1929
- Administrative center: Vetluga

Area
  - Total: 2,992.4 km^{2} (1,155.4 sq mi)

Population (2010 Census)
  - Total: 16,330
  - Density: 5.457/km^{2} (14.13/sq mi)
  - Urban: 69.1%
  - Rural: 30.9%

Administrative structure
  - Administrative divisions: 1 Towns of district significance, 1 Work settlements, 7 Selsoviets
  - Inhabited localities: 1 cities/towns, 1 urban-type settlements, 136 rural localities

Municipal structure
  - Municipally incorporated as: Vetluzhsky Municipal District
  - Municipal divisions: 2 urban settlements, 7 rural settlements
- Time zone: UTC+3 (MSK)
- OKTMO ID: 22518000
- Website: https://vetluga.nobl.ru/

Vetluzhsky District (Russian: Ветлу́жский райо́н) is an administrative district (raion), one of the forty in Nizhny Novgorod Oblast, Russia. Municipally, it is incorporated as Vetluzhsky Municipal District. It is located in the north of the oblast. The area of the district is 2,992.4 square kilometers (1,155.4 sq mi). Its administrative center is the town of Vetluga. Population: 16,330 (2010 Census); 18,902 (2002 census); 22,559 (1989 Soviet census). The population of Vetluga accounts for 54.8% of the district's total population.

== History ==
The district was established in 1929.

== Notable residents ==
- Mikhail Artemyevich Muravyov (1880–1918), military officer, born in the village of Burdukovo, near Vetluga
- Aleksey Pisemsky (1821–1881), novelist and dramatist, lived his first ten years at Vetluga
- Vasily Rozanov (1856–1919), writer and philosopher, born in Vetluga
- Viktor Rozov (1913–2004), dramatist and screenwriter, received primary education at Vetluga from 1918
