= Sosnovka, Belokataysky District, Republic of Bashkortostan =

Sosnovka Сосновка
- Village
- Location within Bashkortostan Location within Russia
- Coordinates: 55°33′N 59°01′E
- Country: Russia
- Region: Bashkortostan
- District: Belokataysky District
- Time zone: UTC+5:00

Sosnovka (Russian: Сосновка) is a rural locality (a village) in Atarshinsky Selsoviet, Belokataysky District, Bashkortostan, Russia. The population was 25 as of 2010. There are 2 streets.

== Geography ==
Sosnovka is located 21 km south of Novobelokatay (the district's administrative centre) by road. Atarsha is the nearest rural locality.
