= Sosnovka, Voronezh Oblast =

Sosnovka Сосновка
- Settlement
- Location within Voronezh Oblast Location within Russia
- Coordinates: 51°49′N 40°52′E
- Country: Russia
- Region: Voronezh Oblast
- District: Ertilsky District
- Time zone: UTC+3:00

Sosnovka (Russian: Сосновка) is a rural locality (a settlement) in Ertil, Ertilsky District, Voronezh Oblast, Russia. The population was 145 as of 2010. There are 2 streets.

== Geography ==
Sosnovka is located 7 km southeast of Ertil (the district's administrative centre) by road. Ertil is the nearest rural locality.
