= Sosnovka, Cherepovetsky District, Vologda Oblast =

Sosnovka Сосновка
- Village
- Location within Vologda Oblast Location within Russia
- Coordinates: 58°57′N 37°29′E
- Country: Russia
- Region: Vologda Oblast
- District: Cherepovetsky District
- Time zone: UTC+3:00

Sosnovka (Russian: Сосновка) is a rural locality (a village) in Korotovskoye Rural Settlement, Cherepovetsky District, Vologda Oblast, Russia. The population was 278 as of 2002. There are 14 streets.

== Geography ==
Sosnovka is located 64 km southwest of Cherepovets (the district's administrative centre) by road. Korotovo is the nearest rural locality.
