= Uren, Russia =

Town in Nizhny Novgorod Oblast, Russia

Uren Урень
- Town
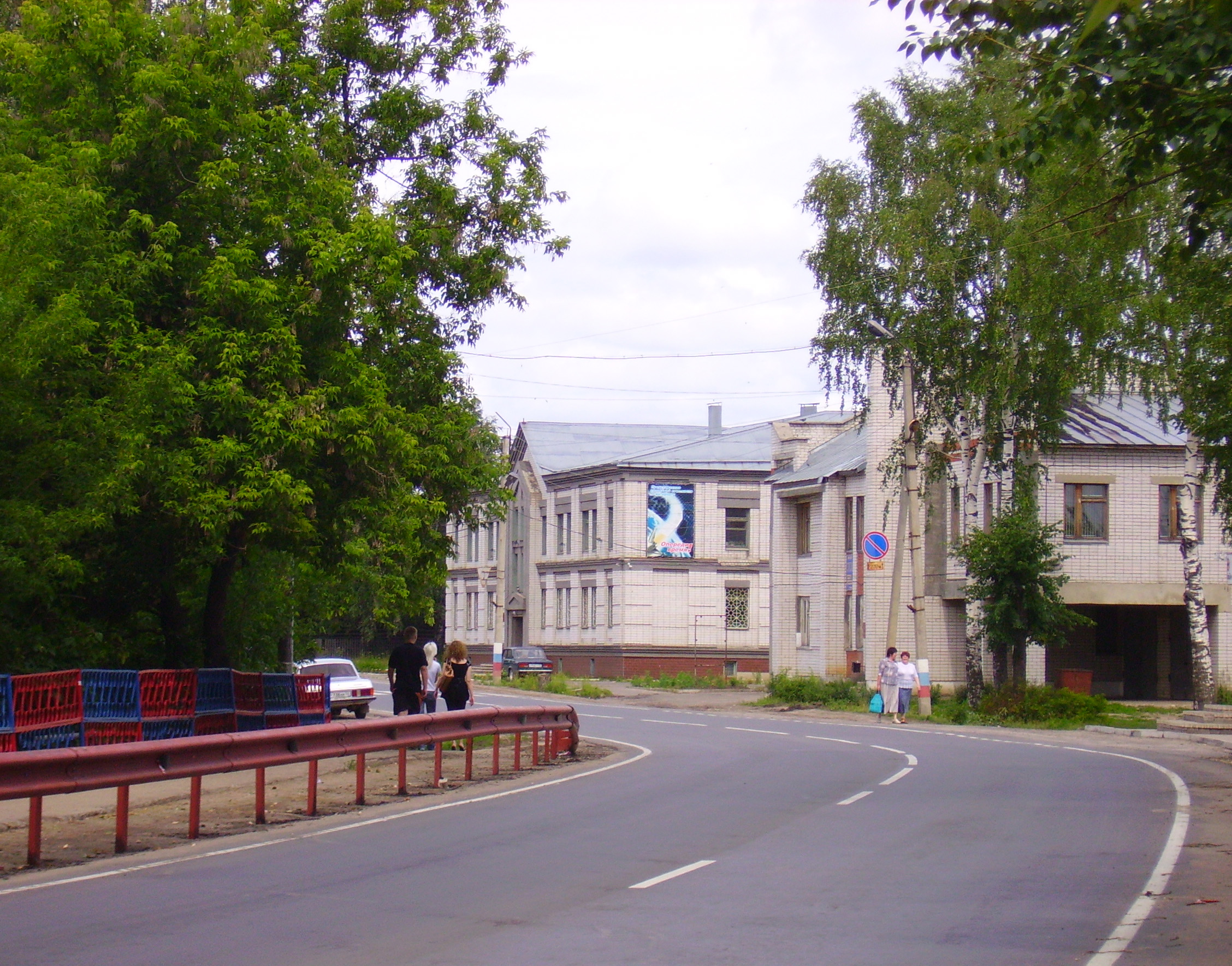
- Lenina Street in Uren

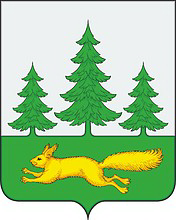
- Coat of arms
- Interactive map of Uren
- Location of Uren Uren (Nizhny Novgorod Oblast)
- Coordinates: 57°27′N 45°47′E
- Country: Russia
- Federal subject: Nizhny Novgorod Oblast
- Administrative district: Urensky District
- Town of district significanceSelsoviet: Uren
- First mentioned: 1719
- Town status since: 1973
- Elevation: 100 m (330 ft)

Population (2010 Census)
  - Total: 12,304
  - Estimate (2021): 12,450 (+1.2%)

Administrative status
  - Capital of: Urensky District, town of district significance of Uren

Municipal status
  - Municipal district: Urensky Municipal District
  - Urban settlement: Uren Urban Settlement
  - Capital of: Uren Municipal District, Uren Urban Settlement
- Time zone: UTC+3 (MSK)
- Postal codes: 606800, 606803
- OKTMO ID: 22654101001

Uren (Russian: Уре́нь) is a town and the administrative center of Urensky District in Nizhny Novgorod Oblast, Russia, located on the right bank of the Usta River (Volga's basin), 183 kilometers (114 mi) northeast of Nizhny Novgorod, the administrative center of the oblast. It has population: 12,304 (2010 census); 12,558 (2002 census); 13,560 (1989 Soviet census).

== History ==
It was first mentioned in 1719. It was granted urban-type settlement status in 1959 and town status in 1973.

== Administrative and municipal status ==
Within the framework of administrative divisions, Uren serves as the administrative center of Urensky District. As an administrative division, it is, together with two rural localities, incorporated within Urensky District as the town of district significance of Uren. As a municipal division, the town of district significance of Uren is incorporated within Urensky Municipal District as Uren Urban Settlement.

== Transportation ==
There is a railway station in the town, through which the trans-Siberian railroad passes. The town also lies on Road R159.
