= Sosnovka, Kameshkovsky District, Vladimir Oblast =

Sosnovka Сосновка
- Village
- Location within Vladimir Oblast Location within Russia
- Coordinates: 56°24′N 41°08′E
- Country: Russia
- Region: Vladimir Oblast
- District: Kameshkovsky District
- Time zone: UTC+3:00

Sosnovka (Russian: Сосновка) is a rural locality (a village) in Bryzgalovskoye Rural Settlement, Kameshkovsky District, Vladimir Oblast, Russia. The population was 63 as of 2010. There is 1 street.

== Geography ==
Sosnovka is located 15 km northeast of Kameshkovo (the district's administrative centre) by road. Malygino is the nearest rural locality.
