= Sosnovka, Pervomaysky District, Altai Krai =

Sosnovka Сосновка
- Selo
- Location within Altai Krai Location within Russia
- Coordinates: 53°07′N 84°01′E
- Country: Russia
- Region: Altai Krai
- District: Pervomaysky District
- Time zone: UTC+7:00

Sosnovka (Russian: Сосновка) is a rural locality (a selo) in Bobrovsky Selsoviet, Pervomaysky District, Altai Krai, Russia. The population was 645 as of 2013. There is 1 street.

== Geography ==
Sosnovka is located 47 km south of Novoaltaysk (the district's administrative centre) by road. Bobrovka is the nearest rural locality.
