= Sosnovka, Amur Oblast =

Sosnovka Сосновка
- Selo
- Location within Amur Oblast Location within Russia
- Coordinates: 51°09′N 128°45′E
- Country: Russia
- Region: Amur Oblast
- District: Seryshevsky District
- Time zone: UTC+9:00

Sosnovka (Russian: Сосновка) is a rural locality (a selo) in Sosnovsky Selsoviet of Seryshevsky District, Amur Oblast, Russia. The population was 209 as of 2018. There are 15 streets.

== Geography ==
Sosnovka is located 33 km east of Seryshevo (the district's administrative centre) by road. Vernoye is the nearest rural locality.
