= Sosnovka, Kharovsky District, Vologda Oblast =

Sosnovka Сосновка
- Village
- Location within Vologda Oblast Location within Russia
- Coordinates: 59°53′N 39°56′E
- Country: Russia
- Region: Vologda Oblast
- District: Kharovsky District
- Time zone: UTC+3:00

Sosnovka (Russian: Сосновка) is a rural locality (a village) in Kharovskoye Rural Settlement, Kharovsky District, Vologda Oblast, Russia. The population was 3 as of 2002.

== Geography ==
Sosnovka is located 20 km (12 mi) southwest of Kharovsk (the district's administrative centre) by road. Pochinok is the nearest rural locality.
