= Sosnovka, Mechetlinsky District, Republic of Bashkortostan =

Sosnovka Сосновка
- Village
- Location within Bashkortostan Location within Russia
- Coordinates: 55°58′N 58°05′E
- Country: Russia
- Region: Bashkortostan
- District: Mechetlinsky District
- Time zone: UTC+5:00

Sosnovka (Russian: Сосновка) is a rural locality (a village) in Alegazovsky Selsoviet, Mechetlinsky District, Bashkortostan, Russia. The population was 22 as of 2010. There is 1 street.

== Geography ==
Sosnovka is located 20 km northwest of Bolsheustyikinskoye (the district's administrative centre) by road. Bolshekyzylbayevo is the nearest rural locality.
