= Sosnovka, Zabaykalsky Krai =

Sosnovka Сосновка
- Selo
- Location within Zabaykalsky Krai Location within Russia
- Coordinates: 51°25′N 110°18′E
- Country: Russia
- Region: Zabaykalsky Krai
- District: Khiloksky District
- Time zone: UTC+9:00

Sosnovka (Russian: Сосновка) is a rural locality (a selo) in Khiloksky District, Zabaykalsky Krai, Russia. Population: 16 (2021 census); 21 (2010 census);

== Geography ==
This rural locality is located 13 km from Khilok (the district's administrative centre), 231 km from Chita (capital of Zabaykalsky Krai) and 5,062 km from Moscow. Zhipkhegen is the nearest rural locality.
