= Sosnovka, Kaduysky District, Vologda Oblast =

Sosnovka Сосновка
- Settlement
- Location within Vologda Oblast Location within Russia
- Coordinates: 59°35′00″N 36°29′46″E
- Country: Russia
- Region: Vologda Oblast
- District: Kaduysky District
- Time zone: UTC+3:00

Sosnovka (Russian: Сосновка) is a rural locality (a settlement) in Semizerye Rural Settlement, Kaduysky District, Vologda Oblast, Russia. The population was 196 as of 2002. There are 3 streets.

== Geography ==
Sosnovka is located 70 km (43 mi) northwest of Kaduy (the district's administrative centre) by road. Shigodskiye is the nearest rural locality.
