= Sosnovka, Bakalinsky District, Republic of Bashkortostan =

Sosnovka Сосновка
- Village
- Location within Bashkortostan Location within Russia
- Coordinates: 55°09′N 53°49′E
- Country: Russia
- Region: Bashkortostan
- District: Bakalinsky District
- Time zone: UTC+5:00

Sosnovka (Russian: Сосновка) is a rural locality (a village) in Bakalinsky Selsoviet, Bakalinsky District, Bashkortostan, Russia. The population was 254 as of 2010. There is 1 street.

== Geography ==
Sosnovka is located 3 km southeast of Bakaly (the district's administrative centre) by road. Urman is the nearest rural locality.
