= Karagay, Perm Krai =

Karagay Карагай
- Selo
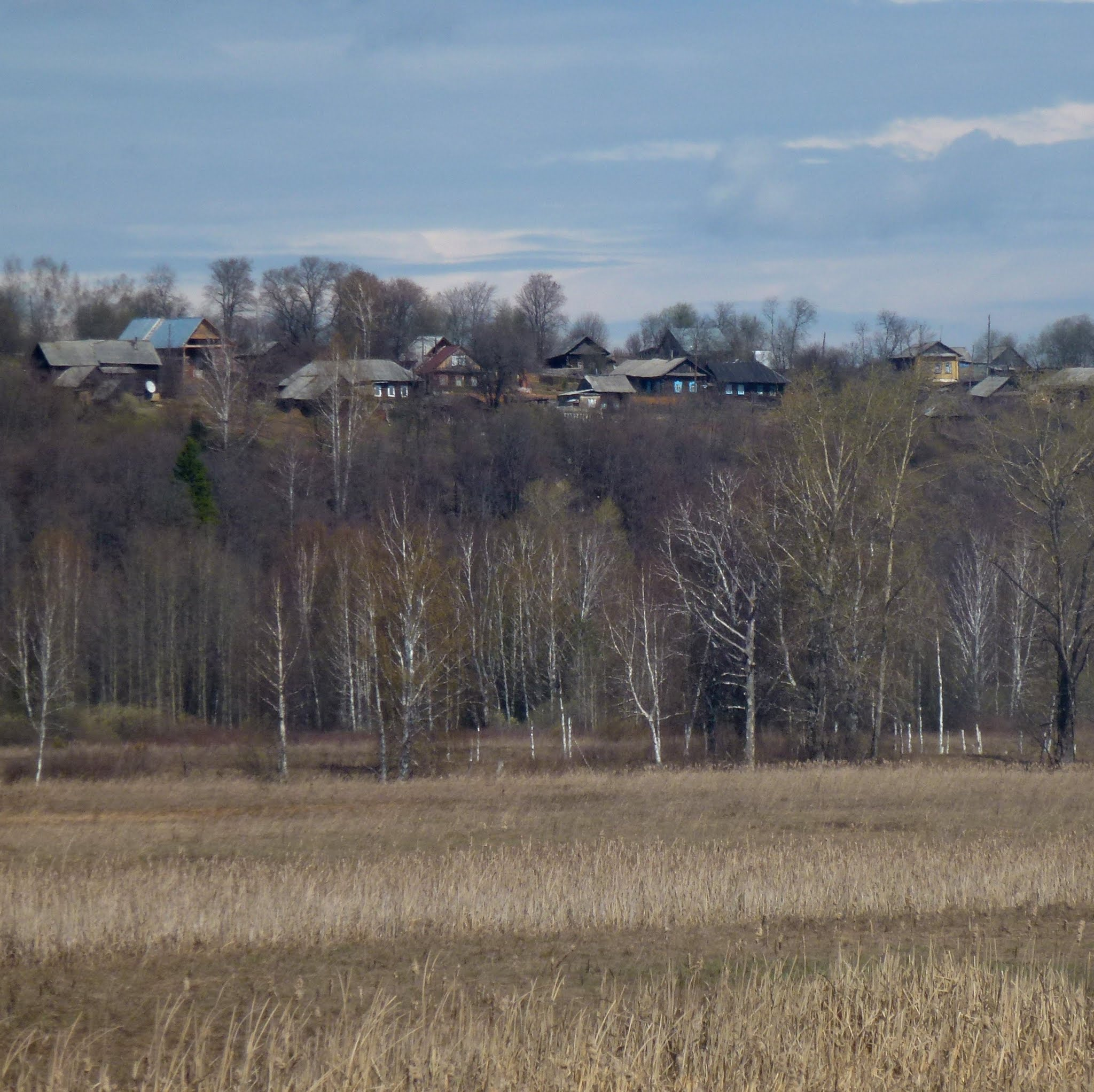

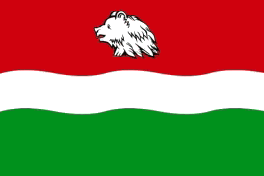
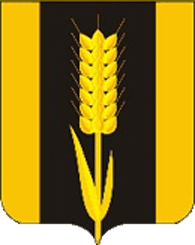
- Flag Coat of arms
- Interactive map of Karagay
- Location of Karagay Karagay (Perm Krai)
- Coordinates: 58°16′17″N 54°56′20″E
- Country: Russia
- Federal subject: Perm Krai
- Administrative district: Karagaysky District

Population (2010 Census)
  - Total: 6,682
  - Estimate (2021): 6,716 (+0.5%)

Administrative status
  - Capital of: Karagaysky District
- Time zone: UTC+5 (MSK+2)
- Postal code: 617210
- OKTMO ID: 57622410101

Karagay (Russian: Карагай) is a rural locality (a selo) and the administrative center of Karagaysky District of Perm Krai, Russia, located on the Obva River. Population: 6,682 (2010 census); 6,754 (2002 census); 6,339 (1989 Soviet census).

Its name is of the Turkic origin and translates from the Bashkir language as "pine" or "pine forest". It was first mentioned in 1623 as a village of six households. It serves as the administrative center of the district since 1923.
