= Karagaysky District =

Karagaysky District Карагайский район (Russian)
- District
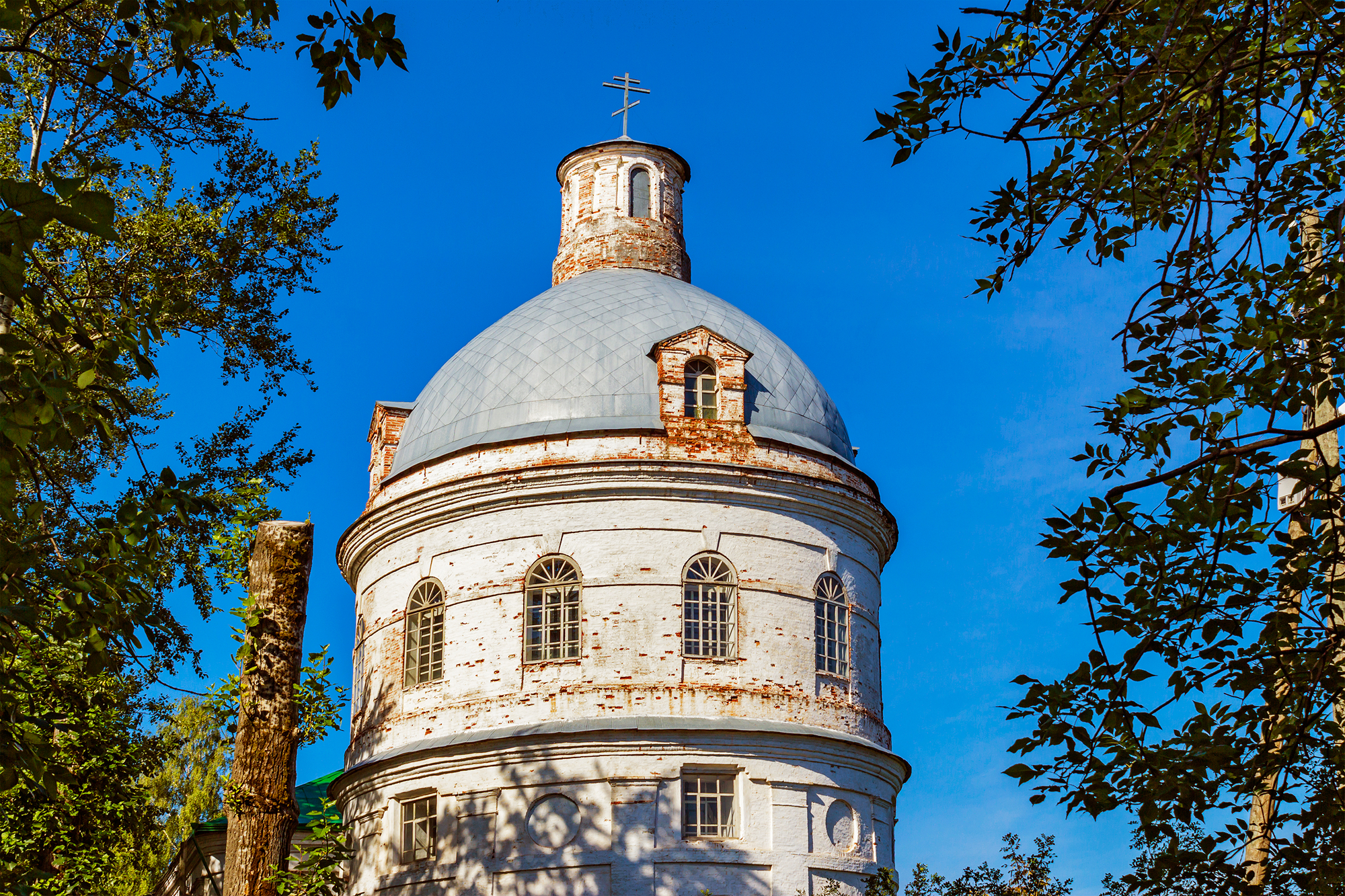
- Church in Karagai, Karagansky District

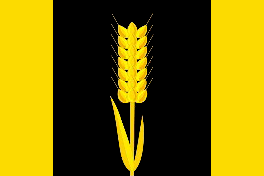
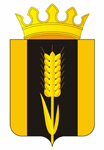
- Flag Coat of arms
- Location of Karagaysky District in Perm Krai
- Coordinates: 58.482°N 55.037°E
- Country: Russia
- Federal subject: Perm Krai
- Established: February 27, 1924
- Administrative center: Karagay

Area
  - Total: 2,394 km^{2} (924 sq mi)

Population (2010 Census)
  - Total: 22,875
  - Density: 9.555/km^{2} (24.75/sq mi)
  - Urban: 0%
  - Rural: 100%

Administrative structure
  - Inhabited localities: 173 rural localities

Municipal structure
  - Municipally incorporated as: Karagaysky Municipal District
  - Municipal divisions: 0 urban settlements, 7 rural settlements
- Time zone: UTC+5 (MSK+2)
- OKTMO ID: 57622000
- Website: http://www.karagai.ru/

Karagaysky District (Russian: Карага́йский райо́н) is an administrative district (raion) of Perm Krai, Russia; one of the thirty-three in the krai. As a municipal division, it is incorporated as Karagaysky Municipal District. It is located in the west of the krai. The area of the district is 1,621 square kilometers (626 sq mi). Its administrative center is the rural locality (a selo) of Karagay. Population: 22,875 (2010 census); 24,792 (2002 census); 25,845 (1989 Soviet census). The population of Karagay accounts for 29.2% of the district's total population.

== Geography and climate ==
The district stretches for 90 kilometers (56 mi) from north to south and for 45 kilometers (28 mi) from west to east. The relief is mostly hilly. Main river is the Obva, which flows through the district from west to east. District's forests are mostly coniferous, predominantly spruce and fir, and account for approximately 75% of the total forested area. Pine forests make up 4%; other forests are deciduous.

The climate of the district is temperate continental with long cold winters and warm but short summers. Average July temperature is +17.6 °C (63.7 °F); average January temperature is −15.7 °C (3.7 °F). Annual precipitation is 430–450 millimeters (17–18 in).

== History ==
The district was established on February 27, 1924 from Bogdanovskaya, Karagayskaya, Nikolskaya, and a part of Ust-Bubinskaya Volost of Okhansky Uyezd and from Kozmodemyanskaya, Obvinskaya, and a part of Sergiyevskaya Volost of Usolsky Uyezd of Perm Governorate. The district was abolished between January 1, 1932 and January 25, 1935 and then again between February 1, 1963 and January 12, 1965.

== Demographics ==
Russians at 93% and the Komi-Permyak people at 2.8% are the predominant ethnic groups in the district.

== Economy ==
The economy of the district is based on agriculture, which accounts for 60.6% of the district's GDP. The most significant industries are the production of building materials, as well as the light and food industries.

== Sources ==
- Законодательное собрание Пермской области. Закон №416-67 от 28 февраля 1996 г. «Об административно-территориальном устройстве Пермского края», в ред. Закона №504-ПК от 9 июля 2015 г. «О внесении изменений в Закон Пермской области "Об административно-территориальном устройстве Пермского края"». Вступил в силу с момента опубликования. Опубликован: "Звезда", №38, 12 марта 1996 г. (Legislative Assembly of Perm Oblast. Law #416-67 of February 28, 1996 On the Administrative-Territorial Structure of Perm Krai, as amended by the Law #504-PK of July 9, 2015 On Amending the Law of Perm Oblast "On the Administrative-Territorial Structure of Perm Krai". Effective as of the moment of publication.).
- Законодательное собрание Пермской области. Закон №1876-406 от 1 декабря 2004 г. «Об утверждении границ и о наделении статусом муниципальных образований Карагайского района Пермского края», в ред. Закона №281-ПК от 26 декабря 2013 г. «О внесении изменений в Приложение 9 Закона Пермской области "Об утверждении границ и о наделении статусом муниципальных образований Карагайского района Пермского края"». Вступил в силу через десять дней со дня официального опубликования. Опубликован: "Бюллетень Законодательного Собрания и администрации Пермской области", №1, II часть, 27 января 2005 г. (Legislative Assembly of Perm Oblast. Law #1876-406 of December 1, 2004 On Establishing the Borders and on Granting the Status to the Municipal Formations of Karagaysky District of Perm Krai, as amended by the Law #281-PK of December 26, 2013 On Amending Appendix 9 of the Law of Perm Oblast "On Establishing the Borders and on Granting the Status to the Municipal Formations of Karagaysky District of Perm Krai". Effective as of the day which is ten days following the day of the official publication.).
