= Rudnya, Volgograd Oblast =

Rudnya Рудня
- Work settlement
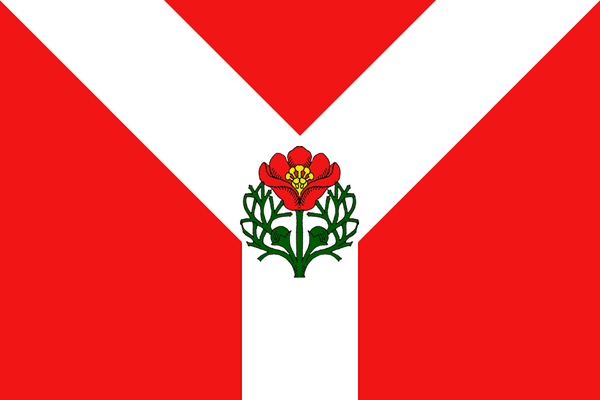
- Flag
- Interactive map of Rudnya
- Location of Rudnya Rudnya (Volgograd Oblast)
- Coordinates: 50°47′N 44°34′E
- Country: Russia
- Federal subject: Volgograd Oblast
- Administrative district: Rudnyansky District
- Founded: 1699

Population (2010 Census)
  - Total: 7,387
  - Estimate (2021): 6,086 (−17.6%)

Administrative status
  - Capital of: Rudnyansky District
- Time zone: UTC+3 (MSK)
- Postal codes: 403601, 403602
- OKTMO ID: 18647151051

Rudnya (Russian: Ру́дня) is an urban locality (a work settlement) and the administrative center of Rudnyansky District in Volgograd Oblast, Russia. Population: 7,387 (2010 census); 8,044 (2002 census); 9,062 (1989 Soviet census).
