= Rudnyansky District, Volgograd Oblast =

Rudnyansky District Руднянский район (Russian)
- District
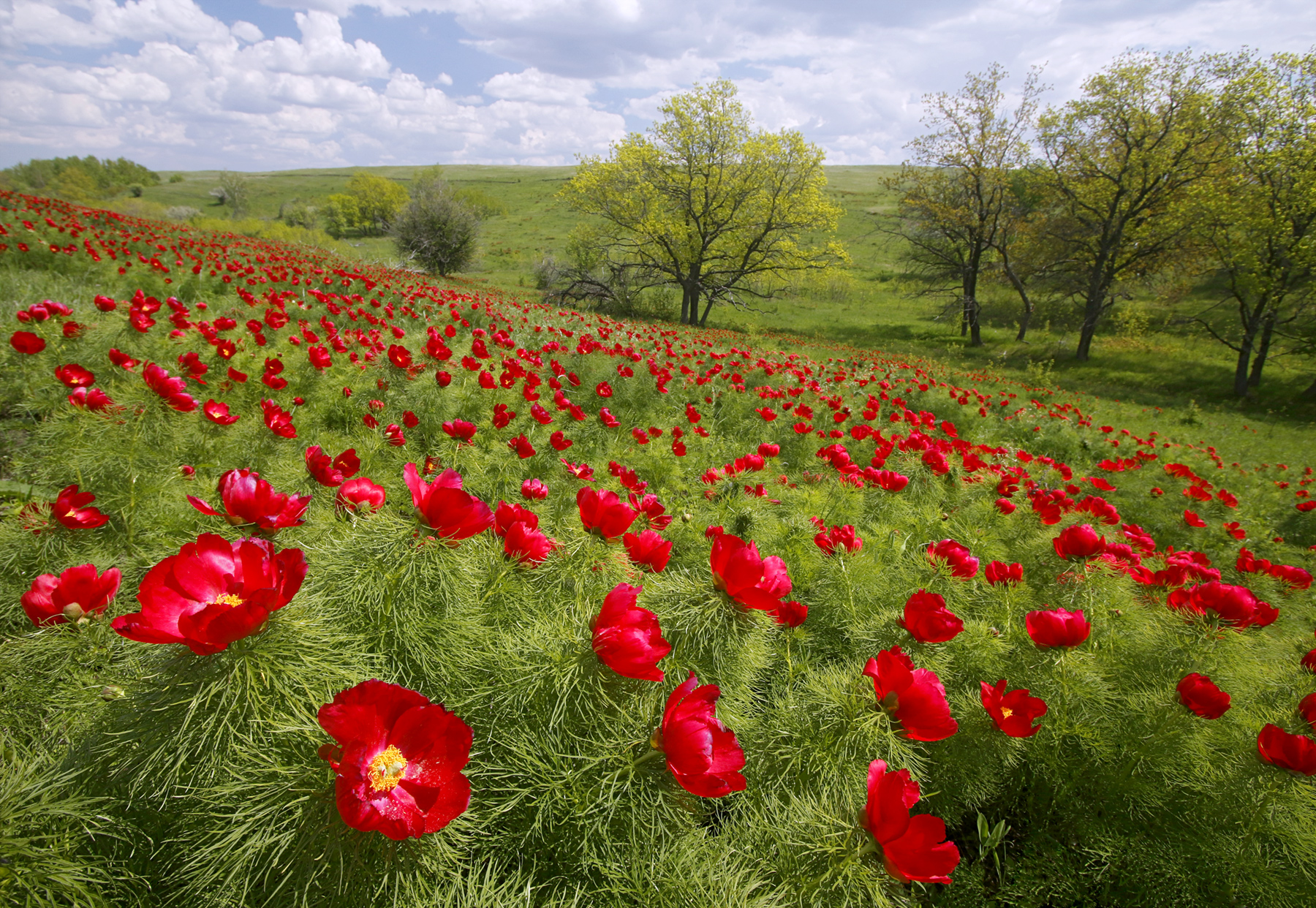
- Nature Area 'Thin-Leafed Peony', Rudnyansky District

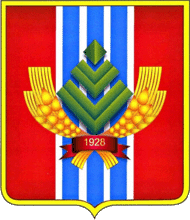
- Flag Coat of arms
- Location of Rudnyansky District in Volgograd Oblast
- Coordinates: 50°47′N 44°33′E
- Country: Russia
- Federal subject: Volgograd Oblast
- Established: 1929
- Administrative center: Rudnya

Area
  - Total: 1,890 km^{2} (730 sq mi)

Population (2010 Census)
  - Total: 17,437
  - Density: 9.23/km^{2} (23.9/sq mi)
  - Urban: 42.4%
  - Rural: 57.6%

Administrative structure
  - Administrative divisions: 1 Urban-type settlements, 9 Selsoviets
  - Inhabited localities: 1 urban-type settlements, 27 rural localities

Municipal structure
  - Municipally incorporated as: Rudnyansky Municipal District
  - Municipal divisions: 1 urban settlements, 9 rural settlements
- Time zone: UTC+3 (MSK)
- OKTMO ID: 18647000
- Website: http://rudn-mr.ru/

Rudnyansky District (Russian: Рудня́нский райо́н) is an administrative district (raion), one of the thirty-three in Volgograd Oblast, Russia. As a municipal division, it is incorporated as Rudnyansky Municipal District. It is located in the north of the oblast. The area of the district is 1,890 square kilometers (730 sq mi). Its administrative center is the urban locality (a work settlement) of Rudnya. Population: 17,437 (2010 census); 19,176 (2002 Census); 20,796 (1989 Soviet census). The population of Rudnya accounts for 42.4% of the district's total population.
