= Bor constituency =

Bor single-member constituency
- Constituency of the Russian State Duma

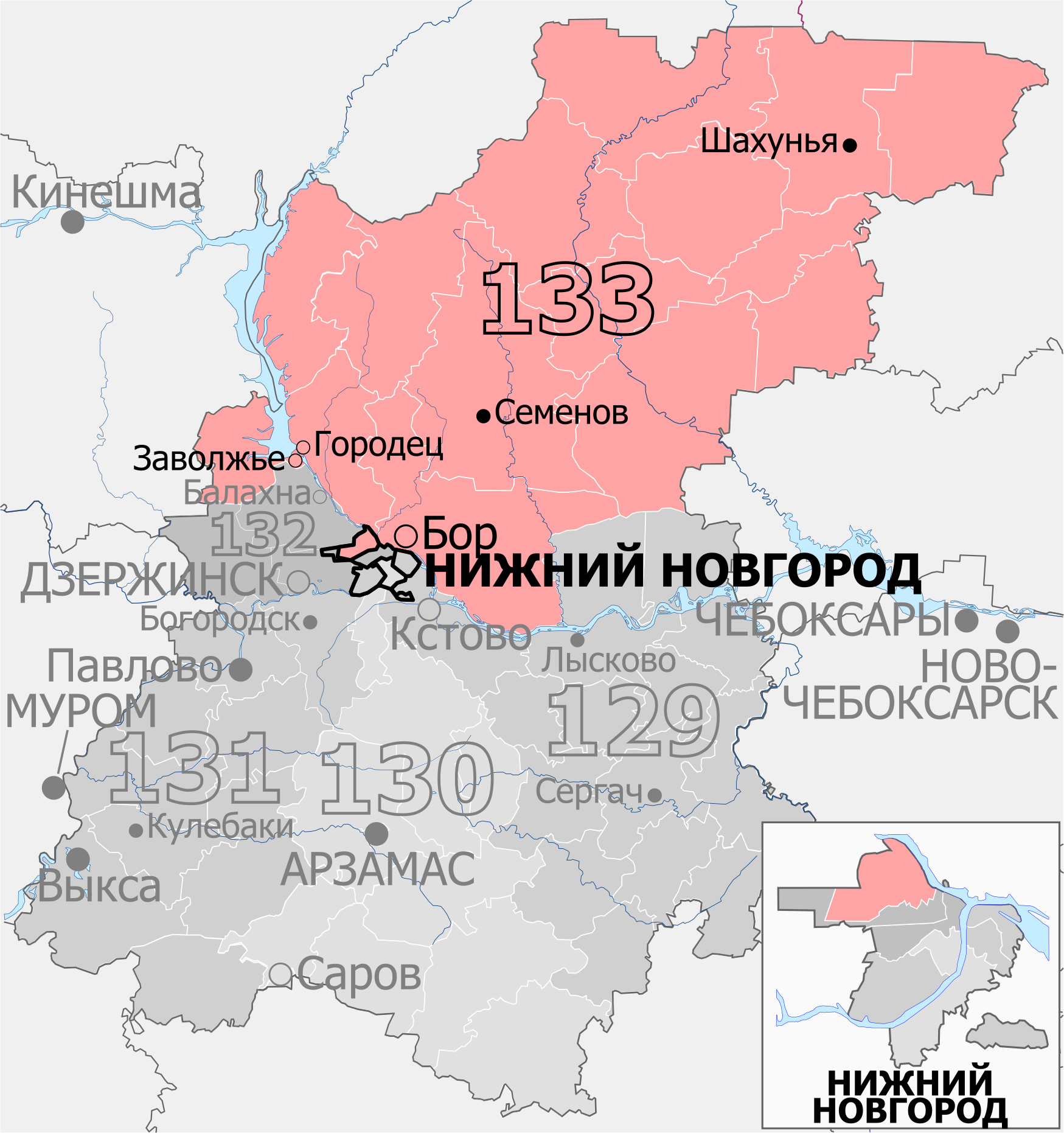
- Constituency boundaries since 2016
- Deputy: Artyom Kavinov; United Russia
- Federal subject: Nizhny Novgorod Oblast
- Districts: Bor, Chkalovsk, Gorodetsky, Koverninsky, Krasnobakovsky, Nizhny Novgorod (Sormovsky), Semyonov, Shakhunya, Sharangsky, Sokolsky, Tonkinsky, Tonshayevsky, Urensky, Varnavinsky, Vetluzhsky, Voskresensky
- Voters: 482,796 (2026)

The Bor constituency (No.135 (Note: Semyonov constituency No.121 in 1993-2003, Semyonov constituency No.122 in 2003-2007, No.133 in 2016–2026)) is a Russian legislative constituency in Nizhny Novgorod Oblast. The constituency covers northern Nizhny Novgorod and rural northern Nizhny Novgorod Oblast.

The constituency has been represented since 2016 by United Russia deputy Artyom Kavinov, former Minister of Social Policy of Nizhny Novgorod Oblast.

== Boundaries ==
1993–1995 Semyonov constituency: Balakhna, Balakhninsky District, Chkalovsky District, Gorodets, Gorodetsky District, Koverninsky District, Krasnobakovsky District, Semyonov, Semyonovsky District, Shakhunsky District, Sharangsky District, Tonkinsky District, Tonshayevsky District, Urensky District, Varnavinsky District, Vetluzhsky District, Volodarsky District, Voskresensky District
The constituency covered rural northern Nizhny Novgorod Oblast, including the cities Balakhna, Gorodets and Semyonov.

1995–2007 Semyonov constituency: Balakhninsky District, Chkalovsky District, Gorodetsky District, Koverninsky District, Krasnobakovsky District, Semyonovsky District, Shakhunsky District, Sharangsky District, Sokolsky District, Tonkinsky District, Tonshayevsky District, Urensky District, Varnavinsky District, Vetluzhsky District, Volodarsky District, Voskresensky District
After 1995 the constituency was slightly altered, gaining Sokolsky District from Kineshma constituency after the municipality was transferred from Kostroma Oblast to Nizhny Novgorod Oblast in 1994.

2016–present: Bor, Chkalovsk, Gorodetsky District, Koverninsky District, Krasnobakovsky District, Nizhny Novgorod (Sormovsky), Semyonov, Shakhunya, Sharangsky District, Sokolsky District, Tonkinsky District, Tonshayevsky District, Urensky District, Varnavinsky District, Vetluzhsky District, Voskresensky District
The constituency was re-created for the 2016 election under the name "Bor constituency" and most of its former territory in northern Nizhny Novgorod Oblast, losing Balakhninsky and Volodarsky districts to Kanavinsky constituency. This seat gained Sormovsky City District of Nizhny Novgorod from Kanavinsky constituency and its industrial satellite cityBor from the former Kstovo constituency.

== Members elected ==
Election	Member	Party
1993	Tatyana Chertoritskaya	Independent
1995	Gennady Khodyrev (Note: appointed Minister for Antimonopoly Policy of Russia in October 1998)	Communist Party
1999	Nikolay Kosterin	Independent
2003	Aleksandr Khinshtein	Independent
2007	Proportional representation - no election by constituency	
2011	Proportional representation - no election by constituency	
2016	Artyom Kavinov	United Russia
2021	Artyom Kavinov	United Russia
2026	Artyom Kavinov	United Russia

== Election results ==
=== 1993 ===
Summary of the 12 December 1993 Russian legislative election in the Semyonov constituency
Candidate	Party	Votes	%
Tatyana Chertoritskaya	Independent	60,735	26.10%
Gennady Khodyrev	Independent	55,615	23.90%
Nikolay Kosterin	Agrarian Party	34,985	15.03%
Sergey Polozkov	Civic Union	18,093	7.77%
Gennady Komarov	Independent	12,605	5.42%
Mikhail Isakov	Democratic Party	5,061	2.17%
against all		25,239	10.84%
Total		232,739	100%

=== 1995 ===
Summary of the 17 December 1995 Russian legislative election in the Semyonov constituency
Candidate	Party	Votes	%
Gennady Khodyrev	Communist Party	76,171	27.20%
Tatyana Chertoritskaya (incumbent)	Independent	60,165	21.48%
Vladimir Sedov	Independent	34,891	12.46%
Yury Tarasov	Independent	31,550	11.27%
Dmitry Sochnev	Our Home – Russia	11,079	3.96%
Viktor Shamov	Liberal Democratic Party	8,285	2.96%
Nikolay Ivashko	Independent	7,350	2.62%
Yevgeny Mamontov	Independent	6,692	2.39%
Granit Virgasov	Independent	6,681	2.39%
Vladislav Vishnepolsky	Democratic Choice of Russia – United Democrats	4,474	1.60%
Aleksandr Tolstov	Independent	4,391	1.57%
against all		21,234	7.58%
Total		280,045	100%

=== 1999 ===
Summary of the 19 December 1999 Russian legislative election in the Semyonov constituency
Candidate	Party	Votes	%
Nikolay Kosterin	Independent	114,866	44.96%
Sergey Voronov	Independent	55,950	21.90%
Tatyana Chertoritskaya	Independent	23,197	9.08%
Viktor Shamov	Independent	7,379	2.89%
Igor Ruzankin	Our Home – Russia	5,331	2.09%
Nikolay Tishkin	Andrey Nikolayev and Svyatoslav Fyodorov Bloc	4,166	1.63%
Vladimir Isayev	Liberal Democratic Party	4,054	1.59%
Rustem Sultanov	Independent	3,274	1.28%
Yury Novokshanov	Congress of Russian Communities-Yury Boldyrev Movement	1,767	0.69%
Andrey Pilyugin	Spiritual Heritage	1,066	0.42%
Dmitry Perevaryukha	Independent	898	0.35%
against all		28,760	11.26%
Total		255,488	100%

=== 2003 ===
Summary of the 7 December 2003 Russian legislative election in the Semyonov constituency
Candidate	Party	Votes	%
Aleksandr Khinshtein	Independent	85,032	38.79%
Nikolay Kosterin (incumbent)	Agrarian Party	42,138	19.22%
Aleksandr Glukhovskoy	Independent	22,410	10.22%
Eduard Zhitukhin	Communist Party	18,813	8.58%
Valery Yemelyanov	Liberal Democratic Party	9,632	4.39%
Aleksandr Kirin	Independent	9,022	4.12%
Aleksandr Yevdokimov	Great Russia – Eurasian Union	4,248	1.94%
against all		24,099	10.99%
Total		219,387	100%

=== 2016 ===
Summary of the 18 September 2016 Russian legislative election in the Bor constituency
Candidate	Party	Votes	%
Artyom Kavinov	United Russia	148,499	59.49%
Mikhail Sukharev	Communist Party	27,920	11.18%
Dmitry Chugrin	Liberal Democratic Party	26,904	10.78%
Kirill Lychagin	A Just Russia	10,444	4.18%
Sergey Yudin	Communists of Russia	7,976	3.20%
Aleksey Vetoshkin	Yabloko	6,292	2.52%
Viktor Shamov	Rodina	5,405	2.17%
Irina Sevridova	Party of Growth	4,823	1.93%
Roman Zykov	Patriots of Russia	3,569	1.43%
Total		249,623	100%

=== 2021 ===
Summary of the 17-19 September 2021 Russian legislative election in the Bor constituency
Candidate	Party	Votes	%
Artyom Kavinov (incumbent)	United Russia	129,582	51.11%
Roman Kabeshev	Communist Party	40,563	16.00%
Igor Chkalov	A Just Russia — For Truth	22,593	8.91%
Dmitry Chugrin	Liberal Democratic Party	21,327	8.41%
Ilya Pokhlebkin	Party of Pensioners	15,969	6.30%
Artyom Bazhenov	Party of Growth	9,241	3.64%
Viktor Shamov	Rodina	6,230	2.46%
Total		253,547	100%

=== 2026 ===
Summary of the 18-20 September 2026 Russian legislative election in the Bor constituency
Candidate	Party	Votes	%
Artyom Kavinov (incumbent)	United Russia	188,527	58.24%
Roman Kabeshev	Communist Party	39,584	12.23%
Vladislav Atmakhov	Liberal Democratic Party	34,889	10.78%
Andrey Devonin	New People	23,706	7.32%
Yevgeny Lepekhin	A Just Russia	15,368	4.75%
Aleksandr Tsopov	Party of Pensioners	9,016	2.79%
Nikita Maslov	The Greens	8,099	2.50%
Total		323,691	100%
