= Gorodets =

Gorodets may refer to:

- Gorodets Urban Settlement, a municipal formation which the town of district significance of Gorodets in Gorodetsky District of Nizhny Novgorod Oblast, Russia is incorporated as
- Krasny Gorodets
- Gorodets, Russia, several inhabited localities in Russia
- Gorodets, Belarus, several inhabited localities in Belarus
- Gorodets painting, a style of folk art originating in the Gorodetsky District of Nizhny Novgorod Oblast, Russia
