= Lake Svetloyar =

Lake in Russia

- Светлояр (Russian)
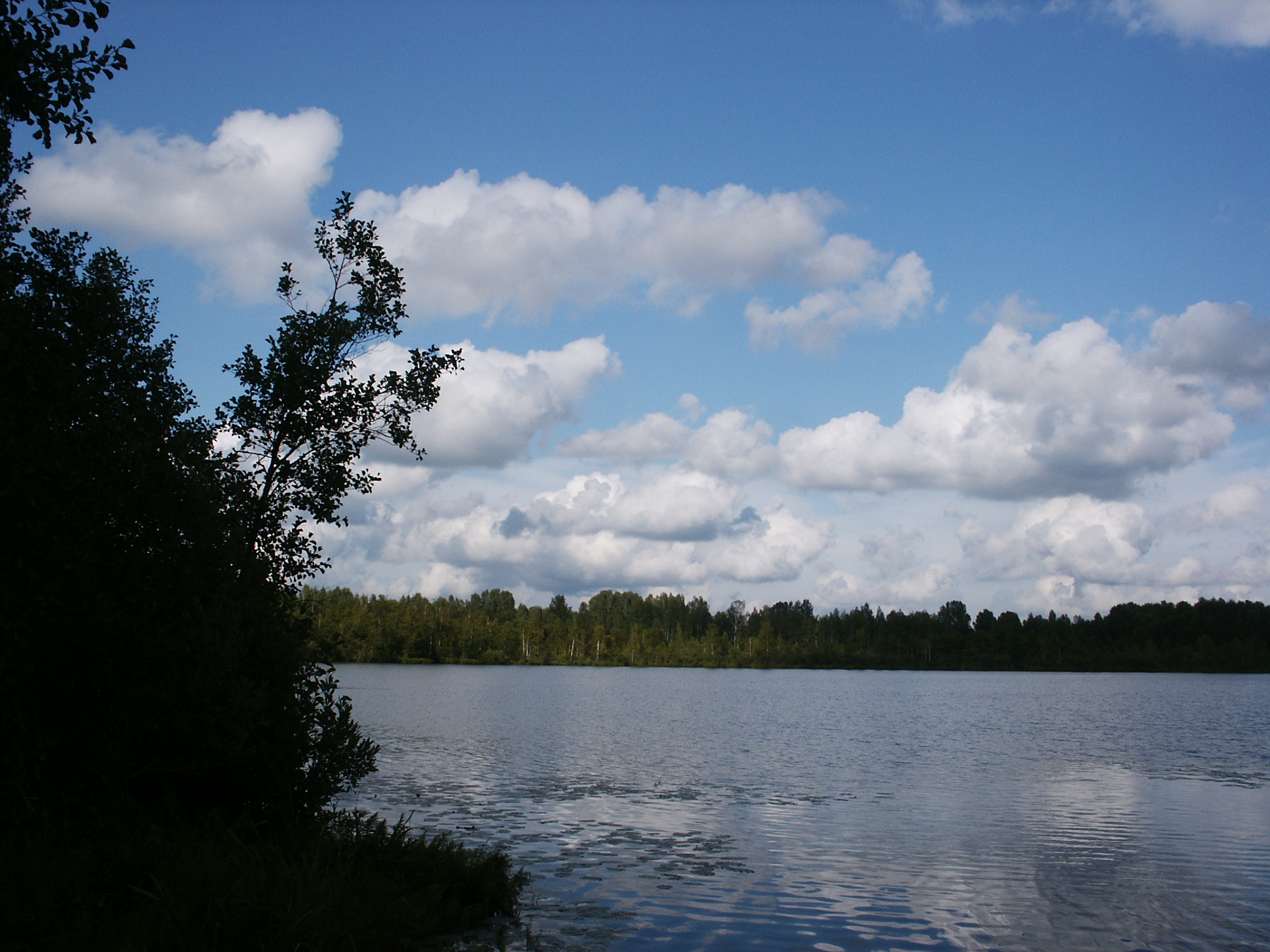

- Location within Russia
- Location: Nizhny Novgorod Oblast
- Coordinates: 56°49′07″N 45°05′35″E
- Type: unknown
- Max. length: 0.5 kilometres (0.31 mi)
- Max. width: 0.35 kilometres (0.22 mi)
- Surface area: 0.1483 square kilometres (0.0573 sq mi)
- Max. depth: 33.4 metres (110 ft)
- Surface elevation: 109 metres (358 ft)

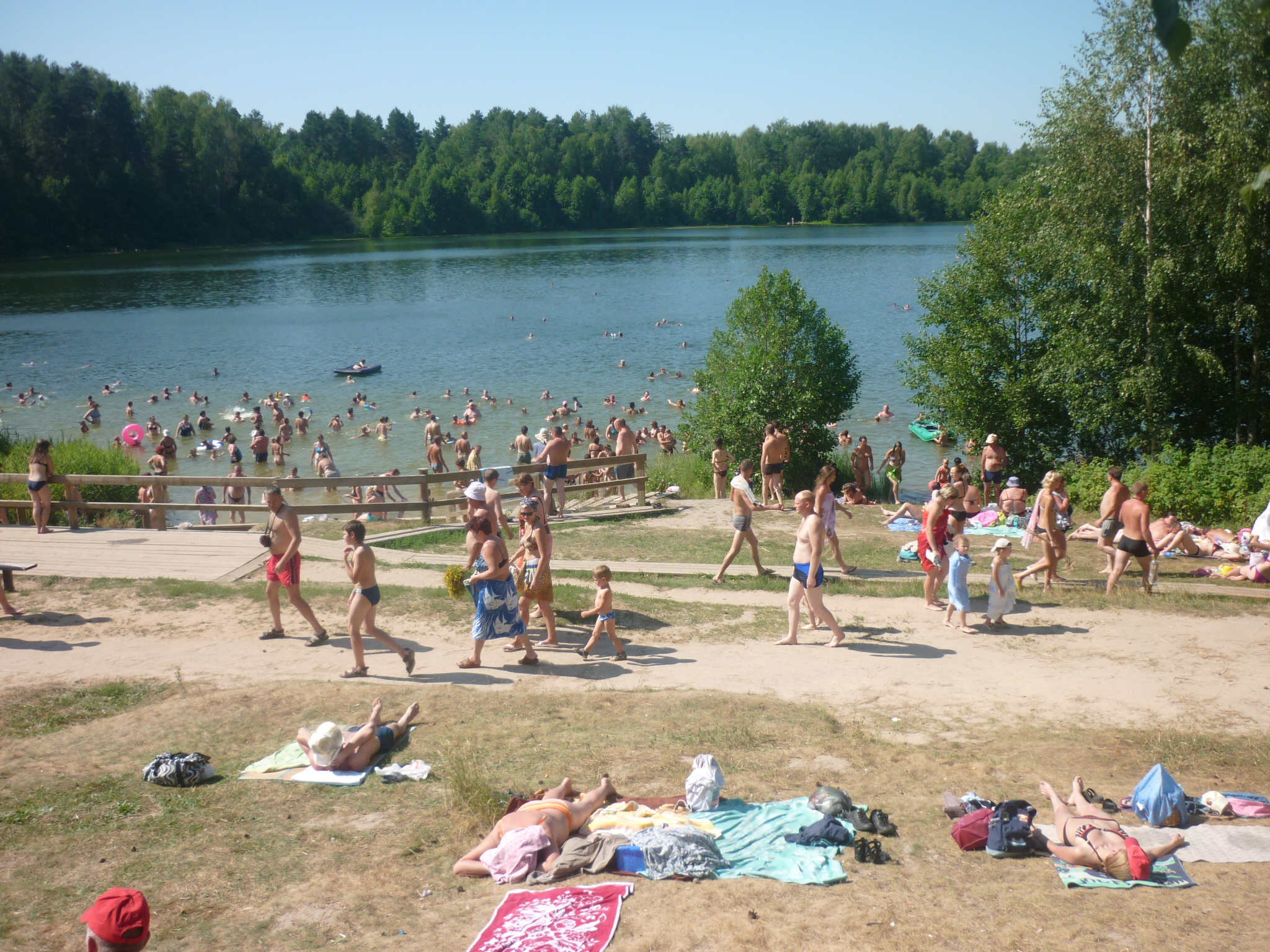
Summer bathers on the shores of Lake Svetloyar

Lake Svetloyar (Russian: Озеро Светлоя́р, romanized: ozero svetloyar = "lake of the bright bank/ravine") is a lake in the Voskresensky District of the Nizhny Novgorod Oblast in central Russia. It is located within Voskresenskoe Povetluzhye Nature Park. In 2015, the lake was included in the Register of Cultural Heritage Objects as an object of cultural heritage of local significance. It is closely associated with the Legend of Kitezh, a sunken city.

== Description ==
The lake is situated between the Kerzhenets and Vetluga rivers, both tributaries of the Volga. (Note: the protection zone of the Nizhny Novgorod Povetluzhye, a nature park of regional significance) The area was declared a natural park in 2008. The lake is oval in shape (470 × 350 m) with the longer axis aligned north-south. It reaches a depth of 33.4 m. Its deepest point is in the southern part of the lake, which rises to a shallow platform ranging in depth from 22 to 24 m. In the northern, relatively shallow part of the lake, the depth change is smoother comparatively.

The surface of the lake is 109 m above sea level. Its shores are somewhat elevated and the lake itself lies in a small basin. The hills that encircle it are most prominent to the south, where they form an arc. The height of the hills reaches 122–124 m above sea level (13–15 m above the lake's water level) and are separated by deep (7–8 m) ravines.

The lake's water is transparent to a depth of more than 5 m. The lake is said to be relatively cold and its banks are somewhat swampy. To the north-east is the small, shallow Lunda River, to which the lake is connected by a stream. The runoff from the lake through the stream was disturbed during the construction of a road during the Soviet era. As a result, the lake began to swamp. Restoration of natural lake flow occurred in the 1990s.

In the 2000s, a number of studies confirmed the meteorite hypothesis of the origin of Svetloyar and some neighboring lakes. In 2009, the results of field studies were published, confirming the hypothesis of the meteoric origin of the lake 3.0-3.2 thousand years ago.

The volume of the lake basin (not the lake itself) is about 1.5 km^{3}, and the area of the lake itself is 14.83 hectares. The thickness of the bottom sediments is about 8 m.

== Origin ==
Various researchers during different timeframes have hypothesized about the glacial, karstic, old, volcanic, neotectonic, salt-dome, and meteorite origin of the lake. The first explorer of the lake in the late 19th century was a Russian geologist, Vasily Dokuchaev, who suggested it was a meteorite crater. The volcanic origin of the lake was first suggested in the early 20th century by the writer Vladimir Korolenko. Amateur archaeologist A. P. Polivanov conducted excavations on one of the Svetlogorsk hills and discovered the remains of ancient tools of Stone Age provenance.

In 1969, under the leadership of Mark M. Barinov, scuba divers using sonar bathymetry detailed the complex structure of the relief of the bottom of the lake. The central pit-hollow is fringed by a system of two underwater terraces, expanding in the northern and narrowing in the southern parts of the lake and having depths of 18-20 and 9–10 m, respectively. It was suggested that a multistage cyclic-periodic formation, very young in the scale of geological time, as a result of neotectonic processes. Based on this, it was concluded that the central basin was formed a little more than a millennium (about 1100–1200 years) ago in the form of a small lake with a depth of 15–17 m, and the immersion of the lower terrace occurred approximately 700–800 years ago.

19/9/2009 the origin of Svetloyar and some neighboring lakes. In 2009, the results of field studies bolstered the hypothesis of the meteoric origin of the lake, around 3,000 years ago. The correct form, depth, the geological structure of the surrounding hills, the stratigraphy of bottom sediments, numerous fragments of fused rocks, rounded teardrop formations ejected from a foamy, black, vitreous mass, analogous to impactites, attest to the meteorite origin of the lake. Geological evidence suggests that the meteor that created Svetloyar would have been travelling from north to south along a low trajectory at an angle of 30-40 ° to the Earth's surface.

== Media coverage ==
In 1993, the creative association "Ekran" (Russian: Экран, romanized: Ekran, lit. 'Screen') released the film "The Tale of the Great and Invisible City of Kitezh" (writer and director V. Kukushkin), about "the mythological roots and the search for the invisible" City of Kitezh under Lake Svetloyar. (Note: description given by the site of the Radio and Television Fund of the Russian Federation) The film was shown on the first channel of Central Television in Easter on April 17, 1993, before the first television broadcast of the Easter service from the Epiphany Cathedral in Moscow.

== In literature ==
In the 19th century novel In the Forests by the ethnographer-fiction writer PI Melnikov-Pechersky, Lake Svetloyar is described as an ancient site of folk pilgrimage preserving lively vestiges of paganism, which, through the efforts of "zealots of ancient piety" from neighboring sketes, were gradually eradicated in the people's memory and replaced by the pious fable of the "invisible city of Kitezh":

The elders and reverend mothers of the skete (monastery) were scandalised... "Why", said they, "this nightly splashing in the waters of the lake? Why are baptized folk cavorting thus, entertaining the devil with the rattling of their tambourines, defiling the holy days of the Lord with the strumming of strings, with devilish ditties, shameless bathing and dances bacchanalian as those of damned Herodias? .. Why do women - wives and virgins alike - attend these satanic gatherings?… Why, in their ungodly dances, do they loll their heads, contort their bodies, leap into the air, stamp their feet and defile their lips with indecent singing?!… It is not seemly to do this! It is an abomination unto God, damned by the holy fathers!…"

And they proclaimed Svetly Yar (trans. "the bright bank" or "the ravine of light /of Yarilo(?)") and the hills above it to be "holy places"..."Here" said they, "there is a beautiful city, home to God's saints, the city of Great Kitezh...But, because we humans are all sinners, it is invisible to us - we cannot see its beauty - and if you (lay-folk) persist in your devilish practices the place will be polluted by your foul deeds..."

And the God-fearing elders and honorable mothers began to visit Lake Svetloyar, bearing holy books, crosses and icons to its shores...They began to read the psalter and sing canons on the shores of the lake, fabricated the Chronicle of Kitezh and began to read it to the people who came to the lake to celebrate the pagan rites of Yarilo. And at these new, Christian gatherings, lights other than those kindled of yore began to glow, for, on the eve of the feast of Saint Agrafena, the bathers would hang lamps upon the oaks, sculpt wax candles and hang icons upon the branches...

In the Forests
Pavel Ivanovich Melnikov-Pechersky
