= Gorky Reservoir =

Body of water in Russia

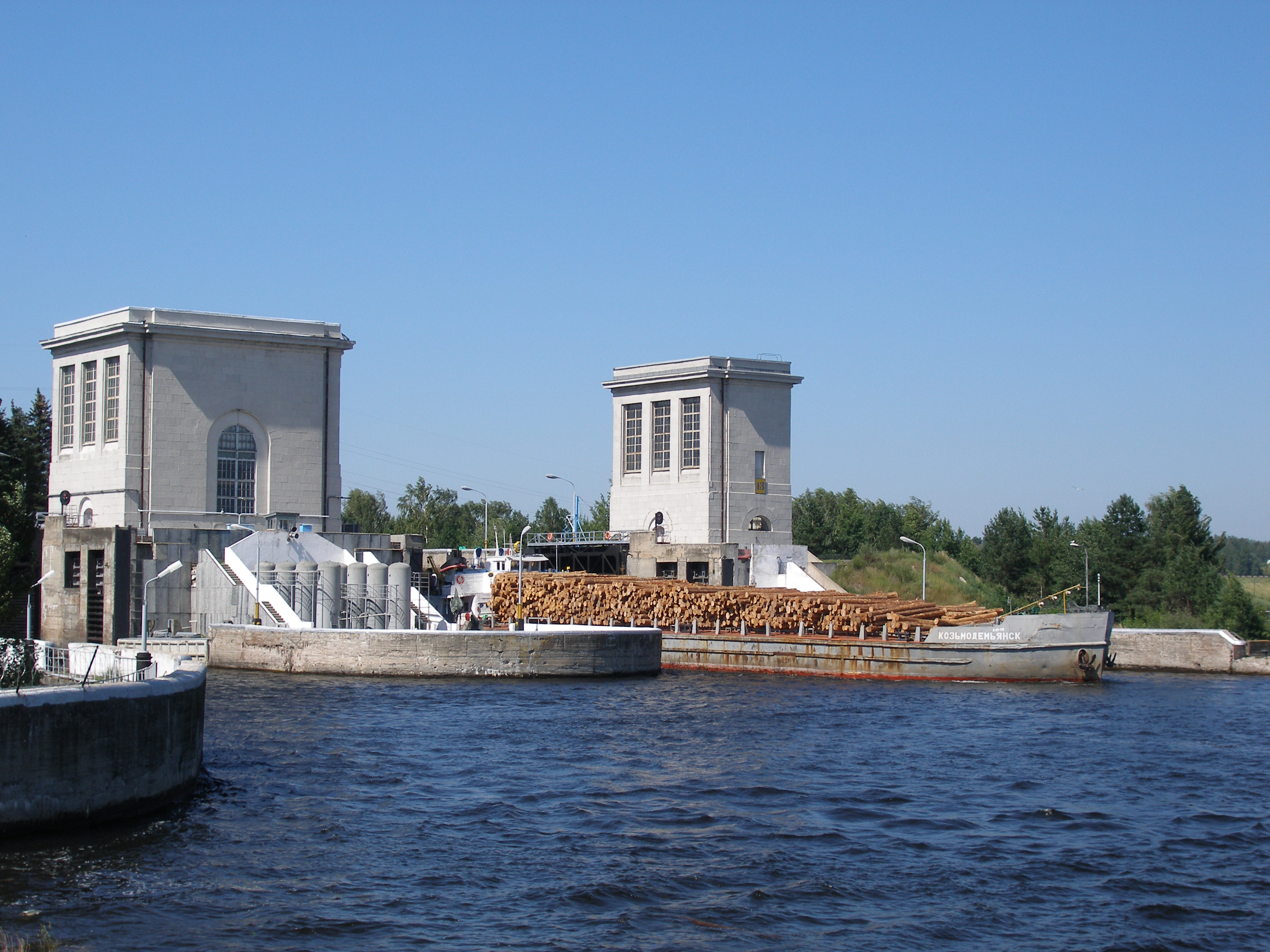

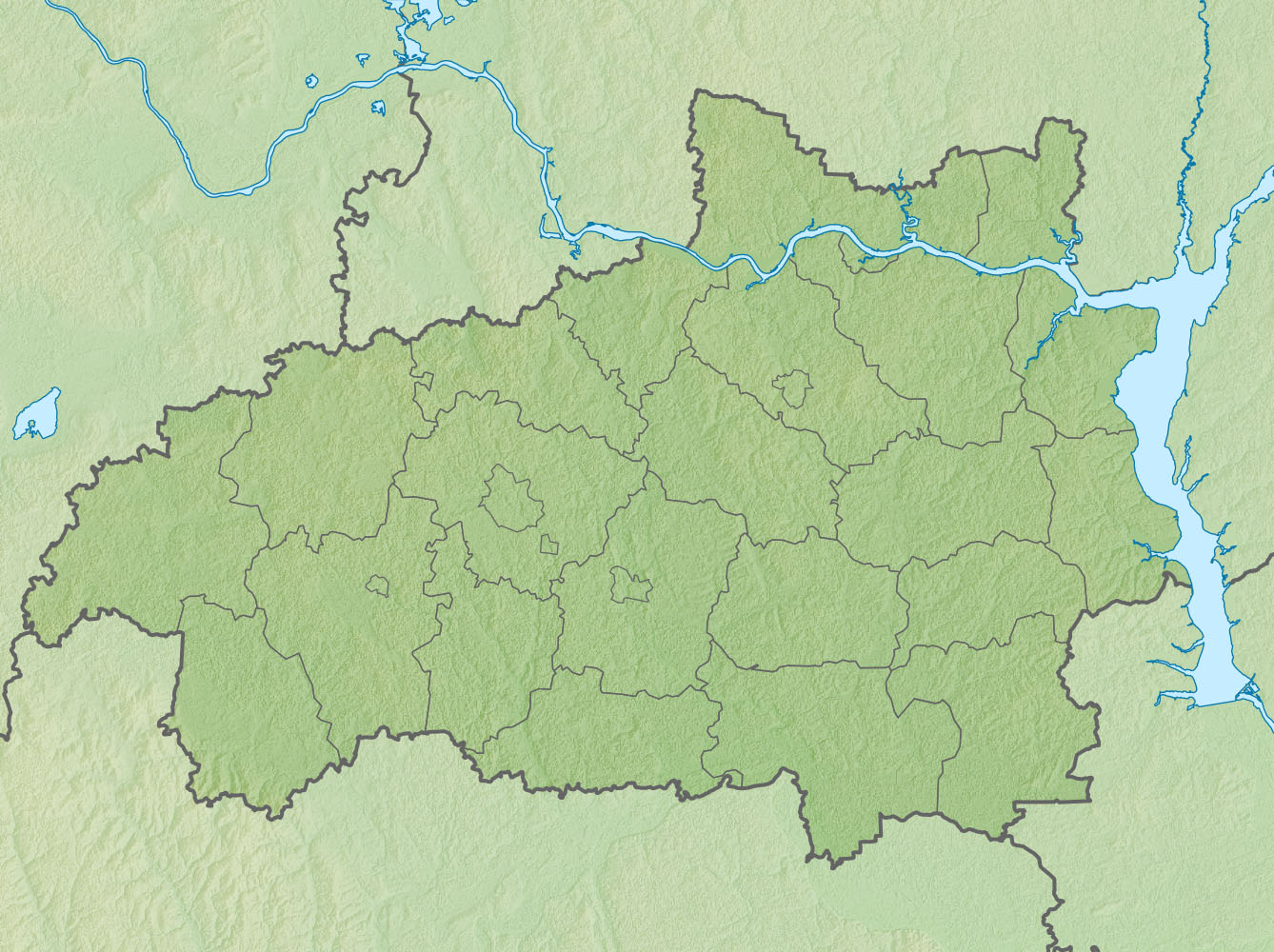
- Location within Ivanovo Oblast
- Coordinates: 57°00′N 43°10′E
- Type: Hydroelectric reservoir
- Primary inflows: Volga
- Basin countries: Russia
- Max. length: 430 km (270 mi)
- Max. width: 16 km (9.9 mi)
- Surface area: 1,591 km^{2} (614 sq mi)
- Max. depth: 22 m (72 ft)
- Water volume: 12.9 km^{3} (10,500,000 acre⋅ft)
- Surface elevation: 84 m (276 ft)
- Settlements: Yaroslavl, Kostroma, Kineshma, Yuryetets

Gorky Reservoir (Russian: Го́рьковское водохрани́лище), known colloquially as Gorky Sea (Russian: Го́рьковское мо́ре), is an artificial lake in the central part of the Volga River in Russia, formed by a hydroelectric dam of Gorky Hydroelectric Station (now called Nizhny Novgorod Hydroelectric Station) built in 1955 between the towns of Gorodets and Zavolzhye and filled in 1955 – 1957. It spans for 430 km from the dam of Rybinsk to the dam of Gorodets through Yaroslavl, Kostroma, Ivanovo and Nizhny Novgorod oblasts of Russia. While it is relatively narrow and follows the natural riverbed of Volga in the upper part, it becomes up to 16 km wide downstream the town of Yuryevets.

The reservoir takes its name from the former name of the city of Nizhny Novgorod (actually situated some fifty kilometers downstream the dam), which was called Gorky during the Soviet period. An industrial town of Zavolzhye was built on the right bank of the Volga along with the construction of the dam.

The filling of the reservoir resulted in the relocation of a number of villages and towns, such as Chkalovsk.
