= Zavolzhye =

Zavolzhye may refer to:

- Transvolga, a territory to the east of the Volga River in Russia
- Zavolzhye Urban Settlement, a municipal formation which the town of district significance of Zavolzhye in Gorodetsky District of Nizhny Novgorod Oblast, Russia is incorporated as
- Zavolzhye (inhabited locality), several inhabited localities in Russia
