= Kitezh =

Legendary city under Lake Svetloyar, Russia

Coordinates: 56°49′8.1″N 45°5′34.6″E

Kitezh (Russian: Ки́теж) is a legendary and mythical city said to be beneath the waters of Lake Svetloyar in the Voskresensky District of the Nizhny Novgorod Oblast in central Russia. Reference to Kitezh appears for the first time in Kitezh Chronicle, an anonymous book from the late 18th century, believed to have originated among the Old Believers.

== The legend ==
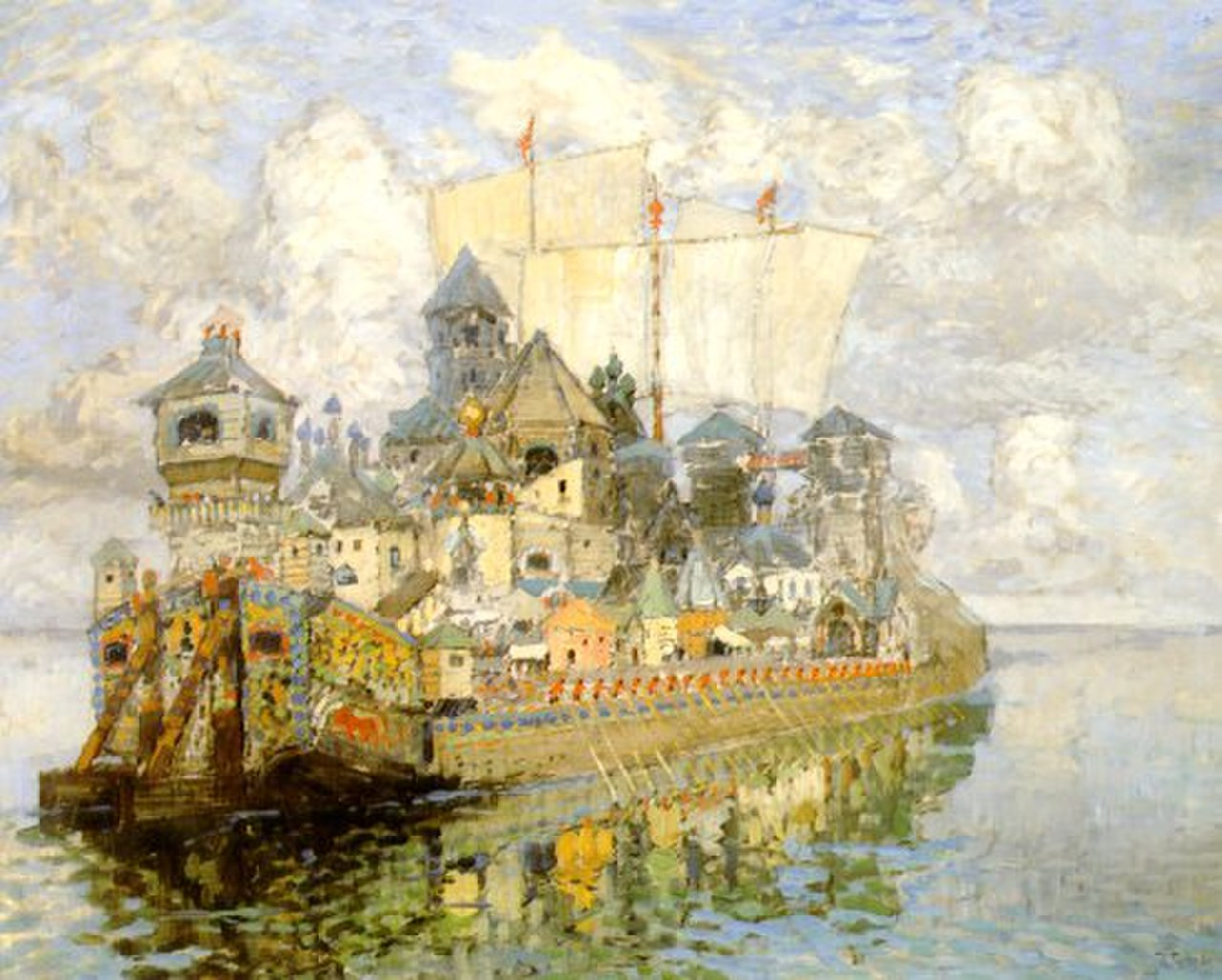
The Invisible Town of Kitezh (1913) by Konstantin Gorbatov

According to legend, Georgy II, Grand Prince of Vladimir (r. 1212–1238), first built the town of Maly Kitezh (Little Kitezh - present-day Krasny Kholm, Yaroslavsky District, Yaroslavl Oblast) on the Volga River. Maly Kitezh (Russian: Малый Китеж) is sometimes identified with Gorodets, which was actually founded in 1152, more than 30 years before Georgy's birth in 1189. Later on, the prince crossed the rivers of Uzola, Sanda, and Kerzhenets, and found a beautiful spot on the shores of Lake Svetloyar, where he decided to build the town of Bolshoy Kitezh (Great Kitezh). According to folk etymology, the name of the town came from the royal residence of Kideksha (near Suzdal), ransacked by the Mongols in 1237; Max Vasmer labels the place-name as "obscure".

After having conquered some of the Russian lands in the late 1230s, the Mongol ruler Batu Khan (Khan of the Golden Horde from 1227 to 1255) heard of Kitezh and ordered his army to advance towards it. The Mongols soon captured Maly Kitezh, forcing Georgy to retreat into the woods towards Bolshoy Kitezh. One of the prisoners told the Mongols about some secret paths to Lake Svetloyar. The army of the Golden Horde followed Georgy and soon reached the walls of the town. To the surprise of the Mongols, the town had no fortifications whatsoever. Its citizens didn't even intend to defend themselves and were engaged in fervent praying, asking God for their salvation. On seeing this, the Mongols rushed to the attack, but then stopped. Suddenly, they saw countless fountains of water bursting from under the ground all around them. The attackers fell back and watched the town submerge into the lake. The last thing they saw was a glaring dome of a cathedral with a cross on top of it. Soon only waves remained.

This legend gave birth to numerous incredible claims about the lost city. It is said that only those who are pure in their heart and soul will find their way to Kitezh (the road to the lake is still called Батыева тропа, or the Path of Batu). Allegedly, one can sometimes hear the sound of chiming bells and people singing from under the waters of Lake Svetloyar when the weather is calm. Some stories claim that the most pious individuals may actually see the lights of religious processions (called крестный ход) and even buildings on the bottom of the lake. For this reason, Lake Svetloyar is sometimes called the "Russian Atlantis".

== In literature and the arts ==
- Nikolai Rimsky-Korsakov's opera The Legend of the Invisible City of Kitezh and the Maiden Fevroniya (1907) is based on the legend of Kitezh.
- A theme in Anna Akhmatova's poem "The Way of All the Earth" or "Woman of Kitezh" (Kitezhanka or Китежанка).
- The town is also mentioned, among many other references to Russian folklore, in Monday Begins on Saturday, a 1965 novel by Boris and Arkady Strugatsky and Charodey film and film script.
- The film The Battle of Kerzhenets (1971) is based on the legend of Kitezh.
- The acclaimed German filmmaker Werner Herzog went in search of Kitezh in his short documentary Bells from the Deep (1993).
- Kitezh is mentioned in the 2010 novel Kraken by China Miéville. "Marge read of their utopias, sunk not in ruination but reward: Kitezh, Atlantis, Tyno Helig."
- Kitezh is the childhood nickname of Tilda Swinton's character Emma Recchi in the film I Am Love (2009, Luca Guadagnino).
- Tunturia's album Invisible City (2012) is an instrumental concept album that follows six stages of the rise and fall of Kitezh.
- A fictionalized version of Kitezh is rediscovered by the protagonist Lara Croft in the 2015 video game Rise of the Tomb Raider developed by Crystal Dynamics.
- Kitezh is used as the name of one of the planets in the video game Signalis.

== See also ==
- Buyan
- Lyonesse
