= Gorodets, Russia =

Gorodets (Russian: Городец) is the name of several inhabited localities in Russia.

== Bryansk Oblast ==
As of 2010, four rural localities in Bryansk Oblast bear this name:

- Gorodets, Bryansky District, Bryansk Oblast, a village in Chernetovsky Selsoviet of Bryansky District
- Gorodets, Dubrovsky District, Bryansk Oblast, a village in Mareyevsky Selsoviet of Dubrovsky District
- Gorodets, Surazhsky District, Bryansk Oblast, a settlement in Kulazhsky Selsoviet of Surazhsky District
- Gorodets, Vygonichsky District, Bryansk Oblast, a selo in Gorodetsky Selsoviet of Vygonichsky District

== Kaluga Oblast ==
As of 2010, four rural localities in Kaluga Oblast bear this name:

- Gorodets, Kozelsky District, Kaluga Oblast, a village in Kozelsky District
- Gorodets, Kuybyshevsky District, Kaluga Oblast, a village in Kuybyshevsky District
- Gorodets, Meshchovsky District, Kaluga Oblast, a selo in Meshchovsky District
- Gorodets, Yukhnovsky District, Kaluga Oblast, a village in Yukhnovsky District

== Leningrad Oblast ==
As of 2010, one rural locality in Leningrad Oblast bears this name:

- Gorodets, Leningrad Oblast, a village in Volodarskoye Settlement Municipal Formation of Luzhsky District

== Moscow Oblast ==
As of 2010, one rural locality in Moscow Oblast bears this name:

- Gorodets, Moscow Oblast, a selo in Zarudenskoye Rural Settlement of Kolomensky District

== Nizhny Novgorod Oblast ==
As of 2010, one urban locality in Nizhny Novgorod Oblast bears this name:

- Gorodets, Nizhny Novgorod Oblast, a town in Gorodetsky District; administratively incorporated as a town of district significance

== Pskov Oblast ==
As of 2010, one rural locality in Pskov Oblast bears this name:

- Gorodets, Pskov Oblast, a village in Kunyinsky District

== Ryazan Oblast ==
As of 2010, one rural locality in Ryazan Oblast bears this name:

- Gorodets, Ryazan Oblast, a selo in Gorodetsky Rural Okrug of Spassky District

== Smolensk Oblast ==
As of 2010, six rural localities in Smolensk Oblast bear this name:

- Gorodets, Demidovsky District, Smolensk Oblast, a village in Zaboryevskoye Rural Settlement of Demidovsky District
- Gorodets, Krasninsky District, Smolensk Oblast, a village in Volkovskoye Rural Settlement of Krasninsky District
- Gorodets, Monastyrshchinsky District, Smolensk Oblast, a village in Novomikhaylovskoye Rural Settlement of Monastyrshchinsky District
- Gorodets, Shumyachsky District, Smolensk Oblast, a village in Ozernoye Rural Settlement of Shumyachsky District
- Gorodets, Budnitskoye Rural Settlement, Velizhsky District, Smolensk Oblast, a village in Budnitskoye Rural Settlement of Velizhsky District
- Gorodets, Sitkovskoye Rural Settlement, Velizhsky District, Smolensk Oblast, a village in Sitkovskoye Rural Settlement of Velizhsky District

== Tver Oblast ==
As of 2010, one rural locality in Tver Oblast bears this name:

- Gorodets, Tver Oblast, a village in Ostashkovsky District

== Ulyanovsk Oblast ==
As of 2010, one rural locality in Ulyanovsk Oblast bears this name:

- Gorodets, Ulyanovsk Oblast, a village in Nikitinsky Rural Okrug of Sursky District

== Vladimir Oblast ==
As of 2010, one rural locality in Vladimir Oblast bears this name:

- Gorodets, Vladimir Oblast, a village in Kolchuginsky District
