= Zavolzhye (inhabited locality) =

Zavolzhye (Russian: Заво́лжье) is one of the several inhabited localities in Russia.

== Urban localities ==
- Zavolzhye, Nizhny Novgorod Oblast, a town in Gorodetsky District of Nizhny Novgorod Oblast

== Rural localities ==
- Zavolzhye, Samara Oblast, a selo in Privolzhsky District of Samara Oblast
- Zavolzhye, Tver Oblast, a village in Kashinsky District of Tver Oblast
- Zavolzhye, Yaroslavl Oblast, a settlement in Pestretsovsky Rural Okrug of Yaroslavsky District of Yaroslavl Oblast

== Historical names ==
- Zavolzhye, former name of Zavolzhsk, a town in Ivanovo Oblast
