= Project 14400 training ship =

Class of Russian training ship

Class overview
- Name: Project 14400
- Builders: JSC Shiprepair & Shipbuilding Corporation, Gorodets
- Operators: Russian Navy
- Built: 2018–present
- Planned: 1
- Completed: 1

General characteristics
- Type: Training ship
- Displacement: 842 tons (full load)
- Length: 66.9 m (219 ft)
- Beam: 12.7 m (42 ft)
- Draught: 2.1 m (6 ft 11 in)
- Speed: 12 kn (22 km/h; 14 mph)
- Range: 500 nmi (930 km; 580 mi)
- Endurance: 2 days
- Aviation facilities: 1 x helipad

Project 14400 is a training ship designed by the Baltsudoproekt Central Design Bureau built for the Russian Navy, intended to be used for training of deck-based naval helicopter crews. The ship is reportedly a new addition to the Black Sea Fleet designed to operate in the Sea of Azov.

== Ships ==
Name	Builder	Laid down	Launched	Commissioned	Fleet	Status
Nikolai Kamov	JSC Shiprepair & Shipbuilding Corporation	28 June 2018	26 April 2024	September 2025	Black Sea Fleet	Delivered to the Black Sea Fleet as of 2025

== See also ==
- List of active Russian Navy ships
- Future of the Russian Navy
