= Belokhvostikov =

Belokhvostikov (Russian: Белохвостиков) is a Russian masculine surname originating from belyi khvostik meaning a little white tail; its feminine counterpart is Belokhvostikova. The surname may refer to

- Evgeny Belokhvostikov (born 1992), Russian ice hockey defenceman
- Natalya Belokhvostikova (born 1951), Russian actress
