= Chkalovsk, Russia =

Town in Nizhny Novgorod Oblast, Russia

Chkalovsk Чкаловск
- Town
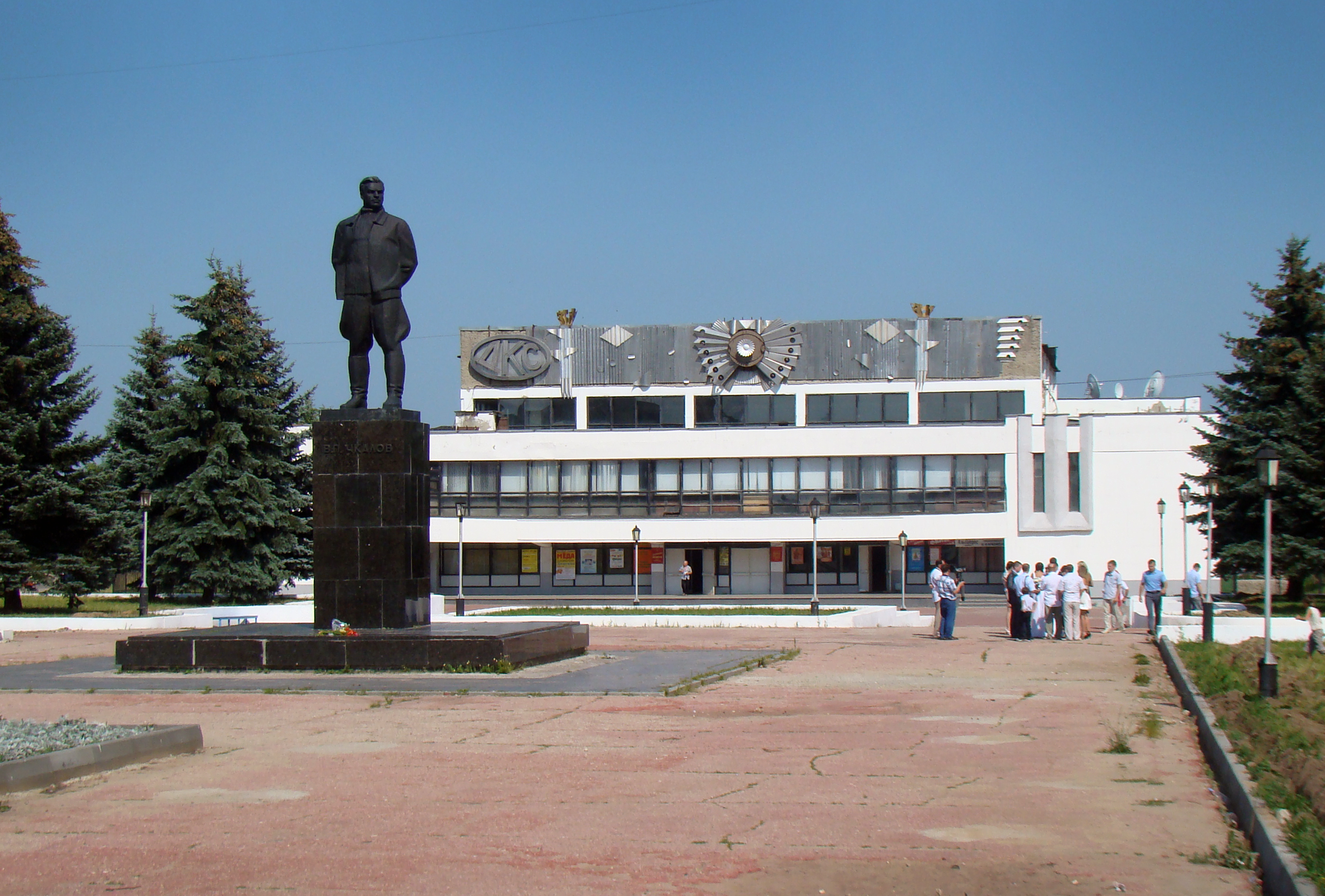
- Monument to Valery Chkalov in front of the Palace of Culture and Sports

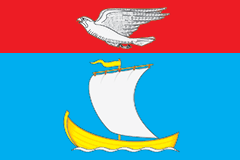
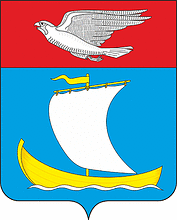
- Flag Coat of arms
- Interactive map of Chkalovsk
- Location of Chkalovsk Chkalovsk (Nizhny Novgorod Oblast)
- Coordinates: 56°46′N 43°14′E
- Country: Russia
- Federal subject: Nizhny Novgorod Oblast
- Known since: 12th century
- Town status since: 1955
- Elevation: 100 m (330 ft)

Population (2010 Census)
  - Total: 12,368
  - Estimate (2021): 11,535 (−6.7%)

Administrative status
  - Subordinated to: town of oblast significance of Chkalovsk
  - Capital of: town of oblast significance of Chkalovsk

Municipal status
  - Urban okrug: Chkalovsk Urban Okrug
  - Capital of: Chkalovsk Urban Okrug
- Time zone: UTC+3 (MSK)
- Postal codes: 606540, 606541, 606558
- OKTMO ID: 22755000001
- Website: gorodchkalovsk.ru

Chkalovsk population
- 2010 Census: 12,368
- 2002 Census: 13,856
- 1989 Census: 15,059
- 1979 Census: 14,581

Chkalovsk (Russian: Чка́ловск) is a town in Nizhny Novgorod Oblast, Russia, located on the right bank of the Volga River, 95 kilometers (59 mi) northwest of Nizhny Novgorod, the administrative center of the oblast. As of the 2010 Census, its population was 12,368.

It was previously known as Vasilyeva Sloboda/Vasilyovo (until 1938). It was renamed after its most famous inhabitant, Valeri Chkalov, a test pilot awarded the title Hero of the Soviet Union (1936).

== History ==
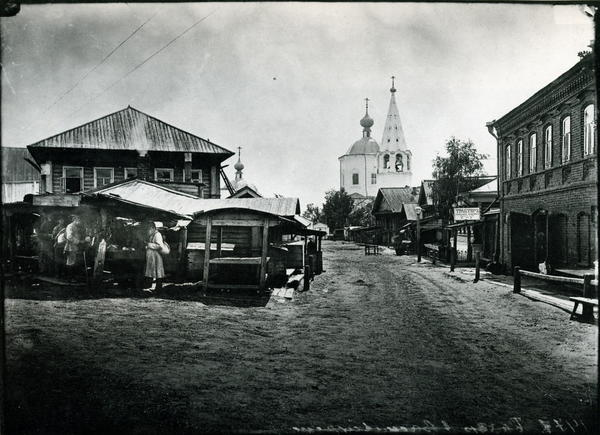
Vasilyeva Sloboda in the early 20th century

It has been known since the 12th century as Vasilyeva Sloboda, named so in honor of its founder Prince Vasily Yuryevich, the son of Yury Dolgoruky. For a long time the territory belonged to Prince Shuysky who eventually became Tsar Vasily Shuysky.

The famous Russian pilot Valery Chkalov was born in 1904 in Vasilyovo. In 1937, Vasilyovo was renamed Chkalovsk after him and in 1955 it was granted town status. Most of the original village was flooded by the Gorky Reservoir after the construction of Gorky Hydroelectric Station in 1955.

== Administrative and municipal status ==
Within the framework of administrative divisions, it is, together with 228 rural localities, incorporated as the town of oblast significance of Chkalovsk—an administrative unit with the status equal to that of the districts. As a municipal division, the town of oblast significance of Chkalovsk is incorporated as Chkalovsk Urban Okrug.

Until May 2015, the town served as the administrative center of Chkalovsky District and, within the framework of administrative divisions, was incorporated within that district as a town of district significance. As a municipal division, it was incorporated as Chkalovsk Urban Settlement within Chkalovsky Municipal District.
