= Gorodets painting =

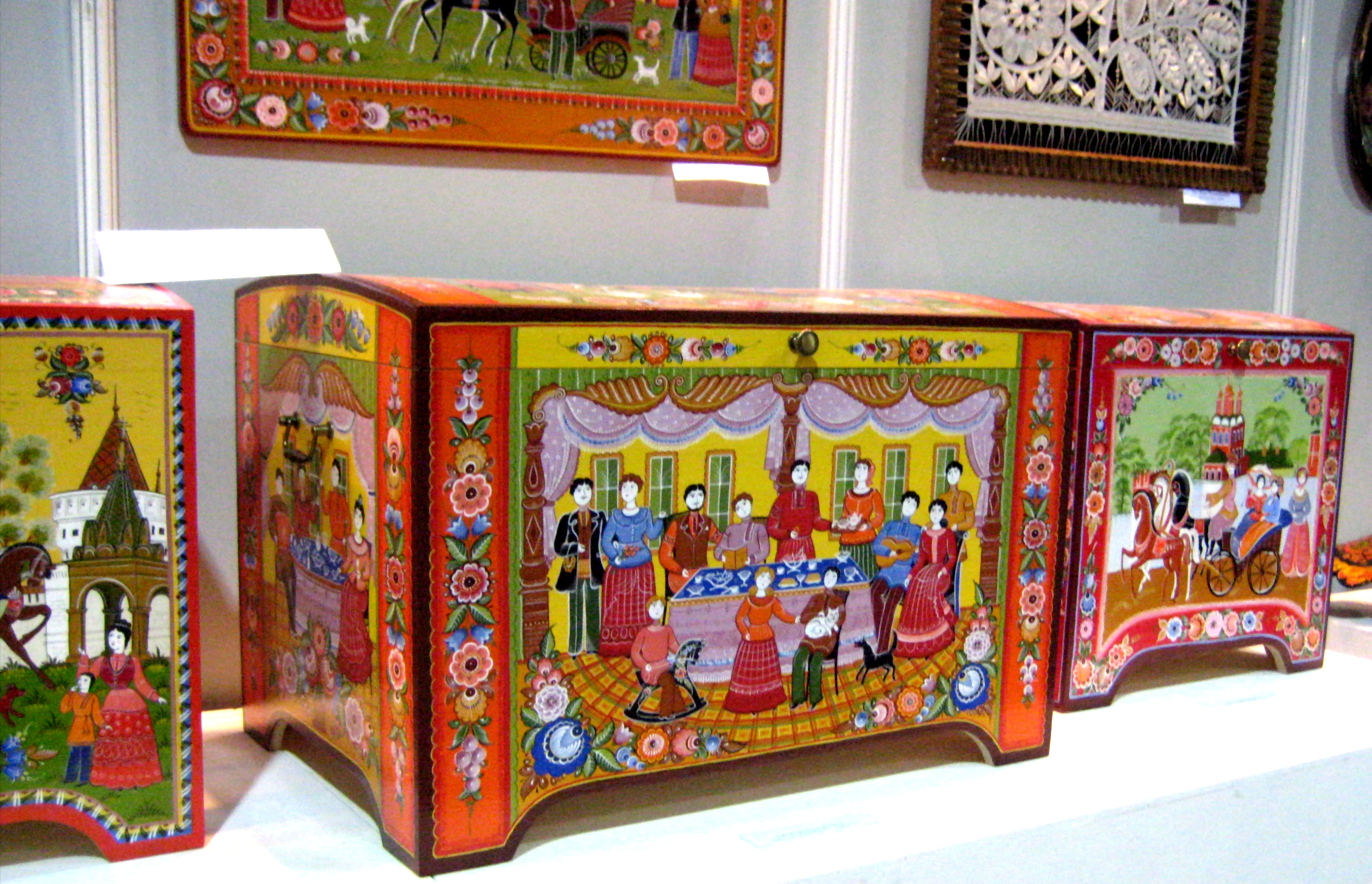
Gorodets painted caskets

Gorodets painting (Russian:Городецкая роспись) is a Russian handicraft and folk art painting technique. It is a so-called "naive art".

== History ==
This style of painting was popularized in the later half of the 19th century. It is different from Khokhloma folk painting but holds some common traits, they are both very colorful and bright. Gorodets painting sprang from carved Gorodets distaffs that were manufactured in villages nearby the town of Gorodets in the Nizhni Novgorod Region. Initially Gorodets craftsmen used the incrustation technique to ornament the distaffs, and by the mid 19th century saw the transition from incrustation to painting of Distaff.

Gorodets artists traditionally have painted genre scenes (including merrymaking, tea drinking, the famous Gorodets horse with a horseman, and folk festivities), decorative images of birds and animals (including roosters, horses, lions, and leopards), and flower patterns. Nowadays Gorodets craftsmen use similar imagery and motifs in their works. These are decorative panels, caskets, boxes, various sets of kitchen stuff, such as hardboards, bread bins, saltcellars, children furniture and toys, including the most popular the painted rocking horse.

The factory 'Gorodets Painting' has existed since 1965, and has an experimental laboratory where new motifs are devised, along with preserving the artistic tradition and style.
