= Prokhor of Gorodets =

Prokhor of Gorodets (Прохор, Прохор с Городца in Russian) was a medieval Russian icon-painter, thought to have been the teacher of Andrei Rublev.

Together with Rublev and Theophanes the Greek, Prokhor painted a number of frescos in the old Cathedral of the Annunciation in the Moscow Kremlin in 1405 (the cathedral was rebuilt in 1416). Russian historians attribute a number of icons in the iconostasis of this cathedral to Prokhor, including "Crucifixion", "Ascension" and "Assumption", which can still be found in today's Cathedral of the Annunciation.
