= Bells from the Deep =

1993 film by Werner Herzog

- Directed by: Werner Herzog
- Written by: Werner Herzog
- Produced by: Lucki Stipetic; Ira Barmak; Alessandro Cecconi
- Starring: Anna Hitch
- Narrated by: Werner Herzog
- Cinematography: Jörg Schmidt-Reitwein
- Edited by: Rainer Standke
- Production companies: Werner Herzog Filmproduktion; Momentous Events (co-production)
- Release date: 1993
- Running time: 60 minutes
- Countries: Germany; United States
- Languages: English; German; Russian

Bells from the Deep: Faith and Superstition in Russia is a 1993 documentary film written and directed by Werner Herzog, produced by Werner Herzog Filmproduktion.

== Summary ==
Bells from the Deep is German director Werner Herzog's documentary investigation of Russian mysticism. The first half of the film is concerned primarily with Vissarion, a Russian faith healer claiming to be the reincarnation of God as was Jesus. Herzog uses primarily interviews with Russians and scenes from the religious services of the two holy men. Herzog also has several segments on the religion of Siberian nomads.

The second half of the film is primarily concerned with the legend of the lost city of Kitezh. This myth is about a city that was in peril of being destroyed by marauding Mongols, but whose citizens prayed for rescue. Hearing their prayers, God placed the city at the bottom of a deep lake, where it resides to this day. Some even say that one can hear the bells from the city's church. The story is recounted by a local priest and pilgrims visiting the lake.

Towards the end of the film, Vissarion blesses the viewers of the film.

== Embellishments ==
Herzog, as he often does, embellished the story of the Lost City considerably, acknowledging his fabrications fully:

"I wanted to get shots of pilgrims crawling around on the ice trying to catch a glimpse of the lost city, but as there were no pilgrims around I hired two drunks from the next town and put them on the ice. One of them has his face right on the ice and looks like he is in very deep meditation. The accountant’s truth: he was completely drunk and fell asleep, and we had to wake him at the end of the take."

Herzog defends the fabrication as reaching a greater truth:

"I think the scene explains the fate and soul of Russia more than anything else."

This is in keeping with Herzog's beliefs about truth in film.

The film also contains shots of pilgrims, which are in fact people ice fishing. The chanting Siberians are only performing religious services in one of their two major scenes. In the other they are simply singing a love song.
