= Artyom Kavinov =

Russian politician

- Артём Кавинов
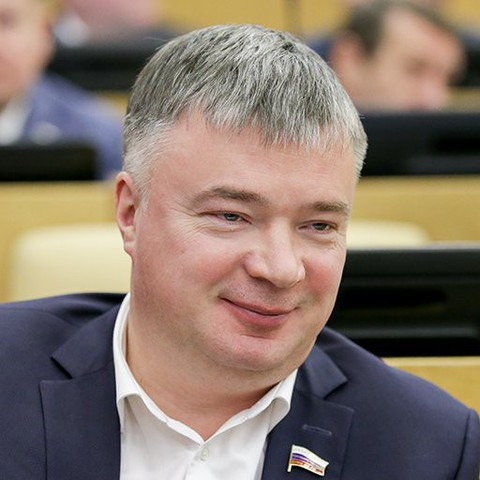

Member of the State Duma for Nizhny Novgorod Oblast
- Incumbent
- Assumed office 5 October 2016
- Preceded by: constituency re-established
- Constituency: Bor (No. 133)

Personal details
- Born: 3 September 1969 (age 57) Gorky, Russian SFSR, USSR
- Party: United Russia
- Education: N. I. Lobachevsky State University of Nizhny Novgorod

Artyom Alexandrovich Kavinov (Russian: Артём Александрович Кавинов; born 3 September 1969, Gorky) is a Russian political figure and deputy of the 8th State Duma. In 2005, he was awarded a Candidate of Sciences in Economics degree.

He began his career in civil service back in 1994 when he started working at the Regional Center for Youth Initiatives of the Department of Education and Science of the Administration of Nizhny Novgorod Oblast. From 2001 to 2004, he was first deputy head of the administration of the Kstovsky District of Nizhny Novgorod Oblast. Up until 2009, he worked as the head of the Department for Public Relations of the Office of the Governor of Nizhny Novgorod Oblast and as deputy chief of staff. From 2009 to 2011, he was the First Deputy Ministry of Internal Affairs of Russia for the Nizhny Novgorod Oblast. In March 2011, he was elected deputy of the Legislative Assembly of Nizhny Novgorod Oblast. From 2014 to 2016, he was the minister of social affairs of the Nizhny Novgorod Oblast. He left the post to become the deputy of the 7th State Duma from the Nizhny Novgorod Oblast constituency. Since September 2021, he has served as deputy of the 8th State Duma.

== Sanctions ==
He was sanctioned by the UK government in 2022 in relation to the Russo-Ukrainian War.

== Family ==
Married.

== Income and property ==
In 2021, he declared an income of 7,408,274.39 rubles. He owns four land plots, five apartments, and other assets.
