= Nizhny Novgorod Hydroelectric Station =

Coordinates: 56.650187°N 43.428955°E

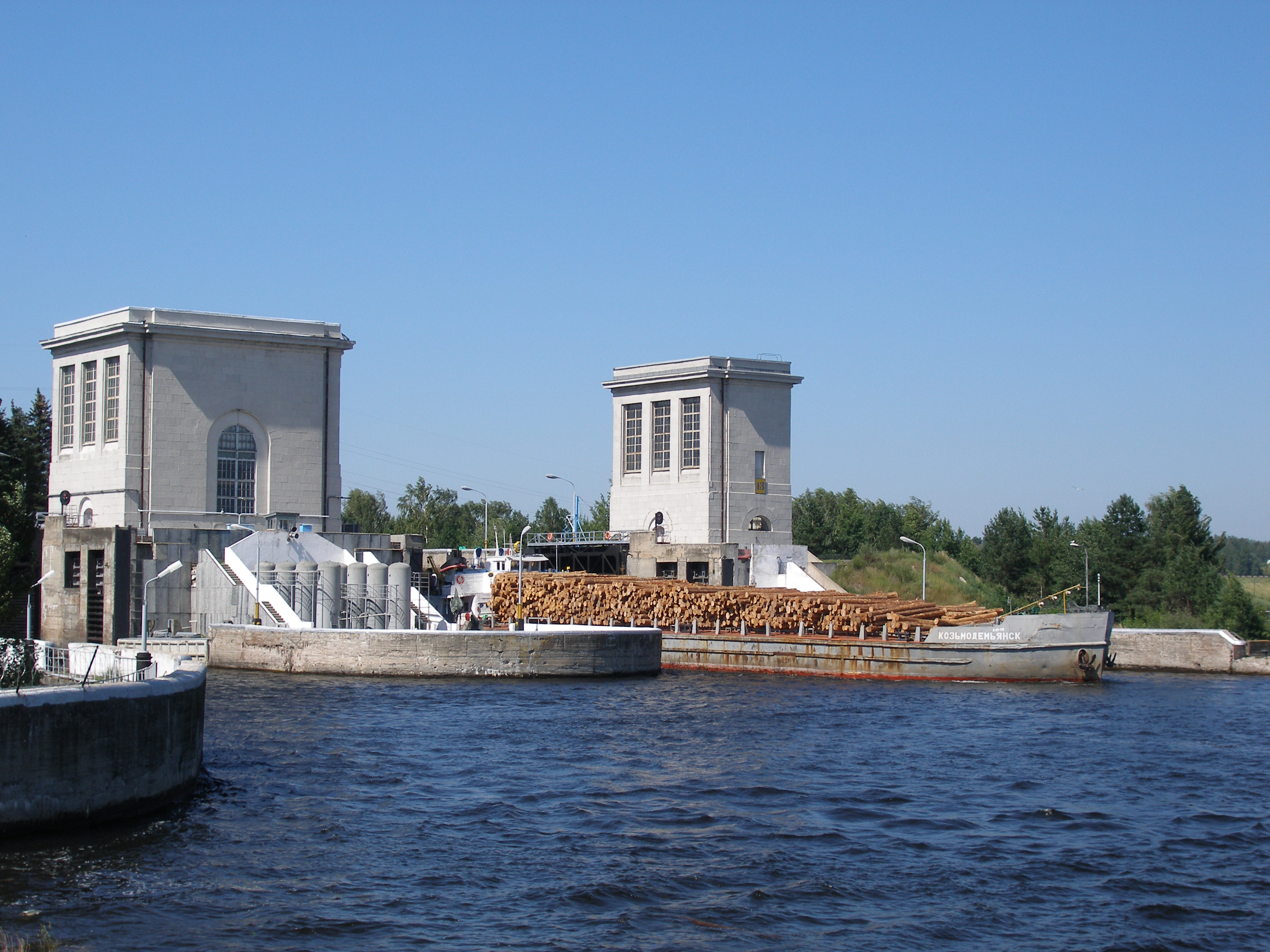
The ship locks of the Nizhny Novgorod Hydroelectric Station

The Nizhny Novgorod Hydroelectric Station or Nizhny Novgorod GES (Russian: Нижегоро́дская ГЭС) is a hydroelectric station on the Volga river. Located near Zavolzhye, Nizhny Novgorod Oblast, it belongs to the Volga-Kama Cascade of dams.

== Technical data ==
Construction started in 1948 and was completed in 1959. Complex consists of concrete spillway dam, 7 earth-fill dams and 3 dikes total 18.6 km long and up to 40 m high, power plant house, and two single-chamber two-lane locks with an intermediate pond. Installed power is 530.5 MW, average annual production is 1510 GWh. The power house has 8 generator units with Kaplan turbines at 17 m head. 6 units of 65 MW, one of 68 MW and one of 72.5 MW. The dam with total waterfront length of 13 km forms Gorky Reservoir.

== History ==
Construction began in 1948. Although it was a medium-size project, e.g. compared to Volga Hydroelectric Station, it was often called an 'innovation testing range'. It also was the USSR's longest dam.

More than 15,000 people came to the construction site. Construction site's infrastructure has been built along with construction of the station. Many industries of Zavolzhye and Gorodets owe their existence to the station's construction. Zavolzhye town was built from scratch. 8,500 houses and 700 state-owned and public buildings were moved to Zavolzhye and Gorodets from villages that were to be flooded.

The first concrete pouring for the dam took place in April 1951. The river current was stopped on August 24, 1955. November 2, 1955, when the first turbine was put under load, is the station's official launch date. The last of the eight turbines was run in December 1956. In 1959, the generators' cooling system improvement and reinforcement of turbines were implemented, increasing installed power by 120 MW, to 520 MW.
