= Shakhunya =

Town in Nizhny Novgorod Oblast, Russia

Shakhunya Шахунья
- Town
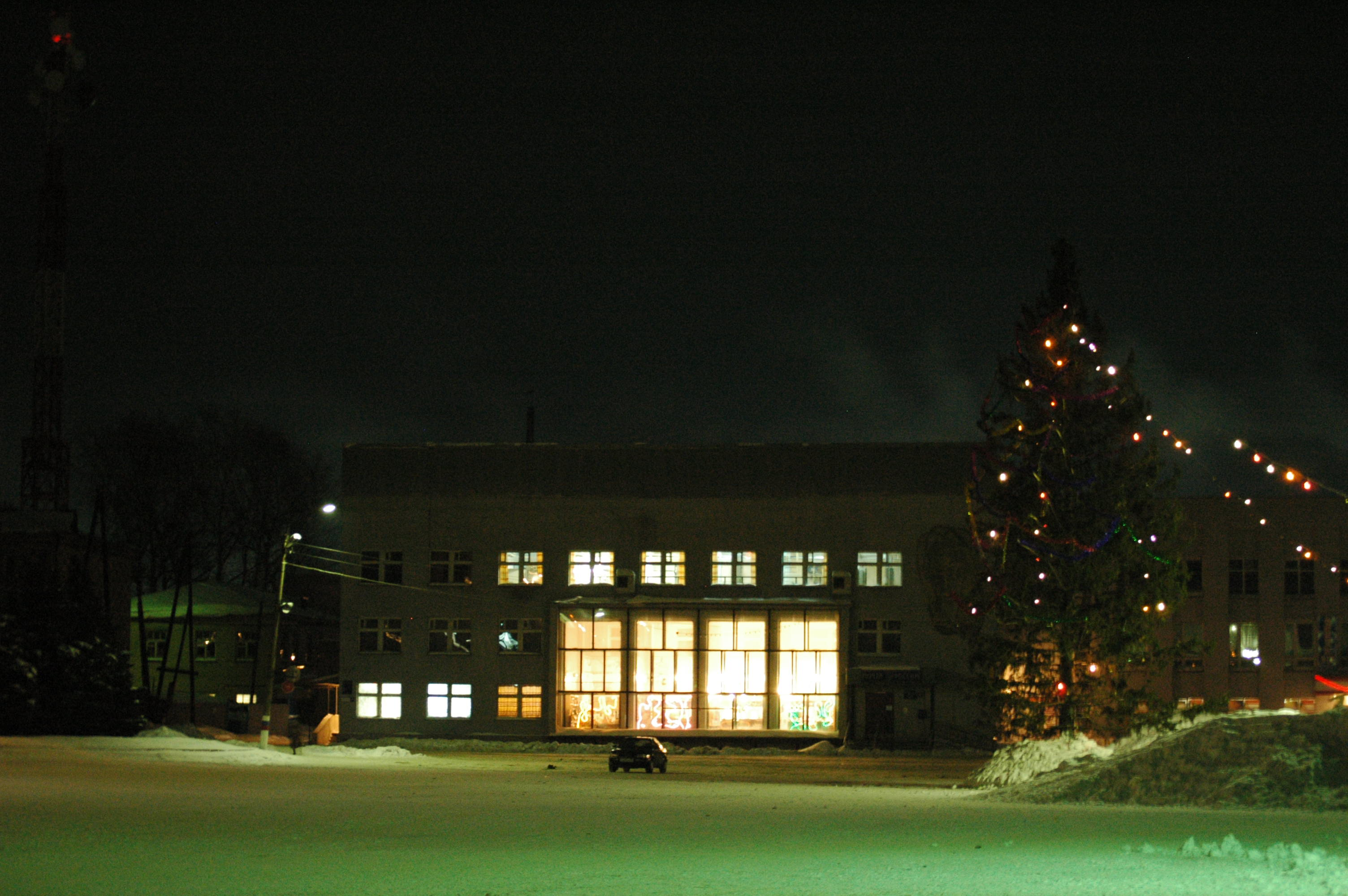
- Post office in Shakhunya

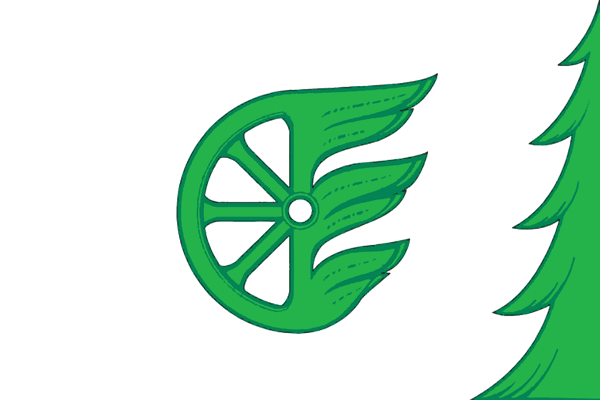
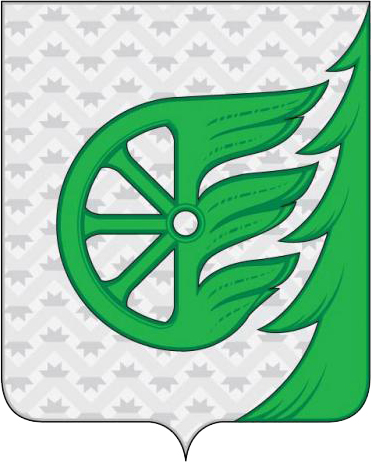
- Flag Coat of arms
- Interactive map of Shakhunya
- Location of Shakhunya Shakhunya (Nizhny Novgorod Oblast)
- Coordinates: 57°40′N 46°37′E
- Country: Russia
- Federal subject: Nizhny Novgorod Oblast
- Founded: 1927
- Town status since: 1943
- Elevation: 152.2 m (499 ft)

Population (2010 Census)
  - Total: 20,921
  - Estimate (2021): 17,626 (−15.7%)

Administrative status
  - Subordinated to: town of oblast significance of Shakhunya
  - Capital of: town of oblast significance of Shakhunya

Municipal status
  - Urban okrug: Shakhunya Urban Okrug
  - Capital of: Shakhunya Urban Okrug
- Time zone: UTC+3 (MSK)
- Postal code: 606910
- OKTMO ID: 22758000001

Shakhunya (Russian: Шаху́нья) is a town in Nizhny Novgorod Oblast, Russia, located on the Nizhny Novgorod–Kirov railway, 240 kilometers (150 mi) northeast of Nizhny Novgorod. Population: 20,921 (2010 census); 21,724 (2002 census); 22,337 (1989 Soviet census).

== History ==
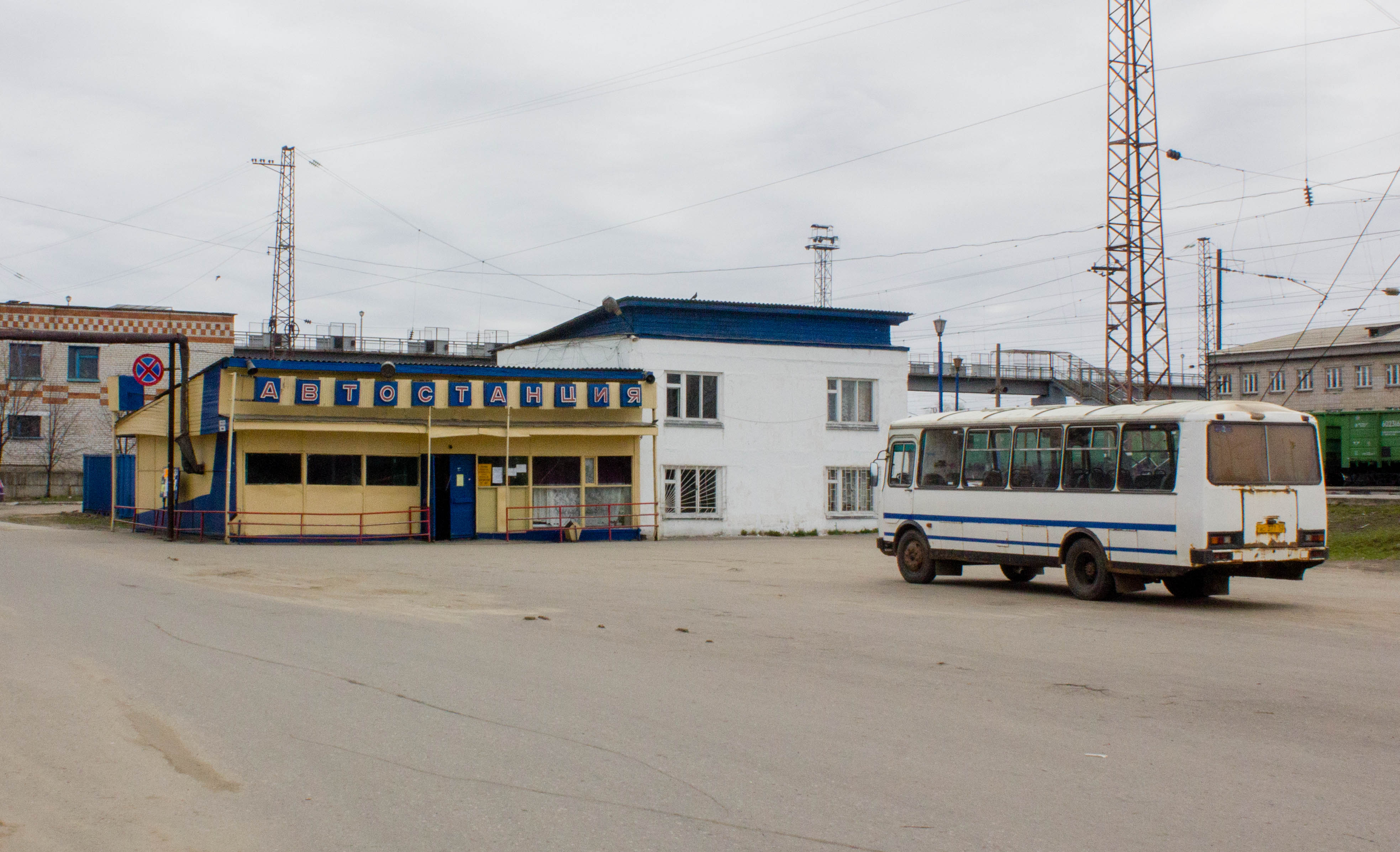
A bus station in Shakhunya

It was founded as a settlement around the Shakhunya railway station, which was opened in 1927. It was granted work settlement status in 1938 and town status in 1943.

== Administrative and municipal status ==
Within the framework of administrative divisions, it is, together with 2 work settlements and 136 rural localities, incorporated as the town of oblast significance of Shakhunya—an administrative unit with the status equal to that of the districts. As a municipal division, the town of oblast significance of Shakhunya is incorporated as Shakhunya Urban Okrug.
