= Pavel Ivanovich Melnikov =

Russian writer (1818–1883)

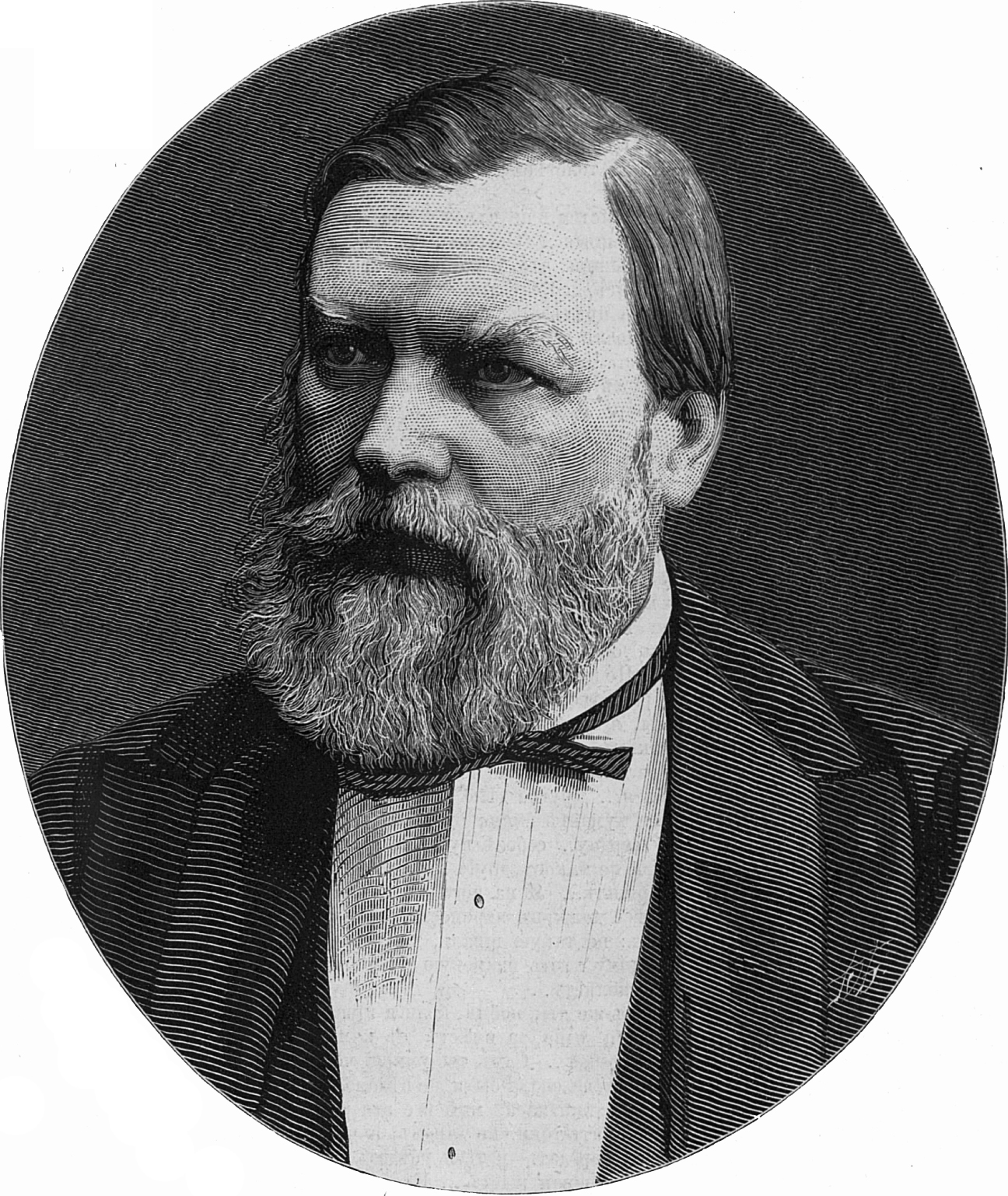
- Portrait by Pyotr Borel
- Born: November 6, 1818; Nizhny Novgorod, Russian Empire
- Died: February 13, 1883 (aged 64); Nizhny Novgorod, Russian Empire
- Education: Kazan University
- Writing career
- Pen name: Andrey Pechersky

Signature
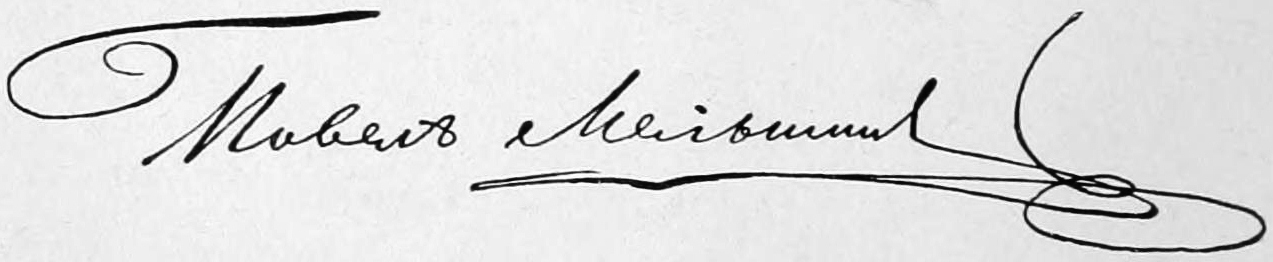

Pavel Ivanovich Melnikov (alias Andrey Pechersky, Russian: Па́вел Ива́нович Ме́льников (Андре́й Пече́рский), 1818, Nizhny Novgorod – 1883) was a Russian writer, best known for his novels In the Forests and On the Hills, which describe the unique life of Transvolga and use its dialects.

== Biography ==
Pavel Ivanovich Melnikov was born in Nizhny Novgorod to a noble family of moderate means and spent his early years in Semyonov, a small provincial town. His childhood impressions, pictures of Transvolga, its common people's ways of life had a strong impact upon his later worldview.

In 1834 he enrolled at the Kazan University's philological faculty and graduated in 1837. As a student he became interested in the works of Alexander Pushkin and Nikolai Gogol, as well as Vissarion Belinsky's critical essays. Melnikov was about to embark upon the academic career at the university when for some kind of wrongdoing (the nature of which remains unknown) he was deported to Perm to start work there as a teacher of history and statistics. In 1838 he was transferred to Nizhny where he spent the major part of his life. From his teens, Melnikov's major interests were the economics and history of Russia.

As a writer, Melnikov debuted in 1839 in Otechestvennye Zapiski with the series of sketches called From Tambov Governorate to Siberia: The Traveller's Notes. But his first stab at fiction, a short story "About Who Epidor Perfilievich Was and Which Preparation Were Taken for his Birthday", published by Literaturnaya Gazeta in 1840, proved to be a failure; critics dismissed it as a poor imitation of Gogol. Dismayed, Melnikov stopped writing fiction for the next 12 years.

In 1841 Pavel Melnikov became the associate member of the Russian Archeological society. In 1840-1850 he edited The Nizhny Novgorod Government News (the non-official section of it) where he often published historical and ethnographical materials which he had collected. In 1847 he became the Governor of Nizhny Novgorod's special envoy, then moved to the Russian Interior Ministry to supervise the issues dealing with the Raskol. An 'administrative Don Quixote', as was known, treated his mission with extraordinary zeal which vexed his seniors and got him a bad name in the city. Melnikov became notorious as a cruel destroyer of Old Believers' sketes and made way into Raskolniki's folklore. According to songs and legends about him, Melnikov had sold his soul to the Devil to obtain a special gift of "seeing through walls."

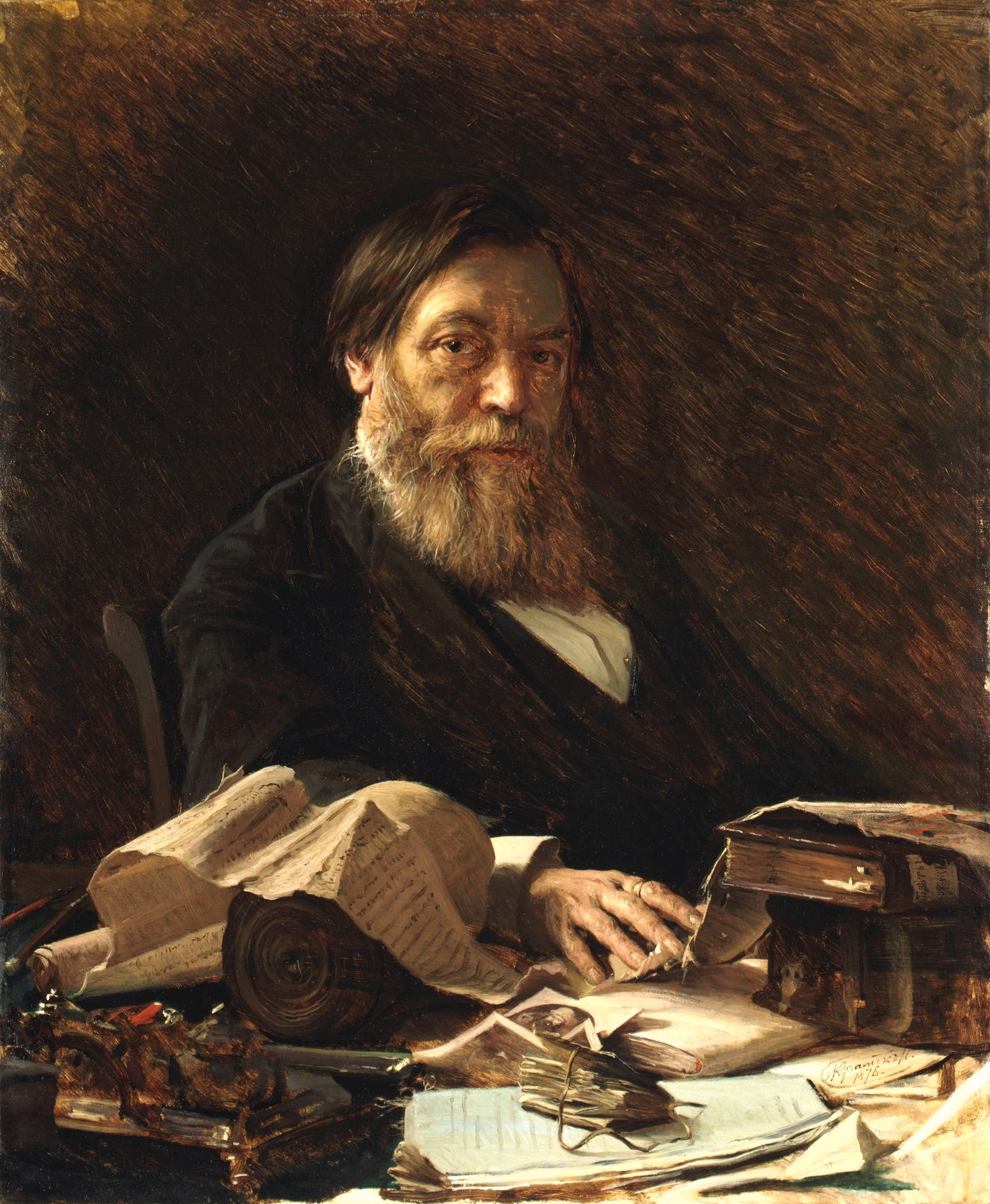
Portrait by Ivan Kramskoy.

Later, having studied the history of Raskol, he changed his attitude. In his special "Report on the Current Situation in Raskol" (1854) Melnikov argued that the low level of morality among the Orthodox church officials was to blame. After the death of Tsar Nikolai I he was one of the first to demand the maintenance of religious tolerance in Russia ("The Note on Russian Raskol", a report for Grand Duke Konstantin, 1857; "Letters On Raskol", 1862). In 1862 he declared that the 200 years of Old Believers' persecution was unnecessary and wrong. Melnikov was a liberal, calling for reforms and enlightenment of the people. He remained sceptical of the revolutionary movement's true aims but greatly respected Alexander Hertzen.

Following his close friend Vladimir Dal's advice, Melnikov resumed writing and in 1852 published the short story "Krasilnikovy" in Moskvityanin. This and other stories and novelettes that followed (to be published mostly in Russky Vestnik) targeted social and domestic despotism, all-pervading corruption and serfdom. Close to the natural school, they were praised by Russian radical critics of the time. Nikolai Chernyshevsky called Melnikov "one of our most gifted storytellers" and compared him with Saltykov-Schedrin in terms of having "word's denuniciation power." Nikolai Dobrolyubov too mentioned Melnikov alongside Saltykov-Schedrin as one of the Russia's two most prominent satirists of the 1850s. In 1858 the collection of stories by Pavel Melnikov was banned by censorship.

In 1861 the novel Grisha was published; seen as weaker than previous ones, it contained nevertheless interesting Old Believers' characters. Modest Musorgsky saw one of those, Varlaam, as similar to Pushkin's character of the same name from Boris Godunov, and merged the two, in his opera Boris Godunov, using also the song "As in the city of Kazan", from Grisha novel.

In 1866 Melnikov retired, moved to Moscow and devoted all of his time to literature, using the pseudonym Andrey Pechersky, contributing mostly to Russky Vestnik. Much of this output was motivated by financial issues: his large family relied on the money he earned by writing as their only source of income. His literary friendships were few: Alexei Pisemsky, Apollon Maykov, Konstantin Bestuzhev-Ryumin. He knew well Nikolai Nekrasov, but disliked him. For the last ten years of his life Melnikov lived in Nizhny Novgorod, spending summers on his estate. During his Moscow period Melnikov-Pechersky wrote several historical works (among them "Princess Tarakanova and the Princess of Vladimir", 1867) and started what proved to be his magnum opus, the dilogy In the Forests (1871–1874) and On the Hills (1875–1881). He dictated the last chapters of the latter to his wife while terminally ill.

=== Legacy ===
Both In the Forests and On the Hills were immensely popular. Pavel Tretyakov himself commissioned Ivan Kramskoi to paint the author. Maxim Gorky called On the Hills "the glorious poem of Russia" and urged young authors to take lessons from Melnikov-Pechersky and Nikolai Leskov, learning from them "the clarity and richness of language." Melnikov-Pechersky's two novels greatly influenced Vladimir Korolenko and especially Pavel Bazhov. It was Melnikov-Pechersky's dilogy that inspired Mikhail Nesterov to create pictures like "In the Woods", "On the Hills", "Nightingale Sings" and "Beyond the Volga". Rimsky-Korsakov was writing his opera The Legend of the Invisible City of Kitezh and the Maiden Fevroniya much under the impression of In the Forests novel.
