= In the Forests =

1874 novel by Pavel Melnikov-Pechersky

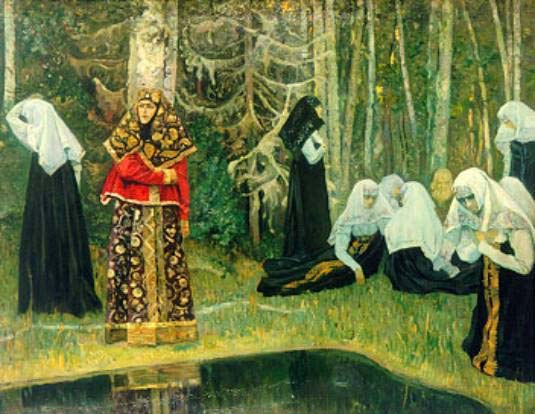
- Author: Pavel Melnikov-Pechersky
- Original title: В лесах
- Language: Russian
- Publication date: 1874
- Publication place: Imperial Russia
- Media type: Print (hardback & paperback)
- Followed by: On the Hills

In the Forests (Russian: В лесах, romanized: V lesakh) is an 1874 novel by Pavel Melnikov-Pechersky, first part of a dilogy, completed in 1881 by the novel On the Hills.

Providing panoramic view on the life of the Old Believers in the mid-19th century Zavolzhye and telling the stories of several local merchant families during the first decade of the rise of capitalism in Russia, the novel became immensely popular in its time. It was praised for, among other things, its colourful language, dipping deep into Russian folklore, its styles and imagery.

Among the authors who spoke of their indebtedness to Melnikov's two major novels were Vladimir Korolenko and, in particular, Pavel Bazhov. It was Melnikov-Pechersky's dilogy that inspired Mikhail Nesterov's eponymous "In the Woods" and "On the Hills" (as well as "Nightingale Sings" and "Beyond the Volga"). Vladimir Belsky, a librettist for Rimsky-Korsakov's The Legend of the Invisible City of Kitezh and the Maiden Fevroniya, used In the Forests as one of his sources.
