= Evgeny Belokhvostikov =

Russian ice hockey player (born 1992)

- Born: February 1, 1992 (age 33) Zavolzhie, Russia
- Height: 6 ft 3 in (191 cm)
- Weight: 205 lb (93 kg; 14 st 9 lb)
- Position: Defence
- Shoots: Left
- VHL team Former teams: HC Sarov; Torpedo Nizhny Novgorod; Metallurg Novokuznetsk; HC Lada Togliatti
- NHL draft: Undrafted
- Playing career: 2013–present

Evgeny Belokhvostikov (born February 1, 1992) is a Russian ice hockey defenceman. He is currently playing with HC Sarov of the Supreme Hockey League (VHL).

Belokhvostikov made his Kontinental Hockey League debut playing with Torpedo Nizhny Novgorod during the 2013–14 KHL season.
