= Chkalovsky District, Nizhny Novgorod Oblast =

Chkalovsky District Чкаловский район (Russian)
- District
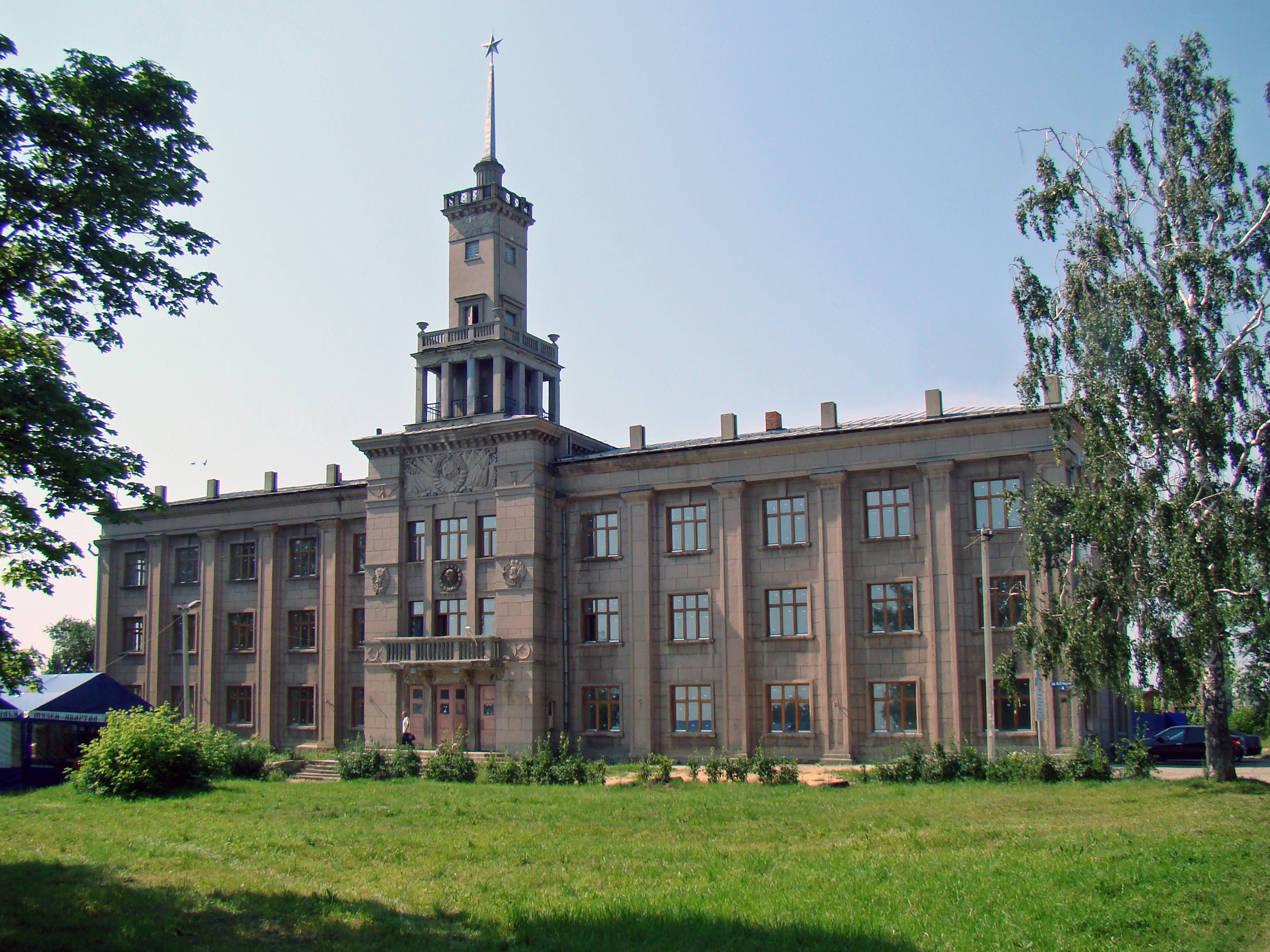
- Valery Chkalov Palace of Culture in Chkalovsk, Chkalovsky District

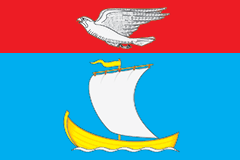
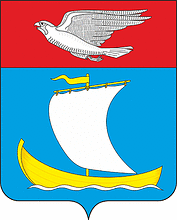
- Flag Coat of arms
- Location of Chkalovsky District in Nizhny Novgorod Oblast
- Coordinates: 56°46′N 43°15′E
- Country: Russia
- Federal subject: Nizhny Novgorod Oblast
- Established: 1936
- Abolished: May 24, 2015
- Administrative center: Chkalovsk

Area
  - Total: 861.5 km^{2} (332.6 sq mi)

Population (2010 Census)
  - Total: 21,963
  - Density: 25.49/km^{2} (66.03/sq mi)
  - Urban: 63.5%
  - Rural: 36.5%

Administrative structure
  - Administrative divisions: 1 Towns of district significance, 8 Selsoviets
  - Inhabited localities: 1 cities/towns, 228 rural localities

Municipal structure
  - Municipally incorporated as: Chkalovsky Municipal District
  - Municipal divisions: 1 urban settlements, 8 rural settlements
- Time zone: UTC+3 (MSK)
- OKTMO ID: 22755000

Population of Chkalovsky District
- 2010 Census: 21,963
- 2002 Census: 25,509
- 1989 Census: 29,881
- 1979 Census: 31,819

Chkalovsky District (Russian: Чка́ловский райо́н) was an administrative and municipal district (raion) in Nizhny Novgorod Oblast, Russia. It was located in the west of the oblast. The area of the district was 861.5 square kilometers (332.6 sq mi). Its administrative center was the town of Chkalovsk. As of the 2010 Census, the total population of the district was 21,963, with the population of Chkalovsk accounting for 56.3% of that number.

== History ==
The district was established in 1936 as Vasilyevsky District (Васильевский район), but was renamed in 1937 in honor of Valery Chkalov. Per Law #67-Z of May 13, 2015, the district was transformed into a town of oblast significance of Chkalovsk. In a similar manner, Law #59-Z of May 8, 2015 abolished Chkalovsky Municipal District and transformed it into Chkalovsk Urban Okrug.

== Administrative and municipal divisions ==
As of May 2015, the district was administratively divided into 1 town of district significance (Chkalovsk) and 8 selsoviets (comprising 228 rural localities). Municipally, Chkalovsky Municipal District was divided into one urban settlement and eight rural settlements.
