= Voskresensky District, Nizhny Novgorod Oblast =

Voskresensky District Воскресенский район (Russian)
- District
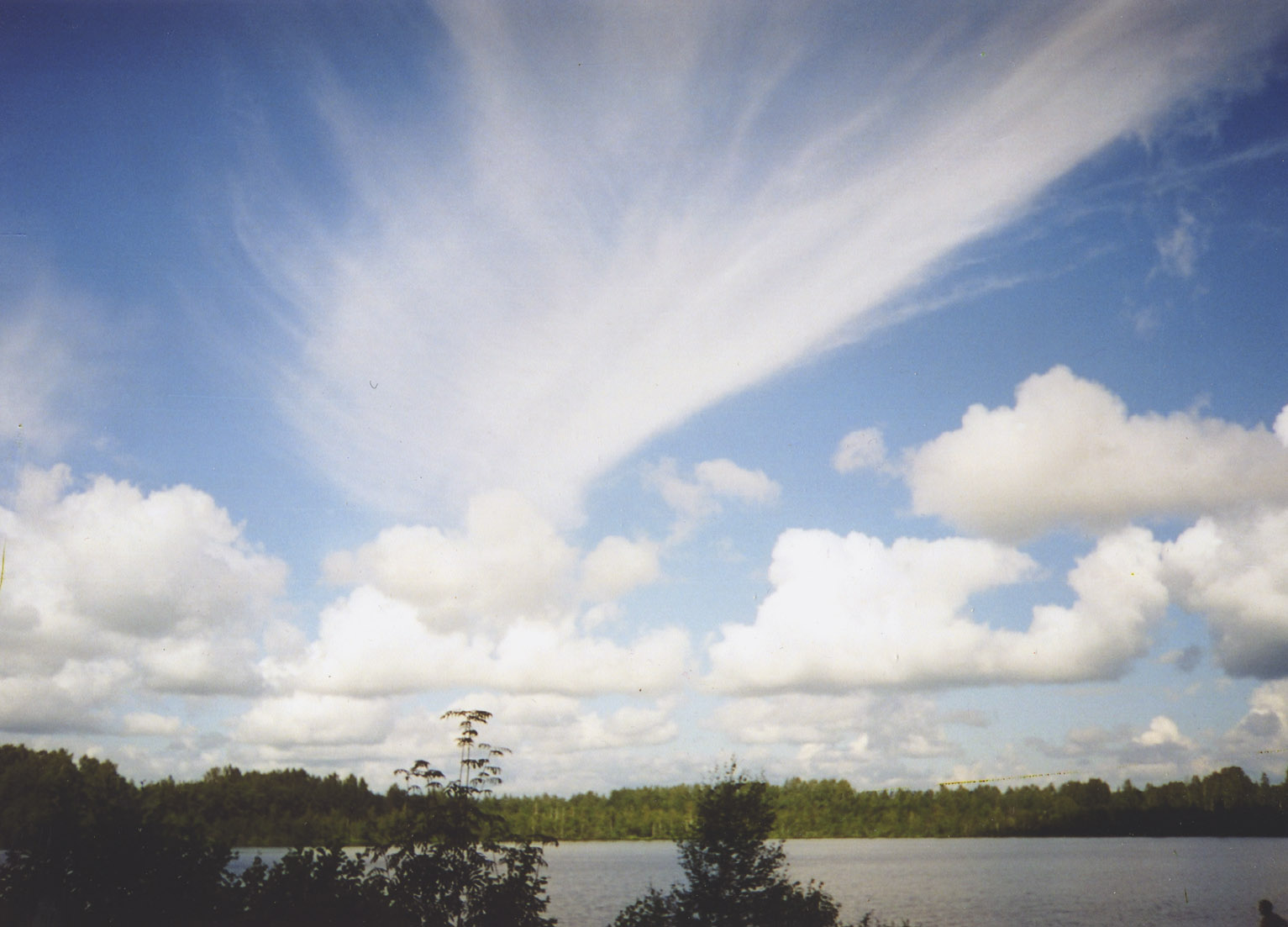
- Lake Svetloyar near the selo of Vladimirskoye in Voskresensky District

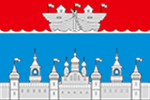
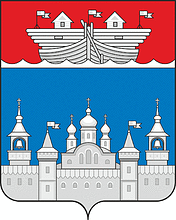
- Flag Coat of arms
- Location of Voskresensky District in Nizhny Novgorod Oblast
- Coordinates: 56°50′N 45°26′E
- Country: Russia
- Federal subject: Nizhny Novgorod Oblast
- Established: 1929
- Administrative center: Voskresenskoye

Area
  - Total: 3,554.5 km^{2} (1,372.4 sq mi)

Population (2010 Census)
  - Total: 21,645
  - Density: 6.0895/km^{2} (15.772/sq mi)
  - Urban: 28.6%
  - Rural: 71.4%

Administrative structure
  - Administrative divisions: 1 Work settlements, 10 Selsoviets
  - Inhabited localities: 1 urban-type settlements, 162 rural localities

Municipal structure
  - Municipally incorporated as: Voskresensky Municipal District
  - Municipal divisions: 1 urban settlements, 10 rural settlements
- Time zone: UTC+3 (MSK)
- OKTMO ID: 22622000
- Website: http://voskresenskoe-adm.ru

Voskresensky District (Russian: Воскресе́нский райо́н) is an administrative district (raion), one of the forty in Nizhny Novgorod Oblast, Russia. Municipally, it is incorporated as Voskresensky Municipal District. It is located in the east of the oblast. The area of the district is 3,554.5 square kilometers (1,372.4 sq mi). Its administrative center is the urban locality (a work settlement) of Voskresenskoye. Population: 21,645 (2010 Census); 25,083 (2002 census); 29,360 (1989 Soviet census). The population of Voskresenskoye accounts for 28.6% of the district's total population.

== History ==
The district was established in 1929.
