= Zavolzhye, Nizhny Novgorod Oblast =

Town in Nizhny Novgorod Oblast, Russia

Zavolzhye Заволжье
- Town
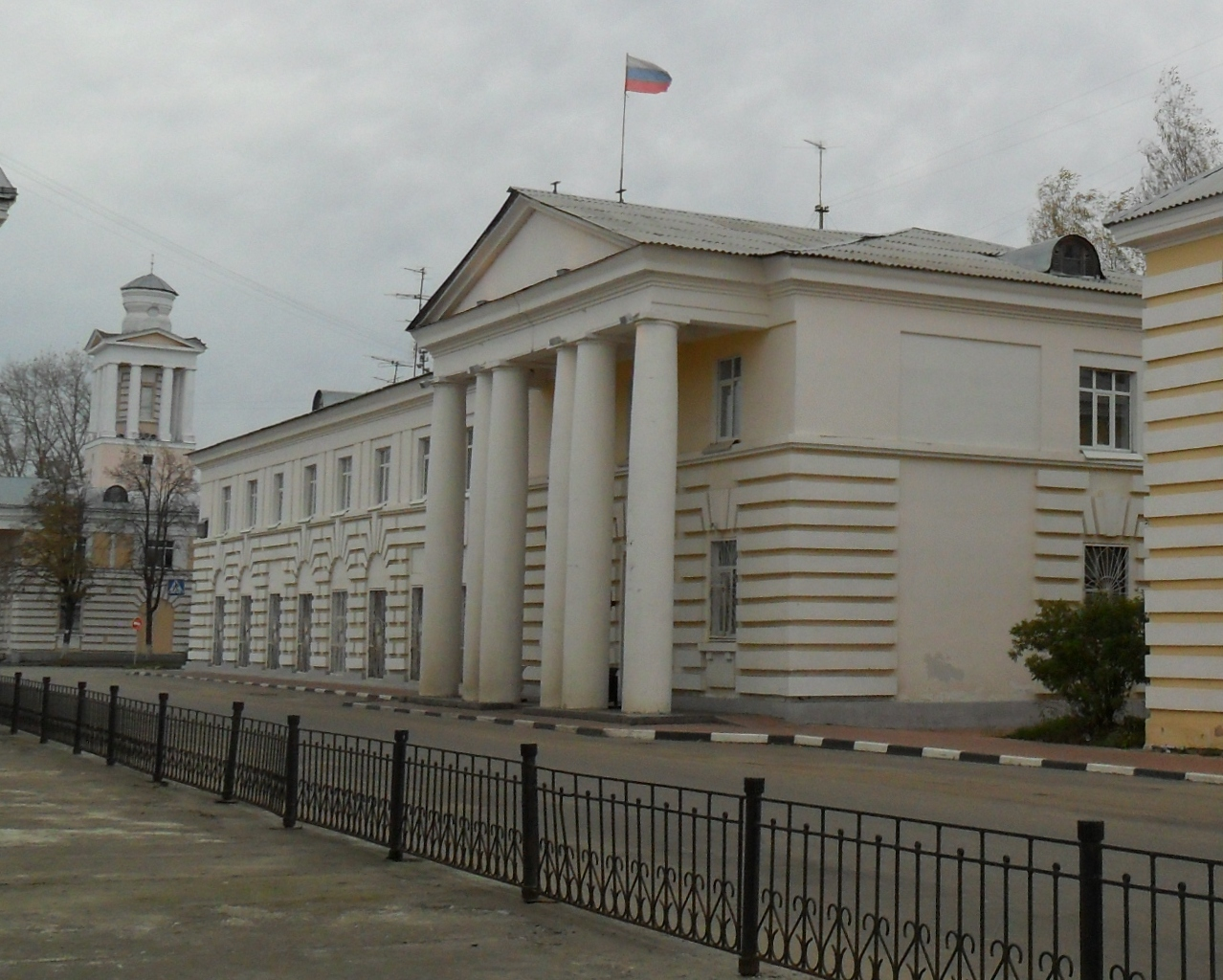
- Zavolzhye Urban Settlement Administration building

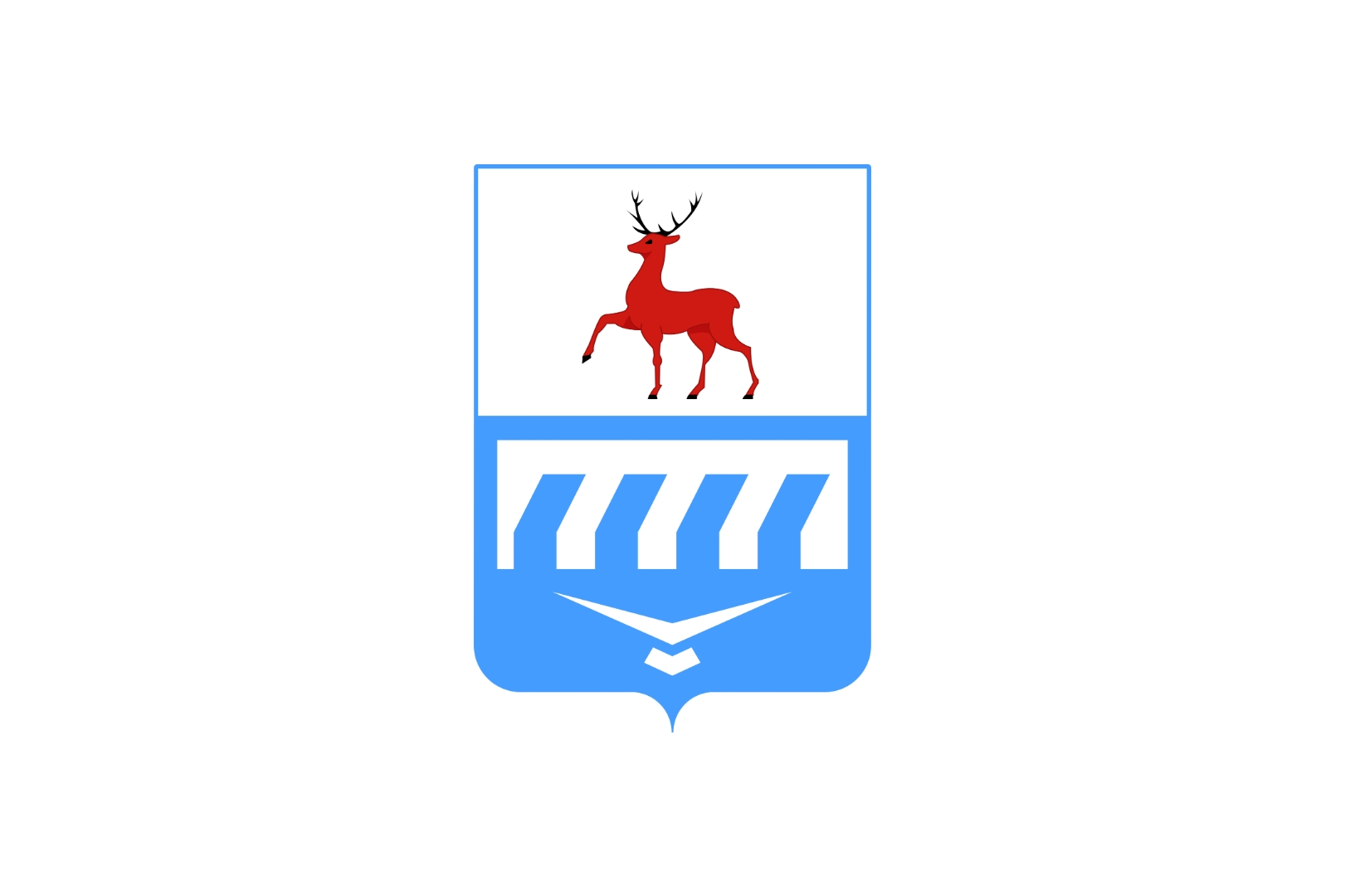
- Flag Coat of arms
- Interactive map of Zavolzhye
- Location of Zavolzhye Zavolzhye (Nizhny Novgorod Oblast)
- Coordinates: 56°39′N 43°24′E
- Country: Russia
- Federal subject: Nizhny Novgorod Oblast
- Administrative district: Gorodetsky District
- Town of district significanceSelsoviet: Zavolzhye
- Founded: 1950
- Town status since: 1964

Population (2010 Census)
  - Total: 40,460
  - Estimate (2025): 35,930 (−11.2%)

Administrative status
  - Capital of: town of district significance of Zavolzhye

Municipal status
  - Municipal district: Gorodetsky Municipal District
  - Urban settlement: Zavolzhye Urban Settlement
  - Capital of: Zavolzhye Urban Settlement
- Time zone: UTC+3 (MSK)
- Postal code: 606520–606525
- OKTMO ID: 22628103001
- Website: zavnnov.ru

Zavolzhye (Russian: Заво́лжье) is a town in Gorodetsky District of Nizhny Novgorod Oblast, Russia, located on the right bank of the Volga River, opposite Gorodets, the administrative centre of the district, and 56 kilometers (35 mi) northwest of Nizhny Novgorod, the administrative center of the oblast. Population: 40,460 (2010 census); 43,971 (2002 census); 44,630 (1989 Soviet census).

== Etymology ==
The name of the town literally means "[the lands] beyond the Volga", i.e., on the river's left bank, since "beyond" here is taken relative to the historically more populated right bank of the river. Thus, Zavolzhye—the region in Nizhny Novgorod Oblast—normally refers to its forested and sparsely populated northeastern half. This makes the name of the town of Zavolzhye somewhat confusing for some people in the region, since the city is located on the right side of the river—it is only "beyond the river" with respect to much older Gorodets.

== History ==
It was founded in 1950 as a settlement serving the construction of the Gorky Hydroelectric Station (now Nizhny Novgorod Hydroelectric Station). It was granted town status in 1964.

== Administrative and municipal status ==
Within the framework of administrative divisions, it is incorporated within Gorodetsky District as the town of district significance of Zavolzhye. As a municipal division, the town of district significance of Zavolzhye is incorporated within Gorodetsky Municipal District as Zavolzhye Urban Settlement.

== Economy ==
Major industrial enterprises in the town include:

- Zavolzhye Motorni Zavod (Zavolzhye Engine Factory, ZMZ)
- Zavolzhsky Plant of crawler tractors (ZZGT)
- Yuta, a furniture factory
- a woodworking factory
- a pharmaceutical packaging glass manufacturing plant, a division of Schott AG (opened in May 2011);
- Ryad, a factory for production of extruded polystyrene foam, insulation

== Transportation ==
The town is the terminus of the electric railroad line from Nizhny Novgorod.

== Notable people ==
- Arina Averina, rhythmic gymnast
- Dina Averina, rhythmic gymnast
- Irina Belova, rhythmic gymnast
- Evgeny Belokhvostikov, professional ice hockey player
