= Gorodetsky District =

Gorodetsky District Городецкий район (Russian)
- District
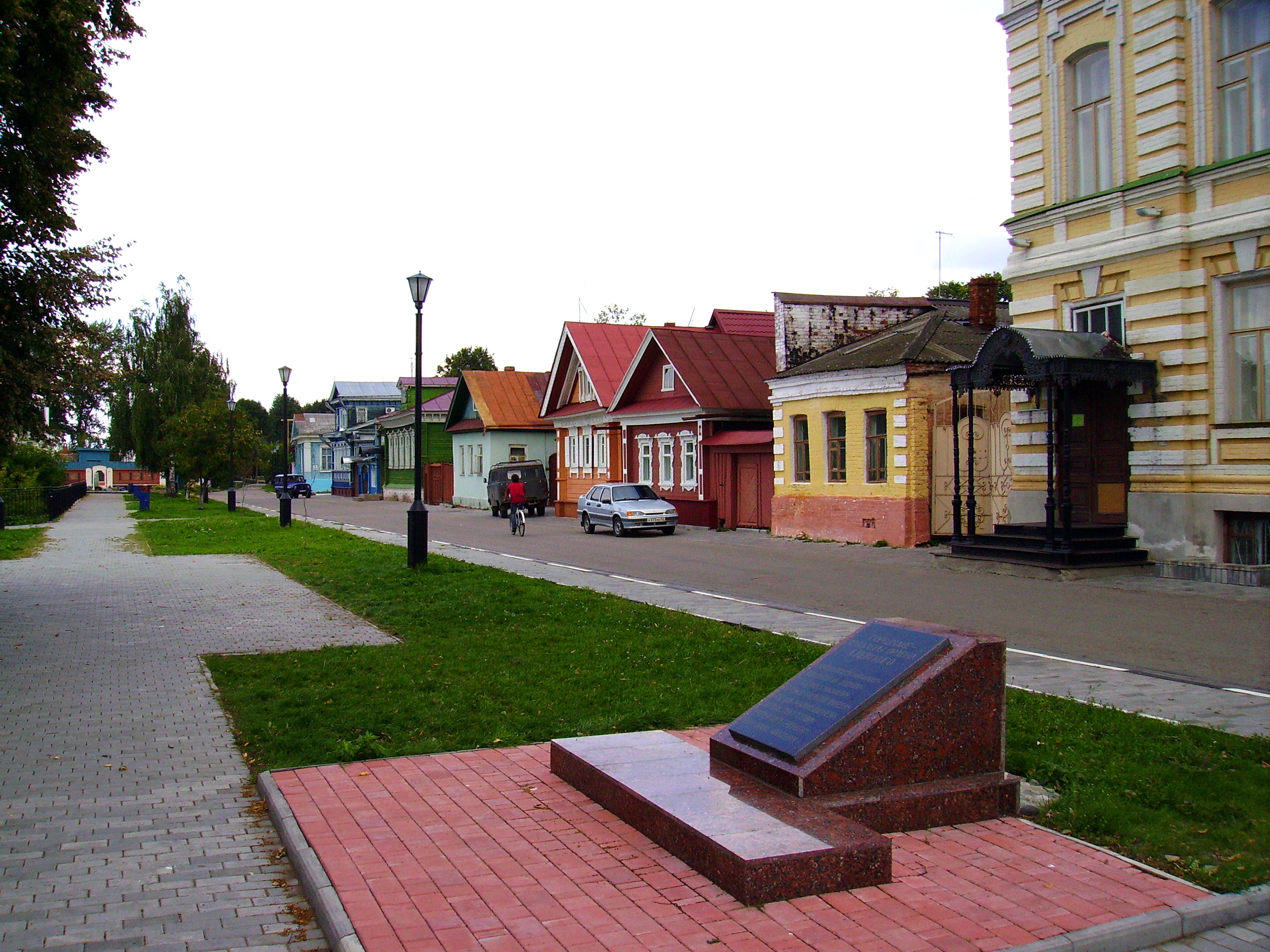
- Gorodets, the administrative center of Gorodetsky District

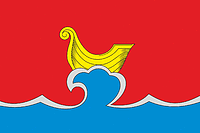
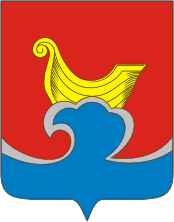
- Flag Coat of arms
- Location of Gorodetsky District in Nizhny Novgorod Oblast
- Coordinates: 56°39′N 43°29′E
- Country: Russia
- Federal subject: Nizhny Novgorod Oblast
- Established: 1929
- Administrative center: Gorodets

Area
  - Total: 1,473.7 km^{2} (569.0 sq mi)

Population (2010 Census)
  - Total: 91,577
  - Density: 62.141/km^{2} (160.94/sq mi)
  - Urban: 79.3%
  - Rural: 20.7%

Administrative structure
  - Administrative divisions: 2 Towns of district significance, 1 Work settlements, 9 Selsoviets
  - Inhabited localities: 2 cities/towns, 1 urban-type settlements, 434 rural localities

Municipal structure
  - Municipally incorporated as: Gorodetsky Municipal District
  - Municipal divisions: 3 urban settlements, 9 rural settlements
- Time zone: UTC+3 (MSK)
- OKTMO ID: 22628000
- Website: http://www.gorodets-adm.ru

Gorodetsky District (Russian: Городе́цкий райо́н) is an administrative district (raion), one of the forty in Nizhny Novgorod Oblast, Russia. Municipally, it is incorporated as Gorodetsky Municipal District. It is located in the west of the oblast. The area of the district is 1,473.7 square kilometers (569.0 sq mi). Its administrative center is the town of Gorodets. Population: 91,577 (2010 Census); 64,700 (2002 census); 69,451 (1989 Soviet census). The population of Gorodets accounts for 33.5% of the district's total population.

== History ==
The district was established in 1929.

== Notable residents ==
- Alexander Semyonovich Vedernikov (1898–1975), artist
