= List of people from Chelyabinsk =

Coat of Arms of Chelyabinsk

This is a list of notable people who were born or have lived in Chelyabinsk, Russia.

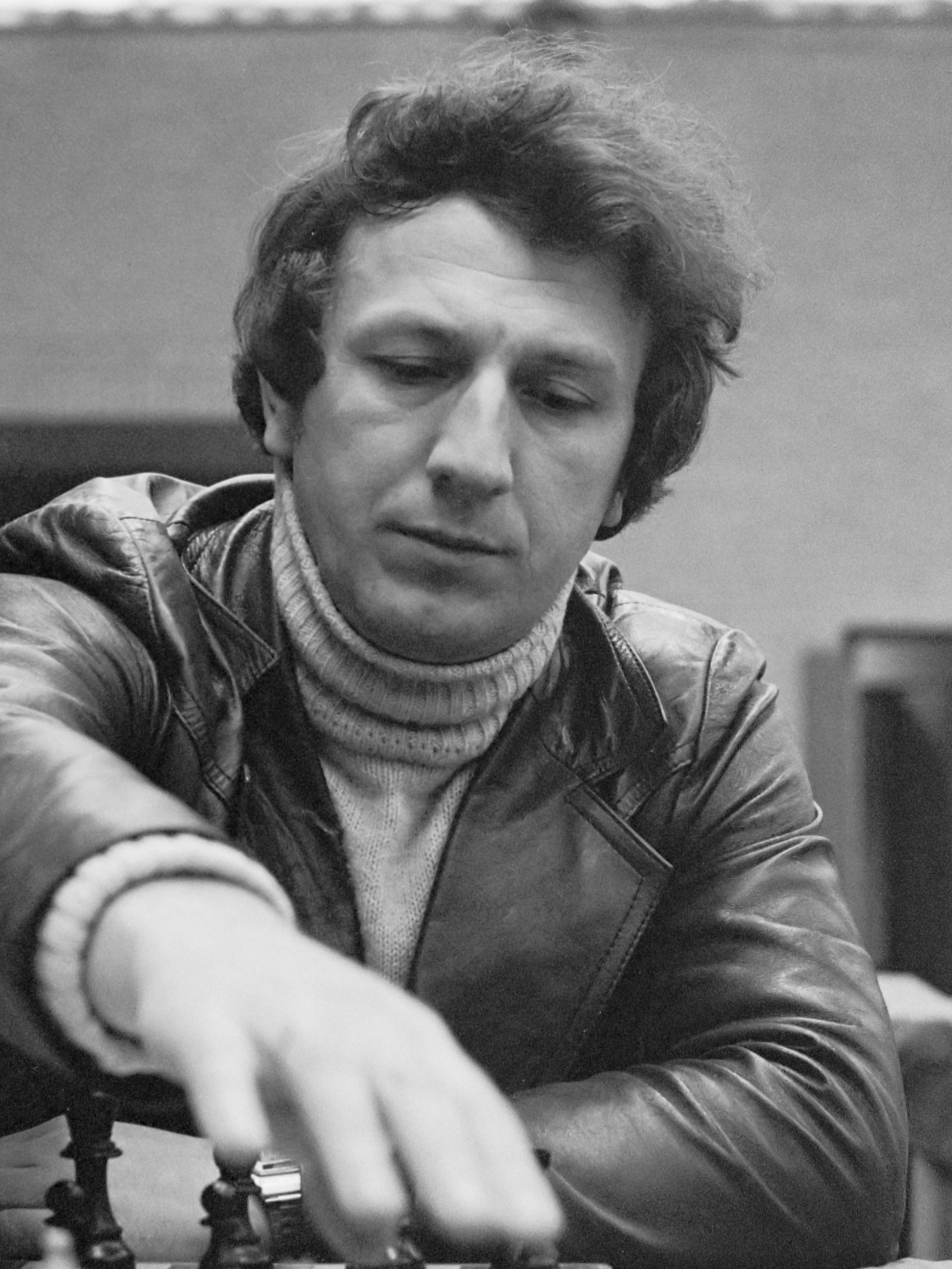
Evgeny Sveshnikov (born 1950)

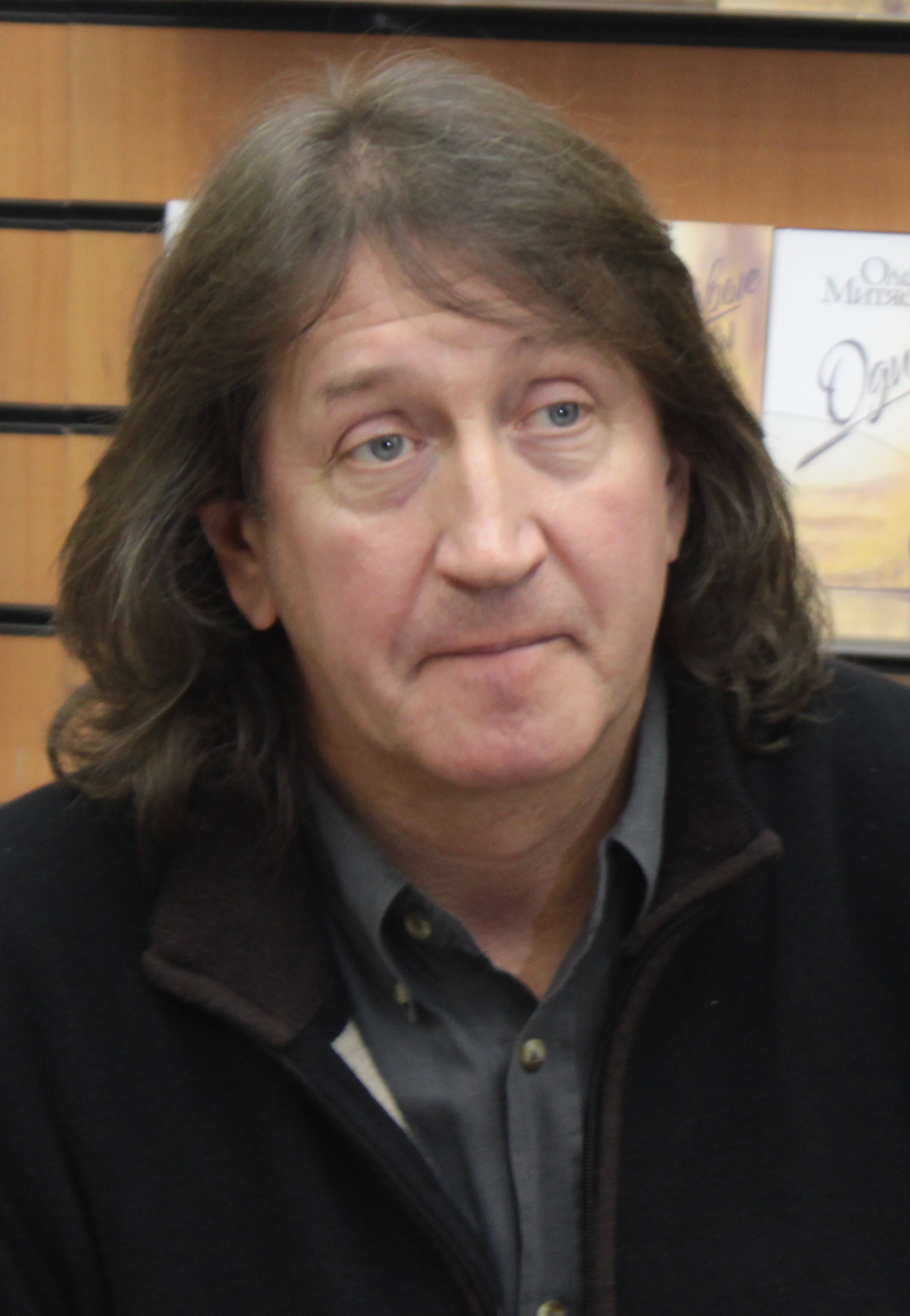
Oleg Mityaev (born 1956)

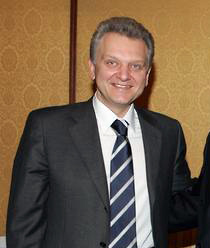
Viktor Khristenko (born 1957)

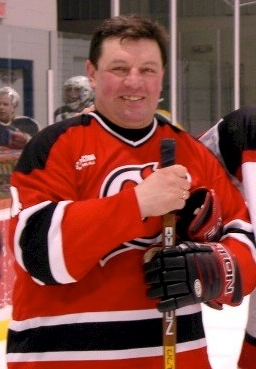
Sergei Starikov (born 1958)

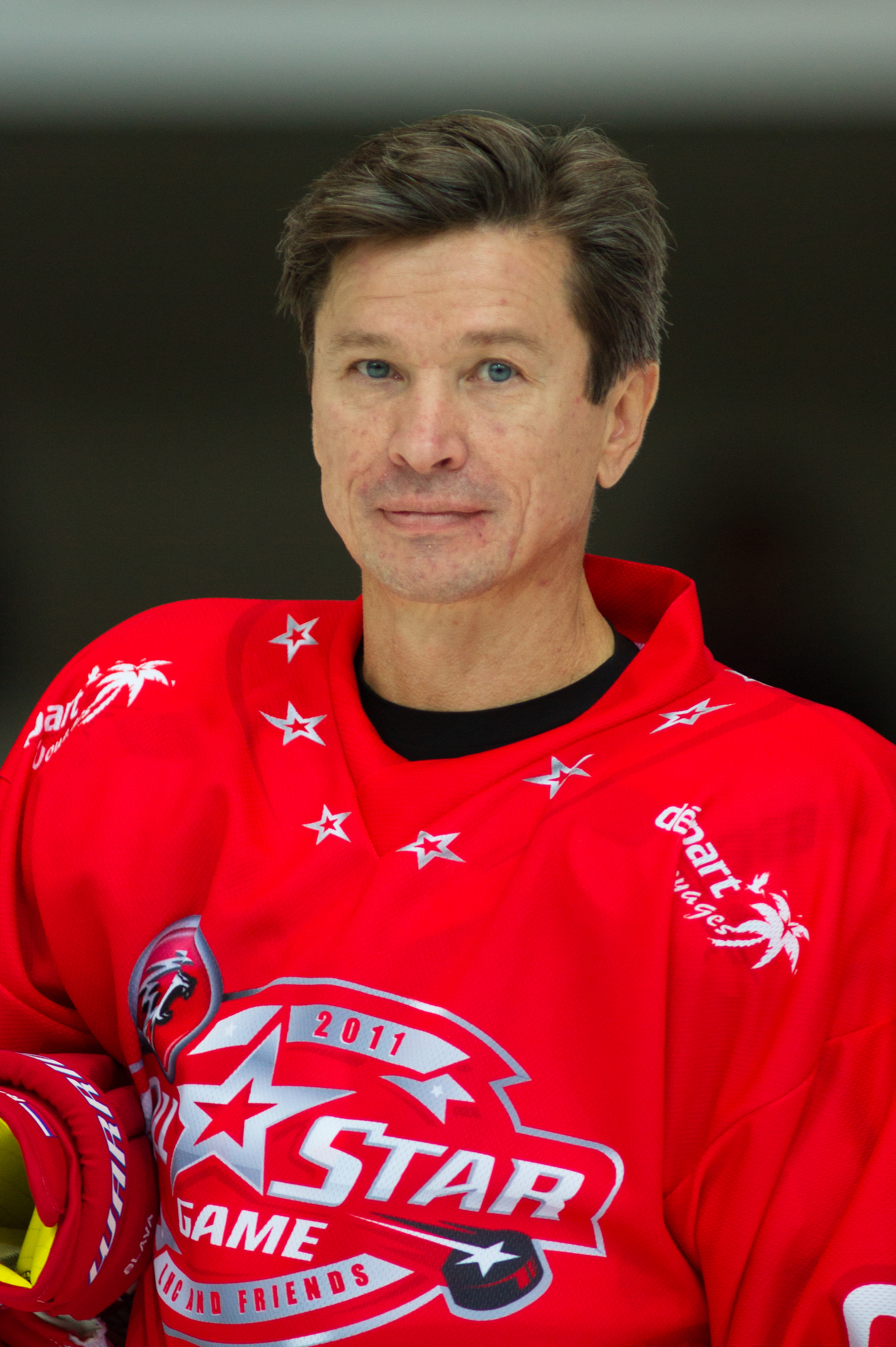
Vyacheslav Bykov (born 1960)

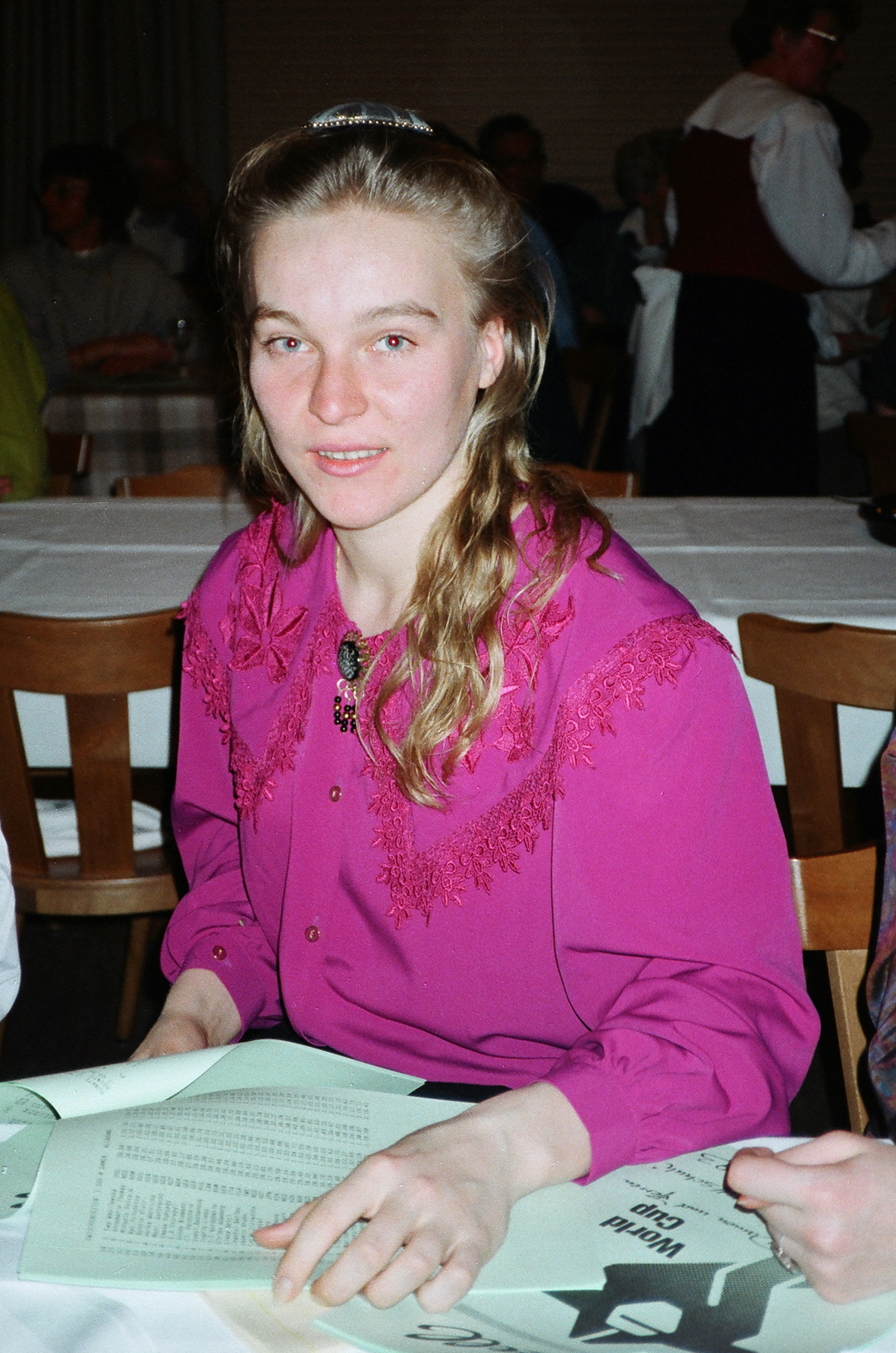
Svetlana Bazhanova (born 1972)

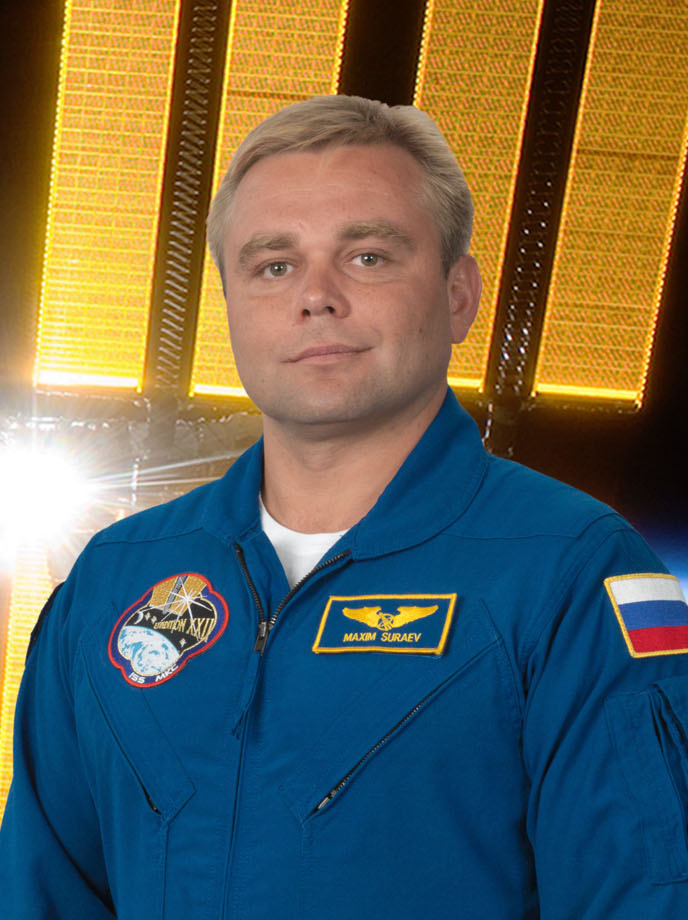
Maksim Surayev (born 1972)

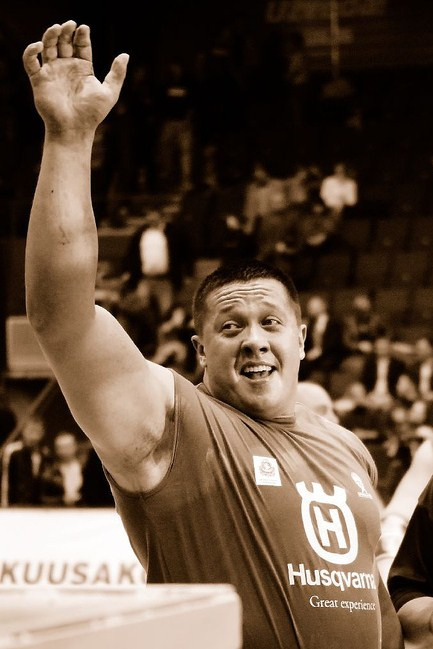
Mikhail Koklyaev (born 1978)

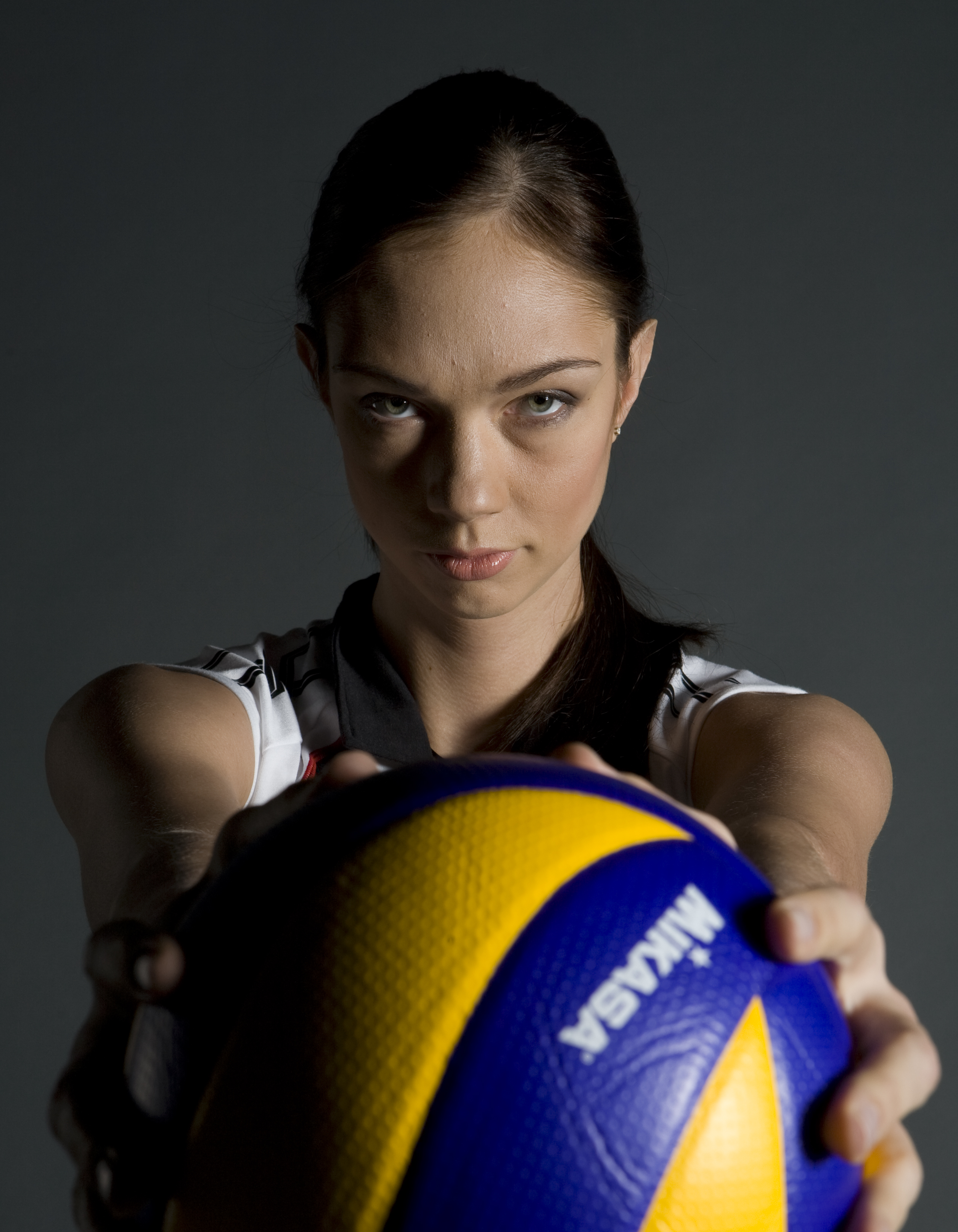
Yekaterina Gamova (born 1980)

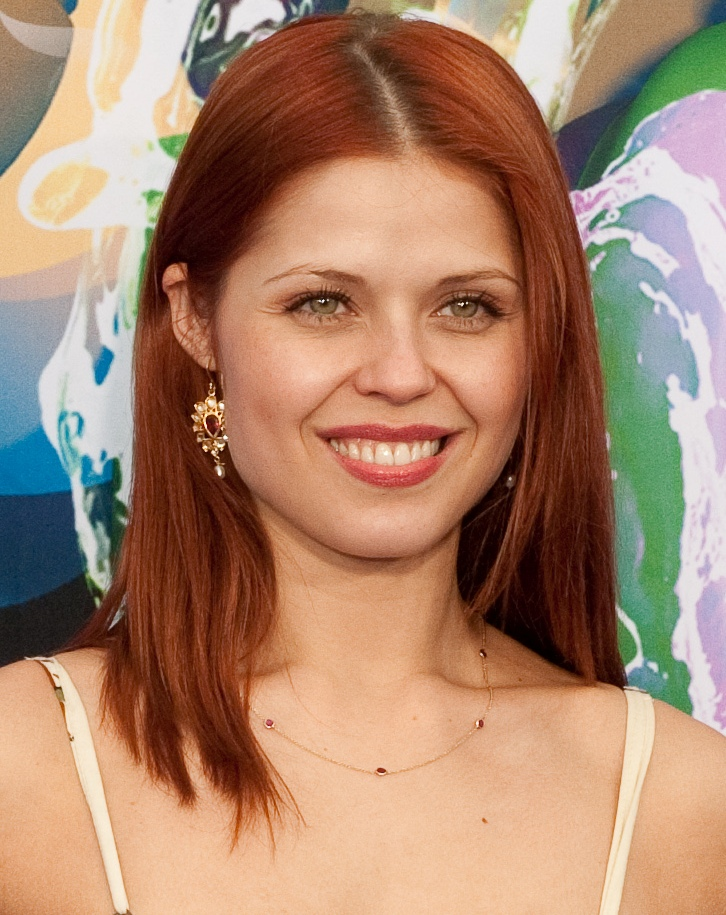
Anna Trebunskaya (born 1980)

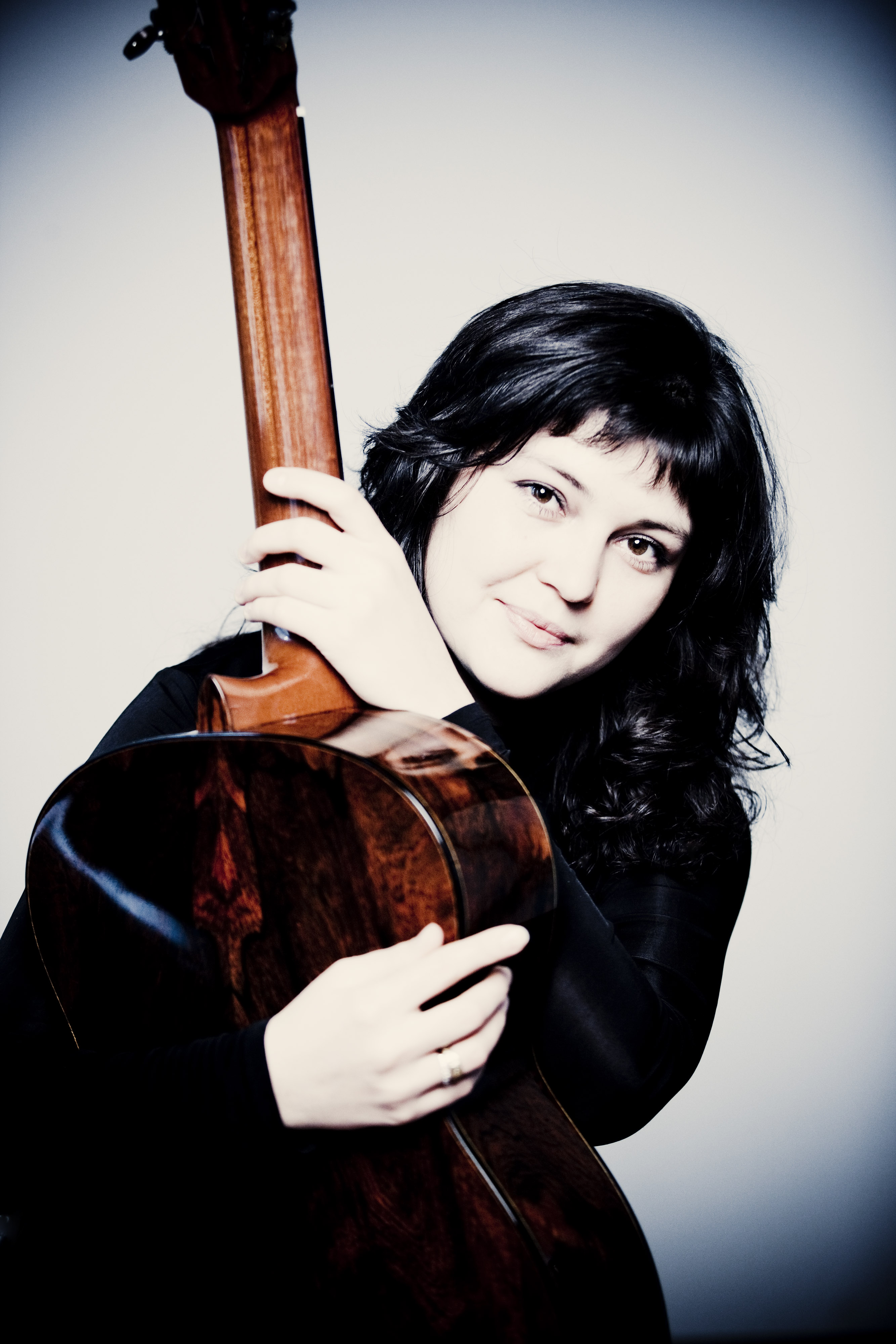
Irina Kulikova (born 1982)

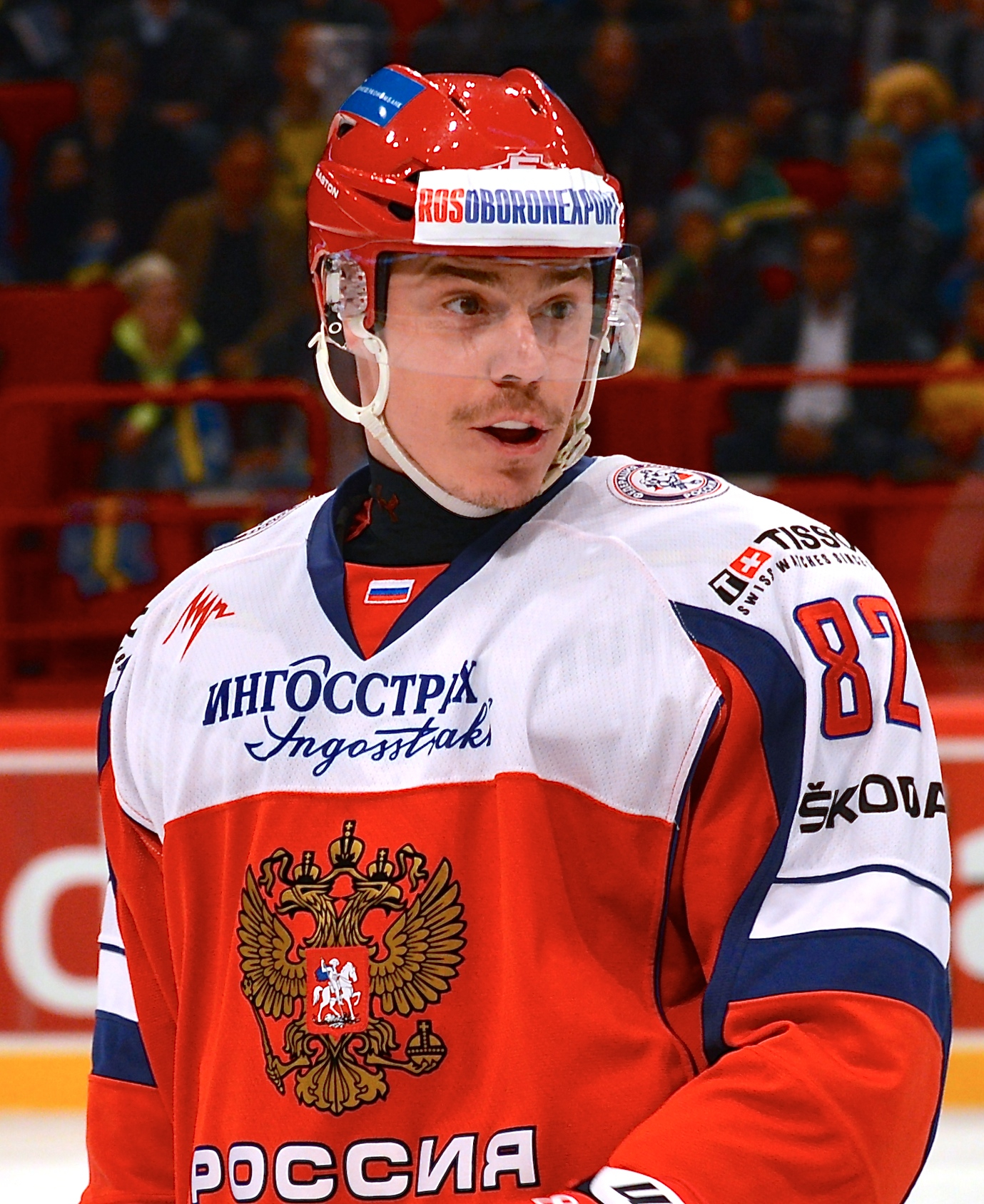
Evgeny Medvedev (born 1982)

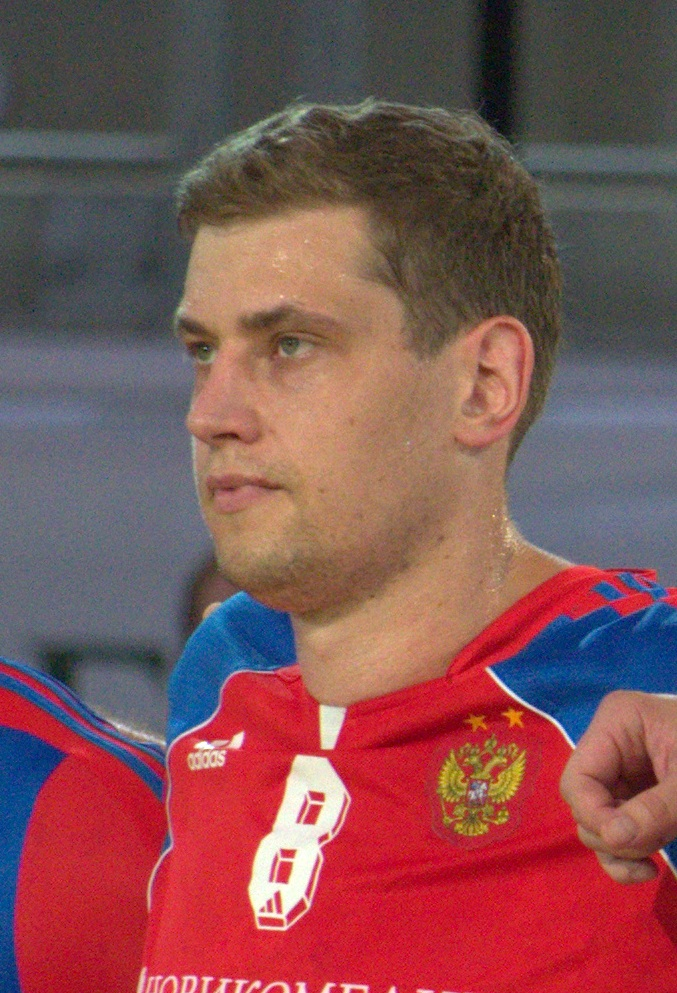
Yegor Yevdokimov (born 1982)

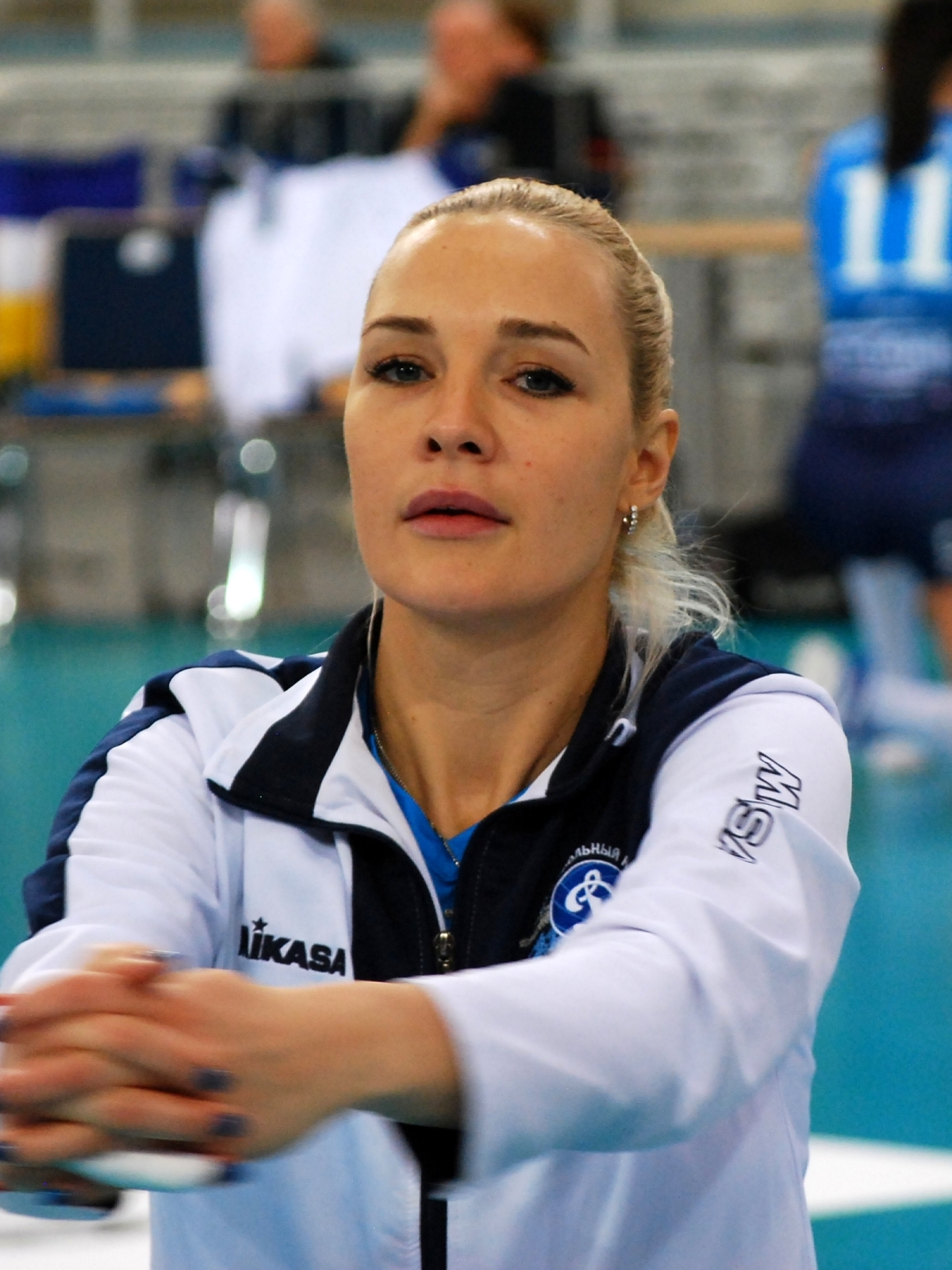
Iuliia Morozova (born 1985)

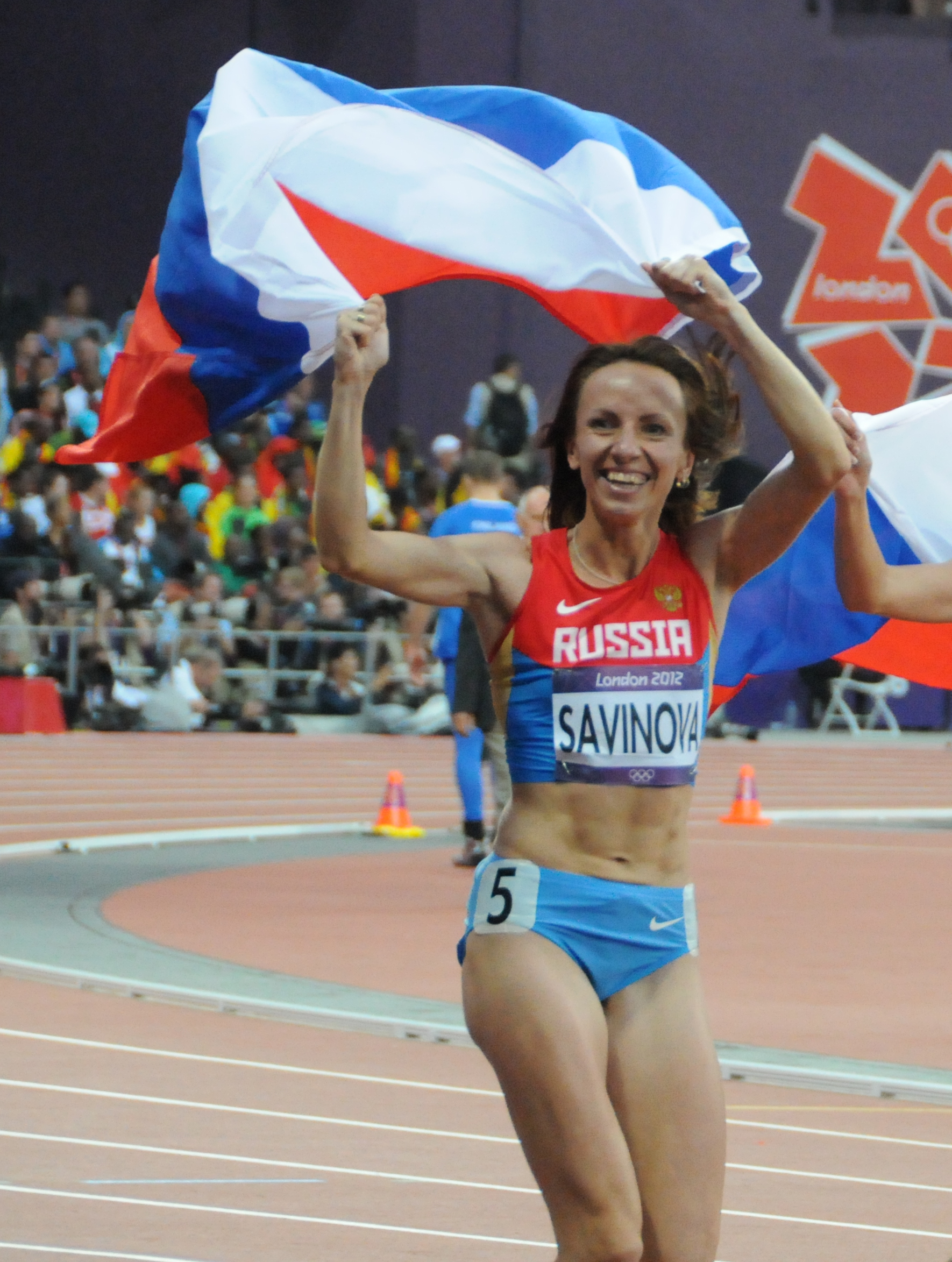
Mariya Savinova (born 1985)

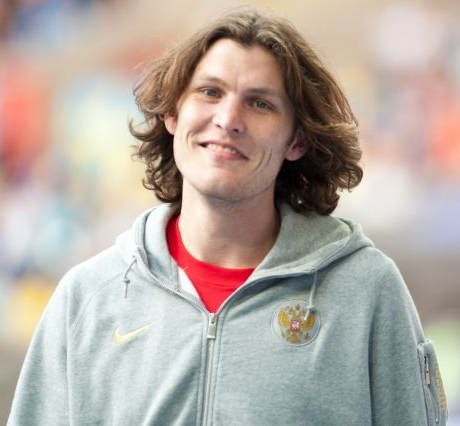
Ivan Ukhov (born 1986)

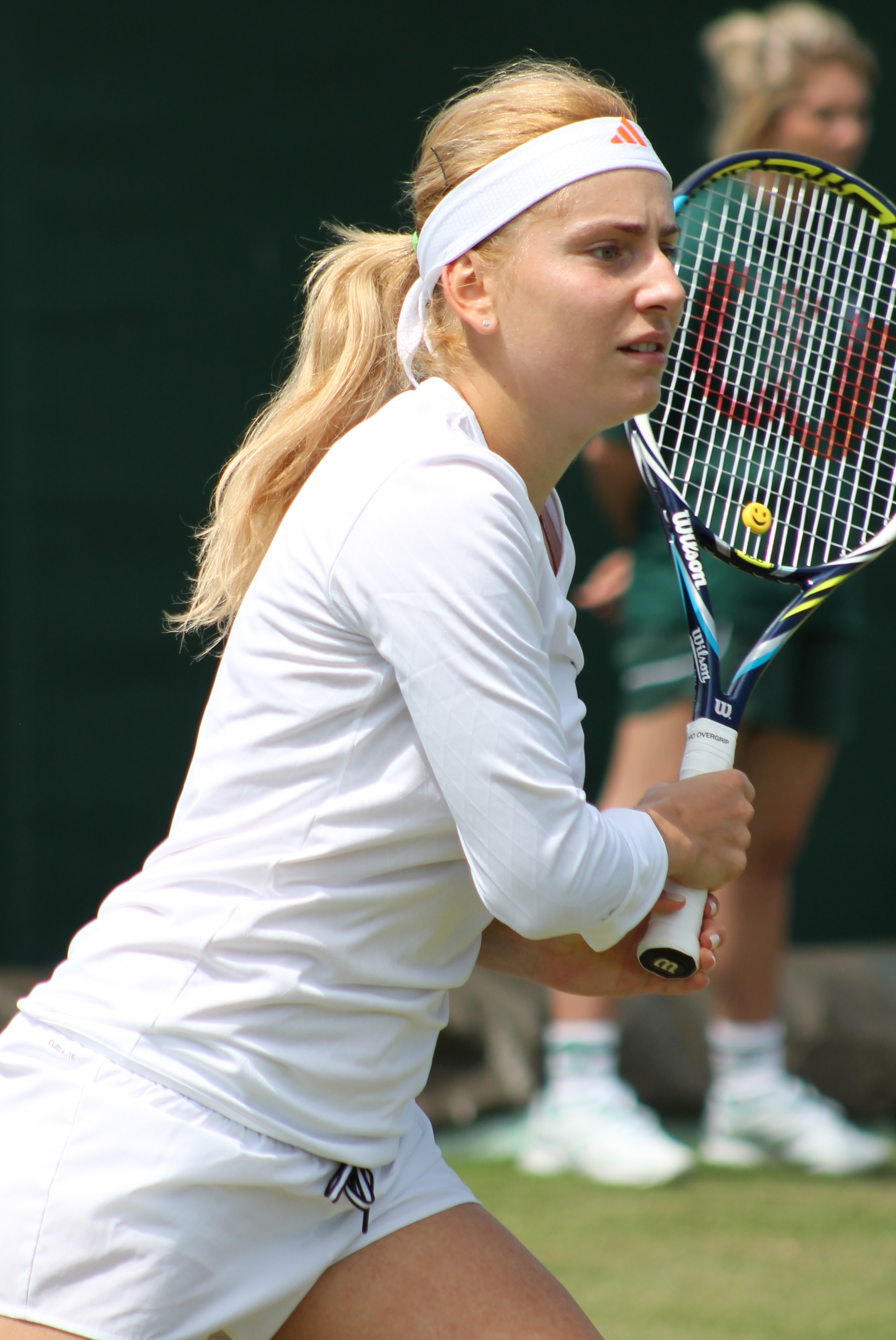
Ksenia Pervak (born 1991)

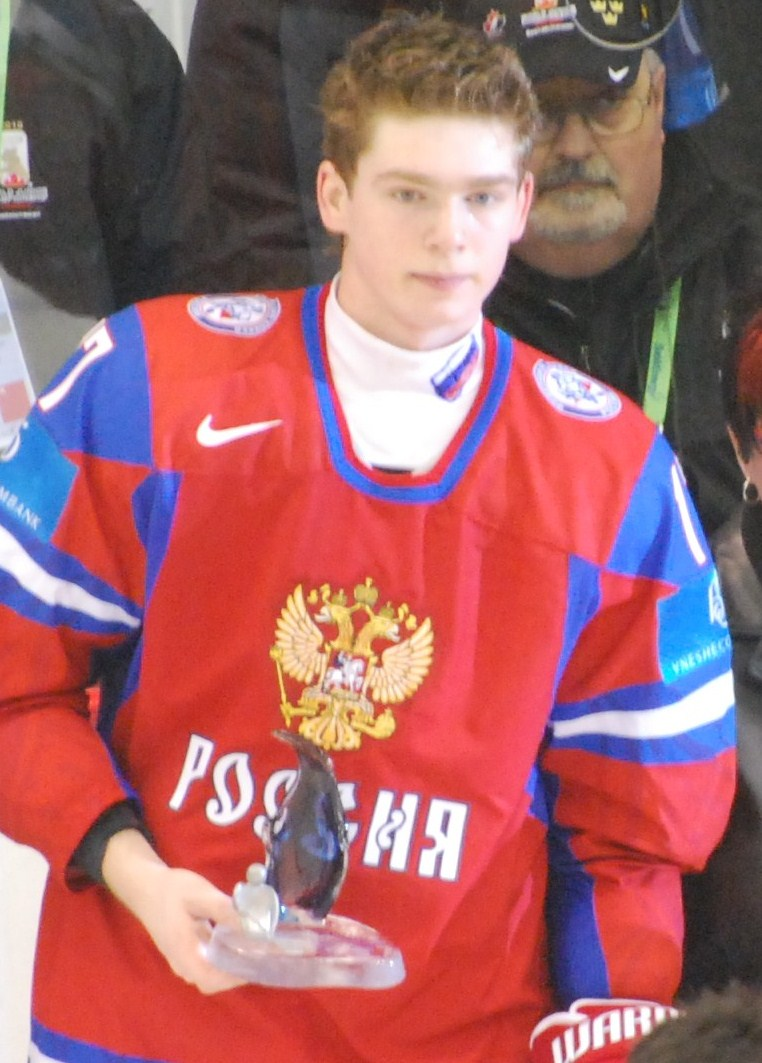
Evgeny Kuznetsov (born 1992)

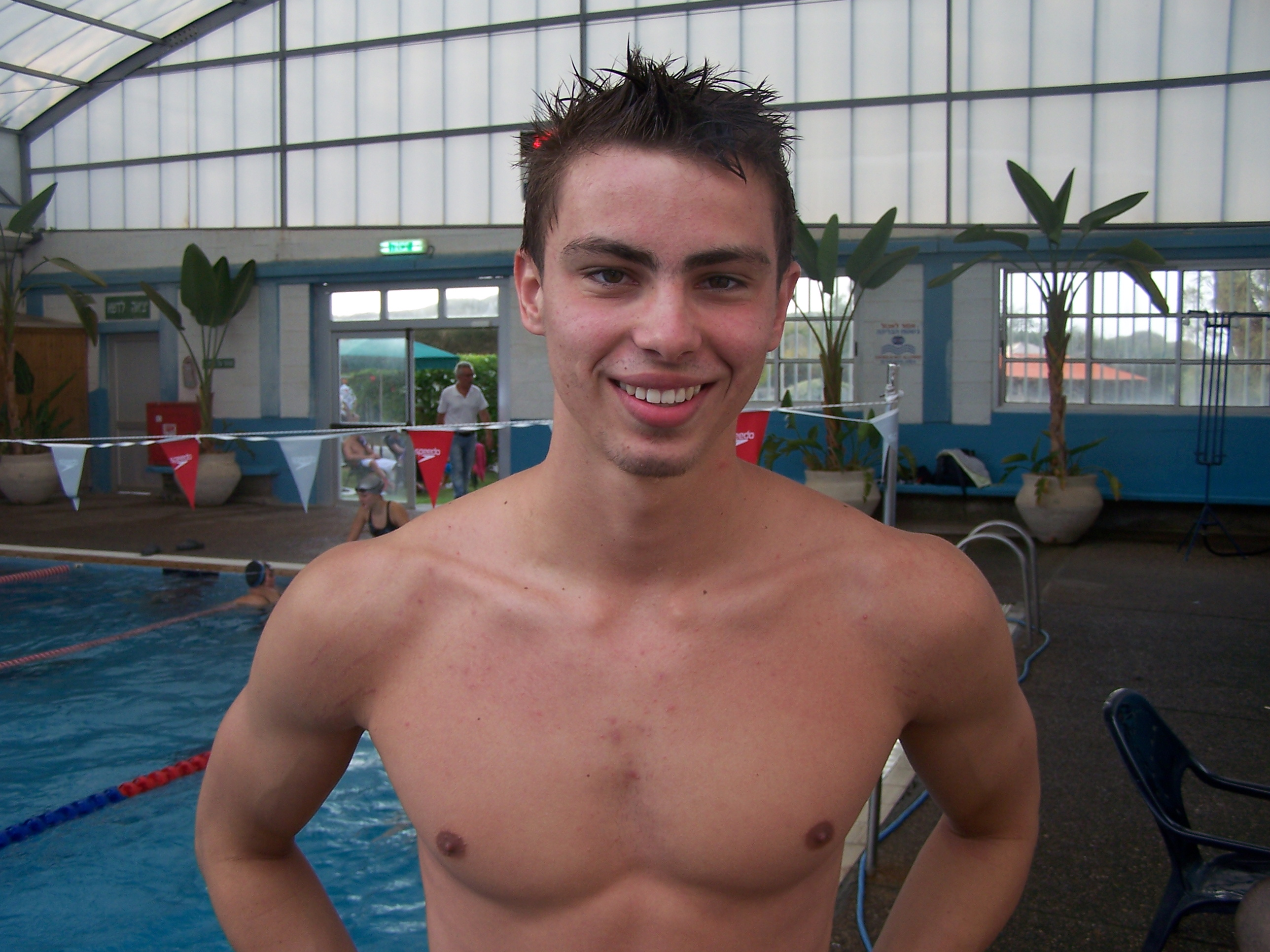
Yakov Toumarkin (born 1992)

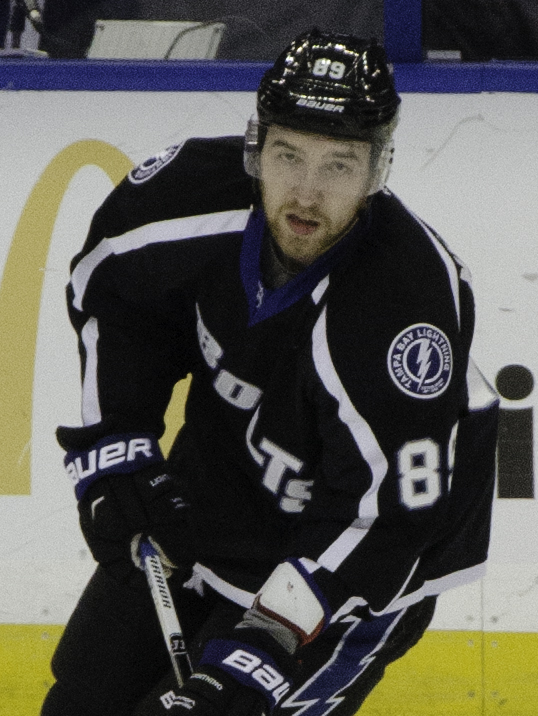
Nikita Nesterov (born 1993)

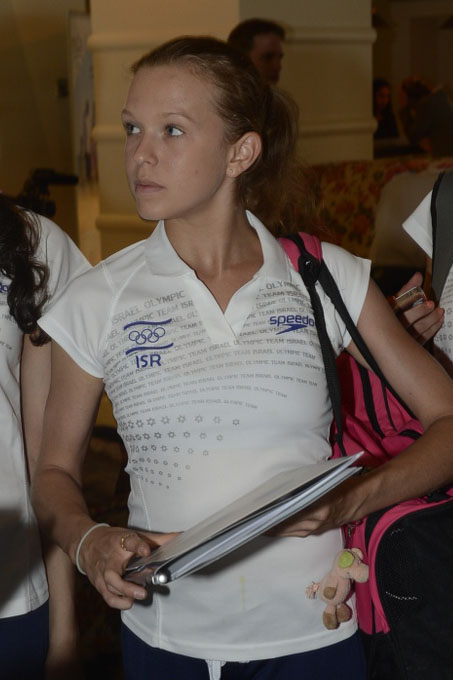
Marina Shults (born 1994)

== Born in Chelyabinsk ==
=== 19th century ===
==== 1801–1900 ====
- Vladimir Szmurlo (1865–1931), Russian Esperantist and railway engineer

=== 20th century ===
==== 1901–1940 ====
- Esphyr Slobodkina (1908–2002), popular artist, author and illustrator
- Sidney Gordin (1918–1996), Russian-born American artist and educator
- Makhmut Gareev (1923–2019), Russian General of the Army, historian and military scientist
- Evgeni Rogov (1929–1996), Russian and Soviet football player and football manager
- Yuri Klepikov (1935–2021), Russian screenwriter and actor
- Tatyana Sidorova (born 1936), Russian speed skater
- Nelli Abramova (born 1940), Soviet competitive volleyball player and Olympic silver medalist in 1964

==== 1941–1950 ====
- Aleksey Kuznetsov (born 1941), Russian guitarist, composer and guitar pedagogue
- Eduard Sibiryakov (1941–2014), Soviet volleyball player
- Svyatoslav Belza (1942–2014), Soviet Russian literary and musical scholar, critic and essayist
- Gennady Tsygurov (1942–2016), Russian professional ice hockey coach and former player
- Vera Popkova (1943–2011), Soviet track and field athlete
- Pyotr Shubin (born 1944), Russian professional football coach and former player
- Yuri Aizenshpis (1945–2005), Russian music manager and producer
- Boris Kopeykin (born 1945), Soviet football player and Russian coach
- Anna Sablina (born 1945), Russian speed skater
- Galina Starovoytova (1946–1998), Soviet dissident, Russian politician and ethnographer
- Anatoli Kartayev (born 1947), Russian and Soviet professional ice hockey player and coach
- Sergey Mikhalyov (1947–2015), Russian ice hockey coach
- Nikolay Makarov (born 1948), Russian ice hockey player
- Yevgeny Kotlov (1949–2016), Soviet hockey player
- Evgeny Sveshnikov (1950–2021), Russian, former Soviet and Latvian Grandmaster of chess and a chess writer

==== 1951–1960 ====
- Aleksandr Voronin (1951–1992), Russian weightlifter and Olympic champion
- Alexander Panchenko (1953–2009), Russian chess Grandmaster
- Pavel Zhagun (born 1954), Russian poet, musician, record producer, artist and curator
- Sergei Babinov (born 1955), Soviet ice hockey player
- Oleg Mityaev (born 1956), Russian bard, musician and actor
- Viktor Khristenko (born 1957), Russian politician
- Vladimir Markelov (1957–2023), Russian former gymnast
- Fail Mirgalimov (born 1957), Russian football manager and former player
- Nelli Rokita (born 1957), Polish politician
- Sergei Makarov (born 1958), Russian former ice hockey right wing and two-time Olympic gold medalist
- Sergei Mylnikov (1958–2017), Soviet ice hockey player
- Svetlana Nikishina (born 1958), Soviet volleyball player
- Alexander Pochinok (1958–2014), Russian economist and politician
- Sergei Starikov (born 1958), Russian ice hockey coach and player
- Vyacheslav Bykov (born 1960), Soviet and Russian ice hockey player and a former head coach of the Russian national hockey team

==== 1961–1970 ====
- Irina Kostyuchenkova (1961–2023), Soviet and Ukrainian female javelin thrower
- Yelena Skrynnik (born 1961), the first female minister of agriculture of the Russian Federation between 2009 and 2012
- Oleg Gusev (born 1964), Russian entrepreneur and politician
- Andrei Zuev (born 1964), Russian ice hockey goaltender
- Marat Romanov (born 1966), Russian wheelchair curler
- Evgeny Davydov (born 1967), Russian professional ice hockey player
- Yelena Sayko (born 1967), Russian race walker
- Leonid Novitskiy (born 1968), Russian cross-country rally driver
- Vadim Brovtsev (1969–2024), Russian businessman who was Prime Minister of the Republic of South Ossetia from 2009 to 2012
- Svetlana Goundarenko (born 1969), Russian mixed martial artist and judoka
- Mikhail Yurevich (born 1969), Russian politician; former governor of Chelyabinsk Oblast (2010–2014)
- Ariel (formed 1970), Soviet "VIA" (pop/rock) band
- Sergey Gomolyako (born 1970), Russian ice hockey player
- Yuriy Konovalov (born 1970), Russian professional footballer
- Rishat Shafikov (born 1970), Russian race walker
- Yelena Yelesina (born 1970), Russian female high jumper; won the gold medal at the 2000 Summer Olympics with 2,01 m

==== 1971–1975 ====
- Valeri Karpov (1971–2014), Soviet ice hockey player
- Andrei Sapozhnikov (born 1971), Soviet ice hockey player
- Denis Tsygurov (1971–2015), Russian professional ice hockey player
- Igor Varitsky (born 1971), Soviet ice hockey player
- Svetlana Bazhanova (born 1972), Russian speed skater
- Viktor Bulatov (born 1972), Russian football coach and a former international football player
- Artem Kopot (1972–1992), Russian professional ice hockey defenseman
- Natalya Polozkova (born 1972), Russian speed skater
- Eugene Roshal (born 1972), Russian software engineer
- Maksim Surayev (born 1972), Russian cosmonaut
- Lera Auerbach (born 1973), Soviet-Russian-born American classical composer and pianist
- Natalya Sokolova (born 1973), Russian biathlete
- Maxim Bets (born 1974), Russian professional ice hockey player
- Sergei Gonchar (born 1974), Russian professional ice hockey player
- Andrei Konovalov (born 1974), Russian professional football coach and a former player
- Maria Koroleva (born 1974), Russian water polo player
- Konstantin Lyzhin (born 1974), Russian football player
- Andrei Mezin (born 1974), Belarusian goaltender
- Andrei Nazarov (born 1974), Russian professional ice hockey player
- Kostyantyn Rurak (born 1974), Ukrainian sprinter
- Dmitry Yesipchuk (born 1974), Russian race walker
- Alexandre Boikov (born 1975), Russian ice hockey defenceman
- Evgeni Galkin (born 1975), Russian professional ice hockey winger
- Vitali Yachmenev (born 1975), Russian professional ice hockey left wing

==== 1976–1980 ====
- Denis Peremenin (born 1976), Russian football player
- Dmitri Tertyshny (1976–1999), Russian professional ice hockey defenceman
- Konstantin Sidulov (born 1977), Russian professional ice hockey defenceman
- Alexei Tertyshny (born 1977), Russian professional ice hockey winger
- Svetlana Kaykan (born 1978), Russian speed skater
- Mikhail Koklyaev (born 1978), Russian National weightlifting champion, strongman competitor and powerlifter
- Rustam Akhmyarov (born 1979), Russian who was held in extrajudicial detention in the United States Guantanamo Bay detainment camps
- Anastasiya Kodirova (born 1979), Russian volleyball player
- Staņislavs Olijars (born 1979), Latvian athlete
- Yuliya Petrova (born 1979), Russian water polo player
- Nikolay Averyanov (born 1980), Russian decathlete
- Yekaterina Gamova (born 1980), Russian volleyball player
- Dmitri Kalinin (born 1980), Russian professional ice hockey defenceman
- Sofia Konukh (born 1980), Russian water polo player
- Konstantin Panov (born 1980), Russian professional ice hockey Right Wing
- Tatyana Sibileva (born 1980), Russian female race walker
- Anna Trebunskaya (born 1980), Russian born American professional ballroom and Latin dancer
- Alexei Zavarukhin (born 1980), Russian professional ice hockey center

==== 1981–1985 ====
- Ivan Savin (born 1981), Russian professional ice hockey defenceman
- Danis Zaripov (born 1981), Russian professional ice hockey left winger
- Ivan Danshin (born 1982), Russian professional footballer
- Denis Kulakov (born 1982), Russian sport shooter
- Irina Kulikova (born 1982), Russian classical guitarist
- Evgeny Medvedev (born 1982), Russian professional ice hockey defenseman
- Olga Permyakova (born 1982), Russian ice hockey defender
- Yevgeni Yaroslavtsev (born 1982), Russian professional footballer
- Yegor Yevdokimov (born 1982), Russian handball player
- Stanislav Chistov (born 1983), Russian professional ice hockey player
- Georgy Gelashvili (born 1983), Russian professional ice hockey goaltender
- Aleksei Gorelkin (born 1983), Russian professional footballer
- Alexei Kaigorodov (born 1983), Russian professional ice hockey forward
- Kirill Koltsov (born 1983), Russian professional ice hockey defenceman
- Arseniy Lavrentyev (born 1983), Russian-born Portuguese professional swimmer
- Anton Vasilev (born 1983), Russian sprint canoer
- Tatyana Yerokhina (born 1984), Russian handball goalkeeper
- Marina Akulova (born 1985), Russian female volleyball player
- Igor Bogolyubskiy (born 1985), Russian speed skater
- Yuri Koksharov (born 1985), Russian professional ice hockey centre
- Igor Kurnosov (1985–2013), Russian chess grandmaster
- Iuliia Morozova (born 1985), Russian volleyball player
- Mariya Savinova (born 1985), Russian athlete
- Grigory Shafigulin (born 1985), Russian professional ice hockey player

==== 1986–1990 ====
- Alexander Budkin (born 1986), Russian professional ice hockey defenceman
- Vladislav Fokin (born 1986), Russian professional ice hockey Goaltender
- Sergei Ignatyev (born 1986), Russian professional football player
- Evgeny Katichev (born 1986), Russian professional ice hockey defenceman
- Dmitry Starodubtsev (born 1986), Russian pole vaulter
- Ivan Ukhov (born 1986), Russian high jumper
- Vadim Berdnikov (born 1987), Russian professional ice hockey player
- Vladimir Ivanov, Russian badminton player
- Alexander Kalyanin (1987–2011), Russian professional ice hockey winger
- Yekaterina Malysheva (born 1987), Russian speed skater
- Ilya Zubov (born 1987), Russian professional ice hockey player
- Ivan Dorn (born 1988), Russian-born Ukrainian singer and TV presenter
- Anton Glinkin (born 1988), Russian professional ice hockey forward
- Mikhail Kuznetsov (born 1988), Russian pair skater
- Andrei Popov (born 1988), Russian professional ice hockey right winger
- Dmitri Sayustov (born 1988), Russian professional ice hockey centre
- Evgenii Dadonov (born 1989), Russian professional ice hockey player
- Aleksey Dremin (born 1989), Russian sprinter
- Oxana Guseva (born 1989), Russian Paralympic swimmer
- Vitali Menshikov (born 1989), Russian professional ice hockey player
- Kseniya Moskvina (born 1989), Russian swimmer
- Mikhail Pashnin (born 1989), Russian professional ice hockey defenceman
- Evgeny Rybnitsky (born 1989), Russian ice hockey defenceman
- Yevgeniya Startseva (born 1989), Russian volleyball player
- Danil Yerdakov (born 1989), Russian professional ice hockey player
- Nikita Zhdankin (born 1989), Russian professional football player
- Alexandra Vafina (born 1990), Russian Olympic ice hockey player
- Danila Alistratov (born 1990), Russian ice hockey goaltender
- Anastasia Baryshnikova (born 1990), Russian taekwondo practitioner
- Egor Dugin (born 1990), Russian professional ice hockey centre
- Olga Fatkulina (born 1990), Russian long-track speed skater
- Anton Lazarev (born 1990), Russian professional ice hockey forward
- Dmitri Kostromitin (born 1990), Russian professional ice hockey defenceman
- Vadim Muntagirov (born 1990), Russian ballet dancer
- Slava Voynov (born 1990), Russian professional ice hockey defenceman

==== 1991–2000 ====
- Anton Burdasov (born 1991), Russian professional ice hockey forward
- Natalia Gantimurova (born 1991), Russian beauty pageant titleholder who was crowned Miss Russia 2011
- Maxim Karpov (born 1991), Russian professional ice hockey player
- Ksenia Pervak (born 1991), Russian professional tennis player
- Aleksey Suvorov (born 1991), Russian speed-skater
- Anna Vinogradova (born 1991), Russian ice hockey goaltender
- Andrey Zubkov (born 1991), Russian basketball player
- Dmitri Akishin (born 1992), Russian professional ice hockey defenceman
- Vladislav Kartayev (born 1992), Russian ice hockey player
- Denis Kudryavtsev (born 1992), Russian athlete specialising in the 400 metres hurdles
- Evgeny Kuznetsov (born 1992), Russian professional ice hockey forward
- Yakov Toumarkin (born 1992), Israeli swimmer
- Zhan Bush (born 1993), Russian figure skater
- Sergey Glukhov (born 1993), Russian curler
- Nikita Nesterov (born 1993), Russian professional ice hockey defenceman
- Ksenia Pecherkina (born 1993), ice dancer
- Nikolai Prokhorkin (born 1993), Russian professional ice hockey player
- Maxim Shalunov (born 1993), Russian professional ice hockey player
- Ekaterina Alexandrova (born 1994), Russian professional tennis player
- Evgeniya Kosetskaya (born 1994), Russian female badminton player
- Vyacheslav Osnovin (born 1994), Russian ice hockey player
- Marina Shults (born 1994), Israeli group rhythmic gymnast
- Valeri Nichushkin (born 1995), Russian professional ice hockey right winger
- Viktor Poletaev (born 1995), Russian volleyball player
- Ekaterina Efremenkova (born 1997), Russian speed skater
- Yegor Nikulin (born 1997), Russian football player
- Roman Abalin, (born 1998), Russian YouTuber
- Ekaterina Borisova (born 1999), Russian pair skater

== Lived in Chelyabinsk ==
- Stanislav Hazheev (born 1941), the Minister of Defence in Transnistria
- Sergey Kovalev (born 1983), current WBO Light Heavyweight Boxing Champion; former IBF, WBA, the Ring Champion
- Vladimir Stepanov (born 1958), Russian armwrestler
- Oleg Znarok (born 1963), former Soviet and Latvian ice hockey player, with German citizenship since 2001; coach of the Russian national hockey team

== See also ==
- List of Russian people
- List of Russian-language poets
