= Fokin =

Russian surname

Fokin (Russian: Фокин), sometimes spelled Fokine, or Fokina (Фокина; feminine), is a common Russian surname. Notable people with the surname include:

- Alejandro Davidovich Fokina (born 1999), Spanish professional tennis player
- Anton Fokin (born 1982), Uzbek artistic gymnast
- Galina Fokina (born 1984), Russian former tennis player
- Igor Fokin (1960–1996), Russian puppeteer and street performer
- Maksim Fokin (born 1982), Russian footballer
- Michel Fokine (1880–1942), Russian choreographer and dancer
- Serafima Fokina (born 2008), Russian swimmer
- Sergei Fokin (footballer) (born 1961) Russian footballer
- Sergei Fokin (ice hockey) (born 1963) Russian ice hockey player
- Valery Fokin (born 1946), Russian theatrical director and writer
- Vitaliy Alekseyevich Fokin (1906–1964), Russian admiral
- Vitold Fokin (1932–2025), Ukrainian deputy prime minister
  - Fokin Government, the Ukrainian government cabinet (1990–1991) under Vitold Fokin
- Vladislav Fokin (born 1986), Russian ice hockey player
- Yevgeni Fokin (1909–1972), Russian footballer
- Yuriy Fokin (born 1966), Ukrainian footballer

== See also ==
- Fokino (disambiguation)
