= Fokino =

Fokino may refer to:

- Fokino Urban Okrug, name of several urban okrugs in Russia
- Fokino (inhabited locality), name of several inhabited localities in Russia

== See also ==
- Fokin
