= Dugin =

Dugin (Russian: Дугин) is a Russian masculine surname originating from the word duga (a curve); its feminine counterpart is Dugina. Notable people with the surname include:

- Aleksandr Dugin (born 1962), Russian political philosopher, analyst, and strategist
- Darya Dugina (1992–2022), Russian journalist and political activist, daughter of Aleksandr Dugin
- Dmitri Dugin (born 1968), Russian water polo player
- Egor Dugin (born 1990), Russian ice hockey center
