= Budkin =

Budkin is a surname. Notable people with the surname include:

- Alexander Budkin (born 1986), Russian ice hockey player
- Dmitrij Ivanovich Budkin (born 1971), Russian artist
- Philip Budkin (1806–1850), Russian painter and academic
- Siarhiej Budkin (born 1982), Belarusian journalist
