= Fokino (inhabited locality) =

Fokino (Russian: Фокино) is the name of several inhabited localities in Russia.

Urban localities

- Fokino, Bryansk Oblast, a town in Dyatkovsky District, Bryansk Oblast
- Fokino, Primorsky Krai, a closed town in Primorsky Krai

Rural localities

- Fokino, Kaluga Oblast, a village in Iznoskovsky District of Kaluga Oblast
- Fokino, Kirov Oblast, a village in Rodyginsky Rural Okrug of Sovetsky District of Kirov Oblast
- Fokino, Kostroma Oblast, a village in Sudayskoye Settlement of Chukhlomsky District of Kostroma Oblast
- Fokino, Krasnoyarsk Krai, a village in Kucherovsky Selsoviet of Nizhneingashsky District of Krasnoyarsk Krai
- Fokino, Kursk Oblast, a village in Krupetskoy Selsoviet of Dmitriyevsky District of Kursk Oblast
- Fokino, Mari El Republic, a village in Vyatsky Rural Okrug of Sovetsky District of the Mari El Republic
- Fokino, Moscow Oblast, a settlement in Belavinskoye Rural Settlement of Orekhovo-Zuyevsky District of Moscow Oblast
- Fokino, Koverninsky District, Nizhny Novgorod Oblast, a village in Skorobogatovsky Selsoviet of Koverninsky District of Nizhny Novgorod Oblast
- Fokino, Sharangsky District, Nizhny Novgorod Oblast, a village in Pestovsky Selsoviet of Sharangsky District of Nizhny Novgorod Oblast
- Fokino, Vorotynsky District, Nizhny Novgorod Oblast, a selo in Fokinsky Selsoviet of Vorotynsky District of Nizhny Novgorod Oblast
- Fokino, Smolensk Oblast, a village in Akatovskoye Rural Settlement of Gagarinsky District of Smolensk Oblast
- Fokino, Belozersky District, Vologda Oblast, a village in Glushkovsky Selsoviet of Belozersky District of Vologda Oblast
- Fokino, Cherepovetsky District, Vologda Oblast, a village in Batransky Selsoviet of Cherepovetsky District of Vologda Oblast
- Fokino, Arkhangelsky Selsoviet, Sokolsky District, Vologda Oblast, a village in Arkhangelsky Selsoviet of Sokolsky District of Vologda Oblast
- Fokino, Borovetsky Selsoviet, Sokolsky District, Vologda Oblast, a village in Borovetsky Selsoviet of Sokolsky District of Vologda Oblast
