= Koksharov =

Koksharov (Russian: Кокшаров) is a Russian surname. Notable people with the surname include:

- Aleksandr Koksharov (born 2004), Russian footballer
- Eduard Koksharov (1975–2026), Russian handball player and coach
- Nikolay Koksharov (1818–1893), Russian mineralogist, crystallographer, and major general
- Yuri Koksharov (born 1985), Russian ice hockey player

== See also ==
- AEK-971, an assault rifle designed by Stanislav "Sergey" Koksharov
- Koksharovia, an extinct genus of therocephalian synapsid
