= Sharanga (urban-type settlement) =

Sharanga Шаранга
- Urban-type settlement
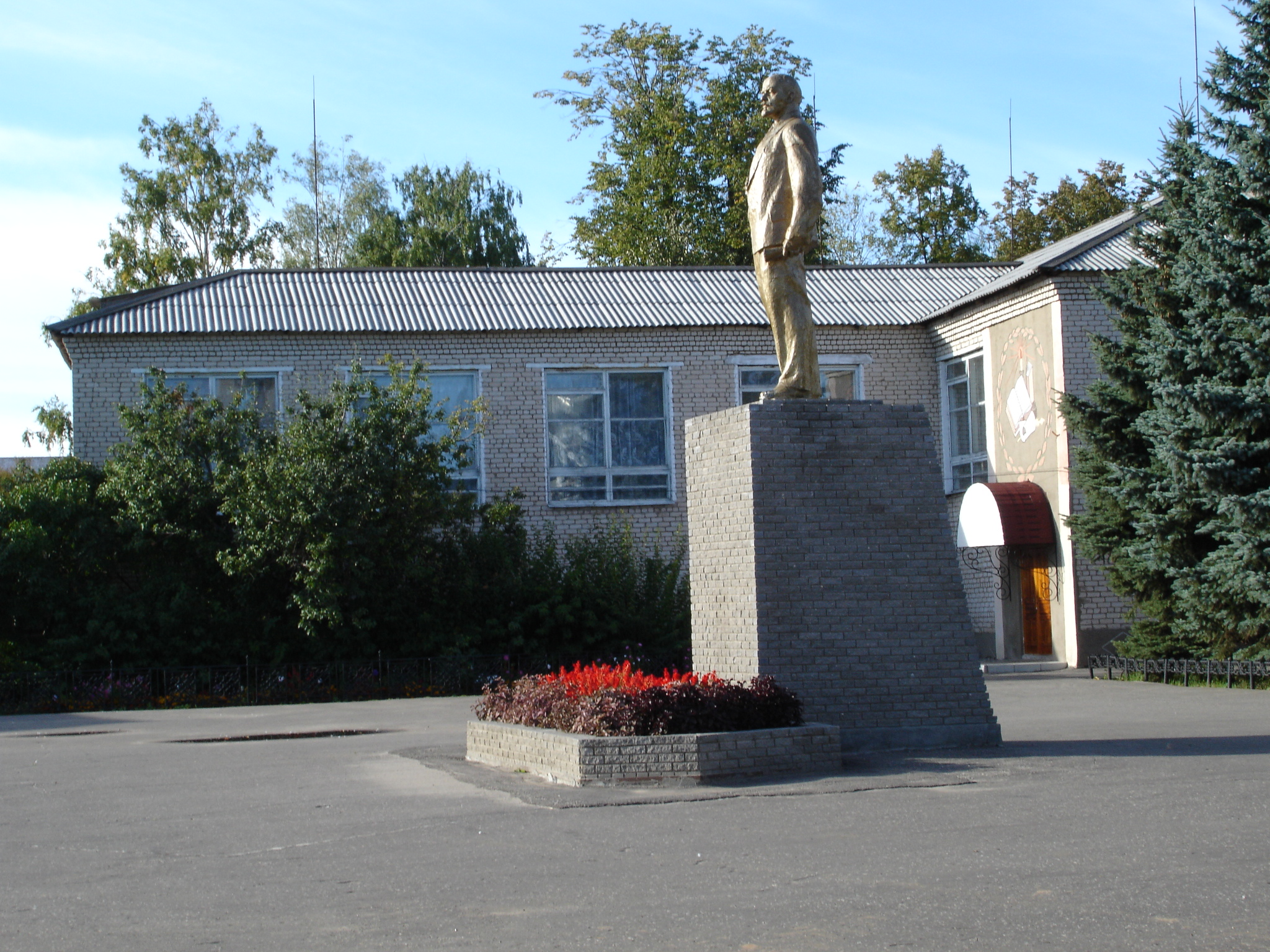
- Interactive map of Sharanga
- Location of Sharanga Sharanga (Nizhny Novgorod Oblast)
- Coordinates: 57.1766°N 46.5448°E
- Country: Russia
- Federal subject: Nizhny Novgorod Oblast
- Administrative district: Sharangsky District
- Founded: 1719

Population (2010 Census)
  - Total: 6,557
  - Estimate (2025): 6,738 (+2.8%)
- Time zone: UTC+3 (MSK)
- Postal code: 606840
- OKTMO ID: 22656151051

Sharanga (Russian: Шара́нга; Mari: Шараҥге, Šaraňge; Hill Mari: Шӓрӓнгӓ, Šärängä) is an urban locality (an urban-type settlement) in Sharangsky District of Nizhny Novgorod Oblast, Russia. Population: 6,557 (2010 census); 6,381 (2002 census); 6,053 (1989 Soviet census).
