= Alexei Zhitnik =

- Born: October 10, 1972 (age 54) Kyiv, Ukrainian SSR, Soviet Union
- Height: 5 ft 11 in (180 cm)
- Weight: 214 lb (97 kg; 15 st 4 lb)
- Position: Defence
- Shot: Left
- Played for: Sokil Kyiv; CSKA Moscow; Los Angeles Kings; Buffalo Sabres; New York Islanders; Ak Bars Kazan; Philadelphia Flyers; Atlanta Thrashers; Dynamo Moscow
- National team: Soviet Union, Unified Team and Russia
- NHL draft: 81st overall, 1991; Los Angeles Kings
- Playing career: 1989–2010
Medal record
Men's ice hockey
Olympic Games
Representing Unified Team
Gold medal – first place	1992 Albertville
Representing Russia
Silver medal – second place	1998 Nagano
World Junior Championships
Representing CIS
Gold medal – first place	1992 Germany
European Junior Championships
Representing Soviet Union
Silver medal – second place	1990 Finland

Alexei Zhitnik (Ukrainian: Олексій Миколайович Житник, Russian: Алексей Николаевич Житник; born October 10, 1972) is a Ukrainian-Russian former professional ice hockey defenceman. He has represented the Soviet Union, CIS, and Russia internationally; and Ukraine during two NHL All-Star Games. His number, 13, has been honored by Sokil Kyiv.

== Playing career ==
Zhitnik was drafted 81st overall by the Los Angeles Kings in the 1991 NHL entry draft after playing for Sokil Kyiv in the Soviet Championship League for two years. After another year, he came to the NHL for the 1992–93 NHL season.

Zhitnik made his NHL debut on October 6, 1992, against the Calgary Flames and scored his first goal nine nights later, also against Calgary. In his rookie season with the Kings, he finished second among rookie defenceman in points with 48. He was an important part of the Kings' playoff run to the Stanley Cup Final, where they lost to the Montreal Canadiens.

After another year of playing with the Kings and Wayne Gretzky, Zhitnik was traded on February 14, 1995, along with Robb Stauber, Charlie Huddy and a fifth-round draft pick, to the Buffalo Sabres for Grant Fuhr, Denis Tsygurov and Philippe Boucher. He became one of the team's best players, helping the Sabres win the Northeast Division in the 1996–97 NHL season, his second full year with the team. In the 1997–98 NHL season, he led all defensemen in shorthanded goals (3). He also helped the Sabres reach the finals in the 1998–99 NHL season and stayed on the team until the 2004–05 NHL lockout when he returned to the Russian Super League.

Following the lockout, Zhitnik signed a four-year contract with the New York Islanders. He became an effective force on the team, and even though he missed the last 18 games of the season with a fractured ankle, he finished second among team defenceman in scoring.

On December 16, 2006, Zhitnik was traded to the Philadelphia Flyers for Freddy Meyer and a conditional third-round draft pick. However, he was traded two months later on February 24, 2007, to the Atlanta Thrashers to add experience for playoffs, in exchange for Braydon Coburn.

Due to Zhitnik's disappointing play and the Thrashers focus on rebuilding, the team bought out Zhitnik's contract on June 30, 2008, making him a free agent. On July 26, 2008, Zhitnik joined the Kontinental Hockey League, signing a tryout contract with Dynamo Moscow.

He played for Ukraine at the Maccabi “Jewish Olympics” in 2013 and 2017. Zhitnik also won a gold medal as part of Team Ukraine's Masters hockey team at the 2017 Maccabiah Games.

== Awards ==
- 1992: Gold Medal (XVII Olympic Winter Games)
- 1996: Bronze Medal (World Cup of Hockey)
- 1998: Silver Medal (XVIII Olympic Winter Games)
- 1998–99: Played in the All-Star Game (NHL)
- 2001–02: Played in the All-Star Game (NHL)
- 2008: Spengler Cup Champion (Dynamo Moscow)
- 2008–09: Played in the All-Star Game (KHL)

== Records ==
- On February 20, 2007, as a Flyer, Zhitnik became the eighth defenseman born outside of North America, and first born in the Soviet Union to appear in 1,000 NHL games (Sergei Zubov has since joined Zhitnik in that regard). The others at the time were Nicklas Lidström, Börje Salming, Calle Johansson, Ulf Samuelsson, Fredrik Olausson (all from Sweden), Petr Svoboda from the Czech Republic and Teppo Numminen of Finland.

== Personal ==
As of 2022, Zhitnik was assisting Ukrainian forces after the Russian invasion of Ukraine, as well as helping Ukrainian women and children escape to safe countries.

== Career statistics ==
=== Regular season and playoffs ===
			Regular season					Playoffs
Season	Team	League	GP	G	A	Pts	PIM	GP	G	A	Pts	PIM
1988–89	ShVSM Kyiv	USSR II	5	1	0	1	2	—	—	—	—	—
1989–90	Sokil Kyiv	USSR	31	3	4	7	16	—	—	—	—	—
1990–91	Sokil Kyiv	USSR	46	1	4	5	46	—	—	—	—	—
1990–91	ShVSM Kyiv	USSR III	1	0	0	0	0	—	—	—	—	—
1991–92	CSKA Moscow	CIS	36	2	7	9	44	8	0	0	0	8
1992–93	Los Angeles Kings	NHL	78	12	36	48	80	24	3	9	12	26
1993–94	Los Angeles Kings	NHL	81	12	40	52	101	—	—	—	—	—
1994–95	Los Angeles Kings	NHL	11	2	5	7	27	—	—	—	—	—
1994–95	Buffalo Sabres	NHL	21	2	5	7	34	5	0	1	1	14
1995–96	Buffalo Sabres	NHL	80	6	30	36	58	—	—	—	—	—
1996–97	Buffalo Sabres	NHL	80	7	28	35	95	12	1	0	1	16
1997–98	Buffalo Sabres	NHL	78	15	30	45	102	15	0	3	3	36
1998–99	Buffalo Sabres	NHL	81	7	26	33	96	21	4	11	15	22
1999–2000	Buffalo Sabres	NHL	74	2	11	13	95	4	0	0	0	8
2000–01	Buffalo Sabres	NHL	78	8	29	37	75	13	1	6	7	12
2001–02	Buffalo Sabres	NHL	82	1	33	34	80	—	—	—	—	—
2002–03	Buffalo Sabres	NHL	70	3	18	21	85	—	—	—	—	—
2003–04	Buffalo Sabres	NHL	68	4	24	28	102	—	—	—	—	—
2004–05	Ak Bars Kazan	RSL	23	1	8	9	30	4	0	0	0	2
2005–06	New York Islanders	NHL	59	5	24	29	88	—	—	—	—	—
2006–07	New York Islanders	NHL	30	2	9	11	40	—	—	—	—	—
2006–07	Philadelphia Flyers	NHL	31	3	10	13	38	—	—	—	—	—
2006–07	Atlanta Thrashers	NHL	18	2	12	14	14	4	0	0	0	4
2007–08	Atlanta Thrashers	NHL	65	3	5	8	58	—	—	—	—	—
2008–09	Dynamo Moscow	KHL	56	4	7	11	58	12	1	2	3	22
2009–10	Dynamo Moscow	KHL	56	0	7	7	60	—	—	—	—	—
USSR/CIS totals			113	6	15	21	106	8	0	0	0	8
NHL totals			1,085	96	375	471	1,268	98	9	30	39	168

=== International ===
Alexei Zhitnik
Medal record

Men's ice hockey

Representing Soviet Union

World Junior Championship
Silver medal – second place	1991 Saskatoon	Ice hockey

Representing CIS

World Junior Championship
Gold medal – first place	1992 Fũssen	Ice hockey

Olympic Games
Gold medal – first place	1992 Albertville	Ice hockey

Representing Russia

Olympic Games
Silver medal – second place	1998 Nagano	Ice hockey

Year	Team	Event	Result	GP	G	A	Pts	PIM
1990	Soviet Union	EJC	2nd place, silver medalist(s)	6	2	2	4	2
1991	Soviet Union	WJC	2nd place, silver medalist(s)	7	1	1	2	2
1991	Soviet Union	CC	5th	5	0	0	0	4
1992	CIS	WJC	1st place, gold medalist(s)	7	1	1	2	2
1992	Unified Team	OG	1st place, gold medalist(s)	8	1	0	1	0
1992	Russia	WC	5th	6	0	2	2	6
1994	Russia	WC	5th	6	1	0	1	8
1996	Russia	WC	4th	8	1	1	2	6
1996	Russia	WCH	SF	3	0	1	1	2
1998	Russia	OG	2nd place, silver medalist(s)	6	0	2	2	2
2000	Russia	WC	11th	6	0	1	1	2
2006	Russia	OG	4th	0	0	0	0	0
Junior totals				20	4	4	8	6
Senior totals				48	3	7	10	30

== Career transactions ==
- Selected by Los Angeles Kings in 1991 NHL Entry Draft. He was Los Angeles' fourth-round choice, 81st overall.
- Traded to Buffalo by Los Angeles Kings with Robb Stauber, Charlie Huddy and Los Angeles' fifth-round choice (Marian Menhart) in 1995 Entry Draft for Philippe Boucher, Denis Tsygurov and Grant Fuhr, February 14, 1995.
- Signed as a free agent by Kazan (Russia), December 6, 2004.
- Signed as a free agent by the New York Islanders, August 2, 2005.
- Traded to Philadelphia by the Islanders for Freddy Meyer and a conditional third-round draft pick on December 16, 2006.
- Traded to Atlanta by Philadelphia for defenseman Braydon Coburn on February 24, 2007

== See also ==
- List of NHL players with 1,000 games played
