= Freddy Meyer =

American ice hockey player

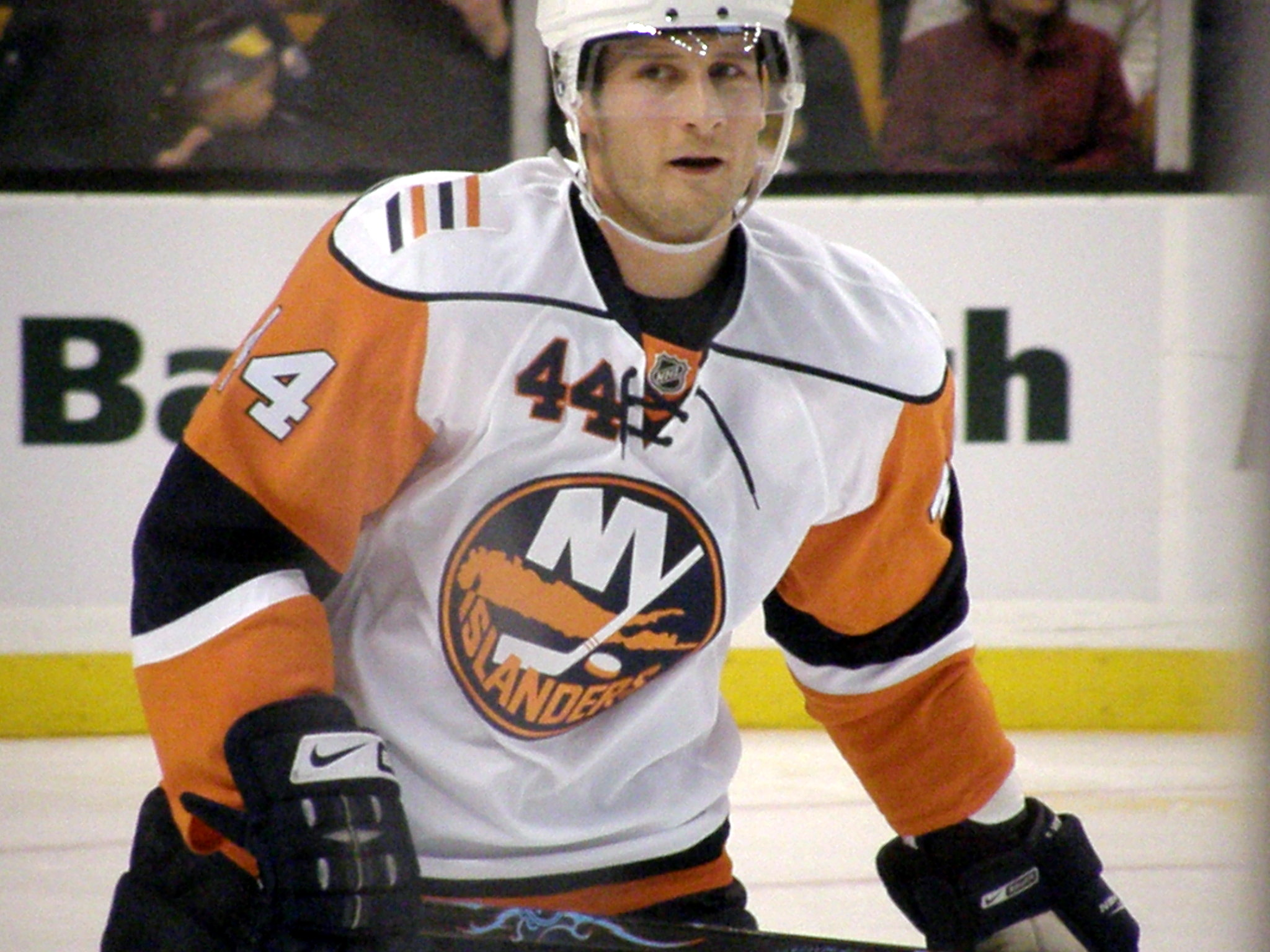
- Born: January 4, 1981 (age 45) Sanbornville, New Hampshire, U.S.
- Height: 5 ft 10 in (178 cm)
- Weight: 192 lb (87 kg; 13 st 10 lb)
- Position: Defense
- Shot: Left
- Played for: Philadelphia Flyers; New York Islanders; Phoenix Coyotes; Atlanta Thrashers; Modo Hockey
- National team: United States
- NHL draft: Undrafted
- Playing career: 2003–2012

Frederick A. Meyer IV (born January 4, 1981) is an American former professional ice hockey defenseman who played parts of seven seasons in the National Hockey League (NHL) for the Philadelphia Flyers, New York Islanders, Phoenix Coyotes, and Atlanta Thrashers. He is currently the head coach for The Rivers School of the Independent School League (ISL), where he coached his two sons Freddy Meyer IV and Carter Meyer.

== Playing career ==
As a youth, Meyer played in the 1994 and 1995 Quebec International Pee-Wee Hockey Tournaments with minor ice hockey teams from Beverly, Massachusetts and Syracuse, New York.

Meyer was signed by the Philadelphia Flyers on May 21, 2003 to an entry-level contract. He was previously an NCAA East First All-American team in 2002–03 at Boston University.

Meyer was a key defenseman during the Philadelphia Phantoms' Calder Cup-winning team in the 2004–05 AHL season.

On December 16, 2006, Meyer was traded along with a conditional 3rd-round draft pick to the New York Islanders in exchange for Alexei Zhitnik. He was claimed off waivers by the Phoenix Coyotes on October 8, 2007. On October 23, he cleared waivers and was sent to the San Antonio Rampage of the AHL. On November 10, he was reclaimed by the Islanders off of re-entry waivers.

On August 19, 2010, Meyer was signed by the Atlanta Thrashers to a one-year contract as an unrestricted free agent.

On June 18, 2011, following the completion of the 2010–11 season, Meyer left the NHL and signed a one-year deal with Modo Hockey of the Elitserien.

On August 28, 2012, Meyer retired from professional hockey, becoming an assistant coach with the Manchester Monarchs of the American Hockey League for two seasons. He would leave the Monarchs to be named as the head coach of the East Coast Wizards in the EHL.

== Career statistics ==
=== Regular season and playoffs ===
| | | | Regular season | | | | | Playoffs |
| Season | Team | League | GP | G | A | Pts | PIM | GP | G | A | Pts | PIM |
|---|---|---|---|---|---|---|---|---|---|---|---|---|
| 1999–00 | Boston University | HE | 25 | 1 | 11 | 12 | 52 | — | — | — | — | — |
| 2000–01 | Boston University | HE | 28 | 6 | 13 | 19 | 82 | — | — | — | — | — |
| 2001–02 | Boston University | HE | 37 | 5 | 15 | 20 | 78 | — | — | — | — | — |
| 2002–03 | Boston University | HE | 36 | 5 | 16 | 21 | 76 | — | — | — | — | — |
| 2003–04 | Philadelphia Phantoms | AHL | 59 | 14 | 14 | 28 | 50 | 12 | 0 | 3 | 3 | 8 |
| 2003–04 | Philadelphia Flyers | NHL | 1 | 0 | 0 | 0 | 0 | — | — | — | — | — |
| 2004–05 | Philadelphia Phantoms | AHL | 59 | 6 | 9 | 15 | 71 | 21 | 3 | 9 | 12 | 34 |
| 2005–06 | Philadelphia Phantoms | AHL | 11 | 3 | 3 | 6 | 22 | — | — | — | — | — |
| 2005–06 | Philadelphia Flyers | NHL | 57 | 6 | 21 | 27 | 33 | 6 | 0 | 1 | 1 | 8 |
| 2006–07 | Philadelphia Flyers | NHL | 25 | 2 | 3 | 5 | 14 | — | — | — | — | — |
| 2006–07 | New York Islanders | NHL | 35 | 0 | 3 | 3 | 24 | — | — | — | — | — |
| 2007–08 | Phoenix Coyotes | NHL | 5 | 0 | 0 | 0 | 0 | — | — | — | — | — |
| 2007–08 | San Antonio Rampage | AHL | 8 | 0 | 2 | 2 | 12 | — | — | — | — | — |
| 2007–08 | New York Islanders | NHL | 52 | 3 | 9 | 12 | 22 | — | — | — | — | — |
| 2008–09 | New York Islanders | NHL | 27 | 4 | 5 | 9 | 14 | — | — | — | — | — |
| 2009–10 | New York Islanders | NHL | 64 | 4 | 11 | 15 | 40 | — | — | — | — | — |
| 2010–11 | Atlanta Thrashers | NHL | 15 | 1 | 1 | 2 | 8 | — | — | — | — | — |
| 2011–12 | Modo Hockey | SEL | 31 | 3 | 9 | 12 | 55 | — | — | — | — | — |
| NHL totals | | | 281 | 20 | 53 | 73 | 155 | 6 | 0 | 1 | 1 | 8 |

=== International ===
| Year | Team | Event | Result | GP | G | A | Pts | PIM |
|---|---|---|---|---|---|---|---|---|
| 1999 | United States | WJC18 | 7th | 6 | 1 | 4 | 5 | 8 |
| 2001 | United States | WJC | 5th | 7 | 0 | 2 | 2 | 12 |
| 2006 | United States | WC | 7th | 7 | 0 | 0 | 0 | 6 |
| Junior totals | | | | 13 | 1 | 6 | 7 | 20 |
| Senior totals | | | | 7 | 0 | 0 | 0 | 6 |

== Awards and honors ==
| Award | Year |
|---|---|
College
| All-Hockey East Rookie Team | 1999–00 |
| All-Hockey East First Team | 2002–03 |
| AHCA East First-Team All-American | 2002–03 |
