= Sharangsky District =

Sharangsky District Шарангский район (Russian)
- District
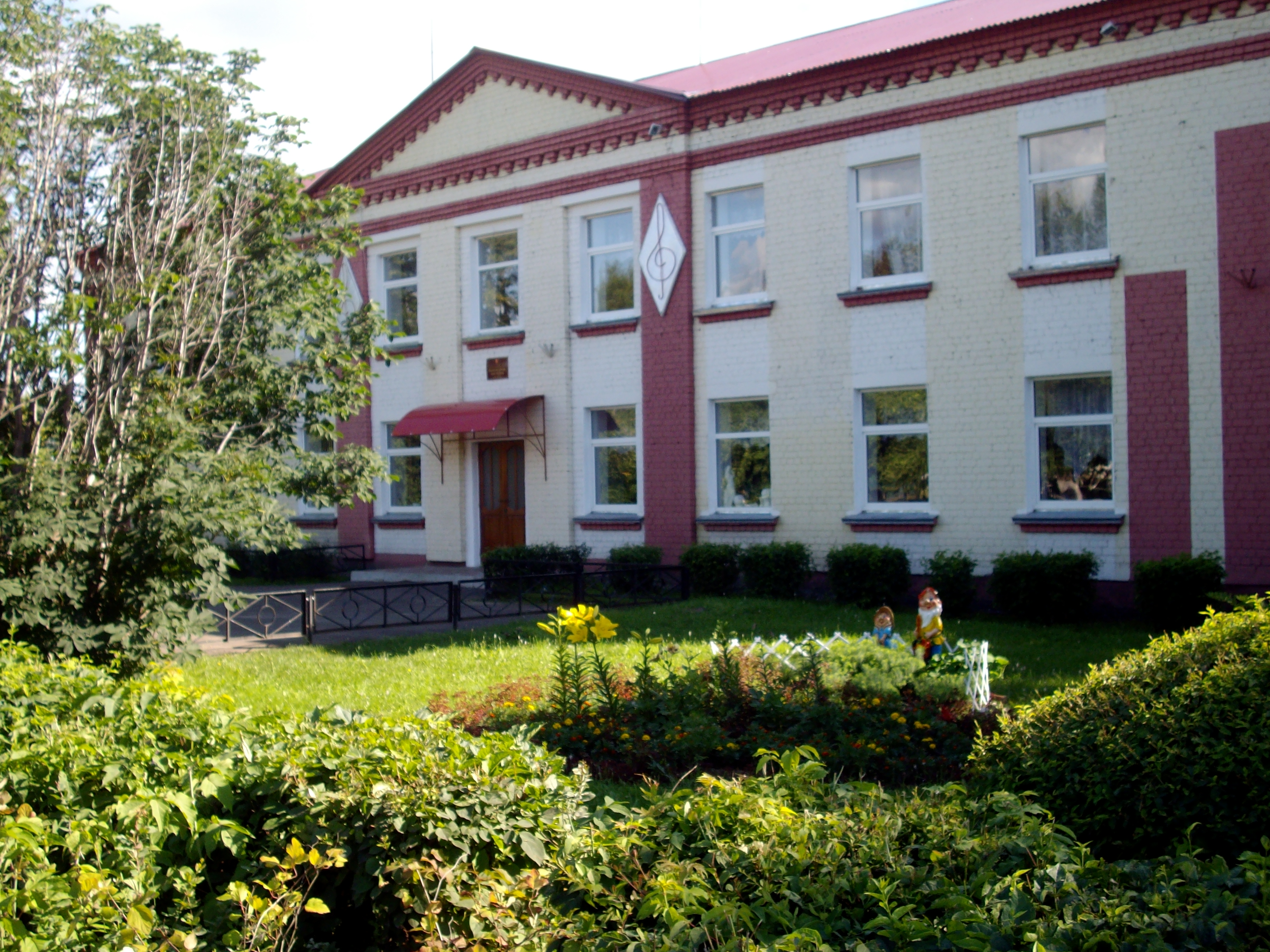
- Sharangara Children's Art School, Sharangsky District

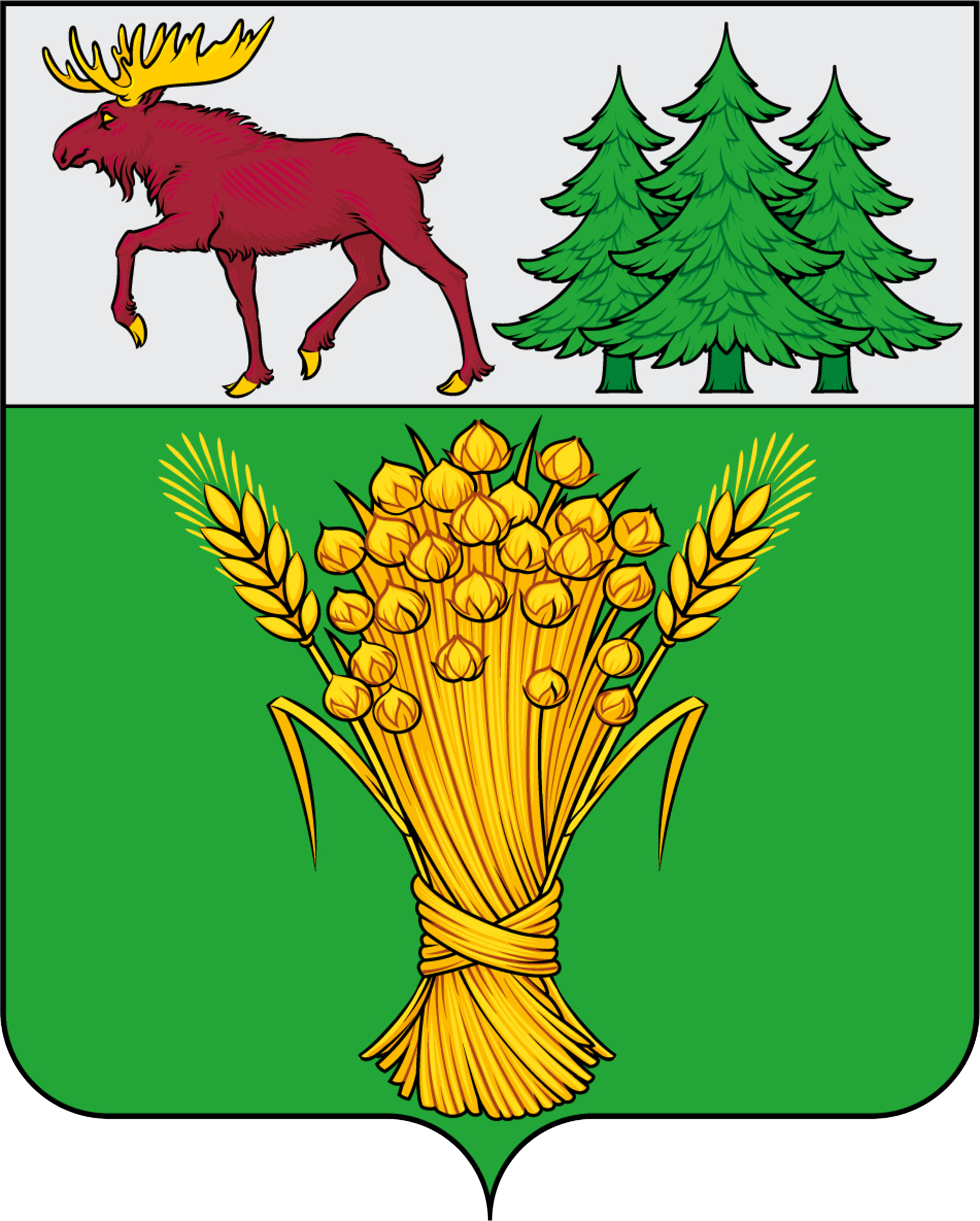
- Flag Coat of arms
- Location of Sharangsky District in Nizhny Novgorod Oblast
- Coordinates: 57°10′17″N 46°32′25″E
- Country: Russia
- Federal subject: Nizhny Novgorod Oblast
- Established: 1929
- Administrative center: Sharanga

Area
  - Total: 1,595.8 km^{2} (616.1 sq mi)

Population (2010 Census)
  - Total: 12,450
  - Density: 7.802/km^{2} (20.21/sq mi)
  - Urban: 52.7%
  - Rural: 47.3%

Administrative structure
  - Administrative divisions: 1 Work settlements, 7 Selsoviets
  - Inhabited localities: 1 urban-type settlements, 93 rural localities

Municipal structure
  - Municipally incorporated as: Sharangsky Municipal District
  - Municipal divisions: 1 urban settlements, 7 rural settlements
- Time zone: UTC+3 (MSK)
- OKTMO ID: 22656000
- Website: http://www.sharanga.nnov.ru

Sharangsky District (Russian: Шара́нгский райо́н) is an administrative district (raion), one of the forty in Nizhny Novgorod Oblast, Russia. Municipally, it is incorporated as Sharangsky Municipal District. It is located in the northeast of the oblast. The area of the district is 1,595.8 square kilometers (616.1 sq mi). Its administrative center is the urban locality (a work settlement) of Sharanga. Population: 12,450 (2010 Census); 13,743 (2002 census); 14,985 (1989 Soviet census). The population of Sharanga accounts for 52.7% of the district's total population.

== History ==
The district was established in 1929.
