= Denis Tsygurov =

- Born: February 26, 1971 Chelyabinsk, Soviet Union
- Died: January 10, 2015 (aged 43) Moscow, Russia
- Height: 6 ft 05 in (196 cm)
- Weight: 220 lb (100 kg; 15 st 10 lb)
- Position: Defence
- Shot: Left
- Played for: Buffalo Sabres; Los Angeles Kings
- National team: Russia
- NHL draft: 38th overall, 1993; Buffalo Sabres
- Playing career: 1989–2001

Denis Gennadievich Tsygurov (Russian: Денис Геннадьевич Цыгуров; February 26, 1971 – January 10, 2015) was a Russian professional ice hockey player. Tsygurov was drafted in the second round, 38th overall, by the Buffalo Sabres in the 1993 NHL entry draft following two seasons with HC Lada Togliatti of the Russian Hockey Super League. Tsygurov came to North America the following year and played in 24 games with the Rochester Americans of the American Hockey League and four games for the Sabres during the 1993–94 season. He was the son of Gennady Tsygurov, who was an ice hockey defenceman and coach in Russia; his elder brother, Dmitri Tsygurov also played at a high level.

Tsygurov returned to the Sabres during the 1994–95 season for four games before being involved in a blockbuster six-player deal with the Los Angeles Kings. Tsygurov was sent to the Kings along with future Hockey Hall of Famer Grant Fuhr and defenceman Philippe Boucher for defencemen Alexei Zhitnik and Charlie Huddy and goaltender Robb Stauber. Tsygurov went on to play in 39 games for the Kings over the next two seasons, amassing six points.

Following the 1995–96 season, Tsygurov returned to Europe, where, except for a brief stint with the Long Beach Ice Dogs in 1997–98, he spent the last five years of his pro career. Tsygurov's European stops included HC Opava in the Czech Extraliga, Kärpät in Finland's SM-liiga, CSK VVS Samara of the lower Russian league Vysshaya Liga, and HC Lada Togliatti and HC Neftekhimik Nizhnekamsk of the Russian Hockey Super League.

On January 10, 2015, Tsygurov died at the age of 43 of a heart attack. According to his father, his death may have been connected to excessive alcohol abuse and the strain caused by ongoing marital and financial problems.

== Career statistics ==
=== Regular season and playoffs ===
| | | | Regular season | | | | | Playoffs |
| Season | Team | League | GP | G | A | Pts | PIM | GP | G | A | Pts | PIM |
|---|---|---|---|---|---|---|---|---|---|---|---|---|
| 1988–89 | Traktor Chelyabinsk | Soviet | 8 | 0 | 0 | 0 | 2 | — | — | — | — | — |
| 1988–89 | Metallurg Chelyabinsk | USSR-2 | 24 | 2 | 3 | 5 | 16 | — | — | — | — | — |
| 1989–90 | Traktor Chelyabinsk | USSR | 27 | 0 | 1 | 1 | 18 | — | — | — | — | — |
| 1990–91 | Traktor Chelyabinsk | USSR | 28 | 0 | 0 | 0 | 12 | — | — | — | — | — |
| 1991–92 | Lada Togliatti | USSR | 29 | 3 | 2 | 5 | 6 | — | — | — | — | — |
| 1992–93 | Lada Togliatti | RUS | 37 | 7 | 13 | 20 | 29 | 10 | 1 | 1 | 2 | 6 |
| 1993–94 | Buffalo Sabres | NHL | 8 | 0 | 0 | 0 | 8 | — | — | — | — | — |
| 1993–94 | Rochester Americans | AHL | 24 | 1 | 10 | 11 | 10 | 1 | 0 | 1 | 1 | 0 |
| 1994–95 | Lada Togliatti | RUS | 10 | 3 | 7 | 10 | 6 | — | — | — | — | — |
| 1994–95 | Buffalo Sabres | NHL | 4 | 0 | 0 | 0 | 4 | — | — | — | — | — |
| 1994–95 | Los Angeles Kings | NHL | 21 | 0 | 0 | 0 | 11 | — | — | — | — | — |
| 1995–96 | Los Angeles Kings | NHL | 18 | 1 | 5 | 6 | 22 | — | — | — | — | — |
| 1995–96 | Phoenix Roadrunners | IHL | 17 | 1 | 3 | 4 | 10 | — | — | — | — | — |
| 1995–96 | Lada Togliatti | RUS | 3 | 0 | 0 | 0 | 4 | 2 | 1 | 0 | 1 | 2 |
| 1996–97 | Lada Togliatti | RUS | 8 | 2 | 1 | 3 | 0 | — | — | — | — | — |
| 1996–97 | HC Slezan Opava | CZE | 17 | 1 | 4 | 5 | 50 | — | — | — | — | — |
| 1996–97 | HC Karlovy Vary | CZE-2 | 19 | 6 | 12 | 18 | — | — | — | — | — | — |
| 1997–98 | Long Beach Ice Dogs | IHL | 15 | 1 | 4 | 5 | 8 | — | — | — | — | — |
| 1997–98 | Kärpät | FIN-2 | 15 | 2 | 7 | 9 | 106 | 7 | 0 | 4 | 4 | 6 |
| 1998–99 | Lada Togliatti | RUS | 20 | 0 | 2 | 2 | 22 | 7 | 3 | 0 | 3 | 6 |
| 1998–99 | Lada Togliatti-2 | RUS-4 | 2 | 1 | 1 | 2 | 0 | — | — | — | — | — |
| 1999–00 | Lada Togliatti | RUS | 13 | 3 | 4 | 7 | 24 | — | — | — | — | — |
| 1999–00 | CSK VVC Samara | RUS | 2 | 1 | 0 | 1 | 4 | — | — | — | — | — |
| 1999–00 | Neftekhimik Nizhnekamsk | RUS | 17 | 0 | 2 | 2 | 10 | — | — | — | — | — |
| 2000–01 | Avangard Omsk | RUS | 9 | 0 | 0 | 0 | 4 | — | — | — | — | — |
| NHL totals | | | 51 | 1 | 5 | 6 | 45 | — | — | — | — | — |
| USSR/RUS totals | | | 212 | 19 | 32 | 51 | 141 | 19 | 5 | 1 | 6 | 14 |
