= Vladimir Stepanov (armwrestler) =

Russian armwrestler (born 1958)

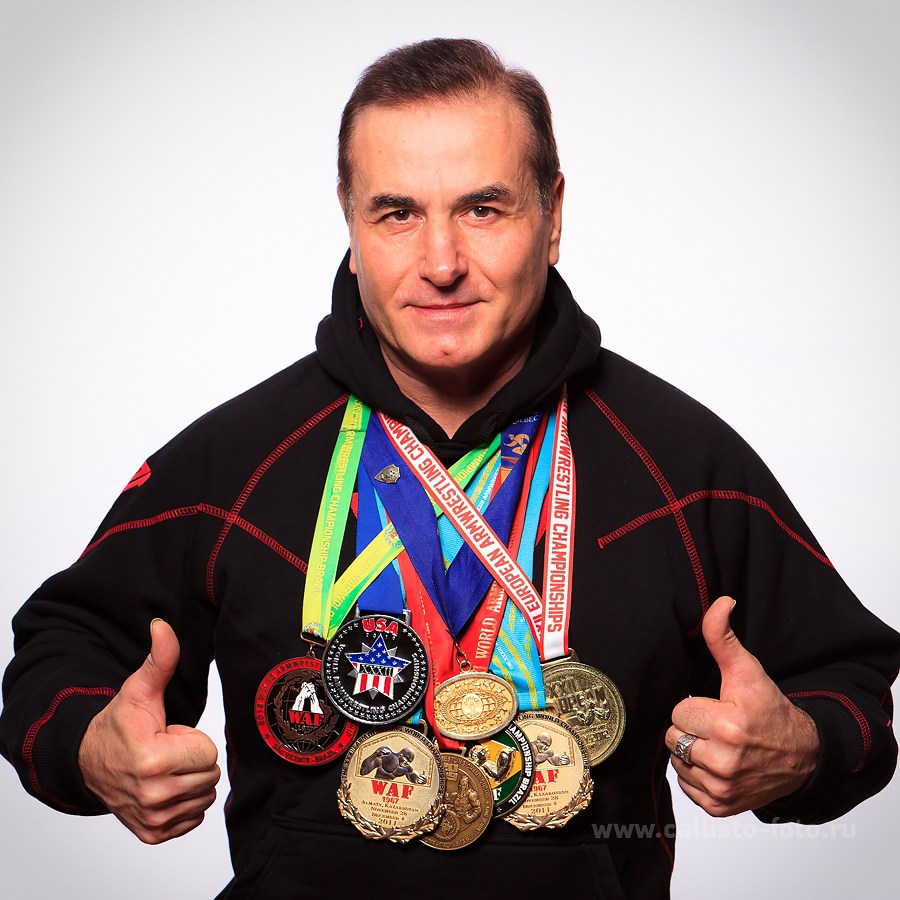
- Vladimir Stepanov in 2013 year

Personal information
- Nationality: Russian
- Born: 22 July 1958 (age 68) Kopeysk, Soviet Union
- Education: Russian Customs Academy
- Height: 1.81 m (5 ft 11 in)
- Weight: 100 kg (220 lb; 16 st)

Vladimir Alekseyevich Stepanov (Степанов, Владимир Алексеевич; born 1958) is a Russian armwrestler. He is one of the strongest Russian armwrestlers in Grand-master class (over 50 years of age), multiple world champion in less than 100 kg category. He is a current arm wrestling team member of Russian Federation and Sverdlovsk region.

Arm wrestling came to his life by accident. Vladimir Stepanov, alongside his childhood friend Vladimir Levitsky, visited some relatives in West Ukraine in August 1978. At approximately that time, World Arm wrestling Federation (WAF) started to create events. Arm wrestling was very popular in western part of the Soviet Union. Vladimir Stepanov and Vladimir Levitsky were invited to participate in minor amateur tournaments. All opponents were defeated because by then both Vladimirs were well trained weightlifters. From 1997 and until now, Vladimir Stepanov started participating in major competitions across Ural region, Russia and worldwide. From 1997 to 2001 Vladimir had trained in Nizhny Tagil, Sverdlovsk Oblast. Since 2002 he has trained in Yekaterinburg under supervision of Ivan Getmansky.

== Biography ==
Stepanov was born on 22 July 1958 in Kopeysk, Russia. From 1977 to 1983, he was studying at Ural State University of Railway Transport in Yekaterinburg. At that time he got involved in weightlifting under coaching of Nikolai Guselnikov. After graduating as a railway engineer, Vladimir Stepanov also graduated from Russian Customs Academy in 1999, Moscow and got a degree of Manager of Customs, Diploma with Honors. From 1990 to 2006 Vladimir Stepanov had worked at The Federal Customs Service of Russia in Ural region. Since 2007 Vladimir Stepanov has worked at the Federal Service for Ecological, Technological and Nuclear Supervision.

== Sport achievements ==
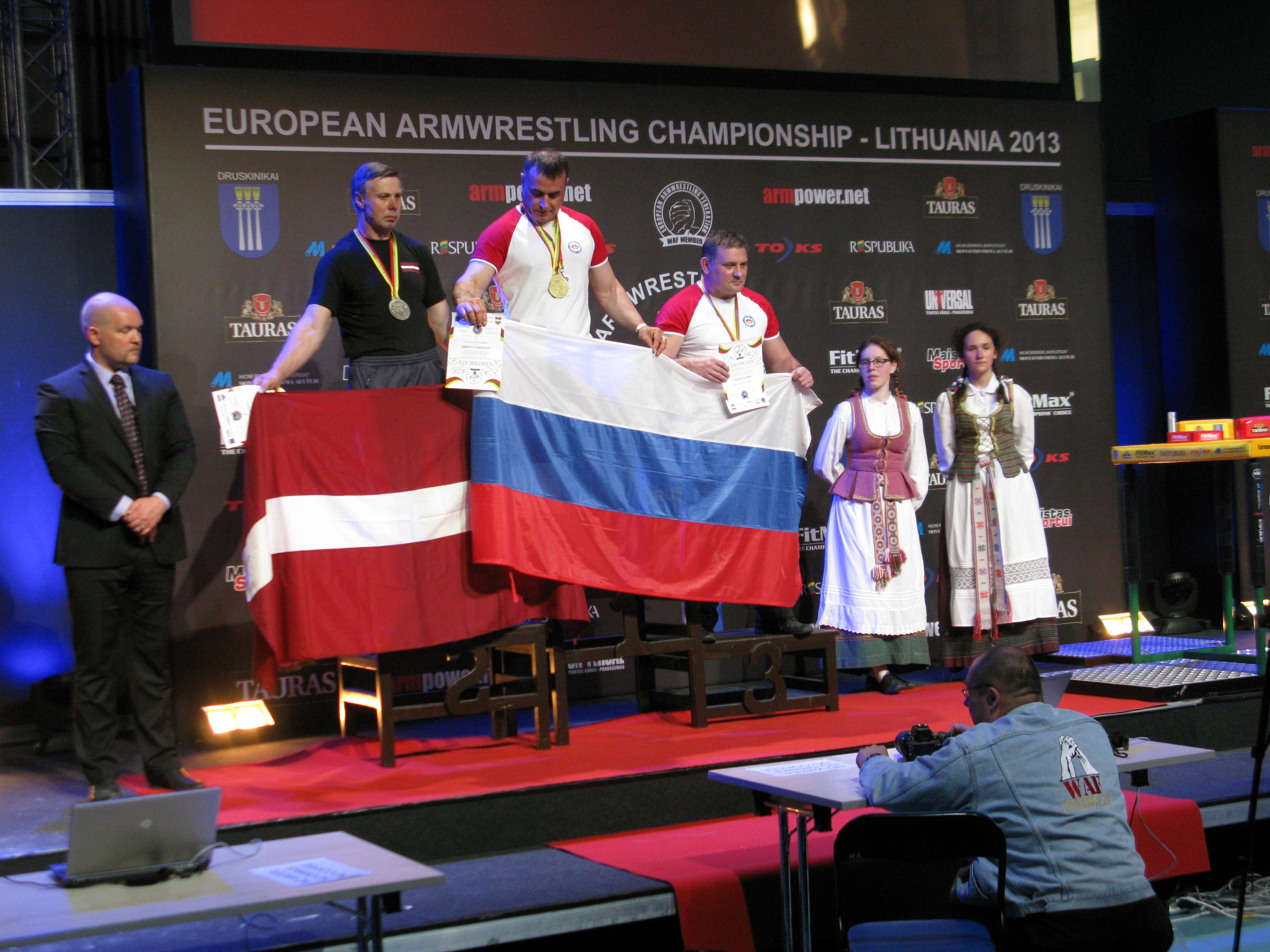
XXIII Europe Arm wrestling Championship, Druskininkai, Lithuania 2013 year

2001:

- IX World Police and Fire Games Indianapolis, United States – silver medal for the right arm pulling in 102 kg and over category, master class.

2002:

- XI Arm Wrestling Championship of Russian Federation in Kazan, Russia – 4 place in snatch, second for the left arm pulling, fourth for the right arm pulling in 95 kg and over category, master class.

2003:

- IX World Police and Fire Games Barcelona, Spain – silver medal for the right arm pulling in less than 113 kg category, master class.

2004:

- XIII Arm Wrestling Championship of Russian Federation in Moscow – two silver medals in snatch for the left and right arms pulling in 95 kg and over category, master class.

2005:

- XI World Police and Fire Games Quebec City, Canada – gold medal for the right arm pulling in before 113 kg category, master class.

2009:

- XXXI World Arm wrestling Championship, Porto Viro, Italy – bronze medal for the right arm pulling in 90 kg and over category, Grand-master class.

2010:

- XIX Arm wrestling Championship of Russian Federation, Moscow – gold medal in snatch in 90 kg and over category, Grand-master class.
- XX Europe Arm wrestling Championship, Moscow – bronze medals for the right and left arms pulling in 90 kg and over category, Grand-master class.
- XXXII World Arm wrestling Championship, Las Vegas, United States – gold medal for the left arm pulling and fourth place for the right arm pulling in less than 100 kg category, Grand-master class.

2011:

- XX Arm wrestling Championship of Russian Federation, Moscow – gold medal in snatch in less than 100 kg category, Grand-master class.
- XXI Europe Arm wrestling Championship, Antalya, Turkey – gold and silver medals in snatch in less than 100 kg category, Grand-master class.
- XXXIII World Arm wrestling Championship, Almaty, Kazakhstan – two gold medals in snatch in less than 100 kg category, Grand-master class.

2012:

- XXI Arm wrestling Championship of Russian Federation, Moscow – gold medal in snatch in less than 100 kg category, Grand-master class.
- XXII Europe Arm wrestling Championship, Gdańsk, Poland – two gold medals in snatch in less than 100 kg category, Grand-master class.
- XXXIV World Arm wrestling Championship, São Vicente, Brazil – gold and bronze medals in snatch in less than 100 kg category, Grand-master class.

2013:

- XXII Arm wrestling Championship of Russian Federation, Ramenskoye – two gold medals in snatch in less than 100 kg category, Grand-master class.
- XXIII Europe Arm wrestling Championship, Druskininkai, Lithuania]– gold medal for the left arm pulling and 6 place for the right arm pulling in less than 100 kg category, Grand-master class.
- XXXV World Arm wrestling Championship, Gdynia, Poland – gold and bronze medals in snatch in less than 100 kg category, Grand-master class.

2014:

- XXIII Arm wrestling Championship of Russian Federation, Ramenskoye – first place in the double-event, in less than 100 kg category, Grand-master class.
- XXIV Europe Arm wrestling Championship, Azerbaijan, Baku – two bronze medals in snatch in less than 100 kg category, Grand-master class.
- XXXVI World Arm wrestling Championship, Vilnius, Lithuania – 6 in the fight with his right hand, in the weight category up to 100 kg grand-master class.

2015:

- XXIV Arm wrestling Championship of Russian Federation, Ramenskoye – gold medal in the fight with his left hand, in less than 100 kg category, Grand-master class.
- XXXVII World Championships in armsportu, Malaysia, Kuala Lumpur – bronze medal in the fight with his left hand, the 6th place in the fight with his right hand, in the weight category up to 100 kg of grand-master class.

2016:

- XXV Arm wrestling Championship of Russian Federation, Ramenskoye – first place in the sum of the biathlon, in the weight category up to 100 kg grand master class.
- XXXVIII World Arm wrestling Championship, Blagoevgrad, Bulgaria – gold medal in the fight with the right hand, a silver medal in the fight with the left hand, in the weight category up to 100 kg grand master class.

2018:

- XXVII Arm wrestling Championship of Russian Federation, Protvino – gold medals in the fight left and right hand in the weight category up to 100 kg grand master class, senior grand-master class.
- XXVIII Europe Arm wrestling Championship, Sofia, Bulgaria – gold medals in the fight left hand in the weight category up to 100 kg senior grand-master class.
- XL World Arm wrestling Championship, Antalya, Turkey – gold medals in the fight left hand in the weight category up to 100 kg senior grand-master class.

2019:

- XXVIII Arm wrestling Championship of Russian Federation (Yekaterinburg) – gold and bronze medals in the struggle with left and right hands in the weight category up to 100 kg senior grand-master class, grand-master class.
- XXIX Europe Arm wrestling Championship Greece (Loutraki) – gold medals in the fight with left and right hands in the weight category up to 100 kg, senior grand-master class;
