= Evgeny Katichev =

Russian ice hockey player

- Born: September 3, 1986 (age 38); Chelyabinsk, Russian SFSR
- Height: 6 ft 0 in (183 cm)
- Weight: 207 lb (94 kg; 14 st 11 lb)
- Position: Defence
- Shot: Left
- KHL team Former teams: Free Agent; HC MVD; Traktor Chelyabinsk; Neftekhimik Nizhnekamsk; HC Vityaz
- Playing career: 2005–2023

Evgeny Katichev (born September 3, 1986) is a Russian professional ice hockey defenceman currently an unrestricted free agent who most recently played for HC Vityaz in the Kontinental Hockey League (KHL). He has formerly played in the KHL with HC MVD, Traktor Chelyabinsk and Neftekhimik Nizhnekamsk.

== Career statistics ==
			Regular season					Playoffs
Season	Team	League	GP	G	A	Pts	PIM	GP	G	A	Pts	PIM
2002–03	Mechel Chelyabinsk-2	Russia3	2	0	0	0	2	—	—	—	—	—
2003–04	Mechel Chelyabinsk-2	Russia3	44	1	3	4	36	—	—	—	—	—
2004–05	Mechel Chelyabinsk-2	Russia3	54	1	5	6	46	—	—	—	—	—
2005–06	HK MVD	Russia	5	0	0	0	2	4	1	0	1	4
2005–06	HK MVD-THK Tver	Russia3	55	2	13	15	146	—	—	—	—	—
2006–07	HK MVD	Russia	13	0	1	1	14	—	—	—	—	—
2006–07	HK MVD Balashikha-2	Russia4	4	0	3	3	12	—	—	—	—	—
2007–08	HK MVD	Russia	18	0	0	0	18	2	0	0	0	2
2007–08	HK MVD Balashikha-2	Russia3	9	1	2	3	59	—	—	—	—	—
2008–09	HK MVD	KHL	7	0	0	0	12	—	—	—	—	—
2008–09	Kristall Elektrostal	Russia2	20	2	7	9	44	—	—	—	—	—
2008–09	HK Dmitrov	Russia2	27	1	7	8	42	13	0	2	2	8
2009–10	Mechel Chelyabinsk	Russia2	18	0	0	0	16	—	—	—	—	—
2009–10	Gazovik Tyumen	Russia2	12	0	1	1	24	—	—	—	—	—
2009–10	Traktor Chelyabinsk	KHL	4	0	0	0	0	4	0	0	0	2
2010–11	Traktor Chelyabinsk	KHL	31	1	3	4	56	—	—	—	—	—
2011–12	Traktor Chelyabinsk	KHL	46	0	3	3	36	16	1	1	2	14
2012–13	Traktor Chelyabinsk	KHL	49	3	7	10	73	25	0	0	0	26
2013–14	Traktor Chelyabinsk	KHL	53	1	5	6	100	—	—	—	—	—
2014–15	Traktor Chelyabinsk	KHL	27	0	1	1	48	—	—	—	—	—
2015–16	HC Neftekhimik Nizhnekamsk	KHL	—	—	—	—	—	—	—	—	—	—
2016–17	HC Vityaz Podolsk	KHL	57	1	3	4	44	4	0	0	0	2
2017–18	HC Vityaz Podolsk	KHL	45	0	1	1	63	—	—	—	—	—
2018–19	HC Vityaz Podolsk	KHL	55	0	2	2	46	4	0	0	0	0
2019–20	HC Vityaz Podolsk	KHL	42	0	0	0	20	3	0	0	0	2
2020–21	HC Vityaz Podolsk	KHL	19	0	0	0	18	—	—	—	—	—
2022–23	AKM Tula Region	VHL	26	1	4	5	12	—	—	—	—	—
2022–23	Chelmet Chelyabinsk	VHL	14	0	0	0	33	4	0	0	0	0
KHL totals			435	6	25	31	516	56	1	1	2	46
