= Gennady Tsygurov =

Russian ice hockey player and coach

- Born: 15 April 1942; Chelyabinsk, Soviet Union
- Died: 14 December 2016 (aged 74); Tolyatti, Russia
- Position: Defence
- Played for: Traktor Chelyabinsk
- Playing career: 1959–1977

Gennady Fedorovich Tsygurov (Russian: Геннадий Фёдорович Цыгу́ров; 14 April 1942 – 14 December 2016) was a Russian professional ice hockey coach and player. He played for Traktor Chelyabinsk from 1959 to 1977 in the Soviet Championship League. From 1979 to 1984, he then served as head coach of Traktor. Tsygurov also served as the coach of SC Uritskogo Kazan, Avangard Omsk, Lada Togliatti. HK MVD Balashikha, Kristall Saratov and Saryarka Karaganda. He was the father of the late professional ice hockey player Denis Tsygurov (1971–2015); another son Dmitri Tsygurov also played at a high level.
