= Fokino Urban Okrug =

Location of Bryansk Oblast in Russia

Location of Primorsky Krai in Russia

Fokino Urban Okrug is the name of several municipal formations in Russia. The following administrative divisions are incorporated as such:

- Town of Fokino, Bryansk Oblast
- Closed Administrative-Territorial Formation of Fokino, Primorsky Krai
