= Konstantin Lyzhin =

Russian footballer

Personal information
- Full name: Konstantin Vitalyevich Lyzhin
- Date of birth: 19 February 1974 (age 52)
- Place of birth: Chelyabinsk, Russian SFSR
- Height: 1.86 m (6 ft 1 in)
- Position: Defender

Senior career*
Years	Team	Apps	(Gls)
1992	FC Signal Chelyabinsk (amateur)		
1992–1993	FC Zenit Chelyabinsk	41	(1)
1994–1995	FC Uralmash Yekaterinburg	1	(0)
1994–1995	→ FC Uralmash-d Yekaterinburg (loans)	31	(5)
1996	FC Uralets Nizhny Tagil	22	(0)
1997	FC Irtysh Tobolsk	33	(3)
1998–2005	FC Zenit Chelyabinsk	185	(6)
- * Club domestic league appearances and goals

Konstantin Vitalyevich Lyzhin (Russian: Константин Витальевич Лыжин; born 19 February 1974) is a former Russian football player.

Lyzhin made one appearance in the Russian Premier League with FC Uralmash Yekaterinburg.
