= Maksim Fokin =

Russian footballer

Personal information
- Full name: Maksim Vladimirovich Fokin
- Date of birth: 27 June 1982 (age 44)
- Place of birth: Moscow, Russian SFSR
- Height: 1.91 m (6 ft 3 in)
- Position: Midfielder

Youth career
- FShM-Torpedo Moscow

Senior career*
Years	Team	Apps	(Gls)
2000	FC Torpedo-2 Moscow	25	(0)
2000–2003	FC Torpedo Moscow	0	(0)
2004	FC Tobol	28	(0)
2005–2006	FC KAMAZ Naberezhnye Chelny	17	(0)
2006	FC Fakel Voronezh	11	(1)
2007	FC Aktobe-Lento	17	(0)
2008	FC Kairat	2	(0)
- * Club domestic league appearances and goals

Maksim Vladimirovich Fokin (Russian: Максим Владимирович Фокин; born 27 June 1982) is a Russian former professional footballer.

== Club career ==
He made his debut for FC Torpedo Moscow on 1 April 2003 in a Russian Premier League Cup game against FC Dynamo Moscow, and appeared in two more games in the tournament.

He played three seasons in the Russian Football National League for FC KAMAZ Naberezhnye Chelny and FC Fakel Voronezh.

== See also ==
- Football in Russia
