= Alexander Budkin =

Russian ice hockey player (born 1986)

- Born: September 8, 1986 (age 39) Chelyabinsk, Russian SFSR, Soviet Union
- Height: 6 ft 5 in (196 cm)
- Weight: 209 lb (95 kg; 14 st 13 lb)
- Position: Defence
- Shoots: Right
- VHL team Former teams: Lada Togliatti; Traktor Chelyabinsk; Dynamo Moscow; Severstal Cherepovets; Spartak Moscow; Torpedo Nizhny Novgorod; Metallurg Magnitogorsk; HC Sochi
- NHL draft: Undrafted
- Playing career: 2005–present

Alexander Budkin (Russian: Александр Эльгизарович Будкин; born September 8, 1986) is a Russian professional ice hockey defenceman who is currently playing for HC Lada Togliatti in the Supreme Hockey League (VHL).

== Playing career ==
Budkin began his professional career in 2003 playing for Traktor in his birth town of Chelyabinsk. After a year he moved to Kristall Saratov, then on to Dynamo Moscow. He remained at Dynamo Moscow until 2009 when he returned to Chelyabinsk for the 2009/10 season, although he had to open the season with Dynamo. The following year he played just six games for Severstal Cherepovets before being traded to Spartak Moscow. In May 2013 he signed a contract to return to Dynamo Moscow.

In 2013 he joined Dynamo Moscow of the KHL, from Spartak Moscow. In November 2013 it was confirmed that he is being loaned to Russian Major League team Dynamo Balashikha.

Budkin was part of the winning Dynamo Moscow team for the 2008 Spengler Cup.

== Career statistics ==
			Regular season					Playoffs
Season	Team	League	GP	G	A	Pts	PIM	GP	G	A	Pts	PIM
2003–04	Traktor Chelyabinsk	Rus-2	—	—	—	—	—	2	1	0	1	14
2004–05	Kristall Saratov	Rus-2	6	1	0	1	4	4	0	0	0	0
2005–06	Dynamo Moscow	RSL	34	1	1	2	12	—	—	—	—	—
2006–07	Dynamo Moscow	RSL	29	0	1	1	20	—	—	—	—	—
2007–08	Dynamo Moscow	RSL	32	0	3	3	28	9	0	2	2	2
2008–09	Dynamo Moscow	KHL	15	0	3	3	10	—	—	—	—	—
2009–10	Dynamo Moscow	KHL	9	0	1	1	4	—	—	—	—	—
2009–10	Traktor Chelyabinsk	KHL	36	3	2	5	16	4	0	1	1	2
2010–11	Severstal Cherepovets	KHL	6	0	0	0	8	—	—	—	—	—
2010–11	Spartak Moscow	KHL	29	2	8	10	10	4	0	1	1	2
2011–12	Spartak Moscow	KHL	43	2	6	8	6	—	—	—	—	—
2012–13	Spartak Moscow	KHL	11	1	0	1	2	—	—	—	—	—
2013–14	Dynamo Moscow	KHL	4	0	0	0	2	—	—	—	—	—
2013–14	Dynamo Balashikha	VHL	28	4	3	7	16	5	0	3	3	0
2014–15	Dynamo Moscow	KHL	15	3	2	5	2	—	—	—	—	—
2014–15	Dynamo Balashikha	VHL	17	0	6	6	6	—	—	—	—	—
2015–16	Torpedo Nizhny Novgorod	KHL	45	6	3	9	22	11	1	2	3	6
2016–17	Torpedo Nizhny Novgorod	KHL	8	0	0	0	4	—	—	—	—	—
2016–17	Metallurg Magnitogorsk	KHL	25	0	0	0	4	5	0	0	0	2
2017–18	Metallurg Magnitogorsk	KHL	17	0	1	1	2	—	—	—	—	—
2018–19	HC Sochi	KHL	31	0	1	1	6	6	0	1	1	0
KHL totals			294	17	27	44	98	30	1	5	6	12
