= Vladislav Fokin =

Russian ice hockey player (born 1986)

- Born: 8 June 1986 (age 39) Chelyabinsk, Russian SFSR
- Height: 6 ft 2 in (188 cm)
- Weight: 212 lb (96 kg; 15 st 2 lb)
- Position: Goaltender
- Caught: Left
- Played for: Traktor Chelyabinsk; HC Yugra; HK SKP Poprad; Dizel Penza; PSK Sakhalin
- Playing career: 2004–2020

Vladislav Igorevich Fokin (born 8 June 1986) is a Russian former professional ice hockey goaltender. He most recently played for PSK Sakhalin of Asia League Ice Hockey. Fokin originally made his debut in the Kontinental Hockey League (KHL) with Traktor Chelyabinsk. On 10 May 2015, after spending his entire professional career with Traktor Chelyabinsk, Fokin moved to fellow KHL club HC Yugra in search for a starting role.
