= Yuri Koksharov =

Russian ice hockey player

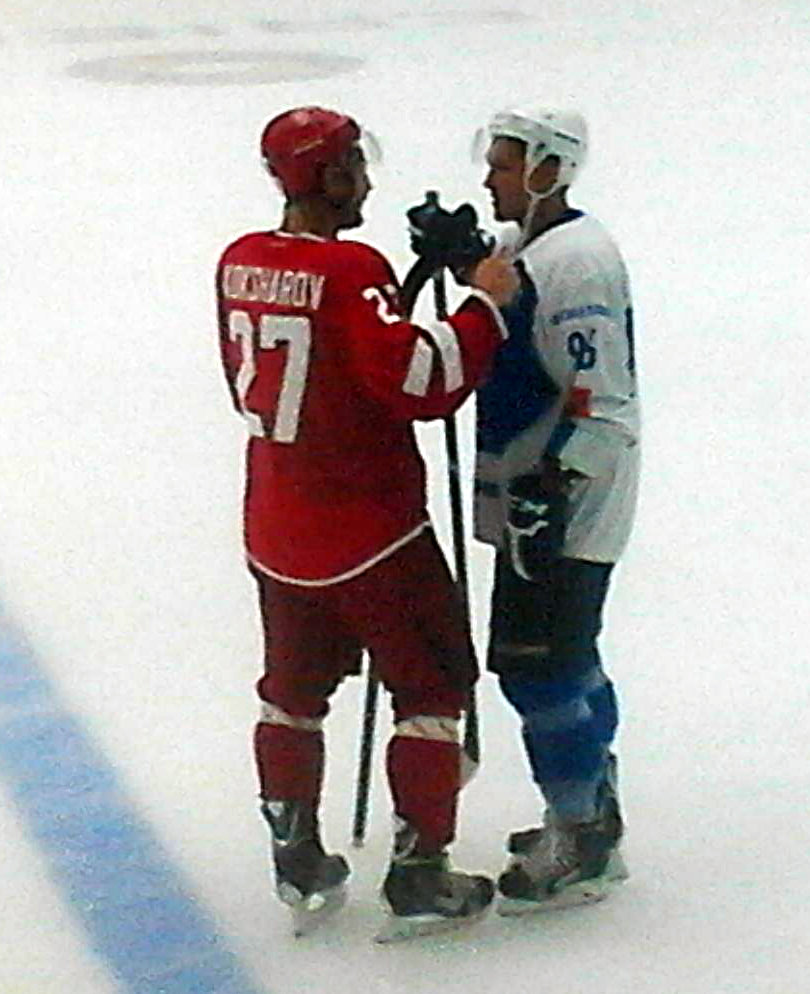
- Born: October 1, 1985 (age 39); Chelyabinsk, Russian SFSR
- Height: 6 ft 0 in (183 cm)
- Weight: 205 lb (93 kg; 14 st 9 lb)
- Position: Centre
- Shoots: Left
- KAZ team Former teams: Arlan Kokshetau; Amur Khabarovsk; Metallurg Novokuznetsk; HC Vityaz
- Playing career: 2002–present

Yuri Koksharov (born October 1, 1985) is a Russian professional ice hockey centre who currently plays for Arlan Kokshetau in the Kazakhstan Hockey League. He previously played four seasons with HC Vityaz of the Kontinental Hockey League (KHL).

== Career statistics ==
			Regular season					Playoffs
Season	Team	League	GP	G	A	Pts	PIM	GP	G	A	Pts	PIM
2001–02	Traktor Chelyabinsk-2	Russia3	5	0	0	0	2	—	—	—	—	—
2002–03	Amur Khabarovsk-2	Russia3	47	13	9	22	32	—	—	—	—	—
2003–04	Amur Khabarovsk-2	Russia3	45	10	14	24	46	—	—	—	—	—
2004–05	Golden Amur	Asia League	41	13	13	26	80	2	0	0	0	0
2005–06	Zauralie Kurgan	Russia2	45	7	13	20	66	—	—	—	—	—
2006–07	Zauralie Kurgan	Russia2	56	6	16	22	60	4	1	2	3	4
2007–08	Kristall Saratov	Russia2	56	19	31	50	52	—	—	—	—	—
2007–08	Kristall Saratov-2	Russia3	5	0	3	3	4	—	—	—	—	—
2007–08	HC Lada Togliatti-2	Russia3	2	2	1	3	6	8	1	4	5	16
2008–09	Yugra Khanty-Mansiysk	Russia2	54	19	15	34	70	16	5	4	9	8
2009–10	Amur Khabarovsk	KHL	49	7	4	11	46	—	—	—	—	—
2010–11	Amur Khabarovsk	KHL	37	1	5	6	38	—	—	—	—	—
2011–12	Metallurg Novokuznetsk	KHL	1	0	0	0	0	—	—	—	—	—
2011–12	Yermak Angarsk	VHL	13	0	7	7	8	—	—	—	—	—
2011–12	HC Donbass-2	Ukraine	8	4	5	9	8	—	—	—	—	—
2012–13	Toros Neftekamsk	VHL	42	9	14	23	22	19	7	7	14	24
2013–14	HC Vityaz Podolsk	KHL	42	1	14	15	67	—	—	—	—	—
2014–15	HC Vityaz Podolsk	KHL	24	4	3	7	24	—	—	—	—	—
2015–16	HC Vityaz Podolsk	KHL	45	5	7	12	61	—	—	—	—	—
2016–17	HC Vityaz Podolsk	KHL	26	3	0	3	14	—	—	—	—	—
2017–18	Arlan Kokshetau	Kazakhstan	11	1	4	5	12	—	—	—	—	—
2017–18	Metallurg Novokuznetsk	VHL	41	7	10	17	71	8	2	0	2	20
2018–19	Dizel Penza	VHL	56	14	10	24	56	—	—	—	—	—
2019–20	HK Gomel	Belarus	52	13	23	36	66	7	4	1	5	2
KHL totals			224	21	33	54	250	—	—	—	—	—
Russia2 totals			211	51	75	126	248	20	6	6	12	12
VHL totals			152	30	41	71	157	27	9	7	16	44
