= Egor Dugin =

Russian ice hockey player (born 1990)

- Born: November 4, 1990 (age 35) Chelyabinsk, Russian SFSR, Soviet Union
- Height: 5 ft 11 in (180 cm)
- Weight: 190 lb (86 kg; 13 st 8 lb)
- Position: Centre
- Shoots: Right
- KHL team Former teams: Free Agent; Traktor Chelyabinsk; Dynamo Moscow; Admiral Vladivostok; Torpedo Nizhny Novgorod; Sibir Novosibirsk; HC Sochi; Kunlun Red Star
- Playing career: 2008–present

Yegor Dugin (born November 4, 1990) is a Russian professional ice hockey centre who is currently an unrestricted free agent who most recently played for HC Kunlun Red Star in the Kontinental Hockey League (KHL).

Dugin made his KHL debut with Traktor Chelyabinsk in the 2009–10 season. After Dugin was traded to Dynamo during the 2013–14 season, he was signed to a three-year contract extension on April 17, 2014.
