= Konstantin Gorbatov =

Russian painter

Konstantin Ivanovich Gorbatov
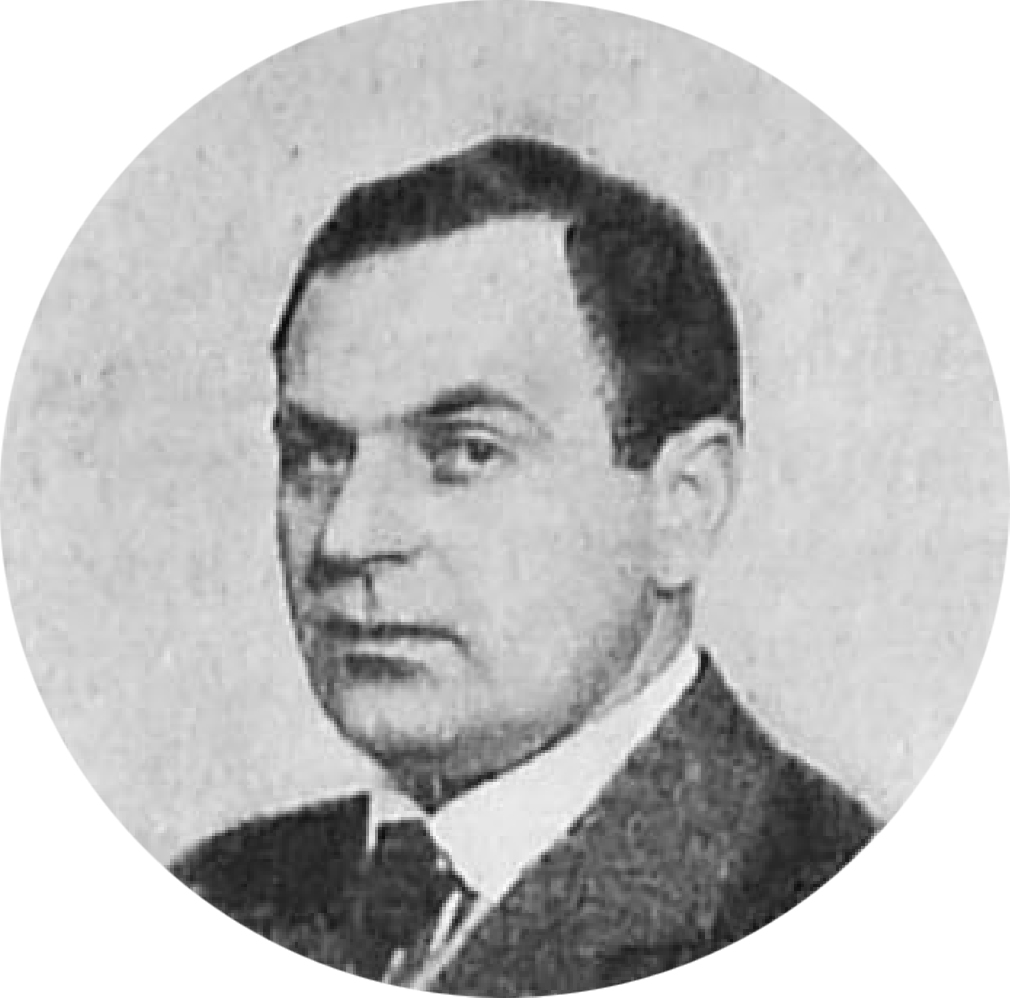
- Gorbatov at 36, Niva magazine, No. 07, 1912, the most popular magazine of late-19th-century Russia.
- Born: May 17, 1876; Stavropol, Russia
- Died: May 24, 1945 (aged 69); Berlin, Germany
- Education: Baron Stieglitz Central School for Technical Draftsmanship, Imperial Academy of Arts; painting studies under Nikolay Nikanorovich Dubovskoy
- Known for: painting
- Movement: post-impressionist

Konstantin Ivanovich Gorbatov (Russian: Константин Иванович Горбатов; 17 May [O.S. 5 May] 1876 – 24 May 1945) was a Russian Post-Impressionist painter.

== Career ==
Gorbatov launched his career by exhibiting in a St. Petersburg show with the Peredvizhniki, or "Wanderers," a group of Russian realist artists who rejected the academic restrictions of their time to create accessible art that reflected both the lives and struggles of ordinary people and the beauty of Russian life.

Following the Russian Revolution of 1917, Gorbatov left Russia permanently in 1922, first settling in Capri then relocating permanently to Berlin in 1926. After establishing a career and some renown, Gorbatov joined a Russian émigré art group that included Leonid Pasternak, Vadim Falileyev and Ivan Myasoyedov.

During the late 1930s, Gorbatov traveled throughout Europe, visiting Palestine and Syria in 1934 and 1935, with frequent stops in Italy. All that ended, however, when his work was deemed "unneeded" during the Nazi regime, effectively ending his career.

== Education ==
From 1896 to 1903, Gorbatov studied civil engineering before focusing on painting in Riga, Latvia. In 1904, he moved to St. Petersburg and studied at the Baron Stieglitz Central School for Technical Draftsmanship. Later, at the Imperial Academy of Arts, he entered the architecture department before switching to painting, and studying under landscape painter Nikolay Nikanorovich Dubovskoy. A scholarship brought him to Rome and Capri for additional study.

== Representative work ==
(Selection was limited by availability.)

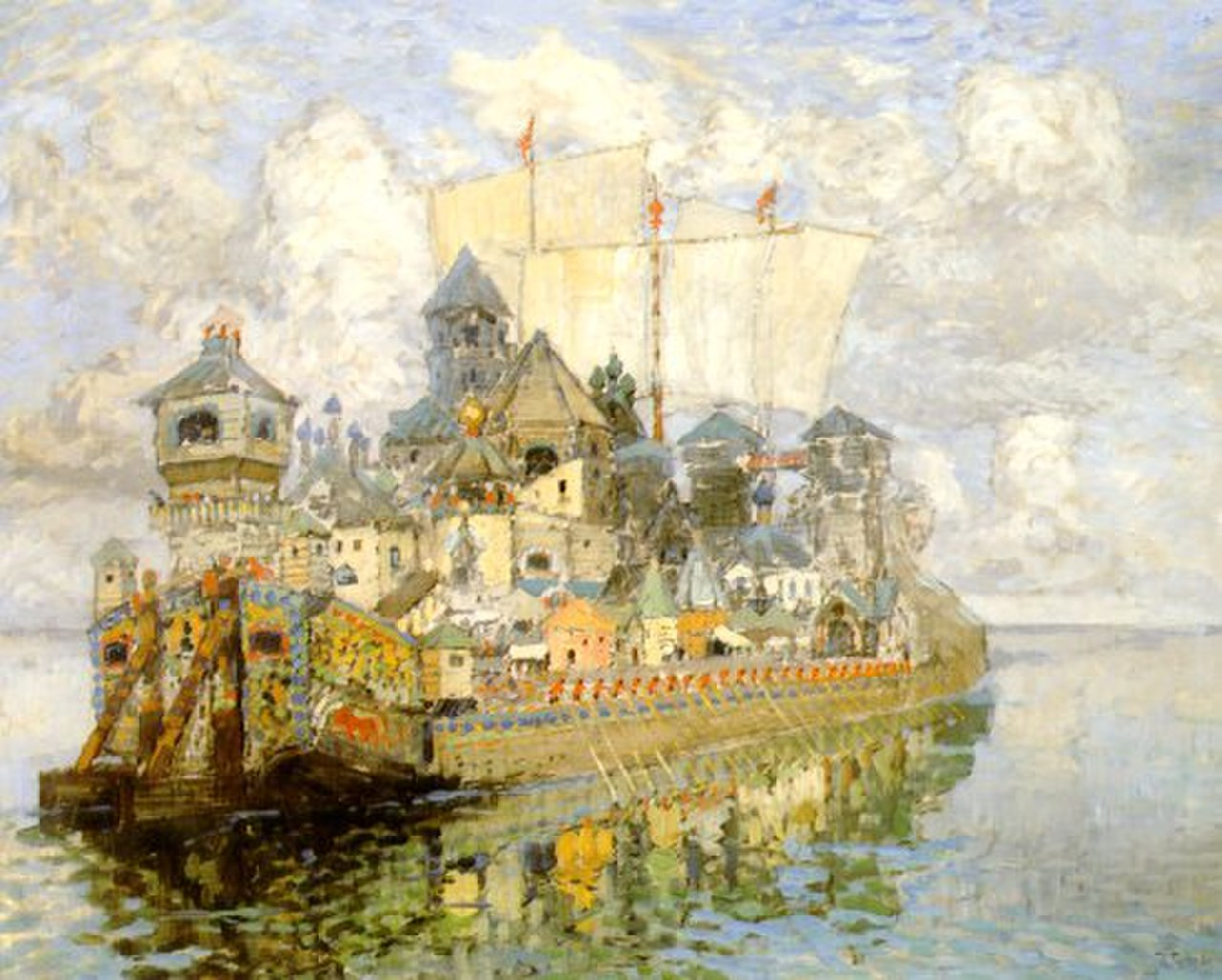
Kitezh, 1913.

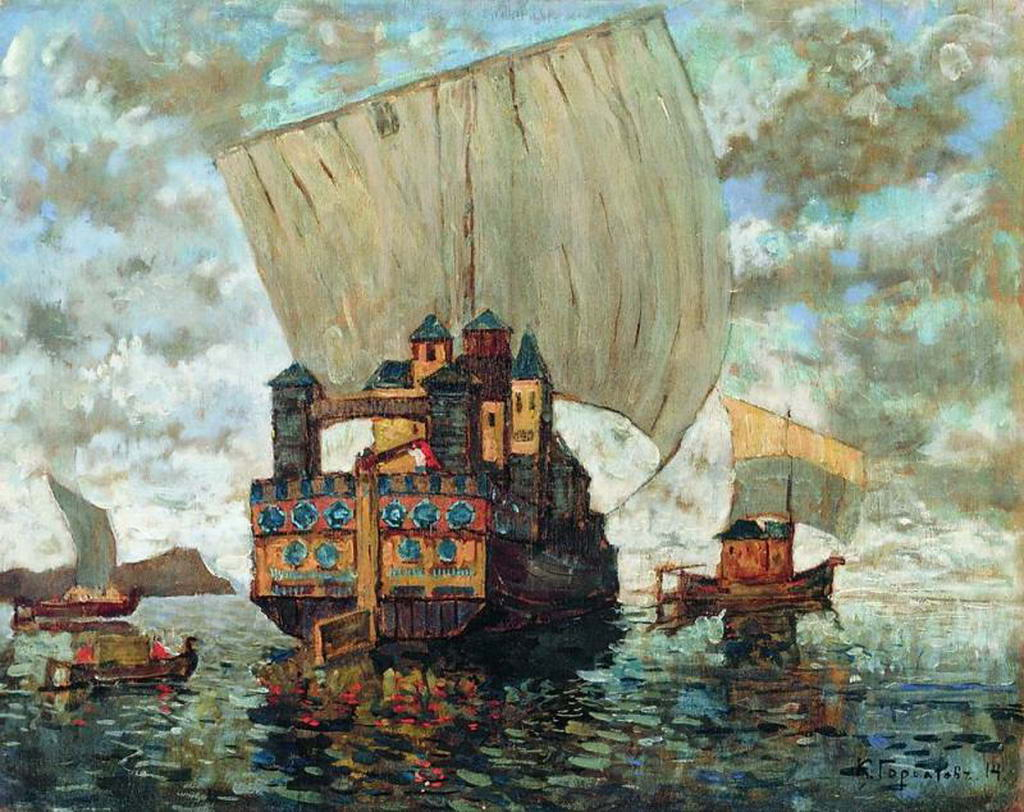
Belyany, 1914.

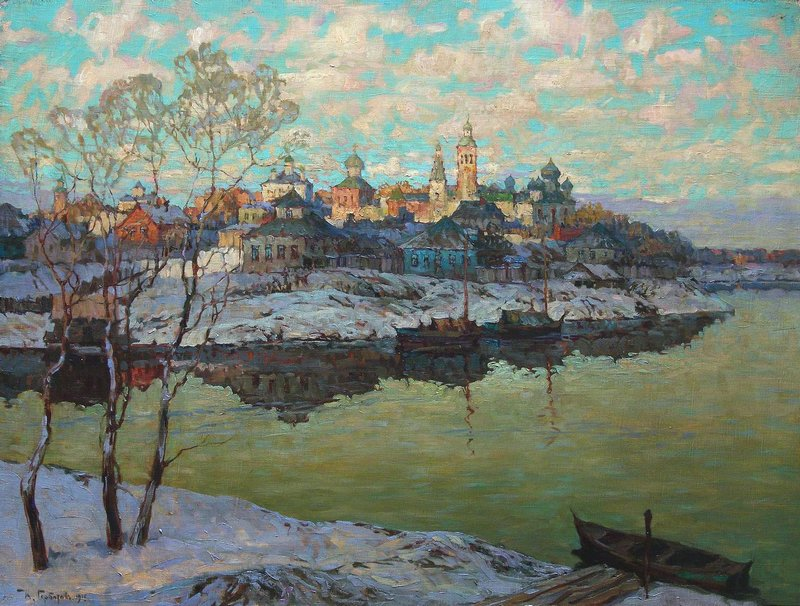
Early Spring, 1914–15.

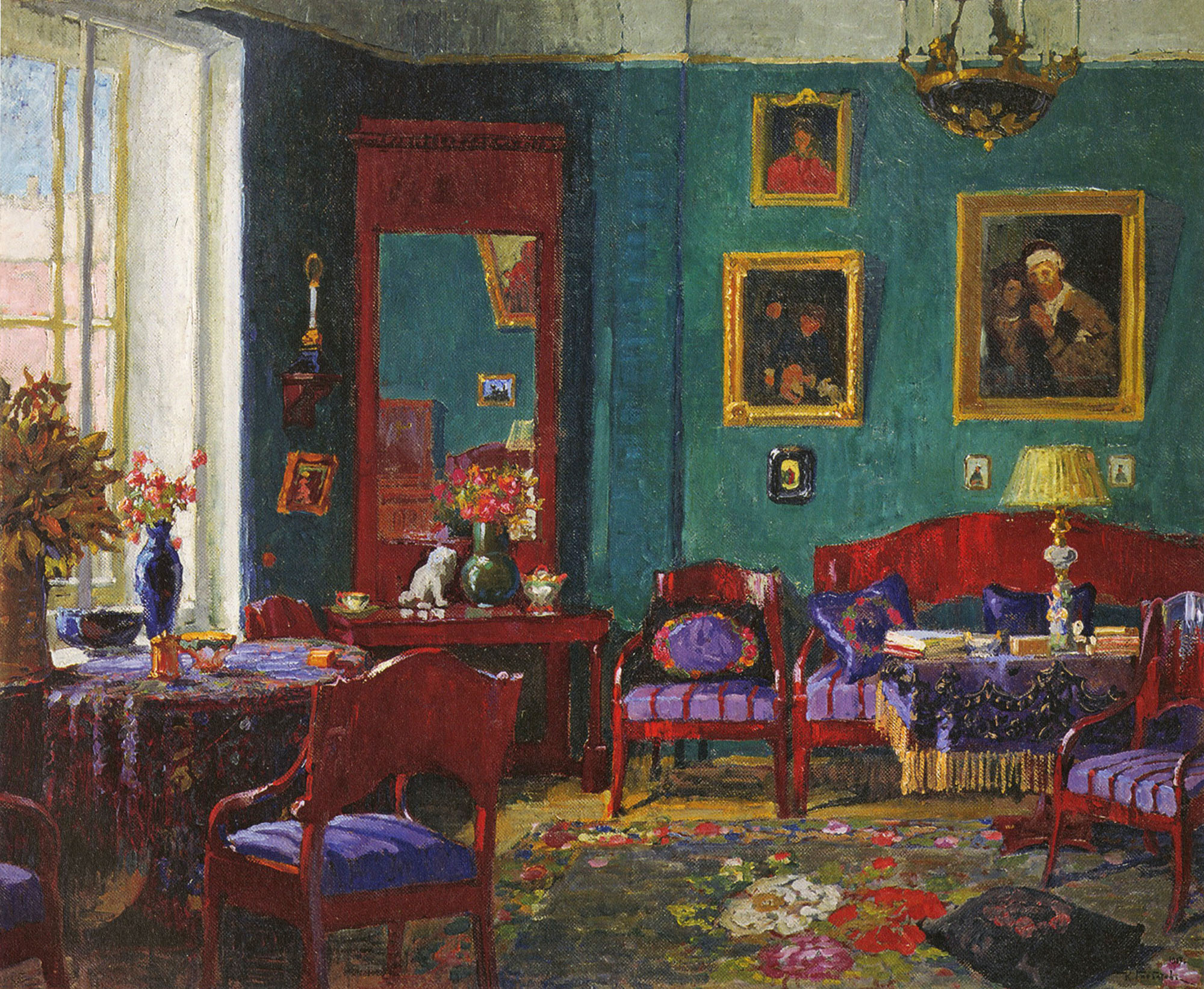
Interior, 1917.

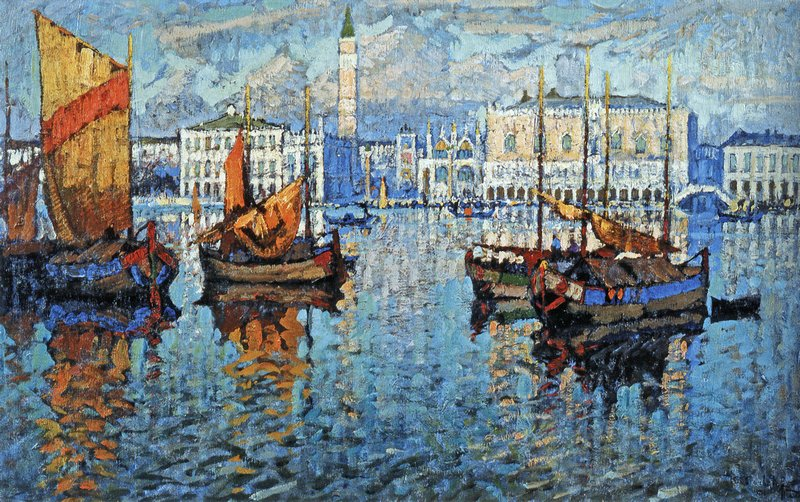
Venice, 1931.

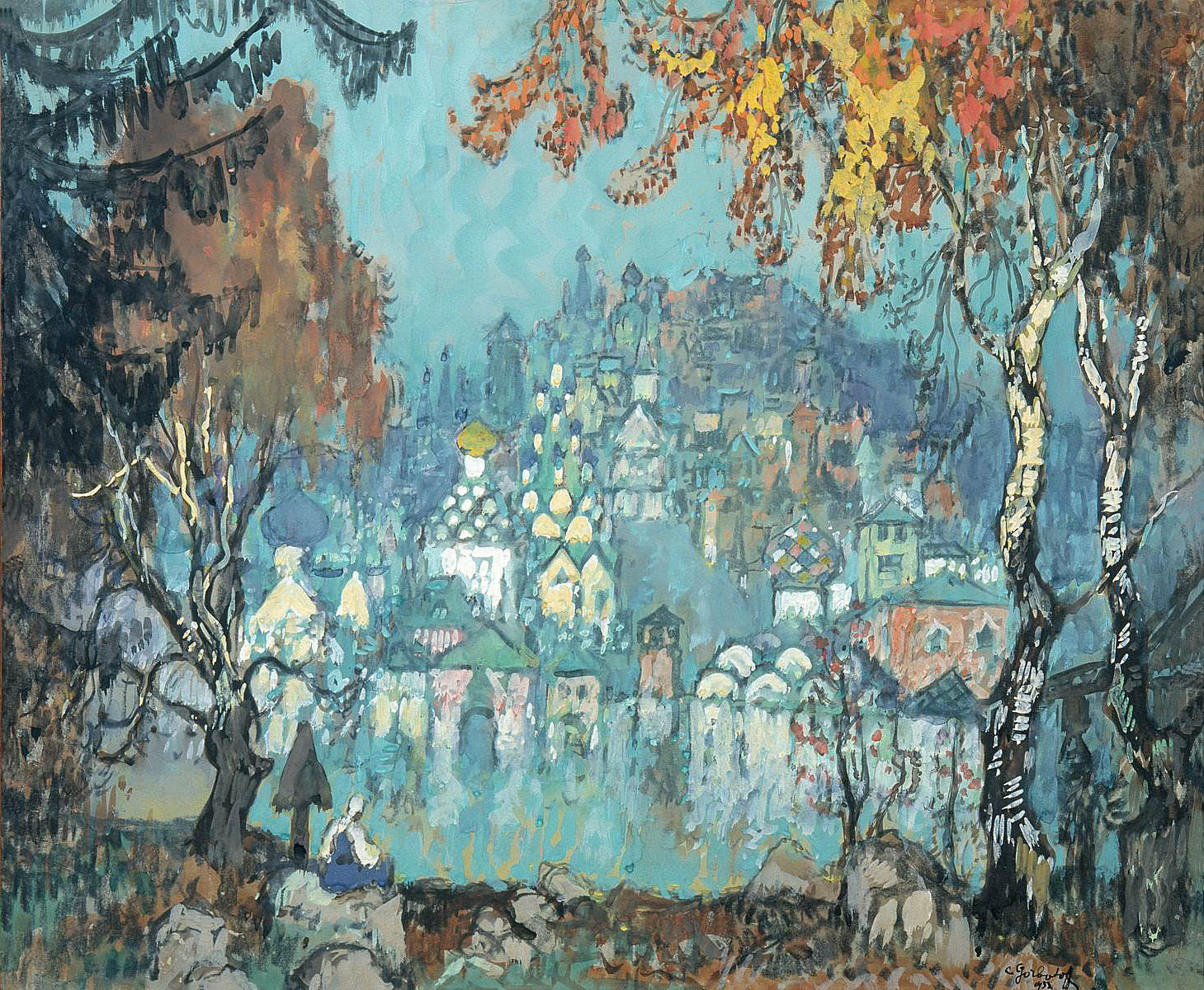
The Drowned City, 1933

== Bequest ==
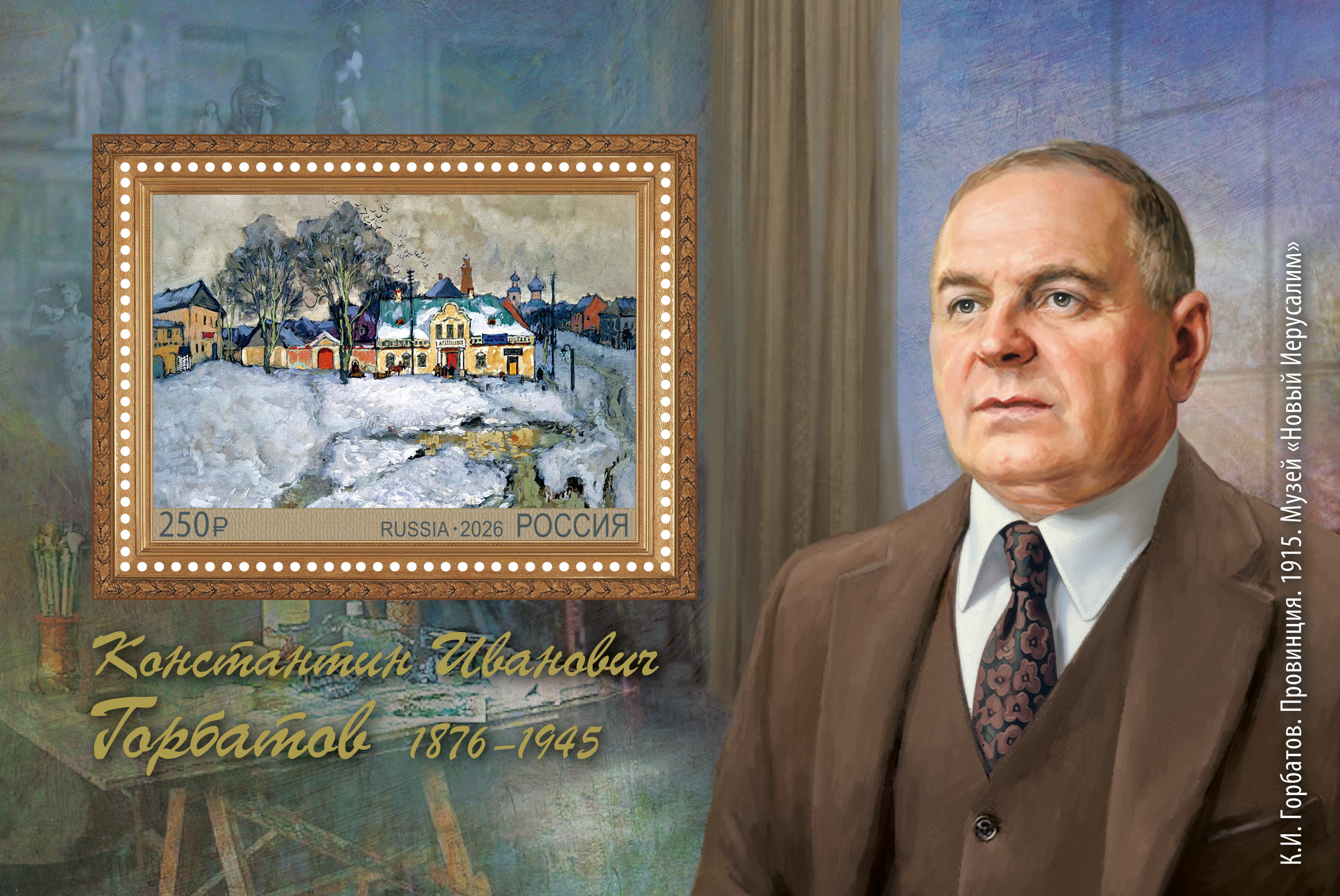
Gorbatov and his 1915 work Province on a 2026 stamp sheet of Russia

Gorbatov bequeathed his work to the Academy of Arts in Leningrad. The work was delivered to the Moscow Regional Museum of History and Arts near the New Jerusalem Monastery, where they have since been exhibited.

== Personal ==
Born in Stavropol, Russia, Gorbatov left the country permanently at age 46 in 1922, and settled in Berlin soon after. As a Russian émigré, he was forbidden to leave Germany during World War II. Gorbatov died shortly after the allied victory over Germany on 12 May 1945. His wife committed suicide on 17 June 1945.
