= List of shipwrecks in 1818 =

The list of shipwrecks in 1818 includes ships sunk, wrecked, or otherwise lost during 1818.

table of contents
1818
Jan	Feb	Mar	Apr
May	Jun	Jul	Aug
Sep	Oct	Nov	Dec
Unknown date

== January ==
=== 1 January ===
List of shipwrecks: 1 January 1818
Ship	State	Description
Cornwall	United Kingdom	The ship ran aground on the Blythe Sand, in the Thames Estuary off Sheerness, Kent. She was on a voyage from the Île de France to London. Cornwall was refloated on 6 January 1818 and proceeded to Gravesend, Kent.
Ilfracombe	United Kingdom	The ship foundered in the Atlantic Ocean off Tariffa, Spain. Her crew were rescued. She was on a voyage from London to Tarragona, Spain.

=== 2 January ===
List of shipwrecks: 2 January 1818
Ship	State	Description
Birtha Maria	Hamburg	The ship was driven ashore and wrecked near Zierikzee, North Holland, Netherlands. Her crew were rescued. She was on a voyage from Lisbon, Portugal to Hamburg.
Concord	United Kingdom	The ship ran aground and sank at Ilfracombe, Devon. She was on a voyage from Bristol, Gloucestershire to Bideford, Devon.
Hoop en Verwachting	Netherlands	The ship was driven ashore in the Vlie and was abandoned. She was on a voyage from Amsterdam, North Holland to Havre de Grâce, Seine-Inférieure, France.
Hope	United Kingdom	The ship was wrecked at Tireragh, County Sligo. She was on a voyage from Glasgow, Renfrewshire to Sligo.
William	United Kingdom	The ship foundered in the Atlantic Ocean off Oporto, Portugal with the loss of all hands. She was on a voyage from Newfoundland, British North America to Oporto.

=== 3 January ===
List of shipwrecks: 3 January 1818
Ship	State	Description
Ceres	United Kingdom	The ship ran aground at Charleston, South Carolina, United States. She was on a voyage from Charleston to the Clyde.
Prince Regent	United Kingdom	The ship was driven ashore and wrecked at Muros, Spain.
William	United Kingdom	The ship ran aground on Staten Island, New York, United States. All on board were rescued. She was on a voyage from South Shields, County Durham to New York.

=== 4 January ===
List of shipwrecks: 4 January 1818
Ship	State	Description
Bernard	United Kingdom	The ship was driven ashore at Cork. She was on a voyage from Bristol, Gloucestershire to Jamaica. Bernard was later refloated.
Expedition	United Kingdom	The ship foundered in the North Sea off Aberdeen with the loss of all hands. She was on a voyage from Newcastle upon Tyne, Northumberland to Saint Lucia.
Hibernia	United Kingdom	The ship ran aground on the Blythe Sand, in the Thames Estuary off Sheerness, Kent. She was on a voyage from London to Waterford.
Industry	United Kingdom	The ship was driven ashore and wrecked 10 nautical miles (19 km) west of Beaver Harbour, Nova Scotia, British North America. She was on a voyage from Jamaica to Halifax, Nova Scotia.
Thomas	(United Kingdom of Great Britain and Ireland) British North America	The ship was wrecked at St. Peter's, Cape Breton. She was on a voyage from Jamaica to Arichat, Nova Scotia.

=== 5 January ===
List of shipwrecks: 5 January 1818
Ship	State	Description
Judith	United Kingdom	The ship was driven ashore near Bognor, Sussex. Her crew were rescued. She was on a voyage from London to Arundel, Sussex.
Unnamed	Flag unknown	The cutter was wrecked off the Isles of Scilly

=== 6 January ===
List of shipwrecks: 6 January 1818
Ship	State	Description
London Packet	United Kingdom	The ship was driven ashore at Formby, Lancashire. She was on a voyage from Liverpool, Lancashire, to Cádiz, Spain. London Packet was refloated on 5 February and taken in to Liverpool.
Margaret	United Kingdom	The ship was lost at the mouth of the River Shannon. Her crew were rescued. She was on a voyage from Liverpool to Limerick.
Martin	United Kingdom	The ship was wrecked on Eilean Shona, Inverness-shire. Her crew were rescued. She was on a voyage from Memel, Prussia to Liverpool.
Sally	United States	The ship was abandoned in the Atlantic Ocean. Her crew were subsequently rescued by Derwent ( United Kingdom). Sally was on a voyage from New York to Limerick.

=== 7 January ===
List of shipwrecks: 7 January 1818
Ship	State	Description
Barbadoes Packet	United Kingdom	The ship ran aground on the Brake Sand, in the North Sea off the coast of Kent. She was on a voyage from London to Barbados. She was refloated and taken in to The Downs.
Bridgewater	United Kingdom	The ship was wrecked at Kilrush, County Clare.
Brothers	United Kingdom	The ship was driven ashore at Berck-sur-Mer, Pas-de-Calais, France. She was on a voyage from Dublin to London.
Hopewell	United Kingdom	The ship collided with HMS Heron (Royal Navy) and was severely damaged. She was towed in to Plymouth, Devon the next day.
James	United Kingdom	The ship was driven ashore and wrecked in the Bay of Authie near Boulogne, Pas-de-Calais. She was on a voyage from Cephalonia, United States of the Ionian Islands to Leith, Lothian
Rose	United Kingdom	The ship was driven ashore at Cucq, Pas-de-Calais. She was on a voyage from Plymouth, Devon to London. Rose was later refloated and taken in to Boulogne.

=== 8 January ===
List of shipwrecks: 8 January 1818
Ship	State	Description
Dart	United Kingdom	The schooner was driven ashore and wrecked at Berck, Pas-de-Calais, France with the loss of all eight of her crew.
James	United Kingdom	The brig foundered in the English Channel 3 nautical miles (5.6 km) off Berck. Her crew were rescued. She was on a voyage from Cephalonia, Greece to Leith, Lothian.
Two unnamed vessels	United Kingdom	A whaler and a sloop were driven ashore at Berck. Their crews were rescued.

=== 9 January ===
List of shipwrecks: 9 January 1818
Ship	State	Description
Flora	United Kingdom	The ship was driven ashore at the Old Head of Kinsale, County Cork. She was on a voyage from Quebec City, Lower Canada, British North America, to London.
Francis	United Kingdom	The ship was driven ashore at Wexford. Her crew were rescued. She was on a voyage from Terceira, Azores to Liverpool, Lancashire.
Unnamed	United Kingdom	The brig collided with HMS Pictou (Royal Navy) off the Tuskar Rock and foundered with the loss of all hands.

=== 10 January ===
List of shipwrecks: 10 January 1818
Ship	State	Description
Diligence	United Kingdom	The ship sprung a leak and was beached at A Coruña, Spain. She was subsequently wrecked and her crew rescued. She was on a voyage from Great Yarmouth, Norfolk to Cádiz, Spain.
Jeune Palmyre	France	The ship was at the mouth of the Gironde River. She was on a voyage from Havana, Cuba to Bordeaux, Gironde.
Notre Dame de L'Assumption	France	The brig was driven ashore at the mouth of the Ebro.
Perseverance	United Kingdom	The ship was driven ashore at Belhelvie, Aberdeenshire with the loss of fifteen lives. She was on a voyage from Pictou, Nova Scotia, British North America, to Aberdeen. Perseverance was refloated on the next tide and taken in to Aberdeen.

=== 11 January ===
List of shipwrecks: 11 January 1818
Ship	State	Description
Zephyr	United Kingdom	The sloop capsized in the North Sea off Cromer, Norfolk. She was on a voyage from Boston, Lincolnshire to London. Four crew members were rescued by the fishing smack Fifeshire ( United Kingdom).

=== 12 January ===
List of shipwrecks: 12 January 1818
Ship	State	Description
Bristol Volunteer	United Kingdom	The ship was driven ashore in Ballinskerrigs Bay. She was on a voyage from Bristol, Gloucestershire to Antigua.
Caledonia	(United Kingdom of Great Britain and Ireland) British North America	The ship was driven ashore at the Old Head of Kinsale, County Cork, United Kingdom. She was on a voyage from Prince Edward Island to Cork.
Eliza	United States	The brig capsized in the Baltic Sea and was abandoned. She was bound for Lübeck.
Unity	United Kingdom	The ship was driven ashore at Roslie Point, County Mayo. She was on a voyage from Westport, County Mayo to the Clyde.

=== 13 January ===
List of shipwrecks: 13 January 1818
Ship	State	Description
Aimwell	United Kingdom	The sloop was wrecked on the Goodwin Sands, Kent. Her crew were rescued. She was on a voyage from "Saloe" to London.
Argo	United Kingdom	The ship was wrecked on the Kentish Knock, in the North Sea off Margate, Kent. Her crew were rescued. She was on a voyage from Great Yarmouth, Norfolk to Naples, Kingdom of the Two Sicilies.
Hercules	United Kingdom	The ship departed from Saint Domingue for London. No further trace, presumed foundered with the loss of all hands.
Hope	United Kingdom	The ship was driven ashore on the Isle of Arran. She was on a voyage from Richmond, Virginia, United States to the Clyde. Hope was later refloated and continued her voyage.
Sunnyside	United Kingdom	The brig was wrecked on the Gunfleet Sand, in the North Sea off the coast of Essex. Her crew were rescued. She was on a voyage from South Shields, County Durham to London.
Vittoria	United Kingdom	The brig was wrecked on the Kentish Knock. Her crew were rescued by the lugger King George ( United Kingdom). Vittoria was on a voyage from Newcastle upon Tyne, Northumberland to Plymouth, Devon.
Unnamed	United Kingdom	The sloop foundered north of Sunderland, County Durham with the loss of all hands.

=== 14 January ===
List of shipwrecks: 14 January 1818
Ship	State	Description
Zwey Freunden	Prussia	The ship was driven ashore near Stavanger, Norway. She was on a voyage from Swinemünde to Bordeaux, Gironde, France.
Vittoria	United Kingdom	The brig was wrecked on the Kentish Knock, in the North Sea off Margate, Kent. Her crew were rescued.

=== 15 January ===
List of shipwrecks: 15 January 1818
Ship	State	Description
Aurora	United Kingdom	The ship was driven onto the Borline Bank, in the Irish Sea off Campbeltown, Argyllshire. She was on a voyage from the Clyde to Cork.
George Little	United States	The ship was driven ashore at Hellevoetsluis, South Holland, Netherlands. She was on a voyage from Boston, Massachusetts, to Rotterdam, South Holland. George Little was refloated on 18 January and resumed her voyage.
Hercules	United Kingdom	The ship departed from St. Domingo for Liverpool, Lancashire. No further trace, presumed foundered with the loss of all hands.
Hibernia	United States	The schooner sprang a leak and was abandoned whilst on a voyage from Port-au-Prince, Haiti to Wilmington, North Carolina. Her crew survived.
Lady Hill	United Kingdom	The ship was driven ashore near Troon, Ayrshire. She was on a voyage from Drogheda, County Louth to Troon.
Lilie	United Kingdom	The sloop was driven ashore at Balcomie, Fife. Her crew were rescued. She was on a voyage from Cardiff, Glamorgan to Cramond, Lothian.
Lord McDonald	United Kingdom	The ship was lost off Stornoway, Isle of Lewis, Outer Hebrides. Her crew were rescued. She was on a voyage from Liverpool, Lancashire, to Stornoway.
Margaret	United Kingdom	The ship was driven ashore at Ardmore, Barra, Outer Hebrides. She was on a voyage from Greenock, Renfrewshire to Nassau, New Providence, Bahamas. She was refloated on 20 January.
Protector	United Kingdom	The ship was driven ashore at Greenock. She was on a voyage from Saint John, New Brunswick, British North America, to Greenock.

=== 16 January ===
List of shipwrecks: 16 January 1818
Ship	State	Description
John	United Kingdom	The ship was last sighted on this day whilst on a voyage from London to Virginia, United States. No further trace, presumed foundered with the loss of all hands.
Phœnix	Sweden	The ship was driven ashore on the coast of Jutland. She was on a voyage from Gothenburg to "Helmstadt".
Providentia	Sweden	The ship was driven ashore at "Okero". She was on a voyage from St. Ubes, Portugal to Stockholm. Providentia was refloated on 27 January and taken in to Gothenburg, Sweden.
Wellington	United Kingdom	The ship ran aground on the Nayland Rock, in the North Sea off Margate, Kent. She was on a voyage from Rouen, Seine-Inférieure, France to London. Wellington was refloated and taken in to Margate.

=== 17 January ===
List of shipwrecks: 17 January 1818
Ship	State	Description
Concordia	Russia	The ship departed from Copenhagen, Denmark for Lisbon, Portugal. No further trace, presumed foundered with the loss of all hands.
Sutton	United Kingdom	The ship was driven ashore at Lytham St. Annes, Lancashire. She was on a voyage from Newry, County Antrim to Liverpool, Lancashire.

=== 18 January ===
List of shipwrecks: 18 January 1818
Ship	State	Description
Liefde	Russia	The ship was abandoned whilst on a voyage from Texel, North Holland, Netherlands to Brest, Finistère, France.
Speedwell	United Kingdom	The ship was driven ashore at Ostend, West Flanders, Netherlands.
Tyne	United Kingdom	The ship was driven ashore at Zierikzee, North Holland, Netherlands. She was on a voyage from Harwich, Essex to Rotterdam, South Holland, Netherlands.

=== 20 January ===
List of shipwrecks: 20 January 1818
Ship	State	Description
Nelly	United Kingdom	The ship was wrecked on the Martin's Industry Shoal, in the Atlantic Ocean off the coast of the United States. Her crew were rescued. She was on a voyage from Liverpool, Lancashire, to Savannah, Georgia.

=== 21 January ===
List of shipwrecks: 21 January 1818
Ship	State	Description
Endeavour	United Kingdom	The ship departed from Ipswich, Suffolk for Leith, Lothian. No further trace, presumed foundered in the North Sea with the loss of all hands.
Maria Rose	United Kingdom	The ship was driven ashore and wrecked at Southwold, Suffolk.

=== 22 January ===
List of shipwrecks: 22 January 1818
Ship	State	Description
Ellen	United Kingdom	The ship was wrecked in Dingle Bay. Her crew were rescued. She was on a voyage from New Orleans, Louisiana, to Liverpool, Lancashire.
Isabella	United Kingdom	The ship was driven ashore at Workington, Cumberland. She was on a voyage from Sligo to Liverpool.
Thomas Gelston	United Kingdom	The ship ran ashore at Cork. She was on a voyage from New Brunswick, British North America to Liverpool. She was refloated and taken in to Cork.

=== 23 January ===
List of shipwrecks: 23 January 1818
Ship	State	Description
Ann	United Kingdom	The ship was wrecked at "Thester", Jutland. She was on a voyage from Boston, Lincolnshire to Banff, Aberdeenshire.
Hugh	United Kingdom	The ship was severely damaged by fire at Belfast, County Antrim.

=== 24 January ===
List of shipwrecks: 24 January 1818
Ship	State	Description
Betsey	United Kingdom	The ship sprang a leak and was abandoned in the North Sea off Cromer, Norfolk. She was on a voyage from Chatham, Kent to Thorn.
Maria	Norway	The ship was wrecked in the Hebrides.
St. Michael	United Kingdom	The ship was driven ashore at Llanelli, Glamorgan. She was on a voyage from Ballydonaghan, County Clare to Llanelli.

=== 27 January ===
List of shipwrecks: 27 January 1818
Ship	State	Description
Jane Gordon	United Kingdom	The ship was driven ashore in Caernarvon Bay. She was on a voyage from Maranhão, Brazil to Liverpool, Lancashire. Jane Gordon was refloated on 5 February and taken in to Caernarfon.

=== 28 January ===
List of shipwrecks: 28 January 1818
Ship	State	Description
Union	United Kingdom	The ship was driven onto the Foreness Rock, near Margate, Kent. She was on a voyage from Cork to London. She was refloated on 30 January and taken in to Margate.

=== 29 January ===
List of shipwrecks: 29 January 1818
Ship	State	Description
British Tar	United Kingdom	The ship was driven ashore and wrecked between Christchurch, Dorset and Lymington, Hampshire with the loss of all on board, at least fourteen people. She was on a voyage from Sierra Leone to London.
General Hamilton	United States	The ship was driven ashore near the Warden Ledge, Isle of Wight, United Kingdom. She was on a voyage from Havre de Grâce, Seine-Inférieure, France to New York. General Hamilton was refloated on 2 February and taken in to Cowes, Isle of Wight.
La Plata	Portugal	The ship was driven ashore at Bristol, Gloucestershire, United Kingdom. She was on a voyage from Bristol to Liverpool, Lancashire, United Kingdom.

=== 30 January ===
List of shipwrecks: 30 January 1818
Ship	State	Description
Ann	United Kingdom	The ship was driven ashore and damaged at Cabrita Point, Spain. Her crew were rescued. She was on a voyage from Newfoundland, British North America to Gibraltar. Ann was refloated on 5 February.
Demerary Packet	United Kingdom	The ship ran aground on the Leigh Spit, in the Thames Estuary off the coast of Essex. She was on a voyate from Demerara to London. She was refloated and resumed her voyage.
Jane	United Kingdom	The galiot capsized in the North Sea 20 leagues (60 nautical miles (110 km)) off Lowestoft, Suffolk.
John McCammon	United Kingdom	The ship was wrecked on the east coast of the United States. Her crew were rescued. She was on a voyage from Belfast, County Antrim to New York.

=== 31 January ===
List of shipwrecks: 31 January 1818
Ship	State	Description
Glory	United Kingdom	The ship foundered in the Irish Sea off St David's Head, Pembrokeshire. Her crew were rescued. She was on a voyage from Liverpool, Lancashire, to Havre de Grâce, Seine-Inférieure, France.
Hope	United States	The ship was driven ashore at Yarmouth, Massachusetts. She was on a voyage from Amsterdam, North Holland, Netherlands to Boston, Massachusetts.
Hope	United Kingdom	The brig was run down and sunk off Cromer, Norfolk by Alert ( United Kingdom). Her crew were rescued. Hope was on a voyage from Sunderland, County Durham to Le Tréport, Seine-Inférieure, France.
Isabella	United Kingdom	The ship was driven ashore near Whitby, Yorkshire. She was refloated and resumed her voyage.
Nancy	United Kingdom	The ship ran aground on the Foreness Rock, Margate, Kent. She was on a voyage from Moss, Norway to Arundel, Sussex. She was refloated and taken in to Margate.
True Blue	United Kingdom	The ship flat was wrecked on the West Hoyle Sandbank, in Liverpool Bay with the loss of three of the four people on board. She was on a voyage from Liverpool to Heligoland.
William	United Kingdom	The ship was driven ashore at Bideford, Devon. She was on a voyage from Milford Haven, Pembrokeshire to Swansea, Glamorgan.
Unnamed	United Kingdom	The brig foundered off Happisburgh, Norfolk with the loss of her captain. Two survivors were rescued by the brig Mary ( United Kingdom).

=== Unknown date ===
List of shipwrecks: Unknown date in January 1818
Ship	State	Description
Active	United Kingdom	The ship was driven ashore between Maryport and Workington, Cumberland.
Adventure	United Kingdom	The ship capsized in the Atlantic Ocean. She was on a voyage from Saint John, New Brunswick, to Barbados. Six of her nine crew survived to be rescued on 28 January by Ann ( United Kingdom).
Arethusa	United Kingdom	The ship foundered off Lemnos, Greece.
Brilliant	United States	The ship was lost at the mouth of the Weser. Her crew were rescued. She was on a voyage from Philadelphia, Pennsylvania, to Bremen.
Charlotte	United Kingdom	The ship was abandoned in the North Sea. She was subsequently discovered a wreck and taken in to Bergen, Norway, where she arrived on 24 January.
Eunice	United Kingdom	The ship was driven ashore between Maryport and Workington.
Friendship	United Kingdom	The ship was driven ashore between Maryport and Workington.
Gustaf Adolph	Sweden	The ship was driven ashore and wrecked at Great Yarmouth, Norfolk, United Kingdom. She was on a voyage from Stockholm to London, United Kingdom.
Isabella	United Kingdom	The ship was sighted off Gibraltar whilst on a voyage from St. John's, Newfoundland, British North America, to Genoa, Kingdom of Sardinia. No further trace, presumed foundered in the Mediterranean Sea with the loss of all hands.
Isabella	(United Kingdom of Great Britain and Ireland) Grenada	The drogher was wrecked on a reef off Grenville in late January.
Jane	United Kingdom	The galiot capsized in the North Sea 20 leagues (60 nautical miles (110 km) off Lowestoft, Suffolk before 30 January.
Juliana	United Kingdom	The ship sank at Cuxhaven. She was on a voyage from Königsberg, Prussia to Hamburg.
Lewis	United States	The ship was driven ashore in the Gironde Estuary. She was on a voyage from New Orleans, Louisiana, to Bordeaux, Gironde.
Lindford	Hamburg	The ship was wrecked on Saaremaa, Russia. She was on a voyage from Hamburg to Helsingfors, Grand Duchy of Finland.
Malcolm	United States	The ship ran aground in the Vlie. She was on a voyage from New Orleans to Amsterdam, North Holland, Netherlands. She was refloated with the assistance of a number of fishing boats and taken in to the Nieuwe Diep.
Margaret	United Kingdom	The brig foundered in the Irish Sea with the loss of all hands. She was on a voyage from Liverpool, Lancashire, to Limerick.
Maria	Norway	The ship was wrecked on South Uist, Orkney Islands, United Kingdom in late January. She was on a voyage from Trondheim to Genoa, Kingdom of Sardinia.
Mary	United Kingdom	The ship was lost on the North Bank, in Liverpool Bay. She was on a voyage from Waterford to Liverpool.
Mary	United Kingdom	The ship departed from Liverpool for Trieste. No further trace, presumed foundered with the loss of all hands.
Ocean	United Kingdom	The ship was driven ashore near Gallipoli, Ottoman Empire. She was later refloated.
Protector	United Kingdom	The ship was driven ashore at Greenock, Renfrewshire in mid-January.
Rebecca	United Kingdom	The ship was driven ashore at L'Aiguillon-sur-Mer, Vendée, France. She was on a voyage from New Orleans to Bordeaux.
Relson Maria	Norway	The ship ran aground off "Torgersoen". She was on a voyage from Dramme to Amsterdam, North Holland, Netherlands.
Sally	United Kingdom	The ship was abandoned in the North Sea. She was discovered by Cringle ( United Kingdom) and taken in to Wells-next-the-Sea, Norfolk in a sinking condition.
Saxe Coburg	United Kingdom	The brigantine's crew mutinied, killing all but two of her officers whilst the ship was loading in India. They plundered and burnt her.
Sir John Moore	United Kingdom	The sloop was wrecked on Tiree, Inner Hebrides with the loss of all hands. She was on a voyage from Liverpool to Sligo.
Sir Sidney Smith	United Kingdom	The ship struck a rock off Jersey, Channel Islands and was damaged.
Tennessee	United States	The ship was lost at Bremen before 19 January. She was on a voyage from Philadelphia, Pennsylvania, to Bremen.
Thomas	United Kingdom	The ship was lost on the Norwegian coast. She was on a voyage from Riga, Russia to London.
Thomas Wilson	United Kingdom	The ship was driven ashore at New York. She was on a voyage from Greenock, Renfrewshire to New York. Thomas Wilson was refloated on 18 January.
Ulysses	(United Kingdom of Great Britain and Ireland) Jamaica	The ship foundered while on a voyage from Jamaica to New Orleans, Louisiana.
Several unnamed vessels	Flags unknown	The ship were wrecked in the Morea, Greece.

== February ==
=== 1 February ===
List of shipwrecks: 1 February 1818
Ship	State	Description
Minerva	United Kingdom	The ship struck the Whitby Rock. She was on a voyage from Newcastle upon Tyne, Northumberland to Oporto, Portugal. She put in to Scarborough, Yorkshire in a leaky condition.
Moston	United States	The brig foundered in the Atlantic Ocean. She was on a voyage from New York to Demerara.
Syren	United Kingdom	The pilot boat was wrecked on the Trinity Sand, in the Humber.

=== 3 February ===
List of shipwrecks: 3 February 1818
Ship	State	Description
Confidence	United Kingdom	The ship was abandoned in Garrans Bay, Cornwall. She was on a voyage from Waterford to Jersey, Channel Islands. Confidence was taken in to Falmouth, Cornwall, the next day.
James Hamilton	United Kingdom	The ship was driven ashore in the Bay of Laggan, Islay. She was on a voyage from Saltcoats, Ayrshire to Dublin.
William	United Kingdom	The ship was driven ashore on Staten Island, New York, United States. All on board were rescued. She was on a voyage from Hull, Yorkshire to New York City. William was refloated in late April and taken in to New York City.

=== 4 February ===
List of shipwrecks: 4 February 1818
Ship	State	Description
Clifton	United Kingdom	The sloop was wrecked on Little Curaçao Island. All on board were rescued by the schooner Colonist ( (United Kingdom of the Netherlands) Curaçao). She was on a voyage from Curaçao to Puerto Cabello, Venezuela.
Diamond	United Kingdom	The sloop was driven ashore near Brodick Castle, Isle of Arran.
Favourite Packet	United Kingdom	The ship was wrecked near Calais, France. All on board were rescued. She was on a voyage from Dover, Kent to Calais.
Fly	United Kingdom	The ship was driven ashore near Dartmouth, Devon. She was on a voyage from London to Cádiz, Spain. Fly was subsequently wrecked.
Godfrey	United Kingdom	The sloop was driven ashore near Brodick Castle.
Isabella	United Kingdom	The sloop was driven ashore near Brodick Castle.
The Favourite	United Kingdom	The packet boat ran aground off Sangatte, Pas-de-Calais, France. All on board were rescued. She was on a voyage from Dover, Kent to Calais.

=== 5 February ===
List of shipwrecks: 5 February 1818
Ship	State	Description
Diamond	United Kingdom	The sloop was driven ashore at Brodick Castle, Isle of Arran.
Godfrey	United Kingdom	The sloop was driven ashore at Brodick Castle.
Isabella	United Kingdom	The sloop was driven ashore at Brodick Castle.
Princess of Wales	United Kingdom	The ship was wrecked on Seguin's Ledge with the loss of seven of her crew. She was on a voyage from Jamaica to Bath, Maine, United States.
York Packet	United Kingdom	The ship was driven ashore near Brielle, South Holland, Netherlands. She was on a voyage from Hull, Yorkshire to Rotterdam, South Holland. York Packet was refloated on 7 February and resumed her voyage.

=== 6 February ===
List of shipwrecks: 6 February 1818
Ship	State	Description
Alpha	United States	The full-rigged ship was driven ashore at Lewistown, Pennsylvania. She was on a voyage from Belfast, County Down, United Kingdom to Philadelphia, Pennsylvania.
General Scott	United Kingdom	The brig was driven ashore on the coast of Pennsylvania. She was on a voyage from Port-au-Prince, Haiti to Philadelphia.
Three Schwestern	Netherlands	The ship was driven ashore near Utlängan, Sweden. She was on a voyage from Riga, Russia to Dordrecht, South Holland.

=== 7 February ===
List of shipwrecks: 7 February 1818
Ship	State	Description
Dove	United Kingdom	The ship sprang a leak and was beached near Osmington Mills, Dorset. She was on a voyage from Sunderland, County Durham to Weymouth, Dorset. Dove was refloated the next day and taken in to Weymouth.
Hope	United Kingdom	The brig was run down and sunk in the North Sea off Cromer, Norfolk by Alert ( United Kingdom). Her crew were rescued. She was on a voyage from Sunderland, County Durham to Le Tréport, Seine-Inférieure, France.

=== 8 February ===
List of shipwrecks: 8 February 1818
Ship	State	Description
Lonsdale	United Kingdom	The ship sprang a leak and foundered in the Irish Sea off Loop Head, County Clare. Her crew were rescued by Margaret ( United Kingdom). Lonsdale was on a voyage from Limerick to Greenock, Renfrewshire.

=== 9 February ===
List of shipwrecks: 9 February 1818
Ship	State	Description
Maria	United Kingdom	The ship sank in the Amazon River. She was on a voyage from Gibraltar to Pará, United Kingdom of Portugal, Brazil and the Algarves.

=== 10 February ===
List of shipwrecks: 10 February 1818
Ship	State	Description
Rose	United Kingdom	The ship was wrecked on the Tuskar Rock. Her crew were rescued. She was on a voyage from Messina, Kingdom of the Two Sicilies to Liverpool, Lancashire.

=== 11 February ===
List of shipwrecks: 11 February 1818
Ship	State	Description
Africa	United Kingdom	The ship was driven ashore on Texel, North Holland, Netherlands. She was on a voyage from Amsterdam, North Hollan to Leith, Lothian. She was refloated.
Young Marsh	(United Kingdom of Great Britain and Ireland) Jamaica	The sloop was wrecked on Healshire Point, Jamaica. She was on a voyage from Alligator Pond to Kingston, Jamaica

=== 12 February ===
List of shipwrecks: 12 February 1818
Ship	State	Description
Voluntario	Portugal	The schooner ran aground at St. Ubes. She was on a voyage from St. Ubes to Cork, United Kingdom.

=== 13 February ===
List of shipwrecks: 13 February 1818
Ship	State	Description
Orion	United Kingdom	The ship was wrecked on the Goodwin Sands, Kent. Her crew were rescued. She was on a voyage from Rotterdam, South Holland, Netherlands to Dublin.

=== 14 February ===
List of shipwrecks: 14 February 1818
Ship	State	Description
Jean	France	The brig capsized off The Lizard, Cornwall, United Kingdom. She was taken in to Falmouth, Cornwall by HMRC Hind ( Board of Customs). It was discovered that holes had been bored in her bottom.

=== 15 February ===
List of shipwrecks: 15 February 1818
Ship	State	Description
Sarah	United Kingdom	The ship was wrecked on the Arklow Banks, in the Irish Sea off the coast of County Wicklow. Her crew were rescued. She was on a voyage from Liverpool, Lancashire to Boston, Massachusetts, United States.

=== 16 February ===
List of shipwrecks: 16 February 1818
Ship	State	Description
Prince George	United Kingdom	The ship, which had sprung a leak on 2 February, was beached at Edgartown, Massachusetts, United States. She was on a voyage from London to New York, United States.

=== 17 February ===
List of shipwrecks: 17 February 1818
Ship	State	Description
Amelia	United Kingdom	The ship ran aground on Patrick's Bridge, off the Saltee Islands, County Wexford. She was on a voyage from New Orleans, Louisiana, United States to Liverpool, Lancashire. She was refloated and towed in to Waterford.

=== 18 February ===
List of shipwrecks: 18 February 1818
Ship	State	Description
Jane	United Kingdom	As the ship was returning to Greenock from Bengal, she encountered a severe gale between the Azores and the Newfoundland Banks. She was towed into Cork on 20 March, the storm having dismasted her and almost turned her into a complete wreck.

=== 20 February ===
List of shipwrecks: 20 February 1818
Ship	State	Description
Ocean	United States	The ship was driven ashore at Scawell's Point, Virginia.
San Nicolo	Flag unknown	The ship was at Missolonghi, Morea Eyalet bound for Amsterdam, North Holland, Netherlands. No further trace, presumed foundered with the loss of all hands.
William	United Kingdom	The sloop was wrecked at Carnsore Point, County Wexford with the loss of all hands. She was on a voyage from Youghall, County Cork to Wexford.

=== 21 February ===
List of shipwrecks: 21 February 1818
Ship	State	Description
Harriet	United Kingdom	The ship was destroyed by fire at St. Mary's, Jamaica.
Johannes	Hamburg	The ship was wrecked on the Kentish Knock. Her crew were rescued. She was on a voyage from Hamburg to Lisbon, Portugal.
Margaret	(United Kingdom of Great Britain and Ireland) British North America	The ship was wrecked at Prospect, Nova Scotia, with the loss of all but one of her crew. She was on a voyage from Jamaica to Saint John, New Brunswick.
Relief	United Kingdom	The ship was driven ashore at Portsmouth, Hampshire. She was refloated.

=== 22 February ===
List of shipwrecks: 22 February 1818
Ship	State	Description
Carrier	United Kingdom	The ship was driven ashore in Loch Indaal. She was on a voyage from Belfast, County Antrim to Westport, County Mayo. Carrier was refloated by 11 March.
George	United Kingdom	The ship foundered in the Irish Sea off Wexford. Her crew were rescued. She was on a voyage from Liverpool, Lancashire, to Waterford.
Goodwill	United Kingdom	The ship was driven ashore at Newhaven, Sussex. Her crew were rescued. She was on a voyage from Newhaven to Falmouth, Cornwall. Goodwill was refloated and taken back to Newhaven but struck the pier and damaged her bows
Minerva	United Kingdom	The ship was driven ashore at Southport, Lancashire. She was on a voyage from Limerick to Liverpool.
Voluntario	Portugal	The ship was wrecked near Gijón with the loss of five of her crew. She was on a voyage from St. Ubes to Cork, United Kingdom.

=== 23 February ===
List of shipwrecks: 23 February 1818
Ship	State	Description
Christie	United Kingdom	The sloop capsized off Rhum, Inner Hebrides with the loss of all hands.
Eliza	United Kingdom	The ship ran aground on the Middle Sand, in the North Sea off the coast of Essex, and was abandoned by her crew. She was on a voyage from South Shields, County Durham to London. Eliza was later refloated with the assistance of three smacks and taken in to Harwich, Essex.
Emerald	United Kingdom	The whaler was driven ashore at Northfleet, Kent. She was on a voyage from the South Seas to London. She was refloated the next day.
Lady Banks	United Kingdom	The ship was driven ashore in the River Thames downstream of Gravesend, Kent. She was on a voyage from London to Madras, India. She was refloated and taken in to Northfleet.
Prospere	France	The ship was driven ashore at Padstow, Cornwall, United Kingdom. She was on a voyage from Newport, Monmouthshire, United Kingdom to Rouen, Seine-Inférieure.
Rambler	United Kingdom	The lugger was run down and sunk by a sloop in the North Sea off Pakefield, Suffolk. Her crew were rescued. She was on a voyage from Great Yarmouth, Norfolk to London.
Sarah	United Kingdom	The ship capsized and sank in the Thames Estuary with the loss of one of the three people on board. Survivors were rescued by a fishing boat. She was on a voyage from Aldeburgh, Suffolk to London.
Sherbrooke	United Kingdom	The ship was driven ashore and wrecked on Barra, Outer Hebrides with the loss of three of her crew. She was on a voyage from Sligo to Glasgow, Renfrewshire.
Tibbut	United Kingdom	The ship was driven ashore and wrecked at Shoreham-by-Sea, Sussex. Her crew were rescued. She was on a voyage from London to Bilbao, Spain.

=== 24 February ===
List of shipwrecks: 24 February 1818
Ship	State	Description
Albion	United Kingdom	The ship was driven ashore and damaged at Padstow, Cornwall.
Ann	United Kingdom	The ship was driven ashore and damaged at Padstow.
Bellam	United Kingdom	The ship was driven ashore at Padstow.
Cervantes	United Kingdom	The ship was driven ashore in Loch Indaal. she was on a voyage from Greenock, Renfrewshire to Jamaica. Cervantes had been refloated by 23 March and put back to the Clyde for repairs.
Eleanor	United Kingdom	The ship was driven ashore at Padstow.
Eliza and Jane	United Kingdom	The ship was driven ashore and wrecked at Padstow. She was on a voyage from Waterford to London.
Emanuel	United Kingdom	The ship was driven ashore and wrecked at Padstow.
Gemini	United Kingdom	The ship was driven ashore on Islay, Inner Hebrides. She was on a voyage from Liverpool, Lancashire, to Sligo. Gemini was refloated in mid-March and taken in to Bowmore, Islay.
Goodintent	United Kingdom	The ship was driven ashore and damaged at Padstow.
Lord Howe	United Kingdom	The ship was driven ashore and damaged at Padstow.
Luck	United Kingdom	The ship was driven ashore at Padstow.
Mary Ann	United Kingdom	The sloop was driven ashore and wrecked at Padstow. She was on a voyage from Waterford to Portsmouth, Hampshire.
Neptune	United Kingdom	The ship was driven ashore at Sandy Hook, New Jersey, United States. She was on a voyage from Jamaica to New York, United States. Neptune was later refloated and arrived at New York on 2 March.
Supply	United Kingdom	The brig was wrecked at Padstow with the loss of all but one of her crew. She was on a voyage from Waterford to London.
Tamer	United Kingdom	The ship was driven ashore at Padstow.
Valency	United Kingdom	The ship was driven ashore and damaged at Padstow.
Venus	United Kingdom	The ship was driven ashore and damaged at Padstow.
Villiam	United Kingdom	The ship was driven ashore at Padstow.
Wellington	United Kingdom	The ship was driven ashore at Padstow.

=== 25 February ===
List of shipwrecks: 25 February 1818
Ship	State	Description
America	United States	The ship was driven ashore in the Nieuw Diep, North Holland, Netherlands.
Hartley	United Kingdom	The ship ran aground on the Brake Sand, in the North Sea off the coast of Kent. She was on a voyage from Sunderland, County Durham to Portsmouth, Hampshire. She was refloated and taken in to Ramsgate, Kent in a severely leaky condition.
Hoogen	United Kingdom	The ship was driven ashore in the Nieuw Diep.
Marmion	Netherlands	The ship was driven ashore in the Nieuw Diep.
Mercurius	Netherlands	The ship was driven ashore in the Nieuw Diep.
Mevagissey	United Kingdom	The ship was driven ashore and damaged at St. Michael's Island, Plymouth, Devon.

=== 26 February ===
List of shipwrecks: 26 February 1818
Ship	State	Description
Amitié	France	The ship was driven ashore and wrecked near Boulogne, Pas-de-Calais. Her crew were rescued. She was on a voyage from Ostend, West Flanders, Netherlands to Marennes, Charente-Inférierure.
Endeavour	United Kingdom	The ship was driven ashore and wrecked on St. Michael's Island, Plymouth, Devon.
Joseph	United States	The ship was wrecked on the Haaks Bank, in the North Sea off Texel, North Holland, Netherlands. She was on a voyage from Virginia to Amsterdam, North Holland.
Mary	United Kingdom	The ship ran aground on the East Mouse Sand. She was on a voyage from Youghall, County Cork to Liverpool, Lancashire. She was refloated and put in to Beaumaris, Anglesey in a sinking condition.
Mother & Sisters	United Kingdom	The ship was driven ashore in Loch Indaal. She was on a voyage from Greenock, Renfrewshire to Sligo.
Nepthunus	Netherlands	The ship was driven ashore on the "Tindwall".

=== 27 February ===
List of shipwrecks: 27 February 1818
Ship	State	Description
Frederick	France	The ship ran aground and sank at Barcelona, Spain. She was on a voyage from Marseille, Bouches-du-Rhône to Barcelona.

=== 28 February ===
List of shipwrecks: 28 February 1818
Ship	State	Description
Ancient Briton	United Kingdom	The ship sprang a leak and foundered in the Bristol Channel. Her crew were rescued. She was on a voyage from Newport, Monmouthshire to Minehead, Somerset.
Brothers	United Kingdom	The ship was driven ashore and wrecked at St. John's Point, County Down. She was on a voyage from Dublin to Glasgow, Renfrewshire.
Endeavour	United Kingdom	The ship was driven ashore near St. Peter's, Cape Breton Island, British North America. She was on a voyage from Jamaica to Halifax, Nova Scotia, British North America.
Good Intent	United Kingdom	The ship sprang a leak whilst on a voyage from Málaga, Spain to London. She put into Fowey, Cornwall, where she was beached.
Sarah	United Kingdom	The ship ran aground and was wrecked on the Mare Rocks, near Exmouth, Devon.

=== Unknown date ===
List of shipwrecks: Unknown date in February 1818
Ship	State	Description
Active	United States	The ship foundered in the Atlantic Ocean off Dingle, County Kerry. She was on a voyage from Philadelphia, Pennsylvania, to Limerick.
Albion	United Kingdom	The ship was driven ashore by ice on Coney Island, New York City, United States. She was on a voyage from Liverpool, Lancashire, to New York.
Brilliant	United Kingdom	The ship was lost in Dingle Bay. Her crew were rescued. She was on a voyage from Limerick to the Clyde.
Clarissa Ann	United States	The brig ran aground on the Florida Reef. She was on a voyage from New Orleans, Louisiana, to Gibraltar. Clarissa Ann was later refloated and arrived at Nassau, Bahamas on 4 February.
Drotning Christina	Sweden	The ship was driven ashore on Craney Island, Virginia, United States. She was refloated by 25 February.
HMS Eden	Royal Navy	The sixth rate was sunk at Hamoaze, Devon in early February in an effort to cure dry rot. She was subsequently refloated for repairs.
Good Hoop	Netherlands	The ship departed from Surinam for Amsterdam, North Holland in early February. No further trace, presumed foundered with the loss of all hands.
Jane and Alice	United Kingdom	The ship ran aground on the Lavan Sands. She was on a voyage from Liverpool to Antwerp, Netherlands. She was refloated and put in to Beaumaris, Anglesey.
Jason	United Kingdom	The ship sprang a leak and sank off South Shields, county Durham.
Jean	United Kingdom	The ship was driven ashore near Southport, Lancashire, in late February. She was on a voyage from Dublin to Liverpool. Jean was refloated on 27 February.
Jeanne	France	The brig was abandoned in the English Channel by her crew, who had bored several holes in her hull. She was subsequently discovered by HMRC Hind ( Board of Customs) and taken in to Falmouth, Cornwall, United Kingdom.
Johannes	Hamburg	The ship ran aground off Amrum, Duchy of Schleswig. she was on a voyage from Bordeaux, Gironde, France, to Hamburg.
Moses	United States	The ship was lost at "Ourtan" in late February. Her crew were rescued. She was on a voyage from New York to Bordeaux, Gironde, France.
Nanette	France	The ship was driven ashore on the coast of Catalonia, Spain, before 9 March. She was on a voyage from Marseille, Bouches-du-Rhône, to Aux Cayes, Haiti. Nanette was later refloated and placed under repair.
Paulina	United Kingdom	The ship was driven ashore and wrecked on Lemnos, Greece.
Proven	Denmark	The ship was lost off the coast of Jutland. She was on a voyage from Copenhagen to Africa.
Seaton	United Kingdom	The ship departed from Liverpool for Baltimore, Maryland, United States. No further trace, presumed foundered with the loss of all hands.
Shannon	United Kingdom	The brig ran aground on the Florida Reef. She was on a voyage from Port Antonia, Jamaica to London. Shannon was later refloated and arrived at Nassau, Bahamas on 21 February.
St Maria	Russia	The ship was driven ashore and wrecked near Haapsalu. She was on a voyage from Saint Petersburg to Riga.
Vertrouven	Netherlands	The ship was wrecked on the Holme Sand, in the North Sea.
William Brown	United Kingdom	The ship was presumed to have foundered in the North Sea off Texel, North Holland, Netherlands.

== March ==
=== 1 March ===
List of shipwrecks: 1 March 1818
Ship	State	Description
Blucher	United Kingdom	The ship was driven ashore and wrecked on the Île de France, Mauritius.
Ceres	United Kingdom	The ship was driven ashore near "Shermalee". She was on a voyage from Glasgow, Renfrewshire to Newry, County Antrim.
Ceres	United Kingdom	The ship was driven ashore and damaged on the Île de France.
HMS Magicienne	Royal Navy	The fifth-rate frigate sank at the Île de France during a hurricane. She was later refloated, repaired and returned to service.
Margaret	United States	The ship was wrecked on Little Heneaga. Her crew were rescued. She was on a voyage from Port-au-Prince, Haiti to New York
Melantho	France	The ship was driven ashore in a hurricane at the Île de France.
Neptune	United Kingdom	The ship was driven ashore crewless at Blakeney, Norfolk. She was refloated and taken to Cromer, where she had to be run ashore and was subsequently wrecked.
Paix	France	The ship was driven ashore and wrecked on the Île de France.

=== 2 March ===
List of shipwrecks: 2 March 1818
Ship	State	Description
Cornest or Gornest	United Kingdom	The ship was presumed to have foundered in Liverpool Bay off Southport, Lancashire.
Prince Regent	United Kingdom	The ship departed from Sunderland, County Durham for Woodbridge, Suffolk. No further trace, presumed foundered in the North Sea with the loss of all hands.
Wood Pecker	United Kingdom	The ship was wrecked on "Lypskjaren". Her crew were rescued. She was on a voyage from Newcastle upon Tyne, Northumberland to Helsingør, Denmark.
Whim	(United Kingdom of Great Britain and Ireland) Jamaica	The sloop was wrecked at Spring Garden Point.

=== 3 March ===
List of shipwrecks: 3 March 1818
Ship	State	Description
Flora	United Kingdom	The ship was driven ashore at South Shields, County Durham. She was later refloated but found to be severely damaged.
Glory	United Kingdom	The ship was driven ashore at Ramsgate, Kent. She was on a voyage from Aberdeen to Montserrat. She was later refloated and taken in to Ramsgate.
Gorlston	United Kingdom	The ship was severely damaged at South Shields.
Juno	United Kingdom	The brig ran aground on the Black Middens, in the North Sea off the mouth of the River Tyne. Her crew were rescued. Juno was later refloated and taken in to South Shields.
Laurel	United Kingdom	The ship was driven ashore at South Shields. She was later refloated but found to be severely damaged.
Mary Ann	United Kingdom	The brig was wrecked on the Black Middens. She subsequently came ashore at Tynemouth, Northumberland.
Ocean	United Kingdom	The ship was driven ashore at South Shields. She was later refloated but found to be severely damaged.
Peace	United Kingdom	The ship was wrecked on the Spanish Battery Rocks, off Tynemouth with the loss of her captain.
Robert and Frances	United Kingdom	The ship was driven ashore and wrecked at South Shields.
Two Sisters	United Kingdom	The ship was driven ashore and wrecked at South Shields.
Weazel	United Kingdom	The ship was driven ashore near Boston, Lincolnshire. Her crew were rescued.
William	United Kingdom	The ship was driven ashore at South Shields. She was later refloated but found to be severely damaged.
Several unnamed vessels	Flags unknown	Six or seven ships were driven ashore south of Sunderland, County Durham.

=== 4 March ===
List of shipwrecks: 4 March 1818
Ship	State	Description
Adonis	United Kingdom	The ship was severely damaged at Bridlington, Yorkshire.
Alpha	United Kingdom	The brig was driven ashore at Sunderland, County Durham. She was later refloated and taken in to Sunderland.
Amity	United Kingdom	The ship was wrecked on the Gunfleet Sand, in the North Sea off Harwich, Essex. She was on a voyage from Danzig to London.
Ann	United Kingdom	The schooner was driven ashore and wrecked at Penzance, Cornwall, with the loss of two of her crew.
Ant	United Kingdom	The ship was driven ashore at Southampton, Hampshire.
Argo	United Kingdom	The schooner was driven ashore and wrecked at Finnyfauld, Aberdeenshire with the loss of all five of her crew. She was on a voyage from Alnmouth, Northumberland to Aberdeen.
Argus	United Kingdom	The ship was driven ashore at Ramsgate, Kent, or on the Sandwich Flats. She was on a voyage from London to Saint Thomas, Virgin Islands Argus was refloated on 19 March and taken in to Ramsgate.
Asia	British East India Company	The East Indiaman was driven ashore at Ramsgate. She was on a voyage from Bombay, India to London. Asia was refloated on 19 March and taken in to Ramsgate.
Auckland	United Kingdom	The ship was driven ashore at Ramsgate. She was on a voyage from London to Cork. Auckland was refloated on 9 March and taken in to Ramsgate.
Betsey	United Kingdom	The ship was wrecked on the Mouse Sand, in the North Sea off Margate, Kent. She was on a voyage from Bengal, India to London.
Brilliant	United Kingdom	The ship was driven ashore in the Clyde. She was on a voyage from Liverpool, Lancashire, to Glasgow, Renfrewshire.
Caroline	United States	The ship was lost in the Abaco Islands. She was on a voyage from Norfolk, Virginia, to New Orleans, Louisiana.
Catherine	United Kingdom	The ship was driven ashore between Corton, Suffolk and Great Yarmouth, Norfolk. Her crew were rescued.
Ceres	United Kingdom	The sloop was driven ashore at Rye, Sussex with the loss of a crew member. She was on a voyage from Colchester, Essex to Rye.
Cornelia	United Kingdom	The ship was driven ashore and wrecked at Ramsgate with some loss of life.
Donegal	United Kingdom	The ship was driven ashore and severely damaged at Hubberstone Pill, Milford, Pembrokeshire. She was on a voyage from Belfast, County Down to London.
Duke of Wellington	United Kingdom	The ship was driven ashore at Southampton.
Eagle	United Kingdom	The ship was driven ashore and wrecked at Selsey, Sussex.
Earl Leicester	United Kingdom	The Post Office packet ship was driven ashore and damaged at Milford. She was later refloated.
Ebenezer	United Kingdom	The ship was driven ashore near Corton. Her crew were rescued. She was on a voyage from Newcastle upon Tyne, Northumberland to Lisbon, Portugal.
Elizabeth	United Kingdom	The ship was driven ashore at Ramsgate. She was on a voyage from Newcastle upon Tyne, Northumberland to Lisbon, Portugal. Elizabeth was subsequently condemned as beyond repair.
Elizabeth	United Kingdom	The ship was driven ashore at Southampton.
Fame, and Maria	United Kingdom	The sloop Fame was driven into the brig Maria at Scarborough, Yorkshire. Both vessels were damaged, Maria severely.
Fortitude	United Kingdom	The ship was driven ashore on the Sandwich Flats. She was on a voyage from London to Rio de Janeiro, Brazil Fortitude was refloated on 7 April and taken in to Ramsgate.
Francis	United States	The ship was lost between Portland, Dorset and The Needles, Isle of Wight. Four crew were rescued. She was on a voyage from Savannah, Georgia, to Bremen.
Friends Desire	United Kingdom	The lighter was driven ashore at Rye. Her crew were rescued. She was on a voyage from Plymouth, Devon to Southampton, Hampshire.
Friendship	United Kingdom	The ship was driven ashore between Corton and Great Yarmouth. Her crew were rescued.
George	United Kingdom	The brig was wrecked on the Kentish Knock, in the North Sea off the coast of Kent.
Glory	United Kingdom	The ship was driven ashore at Ramsgate. She was on a voyage from London to Montserrat. Glory was refloated on 9 March and taken in to Ramsgate.
Hamsley	United Kingdom	The ship foundered in The Solent. Her crew were rescued by a pilot boat.
Hannah	United Kingdom	The collier was driven ashore at Ramsgate. She was later refloated and taken in to Ramsgate.
Hannah	United Kingdom	The ship was driven ashore in Sandwich Bay, Kent. She was on a voyage from London to Brest, Finistère, France.
Hartley	United Kingdom	The brig was run down and sunk off Ramgate by a Swedish vessel. She was on a voyage from South Shields to London.
Hope	United Kingdom	The ship was severely damaged at Bridlington.
Industry	United Kingdom	The ship was driven ashore in the River Tweed.
Jeune Cecile	France	The ship was wrecked near Start Point, Devon. She was on a voyage from the West Indies to Caen, Calvados.
Kingston	United Kingdom	The ship sank at Southampton.
La Mercuria	France	The ship was driven ashore and wrecked at Portland, Dorset, United Kingdom with the loss of all hands, between 20 and 30 people.
Liberty	United Kingdom	The ship was driven ashore at Lymington, Hampshire. She was refloated on 9 March.
Lucy	United Kingdom	The ship was wrecked on the Laugharne Sands. She was on a voyage from Waterford to Jersey, Channel Islands.
Maria	Sweden	The schooner was damaged at Penzance.
Marquis of Wellington	British East India Company	The East Indiaman was driven ashore and wrecked at Margate, Kent.
Martha	United Kingdom	The ship foundered in the Irish Sea of Douglas, Isle of Man with the loss of all hands. She was on a voyage from Dublin to Whitehaven, Cumberland.
Martha	United Kingdom	The ship was driven ashore at Great Yarmouth. Her crew were rescued.
Mary	United Kingdom	The ship was driven ashore between Corton and Great Yarmouth. Her crew were rescued. She was on a voyage from King's Lynn, Norfolk to Bristol, Gloucestershire. Mary was refloated on 10 March, and taken in to Great Yarmouth.
Mary	United Kingdom	The ship was driven ashore on Coquet Island, Northumberland. She was on a voyage from South Shields to London.
Mary	United Kingdom	The ship was severely damaged at Bridlington.
Mary Ann	United Kingdom	The ship was driven ashore at Poole, Dorset. She was on a voyage from Gibraltar to Waterford and Newfoundland, British North America. Mary Ann was later refloated.
Mercure	France	The ship was driven ashore and wrecked at Portland, Dorset with the loss of all hands, at least four lives.
Metcalf	United Kingdom	The sloop was driven ashore in the River Humber at Hull, Yorkshire. She was on a voyage from London to Leeds, Yorkshire. Metcalf was later refloated and taken in to Hull. a
Minerva	United Kingdom	The ship was driven ashore at Ramsgate. She was on a voyage from London to Demerara. Minerva was refloated on 8 March and taken in to Ramsgate.
Minerva	United Kingdom	The ship was destroyed by fire at Ullapool, Ross-shire. She was on a voyage from Liverpool to New York, United States.
Minerva	United Kingdom	The ship was severely damaged at Milford when another vessel was driven into her during a gale. She was on a voyage from Limerick to London.
Nayade	United Kingdom	The galiot was driven ashore at Cowes, Isle of Wight.
Parker & Sons	United Kingdom	The ship was driven ashore at Birkenhead, Cheshire. She was on a voyage from Liverpool to New Orleans, Louisiana, United States. Parker & Sons was later refloated and taken in to Liverpool.
Patriot	United Kingdom	The ship was severely damaged at Bridlington.
Peace	United Kingdom	The brig was wrecked near Prior's Haven, County Durham with the loss of a crew member. She was on a voyage from London to North Shields, Northumberland.
Prince Edward	United Kingdom	The ship was driven ashore at Southampton.
Providence	United Kingdom	The sloop was driven ashore in the River Humber at Hull. She was on a voyage from Leeds to London. Providence was later refloated and taken in to Hull.
Queen Charlotte	United Kingdom	The ship was driven ashore at Southampton.
Rambler	United Kingdom	The ship was driven ashore and wrecked at Southampton.
Rover	United Kingdom	The ship was wrecked on the Maplin Sand, in the North Sea off the coast of Essex. She was on a voyage from Newcastle upon Tyne to London.
Sandwich	United Kingdom	The ship Post Office packet ship was driven ashore and damaged at Milford. She was later refloated.
Speedwell	United Kingdom	The brigantine was wrecked on the Steel Rocks, in the North Sea off Whitburn, Northumberland with the loss of three of the nine people on board.
Speedwell	United Kingdom	The ship was driven ashore and wrecked near Sunderland with the loss of two lives.
Théresa	France	The ship was driven ashore at Rye. Her crew were rescued. She was on a voyage from Toulon, Var to Havre de Grâce, Seine-Inférieure.
Thomas	United Kingdom	The ship was driven ashore at Ramsgate. She was on a voyage from London to Saint Vincent, Virgin Islands. Thomas was refloated on 8 March and taken in to Ramsgate.
Triton	Denmark	The galiot was driven ashore in Stokes Bay. She was on a voyage from Copenhagen to Bordeaux, Gironde, France. Triton was refloated on 3 April and taken in to Cowes.
Ulrica	United Kingdom	The ship was driven ashore and damaged at Ramsgate. She was on a voyage from London to Maranhão, Brazil.
William and James	United Kingdom	The ship was severely damaged at Bridlington.
Wray	United Kingdom	The ship was severely damaged at Bridlington.
Wohlfarth	Sweden	The ship was driven ashore at Ramsgate. She was on a voyage from Amsterdam, North Holland, Netherlands to Sicily. Wohlfarth was refloated on 24 March and taken in to Ramsgate.
Unnamed vessels	United Kingdom	Threee or four ships were driven ashore in Douglas Bay.

=== 5 March ===
List of shipwrecks: 5 March 1818
Ship	State	Description
Amity	United Kingdom	The ship ran aground on the Gunfleet Sand. She was on a voyage from Danzig to London. Amity was refloated on 20 March and taken in to the River Thames.
Ant	United Kingdom	The ship was driven ashore and damaged at Southampton, Hampshire.
Assiduous	United Kingdom	The ship was driven ashore at Portsmouth, Hampshire.
Catharine	United Kingdom	The ship was driven ashore at Lowestoft, Suffolk. She was on a voyage from Peterhead, Aberdeenshire to Lisbon, Portugal. Catharine was later refloated and taken in to Great Yarmouth, Norfolk.
Christopher Gore	United States	The ship was wrecked on the Haaks Bank, in the North Sea with the loss of all but three of her crew. She was on a voyage from New York to Amsterdam, North Holland, Netherlands.
Clotilde	United States	The ship was lost off Cape Henry, Virginia, with the loss of eleven lives. She was on a voyage from New Orleans, Louisiana, to Philadelphia, Pennsylvania.
Duke of Wellington	United Kingdom	The ship was driven ashore and damaged at Southampton.
Ebenezer	United Kingdom	The ship was driven ashore at Corton, Suffolk.
Elizabeth	United Kingdom	The ship was driven ashore and damaged at Southampton.
Friendship	United Kingdom	The ship was driven ashore at Corton. Her crew were rescued. She was on a voyage from Wisbech, Cambridgeshire to London. Friendship was later refloated and taken in to Great Yarmouth.
Helmsley	United Kingdom	The ship foundered at Spithead, Hampshire. Her crew were rescued. She was on a voyage from Sunderland, County Durham to Portsmouth.
Johanna Dorothea	Greifswald	The ship was driven ashore near Helsingør, Denmark. She was on a voyage from Greifswald to London. Johanna Dorothea was later refloated and put into Copenhagen, Denmark for repairs.
Leander	United Kingdom	The ship was driven ashore and wrecked 5 nautical miles (9.3 km) south of Peterhead, Aberdeenshire with the loss of all but two of her crew.
Malta	United Kingdom	The brig was driven ashore at the Cape of Good Hope.
Martha	United Kingdom	The ship was driven ashore at Great Yarmouth. She was on a voyage from North Shields, Northumberland to London.
Martha	United Kingdom	The ship foundered off Varberg, Sweden. Her crew were rescued.
Nayade	Netherlands	The ship was driven ashore at Cowes, Isle of Wight, United Kingdom. She was on a voyage from Amsterdam to Mahón, Mallorca, Spain.
Prince Edward	United Kingdom	The ship was driven ashore and severely damaged at Southampton.
Princess of Wales	United States	The ship was wrecked on Seguin's Ledge with the loss of seven of her crew. She was on a voyage from Jamaica to Bath, Maine.
Queen Charlotte	United Kingdom	The ship was driven ashore and damaged at Southampton.
Rambler	United Kingdom	The ship was driven ashore and wrecked at Southampton.
Ruby	United Kingdom	The ship was wrecked on the Paternoster Rocks, in the North Sea. Her crew were rescued. She was on a voyage from Sunderland to Copenhagen, Denmark.
Stockton	United Kingdom	The ship was driven ashore at Lowestoft. She was on a voyage from Sunderland to London. Stockton was later refloated and taken in to Great Yarmouth.
Triton	United Kingdom	The ship was driven ashore at Hell Head, Isle of Wight. She was on a voyage from Copenhagen, Denmark to Bordeaux, Gironde, France.

=== 6 March ===
List of shipwrecks: 6 March 1818
Ship	State	Description
Caroline	United Kingdom	The ship ran aground. She was on a voyage from Demerara to London. She was refloated and put back to Demerara.

=== 7 March ===
List of shipwrecks: 7 March 1818
Ship	State	Description
Betsey	United Kingdom	The ship was driven ashore and wrecked at Ramsgate, Kent.
Drie Geboreders	Netherlands	The ship was driven ashore near Saint-Martin-de-Ré, Charente-Inférieure, France. She was on a voyage from Bordeaux, Gironde, France, to Rotterdam, South Holland.
Hannah	United Kingdom	The ship was driven ashore on the Sandwich Flats, Kent. She was on a voyage from New Brunswick, British North America, to London. Hannah was refloated on 24 March and taken in to Ramsgate.
Jane	United Kingdom	The ship was driven ashore and wrecked at Ramsgate.
Malta	United Kingdom	The ship was wrecked in Table Bay.
Mary	United Kingdom	The ship was driven ashore at Newhaven, Sussex. She was on a voyage from Malta to London.
Unnamed	France	The ship capsized and sank off the South Foreland, Kent with the loss of all on board. She was on a voyage from Dunkerque, Nord to Ramsgate.

=== 8 March ===
List of shipwrecks: 8 March 1818
Ship	State	Description
Celestine	France	The ship was driven ashore at Dunkerque, Nord and was abandoned by her crew. She was on a voyage from Guadeloupe to Havre de Grâce, Seine-Inférieure. Celestine subsequently refloated and was taken in to Ostend, West Flanders, Netherlands the next day.
John	United Kingdom	The West Indiaman was driven ashore in Great River, Jamaica. She was refloated.
La Marie	United Kingdom	The ship was driven ashore on Terschelling, Friesland, Netherlands. She was on a voyage from London to Rotterdam, South Holland, Netherlands.

=== 9 March ===
List of shipwrecks: 9 March 1818
Ship	State	Description
Enterprize	United States	The ship was lost off Belize. Her crew were rescued. She was on a voyage from the Turks Islands to New Orleans, Louisiana.
Jane & Eliza	United Kingdom	The ship was driven ashore near Petten, North Holland, Netherlands with the loss of all but three of her crew.
Prudent	United Kingdom	The ship was wrecked on the north coast of Guernsey, Channel Islands with the loss of nine of the eleven people on board. She was on a voyage from Lisbon, Portugal to Antwerp, Netherlands.
Zenophon	United States	The ship ran aground on the Haaks Bank, in the North Sea and was consequently beached. She was on a voyage from Charleston, South Carolina, to Amsterdam, North Holland.

=== 10 March ===
List of shipwrecks: 10 March 1818
Ship	State	Description
Active	United Kingdom	The ship ran aground off the Île d'Oléron, Charente-Inférieure, France. She was on a voyage from Málaga, Spain to Bordeaux, Gironde, France.
Adventure	United Kingdom	The ship was driven ashore and wrecked at Fanø, Denmark. Her crew survived. She was on a voyage from London to Hamburg.
Amelia	United Kingdom	The ship was driven at Liverpool, Lancashire. She was on a voyage from New Orleans, Louisiana, to Waterford and Liverpool. She was refloated and take in to Liverpool.
Carolina	Portugal	The schooner was driven ashore and wrecked near L'Orient, Morbihan, France, with the loss of all but two of her crew. She was on a voyage from Cork, United Kingdom to Lisbon.
Dublin	United Kingdom	The ship was lost at La Teste-de-Buch, Gironde, France. Six of her crew were rescued. She was on a voyage from Dublin to Jamaica.
Elizabeth & Ann	United Kingdom	The ship was driven ashore on Goree, South Holland, Netherlands. She was on a voyage from London to Rotterdam, South Holland. Elizabeth & Ann was later refloated and resumed her voyage.
George	United Kingdom	The ship was wrecked on the Swin Bottoms, in the North Sea off the mouth of the Humber. She was on a voyage from South Shields, County Durham to Copenhagen, Denmark.
Gertrude	France	The ship was driven ashore at Calais. She was on a voyage from Newcastle upon Tyne, Northumberland, United Kingdom to Caen, Calvados. Gertrude was refloated on 24 March and taken in to Calais.
Good Hope	United Kingdom	The ship foundered in the Bay of Biscay off the Île d'Oléron.
Holland	United States	The ship was driven ashore at Étaples, Pas-de-Calais, France. She was on a voyage from Charleston, South Carolina, to Amsterdam, North Holland, Netherlands.
Jane	United Kingdom	The brig sank on the Nordvogelsand, off Hamburg.
Martha	United Kingdom	The ship foundered in Douglas Bay with the loss of all hands.
Portugal Invincival	Portugal	The ship was wrecked at Oporto. Her crew were rescued. She was on a voyage from Rio de Janeiro, Brazil to Vigo, Spain and Oporto.
Seven Brothers	United Kingdom	The ship ran aground on the Newarp Sand, in the North Sea off the coast of Norfolk. She was refloated and resumed her voyage to London in a leaky condition, having taken on three more hands.
Unnamed	United States	The schooner was wrecked near the Cordouan Lighthouse, Gironde, France with the loss of all on board.
Unnamed	United Kingdom	The brig ran aground on the Newarp sand and sank.
Several unnamed vessels	Flags unknown	Threee or four ships were driven ashore in Douglas Bay.

=== 11 March ===
List of shipwrecks: 11 March 1818
Ship	State	Description
Eliza	United Kingdom	The ship was driven ashore and wrecked near Plouescat, Finistère. All on board were rescued. She was on a voyage from Bristol, Gloucestershire to Jamaica.
Elizabeth Ann	United Kingdom	The sloop was driven ashore on Goree, South Holland, Netherlands.
Increase	United States	The ship was abandoned off Saint-Jean-de-Luz, Basses-Pyrénées. She was on a voyage from Marblehead, Massachusetts, to Bilbao, Spain. She subsequently came ashore.
John Winsloe	United Kingdom	The ship was driven ashore near Calshot Castle, Hampshire. She was on a voyage from Savannah, Georgia, United States to London.
Rose	United Kingdom	The ship was driven ashore and wrecked near Boulogne, Pas-de-Calais, France. She was on a voyage from Lyme, Dorset to Aberdeen.
Thomas	United Kingdom	The ship was wrecked on the Goodwin Sands, Kent with the loss of all hands. She was on a voyage from Charleston, South Carolina, United States to London.

=== 12 March ===
List of shipwrecks: 12 March 1818
Ship	State	Description
Ann	United Kingdom	The ship was driven ashore in the Demerara River. She was on a voyage from Georgetown, British Guiana to Liverpool, Lancashire. She was refloated.
Bardwell	United Kingdom	The ship was driven ashore at Orford, Suffolk. Her crew were rescued. She was on a voyage from London to Southwold, Suffolk.
Dorothy	United Kingdom	The ship was driven ashore and wrecked on the Île d'Oléron, Charente-Inférieure, France. Her crew were rescued. She was on a voyage from Bristol, Gloucestershire to Jamaica.
Elbe	United Kingdom	The whaler was driven ashore at Rattray Head, Aberdeenshire. She was on a voyage from Aberdeen to the Davis Strait.
Free Briton	United Kingdom	The ship was driven ashore at Orford. Her crew were rescued. She was on a voyage from Leeds, Yorkshire to Colchester, Essex.
Mary	United Kingdom	The ship sank at Greenock, Renfrewshire.
Thames	United Kingdom	The full-rigged ship was wrecked on the Goodwin Sands, Kent. She was on a voyage from Charleston, South Carolina, United States to London.
Zealand	Netherlands	The ship capsized at Ramsgate, Kent, United Kingdom. She was on a voyage from Middelburg, Zeeland to Cádiz, Spain.

=== 13 March ===
List of shipwrecks: 13 March 1818
Ship	State	Description
George	United Kingdom	The sloop foundered in the Irish Sea off Wexford. She was on a voyage from Liverpool, Lancashire, to Waterford.
Gipsey	United States	The ship ran aground on the Man o' War Shoals. She was on a voyage from Palermo, Kingdom of the Two Sicilies to Baltimore, Maryland. She was refloated and completed her voyage, arriving on 15 March.
Hero	United Kingdom	The ship ran aground at Leith, Lothian. She was on a voyage from Danzig to Leith.
Young Sachem	United States	The ship was lost in the Bahamas. She was on a voyage from Boston, Massachusetts, to New Orleans, Louisiana.

=== 14 March ===
List of shipwrecks: 14 March 1818
Ship	State	Description
Dispatch	United Kingdom	The ship was wrecked at Breaksea Point, Glamorgan. Her crew were rescued. She was on a voyage from Bristol, Gloucestershire to Barnstaple, Devon.
Increase	United States	The ship was abandoned in the Bay of Biscay off Saint-Jean-de-Luz, Basses-Pyrénées, France and subsequently came ashore there. She was on a voyage from Marblehead, Massachusetts, to Bilbao, Spain.
Russel	United Kingdom	The brig ran aground and was subsequently wrecked at Newhaven, Sussex. She was on a voyage from South Shields, County Durham to Newhaven.
Unnamed	France	The schooner capsized in the English Channel off Dover, Kent. United Kingdom with the loss of all on board. She was on a voyage from Dunkerque, Nord to Ramsgate, Kent.

=== 15 March ===
List of shipwrecks: 15 March 1818
Ship	State	Description
Cardiff Castle	United Kingdom	The sloop was destroyed by fire near Minehead, Somerset. Her crew were rescued.
Friends Increase	United Kingdom	The ship was driven ashore at Dungeness, Kent.
Summer	United Kingdom	The ship sank at Ramsgate, Kent. She was on a voyage from Great Yarmouth, Norfolk to Ramsgate.

=== 18 March ===
List of shipwrecks: 18 March 1818
Ship	State	Description
Jonge Hermanus	Netherlands	The ship ran aground on Sylt, Duchy of Holstein. She was on a voyage from Hull, Yorkshire, United Kingdom to Amsterdam, North Holland.

=== 19 March ===
List of shipwrecks: 19 March 1818
Ship	State	Description
Nova Aurora	Portugal	The ship was captured by the privateer Patriota ( Brazilian insurgents) whilst on a voyage from Bahia, United Kingdom of Portugal, Brazil and the Algarves, to Oporto. She was set afire and sunk.
Serpente	Portugal	The ship was captured by the privateer Patriota ( Brazilian insurgents) whilst bound for Rio Grande do Sol, Brazil. She was set afire and sunk.
Unnamed	United Kingdom	The brig capsized off Goree-Overflakkee, Zeeland, Netherlands.

=== 20 March ===
List of shipwrecks: 20 March 1818
Ship	State	Description
Agenoria	United Kingdom	The ship was wrecked at Portsoy, Aberdeenshire. Her crew were rescued.
Ruby	United Kingdom	The ship departed from Montrose, Forfarshire for Riga, Russia. No further trace, presumed foundered with the loss of all hands.

=== 21 March ===
List of shipwrecks: 21 March 1818
Ship	State	Description
Cottage	United Kingdom	The ship departed from Leith, Lothian for Exeter, Devon. No further trace, presumed foundered with the loss of all hands.
Sophia	United Kingdom	The ship sank at Brest, Finistère, France.

=== 22 March ===
List of shipwrecks: 22 March 1818
Ship	State	Description
British Trader	United Kingdom	The brig struck the Memory Bank, off the Bahamas. She was on a voyage from Jamaica to Greenock, Renfrewshire. British Trader was later refloated.
Desire	United Kingdom	The ship was driven ashore at Portsmouth, Hampshire. She was on a voyage from Sunderland, County Durham to Portsmouth. Desire was refloated and taken in to Portsmouth, where she sank.
Elizabeth	United Kingdom	The full-rigged ship was wrecked on the Memory Bank. She was on a voyage from Jamaica to the Clyde.
Sarah	United Kingdom	The ship was driven ashore and damaged at Beaumaris, Anglesey. She was on a voyage from Liverpool, Lancashire, to A Coruña, Spain. Sarah was later refloated.
Satellite	Portugal	The schooner was driven ashore and wrecked near Bahia, United Kingdom of Portugal, Brazil and the Algarves. She was on a voyage from Bahia to Alagoas.
Summer	United Kingdom	The ship sank at Great Yarmouth, Norfolk.
Tartar	United Kingdom	The ship was driven ashore near Stranraer, County Antrim. She was on a voyage from Belfast, County Antrim to Danzig. Tartar was refloated on 24 March and resumed her voyage.
Trader	United Kingdom	The ship ran aground on the Little Bahama Bank. She was on a voyage from Jamaica to Greenock, Renfrewshire. Trader was later refloated and resumed her voyage.
Two Brothers	United Kingdom	The ship was wrecked on the Little Bahama Bank. She was on a voyage from New Orleans, Louisiana, to Liverpool, Lancashire.

=== 23 March ===
List of shipwrecks: 23 March 1818
Ship	State	Description
Adams	United Kingdom	The ship was driven ashore near Beaumaris, Anglesey. She was on a voyage from Liverpool, Lancashire to A Coruña, Spain.
Charles	United Kingdom	The ship was driven ashore in the Scheldt at Antwerp, Netherlands. She was on a voyage from Antwerp to Liverpool, Lancashire. She was refloated and found to be severely leaky.
Flora	Prussia	The ship was driven ashore near Memel. She was on a voyage from Hull, Yorkshire, United Kingdom to Memel. Flora was refloated on 31 March and taken in to Memel.
Jane	(United Kingdom of Great Britain and Ireland) Jamaica	The schooner capsized off the Isle of Pines, Cuba with some loss of life. She was on a voyage from Kingston to New Orleans, Louisiana.
Sarah	United Kingdom	The ship was driven ashore and damaged at Marazion, Cornwall. She was on a voyage from Oporto, Portugal to Bristol, Gloucestershire. Sarah was later refloated.

=== 24 March ===
List of shipwrecks: 24 March 1818
Ship	State	Description
Dumbarton Castle	(United Kingdom of Great Britain and Ireland) Antigua	The ship was lost whilst on a voyage from North Carolina, United States to Antigua. Her crew were rescued.
Goede Verwachting	Netherlands	The ship was driven ashore. She was on a voyage from Amsterdam, North Holland to Lisbon, Portugal. She was refloated an put in to Dover, Kent, United Kingdom in a leaky condition.

=== 25 March ===
List of shipwrecks: 25 March 1818
Ship	State	Description
Albion	United Kingdom	The ship ran aground on the Vogel Sand, in the North Sea.
Assiduous	United Kingdom	The ship was driven ashore at Neath, Glamorgan. She was on a voyage from Neath to London.
Belt	United Kingdom	The ship was wrecked at Memel, Prussia. Her crew were rescued. She was on a voyage from South Shields, County Durham to Memel.
Ganges	United Kingdom	The ship ran aground in the River Mersey at Liverpool, Lancashire, and was damaged. She was on a voyage from Liverpool to Cork. Ganges was later refloated.
Halcyon	United Kingdom	The ship was driven ashore at Liverpool. She was on a voyage from Liverpool to Philadelphia, Pennsylvania, United States.

=== 26 March ===
List of shipwrecks: 26 March 1818
Ship	State	Description
William	United Kingdom	The brig was driven ashore and wrecked at Calais, France, with the loss of one of her fifteen crew. She was on a voyage from Newcastle-upon-Tyne, Northumberland to Brest, Finistère, France.
Unnamed	United Kingdom	The sloop capsized in the Humber with the loss of four of the seven people on board.

=== 27 March ===
List of shipwrecks: 27 March 1818
Ship	State	Description
Pursuit	United Kingdom	The ship was wrecked on Anholt, Denmark. Her crew were rescued.

=== 29 March ===
List of shipwrecks: 29 March 1818
Ship	State	Description
General Marion	United States	The ship was driven ashore and wrecked at Hempstead, New York. She was on a voyage from the Cape Verde Islands to New York City.
Lord Lyndock	United Kingdom	The ship ran aground in the River Plate. She was refloated on 3 April. Lord Lyndock was on a voyage from Rio de Janeiro, Brazil to Buenos Aires, Argentina.
Speculator	United Kingdom	The ship was driven ashore and wrecked on the Isle of Wight. She was on a voyage from Dover, Kent to Jersey, Channel Islands.
Swea	Portugal	The ship departed from Livorno, Grand Duchy of Tuscany for Lisbon. No further trace, presumed foundered with the loss of all hands.

=== 30 March ===
List of shipwrecks: 30 March 1818
Ship	State	Description
Peter & Emma	United Kingdom	The ship was driven ashore near Brouwershaven, Zeeland, Netherlands. She was on a voyage from Rotterdam, South Holland, Netherlands to Gibraltar.

=== 31 March ===
List of shipwrecks: 31 March 1818
Ship	State	Description
Dinas	United Kingdom	The ship struck the Runnel Stone and sank. Her crew were rescued. She was on a voyage from Caernarfon to London.
Dolphin	United Kingdom	The ship was run down and sunk in the Atlantic Ocean off Land's End, Cornwall, by the schooner George ( United Kingdom). Her crew were rescued by Newlyn fishermen. Dolphin was on a voyage from Great Yarmouth, Norfolk to Milford, Pembrokeshire.

=== Unknown date ===
List of shipwrecks: Unknown date in March 1818
Ship	State	Description
Alexander	France	The ship was wrecked near New Providence, Bahamas. She was on a voyage from Bordeaux, Gironde to Havana, Cuba.
Alpha	United Kingdom	The ship was wrecked in the Delaware River.
Amor de Patria	Portugal	The ship was driven ashore and wrecked near Vigo, Spain. She was on a voyage from Bahia, Brazil to Oporto
Ann and Isabella	United Kingdom	The ship foundered off the mouth of the River Foyle with the loss of all hands. She was on a voyage from Wick, Caithness to Londonderry.
Annie	United Kingdom	The ship was driven ashore on the Isle of Bute in mid-March. She was on a voyage from Belfast, County Down to the Clyde.
Betsey	United Kingdom	The ship was driven ashore in West Loch Tarbert, Argyllshire. She was on a voyage from the Clyde to Belfast, County Antrim.
Dublin Packet	United States	The ship was driven ashore at Waterford, United Kingdom. She was later refloated.
Friendship	United Kingdom	The ship ran aground on the Trinity Sand, in the Humber. She was on a voyage from South Shields, County Durham to London. She was refloated and taken in to Hull, Yorkshire in a leaky condition.
Glory	United States	The ship ran aground at the mouth of the Pará River. She was on a voyage from Maranhão to Pará, Brazil. Glory was refloated and taken in to port, but was condemned.
Hannah	United Kingdom	The ship was driven ashore near Copenhagen, Denmark. She was on a voyage from Whitby, Yorkshire to a Baltic port. She was refloated and taken in to Copenhagen, where she arrived in a leaky condition on 13 March.
Hibernia	United Kingdom	The ship foundered off North Uist, Outer Hebrides with the loss of all hands. She was on a voyage from Liverpool, Lancashire, to Sligo.
Jane	United Kingdom	The brig is presumed to have foundered in the North Sea off Nordervogelsang, Duchy of Holstein on or before 4 March.
Julian Thomas	France	The ship was driven ashore and wrecked at Saint-Valery-sur-Somme, Somme. She was on a voyage from Marseille, Bouches-du-Rhône to Havre de Grâce, Seine-Inférieure.
La Caroline	France	The sloop was wrecked on the Dutch coast.
Lily	(United Kingdom of Great Britain and Ireland) Antigua	The schooner was wrecked in the Grenadines with the loss of all but her captain.
Lord Wellington	United Kingdom	The ship was wrecked on the Mouse Sand, in the North Sea off Margate, Kent. All on board were rescued.
Mary	United Kingdom	The ship was driven ashore in the Courantyne River, Surinam. She was refloated and taken to Barbados where she was condemned.
Medway	United Kingdom	The ship ran aground on the Swine Bottoms, in the Baltic Sea. She was on a voyage from London to Memel, Prussia.
Onderneeming	Netherlands	The ship was driven ashore on Terschelling, Friesland before 3 March. She was refloated on that date. Onderneeming was on a voyage from Berbice to Amsterdam, North Holland.
Rose	France	The ship was driven ashore near L'Aiguillon-sur-Mer, Vendée. She was on a voyage from Bordeaux to Tenerife, Canary Islands. Rose was refloated on 24 March and put into La Rochelle, Charente-Inférieure for repairs.
Shakespeare	United Kingdom	The ship was lost in the Abaco Islands.
Speculation	Netherlands	The ship was driven ashore on the Île de Batz, Finistère, France. She was on a voyage from Antwerp to Barcelona, Spain.
Victory	United Kingdom	The ship ran aground on the Blyth Sand. She was on a voyage from Bengal, India to London. Victory was later refloated.
Watson	United Kingdom	The brig was wrecked in the Shetland Islands.
William Flounders	United Kingdom	The ship was lost near South Uist, Outer Hebrides. Her crew were rescued. She was on a voyage from Limerick to Liverpool.
Wilkin	United Kingdom	The ship foundered in the English Channel on or before 29 March. A boat from the ship was found off Calais, France, by HMS Pioneer (Royal Navy).
William	United Kingdom	The ship struck rocks and was damaged. She was on a voyage from Bristol, Gloucestershire to Oporto, Portugal. She put in to Quimper, Finistère on 13 March.
Unnamed	Sweden	The ship was lost off Ouessant, Finistère, France before 18 March.

== April ==
=== 1 April ===
List of shipwrecks: 1 April 1818
Ship	State	Description
Keddington	United Kingdom	The ship was wrecked on Attwood's Key. Her crew were rescued. She was on a voyage from Jamaica to London.

=== 2 April ===
List of shipwrecks: 2 April 1818
Ship	State	Description
Goed Hoop	Netherlands	The ship was sighted off Sheerness, Kent, United Kingdom whilst bound for Antwerp. No further trace, presumed foundered in the North Sea with the loss of all hands.
Lily	United Kingdom	The ship ran aground on the Herd Sand, in the North Sea. She was on a voyage from South Shields, County Durham to Dordrecht, South Holland, Netherlands. Lily was refloated on 4 April and taken in to South Shields.
Molly	United Kingdom	The ship was driven ashore and severely damaged at St. Ives, Cornwall. She was on a voyage from Minehead, Somerset to Hayle, Cornwall. Molly was later refloated and taken in to St. Ives.
Socalker	Norway	The ship sprang a leak and foundered 50 nautical miles (93 km) off Ballyshannon, County Donegal, United Kingdom. Her crew were rescued by Janet (United Kingdom). Socalker was on a voyage from Ballyshannon to Trondheim.

=== 3 April ===
List of shipwrecks: 3 April 1818
Ship	State	Description
Rover	United Kingdom	The ship was driven ashore on Anholt, Denmark. Her crew were rescued. She was on a voyage from South Shields, County Durham to Stettin.
Shellalagh	United Kingdom	The ship ran aground on the Arklow Banks, in the Irish Sea off the coast of County Wicklow and lost her rudder. She was consenquently driven ashore and wrecked at Wexford. all on board were rescued. She was on a voyage from London to Belfast, county Antrim.

=== 4 April ===
List of shipwrecks: 4 April 1818
Ship	State	Description
Maria	United Kingdom	The ship was wrecked on the Shipwash Sand, in the North Sea. Her crew were rescued. She was on a voyage from South Shields, County Durham to London.
Nieuve Hope	Prussia	The ship foundered in the Baltic Sea 30 nautical miles (56 km) off Pillau with the loss of all hands. She was on a voyage from Königsberg to Newcastle upon Tyne, Northumberland, United Kingdom.

=== 5 April ===
List of shipwrecks: 5 April 1818
Ship	State	Description
Hope	United Kingdom	The ship struck a rock and sank at Achil Head. Her crew were rescued. She was on a voyage from Liverpool, Lancashire, to Newport Pratt, County Mayo.
Louisa	United Kingdom	The ship was driven ashore near Littlehampton, Sussex and capsized. She was on a voyage from Arundel, Sussex to Swansea, Glamorgan.
Matthew	United Kingdom	The ship was wrecked whilst on a voyage from Waterford to Galway.

=== 6 April ===
List of shipwrecks: 6 April 1818
Ship	State	Description
Lady Stanley	United Kingdom	The ship foundered whilst on a voyage from Liverpool, Lancashire, to Gibraltar. Her crew were rescued by Echo (United Kingdom).
Laurel	United Kingdom	The ship was driven ashore and severely damaged at Dover, Kent. She was on a voyage from Aberdeen to Rye, Sussex. Laurel was refloated the next day and taken in to Dover.
Peggy	United Kingdom	The ship was wrecked in Carmarthen Bay. She was on a voyage from King's Lynn, Norfolk to Swansea, Glamorgan.
Platoff	United Kingdom	The ship was driven ashore near Helsingør, Denmark. She was on a voyage from Kiel, Duchy of Schleswig to Grangemouth, Stirlingshire.
Resolution	(United Kingdom of Great Britain and Ireland) Jersey	The ship was wrecked in Mount's Bay with the loss of three of her five crew. She was on a voyage from Jersey to Dublin.

=== 7 April ===
List of shipwrecks: 7 April 1818
Ship	State	Description
Commerce	United Kingdom	The ship ran aground on the Borucyra Shoal and capsized. She was on a voyage from Vigo, Spain, to a French port.
Providence	France	The ship was wrecked in Carmarthen Bay. She was on a voyage from Bordeaux, Gironde to Dunkerque, Nord.
Sonne	Prussia	The ship was lost near Skagen, Denmark. She was on a voyage from Königsberg to Bremen.
William	United Kingdom	The ship ran aground on the Barber Sand, in the North Sea. She was refloated but being leaky was beached at Great Yarmouth, Norfolk. William was on a voyage from King's Lynn, Norfolk to Plymouth, Devon.

=== 8 April ===
List of shipwrecks: 8 April 1818
Ship	State	Description
Cumberland	United Kingdom	The ship was driven ashore and wrecked at the mouth of the Potomac River, United States. She was on a voyage from Alexandria, Egypt to the West Indies
Lavinia	United Kingdom	The ship was lost near Ystad, Sweden. She was on a voyage from Danzig to Grangemouth, Stirlingshire.
Mary	United Kingdom	The ship was driven ashore at Varberg, Sweden. She was on a voyage from London to Stettin. Mary was later refloated.
Ocean	United Kingdom	The ship was driven ashore on the Île de Ré, Charente-Inférieure, France. She was on a voyage from Newcastle upon Tyne, Northumberland to the Charente.
Père de Famille	France	The brig was driven ashore at Lancing, Sussex, United Kingdom. She was on a voyage from Nantes, Loire-Inférieure to Calais. Père de Famille was later refloated and taken in to Shoreham-by-Sea, Sussex.

=== 9 April ===
List of shipwrecks: 9 April 1818
Ship	State	Description
Caledonia	United Kingdom	The ship was wrecked at Ballyteague, County Wexford, with the loss of three of her crew. She was on a voyage from Liverpool, Lancashire, to Prince Edward Island, British North America.
Carolina Johanna	Russia	The ship was driven ashore near "Zandszcort". She was on a voyage from St. Ubes, Portugal to Riga.
Retreat	United Kingdom	The brig ran aground in the Firth of Forth. She was on a voyage from Alloa, Clackmannanshire to Miramichi, New Brunswick, British North America.
Surat	United Kingdom	The sloop was lost off Boulogne, Pas-de-Calais, France with the loss of all on board.
Victoria	Sweden	The brig was driven ashore and wrecked between Marazion and Penzance, Cornwall, United Kingdom. She was on a voyage from Cette, Hérault, France to Rotterdam, South Holland, Netherlands.

=== 10 April ===
List of shipwrecks: 10 April 1818
Ship	State	Description
Marchioness of Anglesey	United Kingdom	The schooner was lost at Dulas, Anglesey with the loss of fifteen of the eighteen people on board. She was on a voyage from Liverpool, Lancashire, to Amlwch, Anglesey.
Nancy	United Kingdom	The ship was wrecked near Cemlyn, Anglesey. Four crew survived. She was on a voyage from Liverpool to Quebec, British North America.
Newry	United Kingdom	The ship was driven ashore and wrecked at Bray, County Wicklow with the loss of three lives. She was on a voyage from Liverpool to Newry, County Antrim.
Nika	Prussia	The ship was driven ashore on the Niding, in the Baltic Sea. She was on a voyage from Memel to Dublin, United Kingdom.
Pomona	United Kingdom	The ship was wrecked on the Caicos Bank. Her crew were rescued. She was on a voyage from Jamaica to Glasgow, Renfrewshire.
Swiftsure	United Kingdom	The sloop was wrecked on Carmel Point, Anglesey with the loss of all hands.

=== 11 April ===
List of shipwrecks: 11 April 1818
Ship	State	Description
Alexander	United Kingdom	The ship was driven ashore at Riga, Russia.
Beresford	United Kingdom	The ship was driven ashore at Portland, Dorset. She was on a voyage from South Shields, County Durham to Topsham, Devon.
Francis	France	The ship was driven ashore and wrecked at St. Ives, Cornwall, United Kingdom. Her crew were rescued. She was on a voyage from Marseille, Bouches-du-Rhône to Bordeaux, Gironde, France.
Henry	United Kingdom	The ship was driven ashore and wrecked at Red Wharf Bay, Anglesey. Her crew were rescued. She was on a voyage from Whitehaven, Cumberland to Pictou, Nova Scotia, British North America.
Jason	United Kingdom	The brig was driven ashore at Bridlington, Yorkshire.
Kitty	United Kingdom	The ship was driven ashore and wrecked at St. Ives. Her crew were rescued. She was on a voyage from Limerick to London.
Mary Ann	United Kingdom	The ship was driven ashore and wrecked at St. Ives. Her crew were rescued. She was on a voyage from Cádiz, Spain to Leith, Lothian.

=== 12 April ===
List of shipwrecks: 12 April 1818
Ship	State	Description
Ceres	Bremen	The ship foundered whilst on a voyage from Bremen to Cádiz, Spain. Her crew were rescued by Jonge Vrow Elizabeth (Netherlands).
Fortuna	France	The ship was driven ashore at "Pollet", Seine-Inférieure. She was on a voyage from Cette, Hérault to Saint-Valery-sur-Somme.
Friends	United Kingdom	The ship struck some rocks and was wrecked at Aberthaw, Glamorgan. All on board were rescued. She was on a voyage from Bristol, Gloucestershire to Carmarthen.
Industry	United Kingdom	The sloop was wrecked on the Sunk Sand, in the North Sea off the coast of Essex, with the loss of her captain. She was on a voyage from Gainsborough, Lincolnshire to London.
Resignation	United Kingdom	The ship ran aground on the Long Sand, in the North Sea off the coast of Essex. She was on a voyage from Cette, Hérault, France to Amsterdam, North Holland, Netherlands. She was refloated and put in to Ramsgate, Kent in a severely leaky condition.
Westbury	United Kingdom	The ship ran aground in Liverpool Bay. She was on a voyage from Liverpool, Lancashire to Newfoundland, British North America. She was refloated and put back to Liverpool.

=== 14 April ===
List of shipwrecks: 14 April 1818
Ship	State	Description
St. Charles	France	The ship was driven ashore at Dunkerque, Nord.
St. George	United Kingdom	The ship ran aground on the Goodwin Sands, Kent. She was on a voyage from Norway to Falmouth, Cornwall. St. George was refloated on 16 April and taken in to Ramsgate, Kent.
Vitoire	France	The ship struck an anchor and sank at Havre de Grâce, Seine-Inférieure.
William & Mary	United Kingdom	The ship ram aground on the Herd Sand, in the North Sea off the coast of County Durham. She was on a voyage from Chichester, Sussex to South Shields, County Durham. William & Mary was refloated but consequently had to be beached.

=== 15 April ===
List of shipwrecks: 15 April 1818
Ship	State	Description
Sophie	France	The galiot was driven ashore at "St. Roque".

=== 16 April ===
List of shipwrecks: 16 April 1818
Ship	State	Description
Mary Ann	United Kingdom	The ship was driven ashore at Alcochete, Portugal.
Solinde	Flag unknown	The ship was lost off Fehmarn, Duchy of Schleswig.
Traveller	United Kingdom	The ship was driven ashore at Alcochete.
Victoria	Sweden	The ship capsized at Gothenburg. She was refloated on 18 April.

=== 17 April ===
List of shipwrecks: 17 April 1818
Ship	State	Description
Aline	Lübeck	The brig was abandoned in the English Channel off Calais, France, with the loss of three of the eleven people on board. Survivors were rescued by a Dutch galiot. Aline was on a voyage from Hamburg to Liverpool, Lancashire, United Kingdom.
Continencen	Sweden	The ship ran aground in the Islas Sisargas, Spain. Her crew were rescued. She was on a voyage from Cork, United Kingdom to Lisbon, Portugal.
Friendship	United Kingdom	The brig was driven ashore and damaged at Catoira, Spain. Her crew were rescued. She was on a voyage from Liverpool to Trieste. Friendshiplater floated off and was taken in to Ferrol for repairs.
Tarleton	United Kingdom	The ship was driven ashore at the Cape of Good Hope. She was consequently condemned.

=== 18 April ===
List of shipwrecks: 18 April 1818
Ship	State	Description
Amphion	Russia	The ship was lost on "Salt Quay".
Numa	United States	The French frigate Néréide (France) ran down and sank Numa, of Baltimore, returning there in ballast from Amsterdam. The master and most of the crew jumped or were taken aboard the frigate. Lady Mary Pelham (United States) brought the mate and steward into New York.
Odessa	Russia	The ship was lost at the mouth of the Rhône.
Tarleton	United Kingdom	The ship ran aground and was wrecked at the Cape of Good Hope. She was on a voyage from Rio de Janeiro, Brazil, to the Cape of Good Hope.

=== 20 April ===
List of shipwrecks: 20 April 1818
Ship	State	Description
Lord Lyndock	United Kingdom	The ship was driven ashore in the River Plate 6 nautical miles (11 km) downstream of Buenos Aires, Argentina. She was refloated the next day.
Margaret	United Kingdom	The ship was driven ashore on the Spaniard Sand. She was on a voyage from Cardiff, Glamorgan to London.

=== 21 April ===
List of shipwrecks: 21 April 1818
Ship	State	Description
Caroline	United Kingdom	The ship was abandoned in ice off Cape North, Nova Scotia, British North America, with the loss of two of her crew.

=== 22 April ===
List of shipwrecks: 22 April 1818
Ship	State	Description
Clementina	United Kingdom	The ship was driven ashore and wrecked on the coast of Jutland. Her crew were rescued. She was on a voyage from Antwerp, Netherlands to Stettin.

=== 23 April ===
List of shipwrecks: 23 April 1818
Ship	State	Description
Diana	United Kingdom	The ship was beached at Beaumaris, Anglesey. She was on a voyage from Boston, Massachusetts, United States to Liverpool, Lancashire. Diana was refloated the next day.
Industry	United Kingdom	The ship was wrecked on the Heaps Sand, in the North Sea. Her crew were rescued. She was on a voyage from South Shields, County Durham to London.
Marli	(United Kingdom of Great Britain and Ireland) Grenada	The sloop struck a reef off Grenada and was damaged. She was later refloated and taken in to St. George's.
Paulina	Netherlands	The ship was destroyed by fire in the Niewe Diep.

=== 24 April ===
List of shipwrecks: 24 April 1818
Ship	State	Description
Patience Success	United Kingdom	The ship was abandoned by her crew in the North Sea off Cromer Norfolk and subsequently foundered.
Providence	United Kingdom	The ship was lost at the mouth of the Humber. Her crew were rescued. She was on a voyage from South Shields, County Durham to Gibraltar.
Unity	United Kingdom	The ship was driven ashore and wrecked on the coast of Lincolnshire 6 nautical miles (11 km) south of the mouth of the Humber with the loss of all hands.

=== 25 April ===
List of shipwrecks: 25 April 1818
Ship	State	Description
Patience Success	United Kingdom	The ship foundered in the North Sea off Cromer, Norfolk. Her crew survived.
Providence	United Kingdom	The ship foundered in the North Sea off the mouth of the Humber. Her crew were rescued. She was on a voyage from South Shields, County Durham to Gibraltar.

=== 27 April ===
List of shipwrecks: 27 April 1818
Ship	State	Description
Samuel and Sarah	United Kingdom	The ship ran aground on the Herd Sand, in the North Sea off the coast of County Durham. She was refloated and taken in to North Shields, Northumberland for repairs.
Solen	United Kingdom	The ship was struck by lightning in the Atlantic Ocean and consequently destroyed by fire. All on board, nearly 50 people, were rescued by Poacher (United Kingdom). Solen was on a voyage from London to New York, United States.
Thetis	United States	The ship was driven ashore on The Shingles. She was on a voyage from Rotterdam, South Holland, Netherlands to Baltimore, Maryland.
Wakefield	United Kingdom	The brig was wrecked on the Kentish Knock. Her crew were rescued. She was on a voyage from Antwerp, Netherlands to London
Venus	United Kingdom	The brig ran aground on the Kentish Knock and was severely damaged. She was later refloated and taken in to Margate, Kent.

=== 28 April ===
List of shipwrecks: 28 April 1818
Ship	State	Description
Amelia	United Kingdom	The ship was wrecked in the Jardines de la Reina, Cuba. She was on a voyage from Trinidad de Cuba to Cork.
Pallas	United Kingdom	The ship sprang a leak and foundered in the Atlantic Ocean (47°02′N 33°30′W). All on board were rescued by Fortune (United Kingdom). Pallas was on a voyage from Greenock, Renfrewshire to Miramichi Bay.

=== 29 April ===
List of shipwrecks: 29 April 1818
Ship	State	Description
Wakefield	United Kingdom	The brig was wrecked on the Kentish Knock, in the North Sea off Margate, Kent. Her crew were rescued. She was on a voyage from Antwerp, Netherlands to London.

=== Unknown date ===
List of shipwrecks: Unknown date in April 1818
Ship	State	Description
Britannia	United Kingdom	The ship was destroyed by fire in Hudson Bay in early April.
Caroline	United Kingdom	The ship was damaged by ice in the Atlantic Ocean and was abandoned by her crew.
Elizabeth	United Kingdom	The ship was wrecked on the Little Bahama Bank. She was on a voyage from Jamaica to Liverpool, Lancashire.
Endeavour	Prussia	The brig was driven ashore and wrecked at Plymouth, Devon, United Kingdom.
Forskin	Denmark	The ship was lost near Harburg, Hamburg.
Good Hoop	Netherlands	The ship was off Sheerness, Kent, United Kindgom in early April. She was on a voyage from London, United Kingdom to Antwerp. No further trace.
Gotha	Sweden	The ship was sunk by ice in the White Sea. She was on a voyage from Gothenburg to Arkhangelsk, Russia.
Hadlow	United Kingdom	The full-rigged ship collided with the transport ship Wyton (United Kingdom) in the English Channel. Subsequently repaired and returned to service.
Hannah	(United Kingdom of Great Britain and Ireland) Grenada	The drogher was wrecked on the South Reef, off "La Boge" in late April.
King George	United Kingdom	The ship was wrecked on the Biminies, off New Providence, Bahamas. She was on a voyage from Jamaica to London.
Madelina	Grand Duchy of Tuscany	The ship was driven ashore and wrecked at Troy, Ottoman Empire. She was on a voyage from Genoa to Constantinople, Ottoman Empire.
Maria	United Kingdom	The brig was wrecked on the Shipwash Sand, in the North Sea off the coast of Essex. Her crew survived.
Nancy & Mary	United Kingdom	The ship sprang a leak off Cape Ann, Massachusetts, United States and was beached at the mouth of the Kennebec River. She was on a voyage from Boston, Massachusetts, to Liverpool. Nancy & Mary was subsequently repaired.
Norval	United Kingdom	The ship was driven ashore in Sinclair's Bay, Caithness. She was on a voyage from Aberdeen to an American port.
Oris	United Kingdom	The ship was driven ashore and wrecked at Sandy Hook, New Jersey, United States. Her crew were rescued. She was on a voyage from Dublin to New York, United States.
Raikes	United Kingdom	The ship ran aground at "Cape Tear". She was on a voyage from Wilmington, Delaware, United States to Liverpool. She was refloated and put in to Charleston, South Carolina, United States in a leaky condition.
Trader	United Kingdom	The ship ran aground on the Little Bahama Bank. She was on a voyage from Jamaica to Greenock, Renfrewshire. She was refloated.
Two Brothers	United Kingdom	The ship was wrecked on the Little Bahama Bank. She was on a voyage from New Orleans, Louisiana, to Liverpool.
Unnamed	Lübeck	The ship foundered with the loss of three of her crew. Survivors were rescued by Lady Palk (United Kingdom). She was on a voyage from Hamburg to Liverpool.

== May ==
=== 1 May ===
List of shipwrecks: 1 May 1818
Ship	State	Description
Augusta Henrietta	Danzig	The ship was driven ashore and damaged on Shapinsay, Orkney Islands, United Kingdom. She was on a voyage from Danzig to Liverpool, Lancashire, United Kingdom. Augusta Henrietta was later refloated.
Louisa	United States	The ship was wrecked in the River Plate.
Unity	United Kingdom	The ship foundered in the North Sea off the coast of Lincolnshire with the loss of all hands.

=== 3 May ===
List of shipwrecks: 3 May 1818
Ship	State	Description
Atlas	United States	The ship was driven ashore and damaged near Belém Tower, Lisbon, Portugal. She was later refloated.
Bittern	United Kingdom	The ship ran aground on the Point Pleasant Shoal, off Halifax, Nova Scotia, British North America. She was on a voyage from Newcastle upon Tyne, Northumberland to Halifax. She was refloated the next day and taken in to Halifax.
Twee Gebroeders	Duchy of Holstein	The ship was run down and sunk in the Thames Estuary off Leigh-on-Sea, Essex, United Kingdom by the hoy Grand Falconer (United Kingdom). Twee Gebroeders was on a voyage from Tönningen to London, United Kingdom.

=== 4 May ===
List of shipwrecks: 4 May 1818
Ship	State	Description
Altaveda	Portugal	The schooner exploded and sank in the Atlantic Ocean off the coast of Virginia, United States with the loss of 23 of her crew.
Hartford	United Kingdom	The ship was destroyed by fire at Newcastle upon Tyne, Northumberland.
Ida	Prussia	The ship was driven ashore on Dragør, Denmark. She was on a voyage from Swinemünde to London, United Kingdom. Ida was later refloated and put into Copenhagen, Denmark for repairs.
Susanna	United Kingdom	The ship struck ice in the Gulf of Saint Lawrence and foundered. Her crew were rescued. She was on a voyage from London to Miramichi Bay.
Triton	United Kingdom	The ship was driven ashore near Figueira da Foz, Portugal. She was on a voyage from Georgetown and Alexandria to Figueira da Foz.

=== 5 May ===
List of shipwrecks: 5 May 1818
Ship	State	Description
Catherine Griffith	United Kingdom	The ship was run aground at Dungeness, Kent. She was on a voyage from London to Valparaíso, Chile.
Favourite	United Kingdom	The ship was wrecked north of Sandhamn, Sweden. Her crew were rescued. She was on a voyage from Danzig to Kirkwall, Orkney Islands.
Fortuna	Denmark	The ship was wrecked at St Abb's Head, Berwickshire, United Kingdom. She was on a voyage from Aalborg to Leith, Lothian, United Kingdom.
Liverpool Packet	United Kingdom	The ship was driven ashore and severely damaged near Land's End, Cornwall. She was on a voyage from Liverpool, Lancashire, to Harwich, Essex. Liverpool Packet floated off on 7 May and was taken in to Penzance, Cornwall in a waterlogged condition.
Vermont	United States	The ship was driven ashore in the Swine Bottoms, in the Baltic Sea. She was on a voyage from Lisbon, Portugal to a Baltic port.

=== 10 May ===
List of shipwrecks: 10 May 1818
Ship	State	Description
John	United Kingdom	The ship was in collision with Thomas Gibbons (United States) and foundered in the Atlantic Ocean (45°00′N 38°12′W). Her crew were rescued. She was on a voyage from Liverpool, Lancashire, to Quebec City, Lower Canada, British North America.

=== 13 May ===
List of shipwrecks: 13 May 1818
Ship	State	Description
Nancy and Mary	United Kingdom	The ship was wrecked in Whitsand Bay. Her crew were rescued. She was on a voyage from Fowey, Cornwall, to Swansea, Glamorgan.
Richard & Jane	United Kingdom	The ship was driven ashore in Bigbury Bay. she was on a voyage from Exmouth to Plymouth, Devon.
Somerset	United Kingdom	The ship foundered in the English Channel off the Isle of Wight. Her crew were rescued. She was on a voyage from Jersey, Channel Islands to Rochester, Kent.

=== 15 May ===
List of shipwrecks: 15 May 1818
Ship	State	Description
Blue-Eyed Maid	United Kingdom	The ship was driven ashore near Shoreham-by-Sea, Sussex. She was on a voyage from London to Poole, Dorset.
Duke of Clarence	United Kingdom	The ship departed from the Île de Noirmoutier, Vendée, France for Falmouth, Cornwall. No further trace, presumed foundered with the loss of all hands.
William Carlton	United States	The full-rigged ship was wrecked at Kill Devil Hills, North Carolina.

=== 16 May ===
List of shipwrecks: 16 May 1818
Ship	State	Description
Eberhardina	Prussia	The ship was wrecked on the Falster Reef, in the Baltic Sea. She was on a voyage from Königsberg to Amsterdam, North Holland, Netherlands.
Hanover	(United Kingdom of Great Britain and Ireland) Jamaica	The sloop was wrecked on a reef off Yallahs with the loss of three of her seven crew.

=== 17 May ===
List of shipwrecks: 17 May 1818
Ship	State	Description
Barbadoes	United Kingdom	The ship was driven ashore at Demerara.
Cæsar	United Kingdom	The ship was wrecked on a reef off Bermuda. She was on a voyage from Newcastle upon Tyne, Northumberland to Baltimore, Maryland, United States.
Carin	Sweden	The ship ran aground off Landsort. She was on a voyage from Amsterdam, North Holland, Netherlands to Stockholm.
Redligheten	Sweden	The ship ran aground off Helsingborg. She was on a voyage from Cagliari, Kingdom of Sardinia to "Sundwell".
Vesta	Hamburg	The ship ran aground on the Goodwin Sands, Kent, United Kingdom. She was on a voyage from Hamburg to St. Thomas, Virgin Islands. She was refloated with assistance and taken in to The Downs.

=== 18 May ===
List of shipwrecks: 18 May 1818
Ship	State	Description
Bonetta	Grand Duchy of Tuscany	The ship was driven ashore on Paolo Island. She was on a voyage from Livorno to liverpool, Lancashire, United Kingdom. Bonetta was later refloated and taken in to Cagliari, Sardinia, where she was condemned.
Chilham Castle	United Kingdom	The ship was wrecked on Anegada. Her crew were rescued. She was on a voyage from Liverpool, Lancashire, to Campeche. Mexico.
Jane	United Kingdom	The ship was driven ashore and wrecked at the Cape of Good Hope. Her crew were rescued.
Rambler	United Kingdom	The ship was driven ashore and wrecked at the Cape of Good Hope. Her crew were rescued.
Real	Portugal	Atlantic Slave Trade: The brig was driven ashore and wrecked at the Cape of Good Hope with the loss of twenty slaves. She was on a voyage from Mozambique to San Salvador.

=== 20 May ===
List of shipwrecks: 20 May 1818
Ship	State	Description
Richard and Jane	United Kingdom	The ship was driven ashore in Bigbury Bay. She was on a voyage from Exmouth to Plymouth, Devon.
Somerset	United Kingdom	The ship foundered in the English Channel off the Isle of Wight. Her crew were rescued. She was on a voyage from Jersey, Channel Islands to Rochester, Kent.

=== 22 May ===
List of shipwrecks: 22 May 1818
Ship	State	Description
Anna Sophia	Rostock	The ship ran aground on the Herd Sand, in the North Sea off the coast of County Durham, United Kingdom. She was on a voyage from North Shields, Northumberland to Rostock. Anna Sophia was later refloated and taken in to North Shields for repairs.
Henriette	Hamburg	The ship sprang a leak and capsized in the English Channel off Dungeness, Kent, United Kingdom. She was abandoned by her crew. Henriette was on a voyage from Málaga, Spain to Dover, Kent and Hamburg. She was subsequently towed in to Hastings, Sussex by Argus and Eagle (both United Kingdom).
Kelton	United Kingdom	The ship was driven ashore at Wilmington, Delaware, United States. She was refloated the next day,

=== 23 May ===
List of shipwrecks: 23 May 1818
Ship	State	Description
Ruth	United Kingdom	The ship was driven ashore at Wilmington. She was on a voyage from Wilmington to Liverpool, Lancashire.
Wheathill	United Kingdom	The ship sprang a leak in the North Sea whilst on a voyage from Sunderland, County Durham to Charmouth, Dorset. She put into Bridlington, Yorkshire, where she struck the pier and was damaged.

=== 25 May ===
List of shipwrecks: 25 May 1818
Ship	State	Description
Honor	United Kingdom	The ship was driven ashore near Faro, Portugal. She was on a voyage from Seville, Spain, to London. Honor was refloated the next day.

=== 27 May ===
List of shipwrecks: 27 May 1818
Ship	State	Description
William	United Kingdom	The ship was wrecked on Rebecca Point, Saint Vincent with the loss of one of her crew. She was on a voyage from Tobago to London.

=== 31 May ===
List of shipwrecks: 31 May 1818
Ship	State	Description
Vertrouwen	Netherlands	The ship sank near "Abs". Her crew were rescued. She was on a voyage from Amsterdam, North Holland to Hamburg.

=== Unknown date ===
List of shipwrecks: Unknown date in May 1818
Ship	State	Description
Bell and Susan	United Kingdom	The ship ran aground off the Mull of Kintyre, Argyllshire and was wrecked. She was on a voyage from Sligo to Liverpool, Lancashire.
Bello Corunes	Spain	Argentine War of Independence: The ship was captured by an insurgent privateer and was run ashore near Newport, Rhode Island, United States before 27 May. She was on a voyage from Tarragona to Veracruz, Viceroyalty of New Granada. Bello Corunes was later refloated and taken in to Newport.
Frederick	United Kingdom	The ship was wrecked at Cape Flinders, New Holland with the ultimate loss of 23 of her 28 crew. Survivors were rescued by Duke of Wellington (United Kingdom).
Gotha	Sweden	The ship was sunk by ice in the White Sea. She was on a voyage from Gothenburg to Arkhangelsk, Russia.
Jenny	United Kingdom	The ship was driven ashore on Bornholm, Denmark. She was on a voyage from Memel, Prussia to London. Jenny was later refloated and taken in to "Rerme" (Rønne?) for repairs.
John	United Kingdom	The ship was wrecked on Cape Breton Island, Nova Scotia, British North America. There was one survivor. She was on a voyage from Leith, Lothian to Halifax, Nova Scotia.
Nancy	United Kingdom	The brig sprang a leak and was beached on the coast of Newfoundland, British North America. She was on a voyage from Newfoundland to Barbados.
Patterson	United States	The full-rigged ship was wrecked on Anegada, Virgin Islands on or before 18 April. She was on a voyage from Bordeaux, Gironde, France, to New Orleans, Louisiana.
Romeo	United Kingdom	The ship ran aground at Charleston, South Carolina, United States. She was on a voyage from Charlesto to Liverpool, Lancashire.
Unnamed	Flag unknown	The brig-of-war was wrecked on the Colorados in early May.
Unnamed	France	The whaler, a brig, was wrecked on the Barbary Coast south of Cape Non, Morocco in late May.

== June ==
=== 6 June ===
List of shipwrecks: 6 June 1818
Ship	State	Description
Diana	United Kingdom	The ship ran aground on the James & Mary's Sand, in the Hooghly River. She was on a voyage from Calcutta, India to London.

=== 10 June ===
List of shipwrecks: 10 June 1818
Ship	State	Description
Patty and Harriet	United States	The sloop capsized in the Hudson River off Fort Montgomery, New York during a squall with the loss of seven lives.
Recovery	United Kingdom	The ship was sunk by ice in the Gulf of Saint Lawrence off the Magdalen Islands. Her sixteen crew were rescued on 11 May by Middleton (United Kingdom). She was on a voyage from Hull to Miramichi Bay
HMS Tiber	Royal Navy	The Cydnus-class frigate ran aground off Black Rock, Sussex. She was refloated.

=== 14 June ===
List of shipwrecks: 14 June 1818
Ship	State	Description
Alexander	United Kingdom	The ship struck rocks in the Bay of Fundy and was wrecked. All on board were rescued by HMS Dee (Royal Navy). She was on a voyage from Londonderry to Saint John, New Brunswick, British North America.

=== 15 June ===
List of shipwrecks: 15 June 1818
Ship	State	Description
Concord	(United Kingdom of Great Britain and Ireland) Saint Vincent	The sloop was driven ashore and wrecked at Fort Charlotte, Saint Vincent.
Georgia	United States	The brig was driven ashore and wrecked in the Currituck Inlet. Her crew were rescued. She was on a voyage from New York to Darien, Georgia.
Unicorn	(United Kingdom of Great Britain and Ireland) Trinidad	The schooner was wrecked in the Bocas del Toro Archipelago. All on board were rescued.

=== 16 June ===
List of shipwrecks: 16 June 1818
Ship	State	Description
Sir Henry Mildmay	United Kingdom	The ship capsized at Carrières-sur-Seine, Yvelines, France. She was on a voyage from Charleston, Renfrewshire to Honfleur, Calvados and "Candebec", France.

=== 20 June ===
List of shipwrecks: 20 June 1818
Ship	State	Description
Supply	United Kingdom	The ship was driven ashore on the "Gillege". She was later refloated and put into Copenhagen, Denmark for repairs.

=== 22 June ===
List of shipwrecks: 22 June 1818
Ship	State	Description
Guadeloupe	Portugal	The brig was captured and sunk in the River Plate by Maipo (Argentina). She was on a voyage from Rio de Janeiro, Brazil to Buenos Aires, Argentina.
Hope	United Kingdom	The sloop was driven ashore and sank at Ramsgate, Kent. She was on a voyage from Bridport, Dorset to London. Hope was later refloated and taken in to Ramsgate.

=== 23 June ===
List of shipwrecks: 23 June 1818
Ship	State	Description
Ann	United Kingdom	The ship was driven ashore and wrecked at the mouth of the Salt River, Cape of Good Hope.

=== 25 June ===
List of shipwrecks: 25 June 1818
Ship	State	Description
Betty	United Kingdom	The ship foundered in the Irish Sea. Her crew were rescued. She was on a voyage from Bridgwater, Somerset to Belfast, County Antrim.
Unnamed	Kingdom of Hanover	The ship was wrecked on the Maze Flat with the loss of all on board.
Unnamed	United Kingdom	The ship foundered in the Firth of Forth with the loss of at least one life. She was on a voyage from Newhaven, Lothian to Burntisland, Fife.

=== 26 June ===
List of shipwrecks: 26 June 1818
Ship	State	Description
Clarissa and Eliza	United States	The schooner was struck by a waterspout in the Atlantic Ocean off Barnegat, New Jersey, and capsized. Her crew were rescued. She was on a voyage from Guadeloupe to New York.
Ryzende Zon	Russia	The ship foundered in the North Sea off Texel, North Holland, Netherlands. Her crew were rescued. She was on a voyage from Riga to London, United Kingdom.

=== 28 June ===
List of shipwrecks: 28 June 1818
Ship	State	Description
Liverpool	United Kingdom	The schooner was wrecked on a reef off Calliaqua, Saint Vincent.

=== 29 June ===
List of shipwrecks: 29 June 1818
Ship	State	Description
Emmeline	United States	The ship capsized in a squall and foundered whilst on a voyage from New Orleans, Louisiana, to Trinidad.
St. Johann	Norway	The ship struck a rock and sank off Rust Island, off Bodø. Her crew were rescued. She was on a voyage from London, United Kingdom to a Norwegian port.

=== 30 June ===
List of shipwrecks: 30 June 1818
Ship	State	Description
David Clark	United Kingdom	The ship was dismasted in a heavy gale in the China Sea. She arrived at Batavia on 2 September.

=== Unknown date ===
List of shipwrecks: Unknown date in June 1818
Ship	State	Description
General Kempt	United Kingdom	The ship was driven ashore on Saaremaa, Russia in mid-June. She was on a voyage from Liverpool, Lancashire, to Riga. General Kempt was later refloated and resumed her voyage.
Resource	United Kingdom	The ship was driven ashore near Dragør, Denmark. She was on a voyage from Danzig to an English port.
Rotterdam	Netherlands	The ship ran aground on the Worden Ledge, in the Netherlands East Indies and was wrecked. Her crew survived.
Triumph	Prussia	The ship was lost in the Dogger Bank. Her crew were rescued. She was on a voyage from Königsberg to London, United Kingdom.
Unnamed	Flag unknown	The ship was wrecked at Puerto de Vega, Spain in early June.

== July ==
=== 2 July ===
List of shipwrecks: 2 July 1818
Ship	State	Description
Albion	United Kingdom	The ship was driven ashore at Portsmouth, Hampshire. She floated off the next day.

=== 3 July ===
List of shipwrecks: 3 July 1818
Ship	State	Description
Three Brothers	United Kingdom	The Greenlandman was lost in the "North-East Bay", Davis Straits. Her crew were rescued.

=== 4 July ===
List of shipwrecks: 4 July 1818
Ship	State	Description
Joan	United Kingdom	The ship was wrecked on the Colorados, off the coast of Cuba. Her crew were rescued. She was on a voyage from Jamaica to Norfolk, Virginia, United States.

=== 5 July ===
List of shipwrecks: 5 July 1818
Ship	State	Description
Providence	United Kingdom	The ship ran aground in the River Tyne. She was refloated but consequently had to be beached for repairs.

=== 7 July ===
List of shipwrecks: 7 July 1818
Ship	State	Description
Cabalva	British East India Company	Cabalva. The East Indiaman was wrecked in the Mascarene Islands, in the Indian Ocean, with the loss her Captain and sixteen of her crew when her Longboat sank.
Naughton	United Kingdom	The ship was driven ashore in the Scheldt. She was on a voyage from Brielle, South Holland, United Kingdom to Peterhead, Aberdeenshire. She was refloated and put back to Brielle. Subsequently sailed to Rotterdam, South Holland for repairs.

=== 12 July ===
List of shipwrecks: 12 July 1818
Ship	State	Description
Mars	United Kingdom	The ship was wrecked on Fuerteventura, Canary Islands. She was on a voyage from the Canary Islands to London.

=== 14 July ===
List of shipwrecks: 14 July 1818
Ship	State	Description
Beauty	United Kingdom	The ship foundered off Martinique with the loss of at least 22 lives.

=== 15 July ===
List of shipwrecks: 15 July 1818
Ship	State	Description
Georgia	United Kingdom	The brig was driven ashore 10 nautical miles (19 km) south of the Currituck Inlet. Her crew were rescued. She was on a voyage from New York to Darien, Georgia, United States.

=== 17 July ===
List of shipwrecks: 17 July 1818
Ship	State	Description
Ant	United Kingdom	The ship ran aground on the Whitby Rock. She was on a voyage from south Shields, County Durham to Great Yarmouth, Norfolk. She was refloated.

=== 18 July ===
List of shipwrecks: 18 July 1818
Ship	State	Description
Sprightly	United Kingdom	The ship was wrecked on the coast of County Wexford. Her crew were rescued. She was on a voyage from Liverpool, Lancashire, to Kinsale, County Cork.

=== 20 July ===
List of shipwrecks: 20 July 1818
Ship	State	Description
Crisis	United States	The ship sprang a leak whilst on a voyage from Matanzas, Cuba to Antwerp, Netherlands. She put into Wilmington, Delaware, where she was driven ashore and wrecked on this date.

=== 22 July ===
List of shipwrecks: 22 July 1818
Ship	State	Description
Penrhyn	United Kingdom	The ship foundered off Cape Clear Island, County Cork. Her crew were rescued by Two Friends (United Kingdom). Penrhyn was on a voyage from Liverpool, Lancashire, to Newfoundland, British North America.

=== 23 July ===
List of shipwrecks: 23 July 1818
Ship	State	Description
Margaret	United Kingdom	The ship was wrecked on the West Hoyle Bank, in Liverpool Bay. She was on a voyage from Livorno, Grand Duchy of Tuscany to Liverpool, Lancashire.

=== 25 July ===
List of shipwrecks: 25 July 1818
Ship	State	Description
Georgia	United Kingdom	The brig was wrecked south of the Currituck Inlet. Her crew were rescued.

=== 26 July ===
List of shipwrecks: 26 July 1818
Ship	State	Description
John Winslow	United Kingdom	The ship was wrecked on the Main Reef, off "Cocoa Nut Keep". She was on a voyage from Liverpool, Lancashire, to British Honduras.

=== 27 July ===
List of shipwrecks: 27 July 1818
Ship	State	Description
Hope	United Kingdom	The ship ran aground in the Baltic Sea whilst on a voyage from Saint Petersburg, Russia to London. She was later refloated and put into Helsingør, Denmark for repairs, arriving on 6 August.

=== 30 July ===
List of shipwrecks: 30 July 1818
Ship	State	Description
Adriatic	United Kingdom	The ship was driven ashore at Flamborough Head, Yorkshire. She was on a voyage from Pillau, Prussia to London. She was refloated the next day and take in to Bridlington, Yorkshire.

=== Unknown date ===
List of shipwrecks: Unknown date in July 1818
Ship	State	Description
Ann	United Kingdom	The ship was driven ashore near Ballyhalbert, County Down. She was on a voyage from Glasgow, Renfrewshire to Cork.
Cicero	United States	The ship was wrecked in the Abaco Islands. Her crew were rescued. She was on a voyage from Boston, Massachusetts, to Havana, Cuba.
Frederic Emelie	Stettin	The ship was wrecked on the Norwegian coast. She was on a voyage from Stettin to London, United Kingdom.
Hannah	Denmark	The ship foundered in the North Sea with the loss of all but one of her crew. She was on a voyage from Odense to London.
Henry	United Kingdom	The ship was damaged by ice and abandoned in the Grand Banks of Newfoundland before 23 July. Her crew were rescued by an American brig. Henry was still afloate in a waterlogged condition on 31 July.
Johanna	Sweden	The ship was lost near Gothenburg. She was on a voyage from Gothenburg to Norden, Prussia.
Melantho	France	The ship was driven ashore on Götaland, Sweden. She was on a voyage from Saint Petersburg, Russia to Dunkerque, Nord. Melantho was later refloated.
Nostra Señora del Carno	Spain	The ship was captured by a Buenos Aires-based privateer. She was abandoned in the Atlantic Ocean in a sinking condition. Four of her crew were rescued.
Sally	United States	The ship departed from Oporto, Portugal for New York. No further trace, presumed foundered in the Atlantic Ocean with the loss of all hands.
Sarah	United Kingdom	The ship was driven ashore whilst on a voyage from "Holbeach" (Holbæk?) to Southampton, Hampshire. She was later refloated and put into Copenhagen, Denmark for repairs.
Union	United Kingdom	The ship foundered off the coast of Norway with the loss of all but three of her crew. She was on a voyage from Lübeck to London.
Vrouw Fenneckyn	Netherlands	The ship collided with a Danish ship and foundered. She was on a voyage from Groningen to London.

== August ==
=== 1 August ===
List of shipwrecks: 1 August 1818
Ship	State	Description
Friendship	India	The ship was wrecked on a reef south of Great Nicobar Island. Her crew were rescued.
Charles Sidney	United Kingdom	The ship capsized and was driven ashore at Sand's Point, New Jersey. She was on a voyage from New York to Oporto, Portugal.

=== 2 August ===
List of shipwrecks: 2 August 1818
Ship	State	Description
Edmund and Mary	United Kingdom	The ship was driven ashore and wrecked 6 nautical miles (11 km) from Dunkerque, Nord, France. Her crew were rescued. She was on a voyage from Newcastle upon Tyne, Northumberland to Dunkerque.

=== 4 August ===
List of shipwrecks: 4 August 1818
Ship	State	Description
Eliza	United Kingdom	The ship was wrecked on the Kentish Knock. She was on a voyage from Memel, Prussia to Bristol, Gloucestershire.

=== 5 August ===
List of shipwrecks: 5 August 1818
Ship	State	Description
Isabella	United Kingdom	The ship was driven ashore and damaged of Paterson's Rock, off Sanda Island, Inner Hebrides. She was on a voyage from Killala, County Cork to Great Cumbrae. Isabella was refloated the next day and taken in to Campbeltown, Argyllshire for repairs.
Nossa Senhora de Piedade	Portugal	The ship was captured, plundered and scuttled off Cape Prior, Spain, by an insurgent privateer. She was on a voyage from Lisbon to Bilbao, Spain.
Prince Edward	United Kingdom	The ship was run down and sunk in the Atlantic Ocean off Land's End, Cornwall, by Zephyr (United Kingdom). Her crew were rescued. Prince Edward was on a voyage from Plymouth, Devon to Prince Edward Island, British North America.
Tartar	United Kingdom	The ship was driven ashore and wrecked at Ostend, West Flanders, Netherlands. Her crew were rescued. She was on a voyage from Ostend to Colchester, Essex.
Zephyr	United Kingdom	The ship was wrecked in the Magdalen Islands, Nova Scotia, British North America. Her crew were rescued.

=== 6 August ===
List of shipwrecks: 6 August 1818
Ship	State	Description
Tamer, and Woodall	United Kingdom	The ships collided in the Irish Sea off the Isle of Man and foundered with the loss of four crew from Tamer.

=== 7 August ===
List of shipwrecks: 7 August 1818
Ship	State	Description
Alexander	(United Kingdom of Great Britain and Ireland) Jamaica	The schooner was wrecked on the "Silver Keys". Her crew survived.
Iris	United Kingdom	The ship was wrecked whilst on a voyage from Havana, Cuba, to the Cape Verde Islands, Portugal.
Queen	United Kingdom	The ship was wrecked on the Florida Reef. Her crew were rescued. She was on a voyage from Jamaica to London.

=== 8 August ===
List of shipwrecks: 8 August 1818
Ship	State	Description
Trader	United Kingdom	The ship departed from London for British Honduras. No further trace, presumed foundered with the loss of all hands.

=== 9 August ===
List of shipwrecks: 9 August 1818
Ship	State	Description
Margaret	United States	The ship was wrecked at Charleston, South Carolina. She was on a voyage from Charleston to Liverpool, Lancashire, United Kingdom.
Nelly	United Kingdom	The ship ran ashore at Kronstadt, Russia and was wrecked. She was on a voyage from London to Saint Petersburg, Russia.

=== 10 August ===
List of shipwrecks: 10 August 1818
Ship	State	Description
Solway	United Kingdom	The ship was wrecked on the Florida Reef. She was on a voyage from Jamaica to Whitehaven, Cumberland.
William	United Kingdom	The ship ran aground and was wrecked 5 nautical miles (9.3 km) north east of Cape Antonia, Cuba. She was on a voyage from Jamaica to the Clyde.

=== 11 August ===
List of shipwrecks: 11 August 1818
Ship	State	Description
Industry	United Kingdom	The ship was driven aground near Pillau, Prussia with the loss of two of her crew. She was on a voyage from Liverpool, Lancashire, to Pillau. She was deemed a total loss.

=== 13 August ===
List of shipwrecks: 13 August 1818
Ship	State	Description
Jessie	United Kingdom	The ship departed from Aberdeen for Pictou, Nova Scotia, British North America. No further trace, presumed foundered with the loss of all hands.

=== 14 August ===
List of shipwrecks: 14 August 1818
Ship	State	Description
Contest	United Kingdom	The ship departed from Gothenburg, Sweden for Newry, County Antrim. No further trace, presumed foundered with the loss of all hands.

=== 15 August ===
List of shipwrecks: 15 August 1818
Ship	State	Description
Emperor Alexander	United Kingdom	The ship ran aground on the Swine Bottoms, in the Baltic Sea. She was on a voyage from London to Saint Petersburg, Russia. She was refloated with the assistance of divers and put in to Landskrona, Sweden for repairs.
Sarah Ann	United Kingdom	The brigantine was driven ashore and damaged at Rattray Head, Aberdeenshire. She was on a voyage from Miramichi, New Brunswick, British North America, to Grangemouth, Stirlingshire. Sarah Ann was refloated on 17 August and taken in to Aberdeen.

=== 16 August ===
List of shipwrecks: 16 August 1818
Ship	State	Description
Jane	United States	The ship was wrecked on Crooked Island, Bahamas. She was on a voyage from Savannah, Georgia, to Jamaica.

=== 19 August ===
List of shipwrecks: 19 August 1818
Ship	State	Description
Ant	United Kingdom	The ship ran aground and was wrecked at Twelingate, Newfoundland, British North America.
Flavia	Netherlands	The ship was driven ashore and wrecked at Ostend, West Flanders. Her crew were rescued. She was on a voyage from Valencia and Cartagena, Spain, to Osted.

=== 20 August ===
List of shipwrecks: 20 August 1818
Ship	State	Description
Esperance	France	The ship foundered in the Strait of Gibraltar off Tarifa, Spain, with the loss of all but three of her crew. She was on a voyage from Brazil to Marseille, Bouches-du-Rhône.

=== 24 August ===
List of shipwrecks: 24 August 1818
Ship	State	Description
Lady Sherbrooke	(United Kingdom of Great Britain and Ireland) British North America	The schooner caught fire in the Waterford River, Newfoundland and was scuttled to extinguish the fire. One crew member died from smoke inhalation. She was later refloated, not seriously damaged.

=== 27 August ===
List of shipwrecks: 27 August 1818
Ship	State	Description
Goodintent	United Kingdom	The ship was driven ashore at Gothenburg, Sweden. She was later refloated and put into Gothenburg for repairs.

=== 28 August ===
List of shipwrecks: 28 August 1818
Ship	State	Description
Alexander Maxwell	United Kingdom	The ship was driven ashore and damaged at Cádiz, Spain. She was on a voyage from Liverpool, Lancashire, to Malta and Messina, Sicily
Insolente	Malta	The ship was driven ashore and wrecked at Cádiz.
Hugh	United Kingdom	The ship was driven ashore in Lagan Bay, Islay. She was on a voyage from Belfast, County Antrim to New Brunswick, British North America.
Jason	United Kingdom	The ship capsized off South Shields, County Durham. She was subsequently righted and beached.
Kitty	United Kingdom	The ship was driven ashore at Cádiz.
Nuevo Filipino	Spain	The brig was driven ashore and wrecked at Cádiz.
Samuel	(United Kingdom of Great Britain and Ireland) Guernsey	The ship was driven ashore at Cádiz.
San Joze	Spain	The brig was driven ashore and wrecked at Cádiz.

=== 29 August ===
List of shipwrecks: 29 August 1818
Ship	State	Description
Isabella	United Kingdom	The ship foundered in the Atlantic Ocean (26°30′N 62°50′W) during a hurricane with the loss of five of her crew. Survivors were rescued on 4 September by Carolina (Denmark). Isabella was on a voyage from Grenada to London.
Sally	United States	The ship capsized during a hurricane whilst on a voyage from Philadelphia to St. Barthélemy. Her crew were rescued on 2 September.

=== 30 August ===
List of shipwrecks: 30 August 1818
Ship	State	Description
Bear All	United Kingdom	The schooner was sunk in a hurricane at Bermuda.
Diamond	United Kingdom	The brig was severely damaged in a hurricane at Bermuda.
Frances & Elizabeth	United Kingdom	The schooner was driven ashore in a hurricane at Bermuda.
Hannah	United Kingdom	The brig was driven ashore in a hurricane at Bermuda.
Hope	(United States) Missouri Territory	The ship was wrecked at Bermuda.
Jane	United Kingdom	The schooner was driven ashore in a hurricane at Bermuda.
Liverpool	United Kingdom	The ship was severely damaged in a hurricane at Bermuda.
Mary	United Kingdom	The full-rigged ship was damaged in a hurricane at Bermuda.
Patience	United Kingdom	The brig was driven ashore in a hurricane at Bermuda.
St. Andrew	United Kingdom	The full-rigged ship was driven ashore in a hurricane at Bermuda.
Unnamed	United States	The ship was wrecked in a hurricane at St. Georges, Bermuda.

=== 31 August ===
List of shipwrecks: 31 August 1818
Ship	State	Description
Mary	United Kingdom	The ship foundered in the Irish Sea between Carsethorn and Burrin Point, Dumfriesshire with the loss of one life. She was on a voyage from Workington, Cumberland to Dumfries.

=== Unknown date ===
List of shipwrecks: Unknown date in August 1818
Ship	State	Description
Alert	United Kingdom	The snow ran aground on the Knoll, in the North Sea off the coast of Essex. She was on a voyage from Newcastle upon Tyne, Northumberland to Maldon, Essex.
Alert	United Kingdom	The ship was driven ashore near Copenhagen, Denmark in late August. She was on a voyage from Peterhead, Aberdeenshire to Saint Petersburg, Russia. She was refloated and resumed her voyage.
Ann	United Kingdom	The ship was destroyed by fire Dagerort, Russia with the loss of two of her crew. She was on a voyage from London to Saint Petersburg, Russia. The fire was extinguished and she completed her voyage.
Ceres	United States	The ship foundered whilst on a voyage from New York to Bermuda.
Clio	United Kingdom	The ship was wrecked on Cross Island. Her crew were rescued. She was on a voyage from Arkhangelsk, Russia to Hull, Yorkshire.
Eliza	United Kingdom	The ship was lost on the Kentish Knock, in the North Sea off Margate, Kent. She was on a voyage from Memel, Prussia to Bristol, Gloucestershire.
Emanuel	Norway	The ship was lost at Swinemünde, Prussia before 7 August.
Express	United Kingdom	The ship was lost near "Bay, Labrador", British North America in early August.
Industry	United Kingdom	The ship was wrecked at Pillau, Prussia with the loss of all but two of her crew. She was on a voyage from Liverpool, Lancashire, to Pillau.
Latona	United States	The ship was wrecked in Sumana Bay. Her crew were rescued. She was on a voyage from London to New Orleans, Louisiana.
Navigator	United States	The ship was driven ashore. She was on a voyage from Jamaica to Norfolk, Virginia. She was refloated and completed her voyage, arriving on 29 August.
Stakesby	United Kingdom	The ship ran ashore on Saltholm, Denmark. She was on a voyage from London to Saint Petersburg, Russia. Stakesby was later refloated and resumed her voyage.
Virginia	United Kingdom	The schooner was dismasted in the Atlantic Ocean before 24 August and was abandoned by her crew. The wreck was discovered on 24 August by Hero (United Kingdom) and was set afire.
William Carlton	United States	The ship was driven ashore between Cape Henry, Virginia and Cape Hatteras, North Carolina, before 6 August. She was on a voyage from New York to Charleston, South Carolina.

== September ==
=== 1 September ===
List of shipwrecks: 1 September 1818
Ship	State	Description
Albatross	United States	The brig was wrecked whilst on a voyage from the Falkland Islands to Salem, Massachusetts, with the loss of six of her ten crew. Survivors were rescued on 3 September by Ruby (United Kingdom).

=== 2 September ===
List of shipwrecks: 2 September 1818
Ship	State	Description
Dash	United Kingdom	The brig was run down and sunk by Sine (United Kingdom) with the loss of three of her five crew. She was on a voyage from Bangor, Caernarvonshire to London.

=== 3 September ===
List of shipwrecks: 3 September 1818
Ship	State	Description
Elizabeth	United Kingdom	The ship was driven ashore at Exemouth, Devon. She was on a voyage from South Shields, County Durham to Topsham, Devon.
Sine	United Kingdom	The ship was wrecked on The Platters, off the coast of Anglesey with the loss of thirteen lives. She was on a voyage from Liverpool, Lancashire, to Boston, Massachusetts, United States. Survivors were rescued by Mary and Sally (United States).

=== 4 September ===
List of shipwrecks: 4 September 1818
Ship	State	Description
Regent	United Kingdom	The ship was driven ashore and wrecked on St. Anne Island with the loss of two of her crew. She was on a voyage from Pernambuco to Maranhão, Brazil.

=== 8 September ===
List of shipwrecks: 8 September 1818
Ship	State	Description
Alfred the Great	United Kingdom	The ship was driven onto rocks west of Bermuda and was wrecked. All on board were rescued. She was on a voyage from Montego Bay, Jamaica to London.
Queen	United Kingdom	The ship was driven ashore near Kronstadt, Sweden. She was on a voyage from London to Saint Petersburg, Russia. She was later refloated.
Union	United Kingdom	The ship was driven ashore and damaged at Blackwater, County Wexford. She was on a voyage from Bangor to Wexford. Union was later refloated and taken in to Wexford for repairs.

=== 9 September ===
List of shipwrecks: 9 September 1818
Ship	State	Description
Annabella	United Kingdom	The ship sprang a leak and foundered off the Point of Ardnamurchan, Inverness-shire. Her crew were rescued. She was on a voyage from Ballachulish, Inverness-shire to Inverness.
Favourite	United Kingdom	The ship foundered in the Baltic Sea off Karlskrona, Sweden. Her crew were rescued. She was on a voyage from Leith, Lothian to Saint Petersburgh, Russia.
John	United Kingdom	The ship foundered in the North Sea off St. Abb's Head, Berwickshire. She was on a voyage from Swansea, Glamorgan to Dunmore, Stirlingshire.
Montezuma	United States	The ship foundered in the Atlantic Ocean. Her crew were rescued. She was on a voyage from Baltimore, Maryland, to Aux Cayes, Haiti.
Spring	United Kingdom	The ship was wrecked on Udlingen Island, Sweden. Her crew were rescued. She was on a voyage from Whitby, Yorkshire to Saint Petersburg.

=== 10 September ===
List of shipwrecks: 10 September 1818
Ship	State	Description
Annabella	United Kingdom	The ship sprang a leak and sank off the Point of Ardnamurchan, Argyllshire. Her crew were rescued. She was on a voyage from Ballachulish, Argyllshire to Inverness.
General Armstrong	United States	The ship, which had sprung a leak on 7 September, foundered in the Atlantic Ocean off Folly Island, South Carolina. All on board were rescued. She was on a voyage from Charleston, South Carolina, to Havana, Cuba.
Helen	United Kingdom	The ship foundered in the Atlantic Ocean off Seal Island, Nova Scotia, British North America. Her crew were rescued. She was on a voyage from Aberdeen to Saint John, New Brunswick, British North America.

=== 11 September ===
List of shipwrecks: 11 September 1818
Ship	State	Description
Betsey	United Kingdom	The ship sank at Bristol, Gloucestershire. She was on a voyage from Waterford to Bristol. Betsey was refloated the next day.
Jane	United Kingdom	The ship foundered in the North Sea off Saltfleet, Lincolnshire but was later refloated and beached at Saltfleet. She was on a voyage from Dordrecht, South Holland, Netherlands to Hull, Yorkshire.
Jonge Fraw Catharina	Norway	The ship was driven ashore on Eday, Orkney Islands, United Kingdom. She was on a voyage from Christiansand to Londonderry, United Kingdom.

=== 12 September ===
List of shipwrecks: 12 September 1818
Ship	State	Description
James	United Kingdom	The ship was run down and sunk in the English Channel. Her crew were rescued. She was on a voyage from Southampton, Hampshire to South Shields, County Durham.

=== 13 September ===
List of shipwrecks: 13 September 1818
Ship	State	Description
Catherine	United Kingdom	The ship departed Antwerp, Netherlands for London. No further trace, presumed foundered in the North Sea with the loss of all hands.
Sir John Doyle	(United Kingdom of Great Britain and Ireland) Guernsey	The ship was wrecked in the Abaco Islands. She was on a voyage from Havana to St. Jago de Cuba, Cuba.

=== 14 September ===
List of shipwrecks: 14 September 1818
Ship	State	Description
Chance	United Kingdom	The ship was wrecked in the River Plate. She was on a voyage from London to Buenos Aires, Argentina.
Regent	United Kingdom	The ship was wrecked off "St. Anna Island" with the loss of two of her crew. She was on a voyage from Rio de Janeiro, Pernambuco and Maranhão, Brazil to London.

=== 15 September ===
List of shipwrecks: 15 September 1818
Ship	State	Description
Dispatch	United Kingdom	The ship foundered in Quiberon Bay with the loss of all hands. She was on a voyage from Bordeaux, Gironde to London.
Jane Montgomery	United Kingdom	The ship was drinen ashore and wrecked ion Scatterie Island, Nova Scotia, British North America. Her crew were rescued. She was on a voyage from Greenock, Renfrewshire to Pictou, Nova Scotia.
Resolution	United Kingdom	The ship ran aground on the Whiting Sand, in the North Sea off the coast of Essex. She was on a voyage from Antwerp, Netherlands to London. She was refloated with assistance and taken in to Harwich, Essex.
Rothiemurchos	United Kingdom	The ship was driven ashore on Gotland, Sweden. She was on a voyage from Leith, Lothian to Saint Petersburg, Russia.

=== 16 September ===
List of shipwrecks: 16 September 1818
Ship	State	Description
Hippolyte	France	The ship was driven ashore on the "Île Duronchet". She was on a voyage from Cette, Hérault to Nantes, Loire-Inférieure.
William	United Kingdom	The brig was wrecked in the Jardines del Rey, Cuba. Her crew were rescued. She was on a voyage from Jamaica to London.

== 17 September ==
List of shipwrecks: 17 September 1818
Ship	State	Description
Courier	United Kingdom	The ship ran aground at Tarifa, Spain. She was on a voyage from Havana, Cuba to Málaga, Spain. She was refloated, and put in to Gibraltar the next day in a severely leaky condition.
Moira	United Kingdom	The ship was driven ashore and damaged at Málaga. She was on a voyage from Málaga to London. Moira was refloated the next day.

=== 18 September ===
List of shipwrecks: 18 September 1818
Ship	State	Description
Diligent	United Kingdom	The ship was wrecked on Goree Island, Zeeland, Netherlands. Her crew were rescued. She was on a voyage from Harlingen, Friesland, Netherlands to London.
Joseph and Jane	United Kingdom	The ship ran aground on the Shipwash Sand, in the North Sea off the coast of Suffolk. She was on a voyage from London to Saint Petersburg, Russia. She was refloated with the assistance of four smacks and taken in to Harwich, Essex.
Lapwing	United Kingdom	The ship was in collision with Ann (United Kingdom) in the North Sea off Southwold, Suffolk and foundered with the loss of all but two of her crew. Ann was towed in to Great Yarmouth, Norfolk in a severely damaged condition by Lord Cochrane (United Kingdom and a boat.
Neptune	United Kingdom	The brig was driven ashore and wrecked on the south coast of Grand Cayman Island. Her crew were rescued. She was on a voyage from Jamaica to "River St. Mary's".

=== 20 September ===
List of shipwrecks: 20 September 1818
Ship	State	Description
Montreal	(United Kingdom of Great Britain and Ireland) British North America	The ship was driven ashore and wrecked near Quebec City.
Old Friend of London	United Kingdom	The ship was wrecked in the Gambia River.
Wellington	United Kingdom	The ship was wrecked on the Domeness Reef. Her crew were rescued.

=== 21 September ===
List of shipwrecks: 21 September 1818
Ship	State	Description
Catharina	United Kingdom	The ship was driven ashore near Penzance, Cornwall. She was on a voyage from Dartmouth, Devon tp Bridgwater, Somerset.
Dragon	(United Kingdom of Great Britain and Ireland) Antigua	The ship was driven ashore in a hurricane at Antigua.
Frances	(United Kingdom of Great Britain and Ireland) Antigua	The ship was driven ashore in a hurricane at Antigua.
Iris	United Kingdom	The ship put in to Plymouth, Devon in a severely damaged condition. She was on a voyage from London to Bombay, India.
Jane	United Kingdom	The ship sprang a leak and foundered in the North Sea off North Foreland, Kent. Her crew were rescued. She was on a voyage from London to Ramsgate, Kent.
Lucy Ann	(United Kingdom of Great Britain and Ireland) Saint Kitts	The ship was driven ashore in a hurricane at Antigua.
Mackay	(United Kingdom of Great Britain and Ireland) Antigua	The ship was driven ashore in a hurricane at Antigua.
Maria	(United Kingdom of Great Britain and Ireland) Antigua	The ship was driven ashore in a hurricane at Antigua.
Matchless	(United Kingdom of Great Britain and Ireland) Antigua	The ship was driven ashore in a hurricane at Antigua.
Matthew	(United Kingdom of Great Britain and Ireland) Antigua	The ship was driven ashore in a hurricane at Antigua.
Nelson	(United Kingdom of Great Britain and Ireland) British North America	The ship was driven ashore in a hurricane at Antigua.
Neptune	(United Kingdom of Great Britain and Ireland) Tortola	The ship was driven ashore in a hurricane at Antigua.
Neptunus	Sweden	The ship foundered in the North Sea off Lindesnes, Norway. She was on a voyage from St. Ubes, Portugal to Norrköping.
Nonsuch	(United Kingdom of Great Britain and Ireland) Antigua	The ship was driven ashore in a hurricane at Antigua.
Providence	(United Kingdom of Great Britain and Ireland) Antigua	The ship was driven ashore in a hurricane at Antigua.
Sophia	United Kingdom	The ship was driven ashore in a hurricane at Antigua.
Staverton	United Kingdom	The ship was driven ashore near Penzance, Cornwall. She was on a voyage from Dartmouth, Devon to Bridgwater, Somerset. Staverton was later refloated and taken in to Penzance.
St. George	United Kingdom	The ship was driven ashore in a hurricane at Antigua.
Susan	(United Kingdom of Great Britain and Ireland) Antigua	The ship was driven ashore in a hurricane at Antigua.
Thetis	(United Kingdom of Great Britain and Ireland) Antigua	The ship was driven ashore in a hurricane at Antigua.
Thistle	(United Kingdom of Great Britain and Ireland) Antigua	The ship was driven ashore in a hurricane at Antigua.
Trader	(United Kingdom of Great Britain and Ireland) Antigua	The ship was driven ashore in a hurricane at Antigua.
Two Brothers	(United Kingdom of Great Britain and Ireland) Antigua	The ship was driven ashore in a hurricane at Antigua.
Waterloo	(United Kingdom of Great Britain and Ireland) British North America	The ship was driven ashore in a hurricane at Antigua.
Union	(United Kingdom of Great Britain and Ireland) Antigua	The ship was driven ashore in a hurricane at Antigua.
Zephyr	(United Kingdom of Great Britain and Ireland) Antigua	The ship was driven ashore in a hurricane at Antigua.

=== 22 September ===
List of shipwrecks: 22 September 1818
Ship	State	Description
Gute Hoffnung	Netherlands	The ship ran aground. She was on a voyage from Antwerp to London, United Kingdom. She was refloated and put in to Vlissingen, Zeeland in a leaky condition.
Jong Hermanus	Netherlands	The ship foundered off Klintholm Havn, Denmark. She was on a voyage from Ventava, Courland Governorate to Delfshaven, South Holland.
Mermaid	United Kingdom	The ship ran aground. She was refloated and put in to Vlissingen in a leaky condition.
Perseverance	United Kingdom	The snow foundered in Loch Seaforth with the loss of all hands. She was on a voyage from Saint Petersburg, Russia, to Whitehaven, Cumberland.

=== 23 September ===
List of shipwrecks: 23 September 1818
Ship	State	Description
Admiral Keats	United Kingdom	The schooner departed from Labrador, British North America, for Genoa, Grand Duchy of Tuscany. No further trace, presumed foundered with the loss of all hands.
Hope	United Kingdom	The ship sprang a leak and was abandoned. Her crew were rescued. She was on a voyage from Liverpool, Lancashire, to a Baltic port.
Triumph	United Kingdom	The ship capsized and sank in the Atlantic Ocean off the Eddystone Lighthouse with the loss of all hands. She was on a voyage from Tarragona, Spain, to London.

=== 24 September ===
List of shipwrecks: 24 September 1818
Ship	State	Description
Mungo Park	United Kingdom	The ship was driven ashore and wrecked at Saint-Pierre, Martinique.
Nika	Prussia	The ship was wrecked near Lerwick, Shetland Islands, United Kingdom with the loss of thirteen of her crew. She was on a voyage from Memel to Cork, United Kingdom.
Triumph	United Kingdom	The ship foundered in the Atlantic Ocean off Polperro, Cornwall, with the loss of all hands. She was on a voyage from Falmouth, Cornwall, to London.

=== 25 September ===
List of shipwrecks: 25 September 1818
Ship	State	Description
Friendship	United Kingdom	The sloop was wrecked on the Goodwin Sands, Kent. Her crew were rescued. She was on a voyage from Sunderland, County Durham to Cowes, Isle of Wight.
Kate	United Kingdom	The snow was wrecked on North Ronaldsay, Orkney Islands with the loss of one of her eleven crew. She was on a voyage from Saint Petersburg, Russia to Bristol, Gloucestershire.
Rothiemurchus	United Kingdom	The ship was driven ashore and wrecked on Götaland, Sweden. Her crew were rescued.

=== 26 September ===
List of shipwrecks: 26 September 1818
Ship	State	Description
Eleanor	United Kingdom	The ship was wrecked on the Rassen Bank, in the North Sea off Vlissingen, Zeeland, Netherlands. Her crew were rescued. She was on a voyage from London to Ostend West Flanders and/or Antwerp, Netherlands.
Galen	United States	The ship was severely damaged by fire at Belize.
Pilgrim	United Kingdom	The ship ran aground on The Needles, Isle of Wight and was wrecked. She was on a voyage from Cork to Newhaven, Sussex.

=== 27 September ===
List of shipwrecks: 27 September 1818
Ship	State	Description
Brave	United Kingdom	The ship was driven ashore and wrecked on the south coast of Götaland, Sweden. She was on a voyage from Riga, Russia to London.
John	United Kingdom	The ship was wrecked on the Cross Sand, in the North Sea off Great Yarmouth, Norfolk. She was on a voyage from Oporto, Portugal to Hull, Yorkshire.

=== 28 September ===
List of shipwrecks: 28 September 1818
Ship	State	Description
Barbara	United Kingdom	The ship ran aground on the Newcomb Sand, in the North Sea off the coast of Norfolk. She was on a voyage from South Shields, County Durham to London. She was refloated with assistance.
Catharine	United States	The ship foundered in the Atlantic Ocean. Her crew took to the long boat and were rescued eighteen days later. Catherine was on a voyage from Lisbon, Portugal to Philadelphia, Pennsylvania.
Enterprize	United Kingdom	The ship was wrecked on the Salthammer Reef, off Bornholm, Denmark. Her crew were rescued.
William	United States	The ship sprang a leak and was abandoned in the Atlantic Ocean (44°51′N 29°19′W). Her crew were rescued by Fame (United Kingdom). William was on a voyage from Philadelphia to Dublin, United Kingdom.

=== 29 September ===
List of shipwrecks: 29 September 1818
Ship	State	Description
Emily	United Kingdom	The ship foundered in Dublin Bay. Her crew were rescued. She was on a voyage from Liverpool, Lancashire, to Gibraltar.
Neptune	(United Kingdom of Great Britain and Ireland) Antigua	The ship was lost in the Turks Islands.
Unnamed	Flag unknown	The ship collided with the Elbe Lightship (Hamburg) and sank.

=== 30 September ===
List of shipwrecks: 30 September 1818
Ship	State	Description
Alert	United Kingdom	The ship sprang a leak and was beached at Brighton, Sussex, where she was wrecked. She was on a voyage from London to Brighton.
John	United Kingdom	The ship ran aground on the Cross Sand, in the North Sea. She was on a voyage from Oporto, Portugal to Hull, Yorkshire. She was refloated and beached at Great Yarmouth, Norfolk.

=== Unknown date ===
List of shipwrecks: Unknown date in September 1818
Ship	State	Description
Active	(United Kingdom of Great Britain and Ireland) Grenada	The sloop was presumed to have foundered with the loss of all hands whilst on a voyage from Norfolk, Virginia, United States to Grenada.
Ann	United Kingdom	The ship was driven ashore at Saint-Vallier, Quebec, British North America. She was on a voyage from Quebec City to Belfast, County Antrim. She was refloated and put back to Quebec City in a leaky condition.
Blucher	United Kingdom	The ship ran aground on the Swine Bottoms, in the Baltic Sea. She was on a voyage from Londo to Riga, Russia. She was refloated and taken in to Landskrona, Sweden for repairs.
Catharina	Stettin	The ship was driven ashore near Helsingborg, Sweden. She was on a voyage from Marseille, Bouches-du-Rhône, France to Stettin.
Concord	United Kingdom	The ship foundered in the Atlantic Ocean. All 30 people on board were rescued by Brisset (United Kingdom). Concord was on a voyage from Irvine, Ayrshire to New Brunswick, British North America.
Elizabeth	United Kingdom	The ship was driven ashore on Götaland, Sweden in late September. She was on a voyage from Saint Petersburg, Russia to Portsmouth, Hampshire. She was refloated before 17 October and taken in to "Liegara".
Frederick	(United Kingdom of Great Britain and Ireland) New South Wales	The ship was wrecked on a reef in the Torres Straits.
Gudgeon	United Kingdom	The schooner was wrecked off the Cayman Islands in mid-September. Her crew were rescued. She was on a voyage from Trinidad de Cuba, Cuba, to Jamaica.
Herman Gustav	Prussia	The ship was reported to have foundered before 23 September. She was on a voyage from London to Pillau and Königsberg.
Independence	United Kingdom	The ship ran aground at Stromness, Orkney Islands. She was on a voyage from Saint Petersburg to Liverpool, Lancashire. She was refloated and taken in to Stromness.
Junge Grethe	Stettin	The ship foundered in the Baltic Sea before 3 October. Her crew were rescued. She was on a voyage from Stettin to London, United Kingdom.
Le Santhola, or St. Ola	Norway	The brig foundered in the North Sea 10 leagues (30 nautical miles (56 km)) north east of Texel, North Holland, Netherlands. Her ten crew were rescued by a Dutch lugger. She was on a voyage from Dublin, United Kingdom to Norway.
Louisa Frederica	Norway	The ship was abandoned in late September whilst on a voyage from Trondheim to St. Martin's. She was later discover at sea by an Irish vessel and towed in to Trondheim.
Malta	United Kingdom	The ship departed from Dominica for London. No further trace, presumed foundered with the loss of all hands.
Margaret	United Kingdom	The ship capsized between 21 and 23 September. Her crew were rescued. She was on a voyage from New Brunswick, British North America, to Barbados.
Marquis Cornwallis	United Kingdom	The ship ran aground on the Swine Bottoms in the Baltic Sea. She was on a voyage from Dunkerque, Nord, France to Saint Petersburgh. She was refloated and taken in to the Øresund, where she arrived on 12 September.
Maria Isabella	Spanish Navy	The frigate was driven ashore and wrecked at Talcahuano, Chile. Her crew survived.
Patriot	Lübeck	The ship was driven ashore near Visby, Sweden. She was on a voyage from Lübeck to Saint Petersburg. Patriot was later refloated and taken in to "Burswick" for repairs.
Prince	United States	The ship was wrecked at Cape Fear, North Carolina in late September. She was on a voyage from Wilmington, Delaware, to Grenada. Prince was later refloated. She arrived at Grenada on 3 November.
Resolution	United Kingdom	The ship ran aground on the Whiting Sand, in the North Sea off the coast of Essex. She was on a voyage from Antwerp, Netherlands to London. She was refloated with the assistance of a salvage smack and taken in to Harwich, Essex.
Rosen	Norway	The ship foundered in the Bay of Biscay off La Rochelle, Charente-Inférieure, France with the loss of all but one of her crew. She was on a voyage from Bordeaux, Gironde, France, to Stettin.
Sandiford	United Kingdom	The ship was driven ashore at Lowestoft, Suffolk. She was later refloated and taken in to Great Yarmouth, where she sank.
Unity	United Kingdom	The ship was taken in to The Mumbles in a sinking condition. She was on a voyage from Sydney to Drogheda, County Louth.
Unnamed	United Kingdom	The sloop capsized in the Humber. Her crew were rescued.

== October ==
=== 1 October ===
List of shipwrecks: 1 October 1818
Ship	State	Description
Britannia	United Kingdom	The ship ran aground on the Brake Sand, in the North Sea off the coast of Kent and was damaged. She was on a voyage from Memel, Prussia to Portsmouth, Hampshire. She was refloated and resumed her voyage.

=== 2 October ===
List of shipwrecks: 2 October 1818
Ship	State	Description
Alonzo	United States	The ship foundered in the Atlantic Ocean off Cape Hatteras, North Carolina. Her crew were rescued. She was on a voyage from Grand Cayman Island to New York.
Herstelling	Netherlands	The ship departed from Surinam for Amsterdam, North Holland. No further trace, presumed foundered with the loss of all hands.
Jenny	United Kingdom	The ship was driven ashore and wrecked near Brighton, Sussex.

=== 3 October ===
List of shipwrecks: 3 October 1818
Ship	State	Description
Horatio	(United Kingdom of Great Britain and Ireland) Bermuda	The sloop was wrecked at Cape Hatteras, North Carolina, United States.
Jane	United Kingdom	The ship was driven ashore near South Shields, County Durham and sank. Her crew were rescued by the South Shields Lifeboat. She was later refloated and taken in to South Shields.
Vrow Gesina	Hamburg	The ship was driven ashore and wrecked on Heligoland. She was on a voyage from Lisbon, Portugal to Hamburg.

=== 4 October ===
List of shipwrecks: 4 October 1818
Ship	State	Description
Durham	United Kingdom	The ship was sighted off Cape Clear Island, County Cork, bound for Liverpool, Lancashire. No further trace, presumed foundered in the Irish Sea with the loss of all hands. She was on a voyage from Batavia, Netherlands East Indies to Liverpool.
Fame	United Kingdom	The ship was driven ashore at Cole Harbour, Nova Scotia, British North America. She was later refloated and taken in to Halifax, Nova Scotia, for repairs.

=== 5 October ===
List of shipwrecks: 5 October 1818
Ship	State	Description
Brilliant	United Kingdom	The ship departed from Constantinople, Ottoman Empire for Odessa, Russia. No further trace, presumed foundered with the loss of all hands.

=== 6 October ===
List of shipwrecks: 6 October 1818
Ship	State	Description
Helouise	France	The ship was driven ashore in the Brizzard Hole, "Bardowille". She was on a voyage from London, United Kingdom to Rouen, Seine-Inférieure.
Henrietta	United Kingdom	The ship departed from Arkhangelsk, Russia for London. No further trace, presumed foundered with the loss of all hands.
Ruby	United Kingdom	The ship foundered in Dundrum Bay. She was on a voyage from Liverpool, Lancashire, to Newry, County Antrim.

=== 7 October ===
List of shipwrecks: 7 October 1818
Ship	State	Description
Gudgeon	United Kingdom	The schooner was wrecked on the west coast of Grand Cayman Island. Her crew were rescued.

=== 9 October ===
List of shipwrecks: 9 October 1818
Ship	State	Description
Mary	United Kingdom	The ship ran aground on a wreck off Copenhagen, Denmark. She was on a voyage from Wisbech, Cambridgeshire to Saint Petersburg, Russia.
Sultan	United Kingdom	The ship foundered off Les Sables-d'Olonne, Vendée, France. She was on a voyage from Saint Domingo to Rotterdam, South Holland, Netherlands.

=== 10 October ===
List of shipwrecks: 10 October 1818
Ship	State	Description
Unnamed	Spain	The ship was captured and destroyed by the privateer Fortuna (Argentina). Her crew were rescued. She was on a voyage from Cádiz to Havana, Cuba.

=== 11 October ===
List of shipwrecks: 11 October 1818
Ship	State	Description
Christians Mindi	Norway	The schooner foundered in the Atlantic Ocean off Cape Wrath, Sutherland, United Kingdom. Her crew survived.
Mentor	United Kingdom	The ship departed from Liverpool, Lancashire, for Dublin. No further trace, presumed foundered in the Irish Sea with the loss of all hands.

=== 13 October ===
List of shipwrecks: 13 October 1818
Ship	State	Description
Kiliya (Килия)	Imperial Russian Navy	The brigantine was driven ashore and wrecked at Medea, Ottoman Empire. All 63 people on board were rescued. She was on a voyage from Sevastopol to Kertch.
Rowena	United Kingdom	The ship was driven ashore at Stromness, Orkney Islands. She was on a voyage from Pictou, Nova Scotia, British North America, to Aberdeen.
Unnamed	Austrian Empire	The three-masted ship was driven ashore and wrecked at Medea, Ottoman Empire, about 60 metres (200 ft) from Kiliya (see above). Only 5 of her 20 crew survived.

=== 14 October ===
List of shipwrecks: 14 October 1818
Ship	State	Description
Amelia	United Kingdom	The ship was dismasted in the Bahamas and was abandoned by her crew. She subsequently drove out to sea.
Brothers	United Kingdom	The ship sank in the Bahamas.
Conch	United Kingdom	The ship was driven ashore at Nassau, Bahamas.
Dash	United Kingdom	The ship was driven ashore and damaged at Nassau. She had been refloated b7 17 October.
Farmer	United Kingdom	The ship sank in the Bahamas.
Lavinia	United Kingdom	The ship was driven ashore and damaged at Nassau.
Margaret	United Kingdom	The ship was damaged in the Bahamas.
Midas	United Kingdom	The ship was driven ashore at Nassau. She had been refloated by 17 October.
Pam-be-civil	United Kingdom	The ship was driven ashore and wrecked at Nassau.
Perseverance	United Kingdom	The ship was driven ashore at Nassau.
Sarah	United Kingdom	The ship was driven ashore at Nassau.
Savannah Packet	United States	The ship was wrecked in the Abaco Islands. All on board were rescued. She was on a voyage from New York to Mobile, Alabama Territory.
Sir John Cameron	United Kingdom	The brig ran aground at Cooleentra, County Waterford. Her crew were rescued. She was on a voyage from Quebec, British North America, to Liverpool, Lancashire. She was refloated on 1 November and taken in to Waterford.
Sisters	United Kingdom	The ship was driven ashore and damaged at Nassau. She had been refloated by 17 October.
Speculation	United Kingdom	The ship was driven ashore and damaged at Nassau. She had been refloated by 17 October.
Swift	United Kingdom	The ship was driven ashore and damaged at Nassau. She had been refloated by 17 October.

=== 16 October ===
List of shipwrecks: 16 October 1818
Ship	State	Description
Harford	United Kingdom	The ship was wrecked on Hogland, Russia. Her crew were rescued. She was on a voyage from London to Memel, Prussia.
Hawk	United Kingdom	The ship departed from Madeira for Newfoundland, British North America. No further trace, presumed foundered with the loss of all hands.
Isabella	United Kingdom	The ship ran aground on the Lapsand, in the Baltic Sea off the coast of Denmark. She was on a voyage from Saint Petersburg, Russia to South Shields, County Durham.
Neptune	United Kingdom	The brig was driven ashore and wrecked at St. Shott's, Newfoundland. Her crew were rescued. She was on a voyage from Quebec, British North America, to Dublin.

=== 17 October ===
List of shipwrecks: 17 October 1818
Ship	State	Description
Jane	United Kingdom	The ship was driven ashore at Helsingør, Denmark. She was on a voyage from London to Saint Petersburg, Russia. Jane was later refloated and resumed her voyage.
Vestal	United Kingdom	The ship was wrecked on Læsø, Denmark October 17. She was on a voyage from Newcastle upon Tyne, Northumberland to Copenhagen, Denmark.
William	United Kingdom	The brig ran aground on The Manacles and was severely damaged. She was on a voyage from London to Belfast, County Antrim.

=== 18 October ===
List of shipwrecks: 18 October 1818
Ship	State	Description
Joseph	United Kingdom	The ship departed from Essequibo, British Guiana for London. No further trace, presumed foundered with the loss of all hands.
Rival	(flag) United States	The ship was wrecked in the Abaco Islands. All on board were rescued. She was on a voyage from Boston, Massachusetts to Mobile, Alabama.
Santa Christo du Grau	Spain	Argentine War of Independence: The ship was captured and sunk off Cape Trafalgar by an insurgent privateer. She was on a voyage from the Canary Islands to Cádiz.

=== 19 October ===
List of shipwrecks: 19 October 1818
Ship	State	Description
Lady Mount Stewart	United Kingdom	The ship was driven ashore and wrecked near Campbeltown, Argyllshire.
Union	United Kingdom	The ship was driven ashore and damaged at Tynemouth Castle, County Durham. Having been sold, she was refloated and taken in to Tynemouth for repairs.

=== 20 October ===
List of shipwrecks: 20 October 1818
Ship	State	Description
Falk (Фалк)	Imperial Russian Navy	The brig was holed by her anchor and was beached at the ru:Tolbukhin Lighthouse. Sitting deep due to the leak, she got stuck too far from the shore and only 2 of the 43 people on board survived the overnight wait for the rescue. She was on a voyage from Kronstadt to Sveaborg, Grand Duchy of Finland.
Nancy	United Kingdom	The ship was abandoned in the Atlantic Ocean (47°20′N 29°00′W). Her crew were rescued by Maria Tufton (United Kingdom). Nancy was on a voyage from Newcastle upon Tyne, Northumberland to Newfoundland, British North America.
Royal Charlotte	United Kingdom	The ship ran aground on the Stoney Binks, in the North Sea off the coast of Yorkire. She was on a voyage from Oporto, Portugal to Hull, Yorkshire. She was refloated on 23 October but was consequently beached at Spurn Point, Yorkshire.
Sutrauen	Prussia	The ship was wrecked on the Goodwin Sands, Kent, United Kingdom with the loss of all hands.

=== 21 October ===
List of shipwrecks: 21 October 1818
Ship	State	Description
Christoff	United Kingdom	The ship struck the Platters Rock, off Holyhead, Anglesey. She was on a voyage from Liverpool, Lancashire to Africa.
Venus	United Kingdom	The ship ran aground and capsized at Bristol, Gloucestershire. She was on a voyage from Bristol to Barbados. Venus was refloated the next day and taken back to Bristol.

=== 22 October ===
List of shipwrecks: 22 October 1818
Ship	State	Description
Anfield	United Kingdom	The ship was driven ashore on Terschelling, Friesland, Netherlands. Her crew survived. She was on a voyage from Danzig to Portsmouth, Hampshire.
Johanna Carsjens	Netherlands	The galiot was wrecked on the Goodwin Sands, Kent, United Kingdom.
John and Jane	United Kingdom	The ship ran aground off Dungarvan, County Waterford. She was on a voyage from Bristol, Gloucestershire to Waterford.

=== 23 October ===
List of shipwrecks: 23 October 1818
Ship	State	Description
Enfield	United Kingdom	The ship was wrecked on Terschelling, Friesland, Netherlands. Her crew were rescued. She was on a voyage from Danzig to Portsmouth, Hampshire.

=== 24 October ===
List of shipwrecks: 24 October 1818
Ship	State	Description
Cornwall	United Kingdom	The full-rigged ship was driven ashore and damaged south of Madras, India. She was later refloated, repaired and returned to service.
Fly	United Kingdom	The brig was driven ashore south of Madras.
Herring	United Kingdom	The ship ran aground at South Shields, County Durham. She was refloated and taken in to Newcastle upon Tyne, Northumberland in a leaky condition.
Industry	United Kingdom	The ship was abandoned in the Atlantic Ocean (49°00′N 9°41′W). Her crew were rescued by Chapman (United Kingdom). Industry was on a voyage from Dartmouth, Devon to Lisbon, Portugal.
Lady Castlereagh	United Kingdom	The full-rigged ship was driven ashore and wrecked south of Madras.
Lark	United Kingdom	The brig was driven ashore south of Madras.
Nika	Prussia	The ship was wrecked near Lerwick, Shetland Islands, United Kingdom with the loss of thirteen of her crew. She was on a voyage from Memel to Cork, United Kingdom.
Queen Charlotte	United Kingdom	The ship was wrecked at Madras with the loss of all hands.
Ruby	United Kingdom	The brig was driven ashore south of Madras.
Success	United Kingdom	The ship was wrecked at Madras.

=== 25 October ===
List of shipwrecks: 25 October 1818
Ship	State	Description
Charles	United Kingdom	The ship was wrecked at Tenerife, Canary Islands, Spain.
Royal Charlotte	United Kingdom	The ship ran aground on the Stoney Binks, in the North Sea off the mouth of the Humber. She was later refloated and beached at Spurn Point, Yorkshire. Royal Charlotte was on a voyage from Oporto, Portugal to Hull, Yorkshire.

=== 26 October ===
List of shipwrecks: 26 October 1818
Ship	State	Description
Chatsworth	United States	The brig ran aground on the Longsand, in the North Sea off the coast of Essex, United Kingdom. She was on a voyage from Bremen to Baltimore, Maryland. She was refloated.
Unnamed	Flag unknown	The ship ran aground on the Haisborough Sands, in the North Sea off the coast of Norfolk, United Kingdom. She was refloated with assistance.

=== 27 October ===
List of shipwrecks: 27 October 1818
Ship	State	Description
Venus	United Kingdom	The ship was driven ashore and wrecked at Villajoyosa, Spain.

=== 28 October ===
List of shipwrecks: 28 October 1818
Ship	State	Description
Frances Ann	United States	The ship foundered in the Gulf of Mexico off Cape Catoche. She was on a voyage from St. Thomas, Virgin Islands to Campeche, Mexico.
Mentor	United Kingdom	The ship ran aground and was severely damaged off the mouth of the River Tyne. She was on a voyage from Newcastle upon Tyne, Northumberland to London. Mentor was later refloated and taken in to Newcastle upon Tyne.

=== 29 October ===
List of shipwrecks: 29 October 1818
Ship	State	Description
Barbara	United Kingdom	The ship was driven ashore at Catalina, Newfoundland, British North America. Her crew were rescued. She was on a voyage from France to St. John's, Newfoundland.
General Lincoln	United States	The ship was abandoned in the Atlantic Ocean.
George III	Hamburg	The ship was driven ashore on the North Reef, off Düne, Heligoland. She was on a voyage from Lisbon, Portugal to Hamburg. George III was later refloated and arrived at Hamburg on 31 October.
Manique	United Kingdom	The ship was wrecked at Cape Rosier, Maine, United States. All on board were rescued by Emma (United Kingdom). Manique was on a voyage from Hull, Yorkshire to Quebec City, Lower Canada, British North America.
Sophia	United Kingdom	The ship was lost near Little Valley. She was on a voyage from Quebec City to Greenock, Renfrewshire.
Wellington	United Kingdom	The ship ran aground at Memel, Prussia and was consequently beached. Her crew were rescued. She was on a voyage from Liverpool, Lancashire, to Memel.

=== 30 October ===
List of shipwrecks: 30 October 1818
Ship	State	Description
Henry	United Kingdom	The ship was driven ashore at Partridge Island, Nova Scotia, British North America. She was on a voyage from New Brunswick, British North America to Jamaica. She was later refloated.

=== 31 October ===
List of shipwrecks: 31 October 1818
Ship	State	Description
Acorn	United Kingdom	The ship collided with Meanwell (United Kingdom) in the North Sea south of Spurn Point, Yorkshire and was severely damaged. Acorn subsequently put in to Yorkshire.
Britannia	United Kingdom	The ship was driven ashore at Southsea, Hampshire.
Catharina Louisa	Sweden	The ship was driven ashore on Gotland. She was on a voyage from Norrköping to Copenhagen, Denmark.
Sophia Magdalena	Sweden	The ship was wrecked on the south coast of Gotland. She was on a voyage from Stockholm to Copenhagen.

=== Unknown date ===
List of shipwrecks: Unknown date in October 1818
Ship	State	Description
Adamaster	Portugal	The ship foundered in the Mediterranean Sea. Her crew were rescued. She was on a voyage from Palermo, Sicily to Lisbon.
Ann	(United Kingdom of Great Britain and Ireland) British North America	The brig was abandoned in the Atlantic Ocean before 10 October.
Brothers	United Kingdom	The ship capsized and was abandoned in the Atlantic Ocean before 12 October. Her crew were rescued. She was on a voyage from New Brunswick, British North America, to Liverpool, Lancashire.
Charlotte	United Kingdom	The ship foundered in the Irish Sea off Great Orme, Caernarvonshire. Her crew were rescued. She was on a voyage from Liverpool to Newry, County Antrim.
Commerce	United Kingdom	The ship was lost whilst on a voyage from Colchester, Essex to Christiania, Norway.
Diana	Bremen	The ship struck an object near Borkum, Kingdom of Hanover and sprang a leak. She was on a voyage from Bremen to Bilbao, Spain. She put back to Bremen on 8 October.
Eliza	United States	The ship was wrecked on the Carysfort Reef. She was on a voyage from Jamaica to Philadelphia, Pennsylvania.
Frederick Adolph	Norway	The ship was wrecked on "Nargin Island". She was on a voyage from Norway to Saint Petersburg, Russia.
George	United Kingdom	The ship struck rocks in the Barju River before 12 October and was abandoned by her crew. She was on a voyage from Arkhangelsk, Russia, to London.
Goede Hensight	Norway	The ship foundered off Mandal with the loss of all but one of her crew. She was on a voyage from Danzig to Stavanger.
Industry	United Kingdom	The ship was wrecked whilst on a voyage from Bombay, India to Point de Galle, Ceylon. Her crew were rescued.
John	United Kingdom	The ship was wrecked on the Silver Keys on 10 or 12 October. Her crew were rescued.
Maria	Portugal	The ship was captured and sunk by an insurgent privateer. She was on a voyage from Madeira to Oporto.
Mariner	United Kingdom	The ship ran ashore on Saltholm, Denmark. She was on a voyage from Saint Petersburgto London. She was refloated and resumed her voyage, but subsequently put in to Scarborough, Yorkshire.
Mary	United Kingdom	The ship capsized off Bermuda in mid-October. She was on a voyage from Wilmington, Delaware, United States to Demerara.
Samuel Bradock	United Kingdom	The ship foundered in the Atlantic Ocean. Her crew were rescued by Amy (United Kingdom). Samuel Braddock was on a voyage from Liverpool to Quebec, British North America.
Skeppet Balloon	Sweden	The ship was driven ashore near Gijón, Spain. She was refloated on 10 October and taken.
Shakespeare	United States	The ship was lost near Shelburne, Nova Scotia, British North America. She was reported to be on a voyage from Portland, Maine, to Demerara.
Wellington	United Kingdom	The ship was wrecked near Riga, Russia. Her crew were rescued.
Whiting	United Kingdom	The ship was driven ashore on the coast of the Azoff Sea near "Terrapia", Russia.

== November ==
=== 1 November ===
List of shipwrecks: 1 November 1818
Ship	State	Description
Conquestador	Portugal	The ship was wrecked on the Arklow Banks, in the Irish Sea off the coast of County Wicklow, United Kingdom. She was on a voyage from St. Ubes to Dublin, United Kingdom.
Leith and Berwick Packet	United Kingdom	The sloop was sighted off Dunstanburgh Castle whilst bound for Leith, Lothian. Presumed subsequently run down and sunk with the loss of all hands.
Lion	United Kingdom	The ship departed from Saint John, New Brunswick, British North America, for Aberdeen. no further trace, presumed foundered with the loss of all hands.

=== 2 November ===
List of shipwrecks: 2 November 1818
Ship	State	Description
Britannia	United Kingdom	The brig was wrecked on Langeoog, Prussia. Her cargo was plundered by local fishermen.
Hoop	Netherlands	The ship was wrecked at Vatteville-la-Rue, Seine-Inférieure, France. She was on a voyage from Rouen, Seine-Inférieure to Antwerp and Brussels.

=== 3 November ===
List of shipwrecks: 3 November 1818
Ship	State	Description
Harriet	United Kingdom	The ship was abandoned in the Atlantic Ocean. Rebecca (United States), of Salem, rescued the crew. Harriet was on a voyage from Liverpool, Lancashire, to Saint John, New Brunswick, British North America.
Horatio	United Kingdom	The sloop was wrecked at Cape Hatteras, North Carolina, United States. Her crew were rescued.
Nancy	United Kingdom	The ship was wrecked in the Bay of Bulls. Her crew were rescued. She was on a voyage from Greenock, Renfrewshire to Newfoundland, British North America.

=== 4 November ===
List of shipwrecks: 4 November 1818
Ship	State	Description
Bee	United Kingdom	The ship was driven ashore on Tiree, Inner Hebrides. She was on a voyage from Glasgow, Renfrewshire to Letterkenny, County Donegal.

=== 5 November ===
List of shipwrecks: 5 November 1818
Ship	State	Description
Brilliant	United Kingdom	The ship departed from Constantinople, Ottoman Empire, for Odesa, Russia. No further trace, presumed foundered with the loss of all hands.
Eliza	United Kingdom	The ship foundered 12 nautical miles (22 km) west of Cape Chat, Lower Canada, British North America. Her crew survived. She was on a voyage from Plymouth, Devon to Quebec City, Lower Canada.
Wilhelmina	Flag unknown	The ship sank off Lisbon, Portugal. She was on a voyage from London, United Kingdom to Seville, Spain.

=== 6 November ===
List of shipwrecks: 6 November 1818
Ship	State	Description
Draper	United Kingdom	The ship was driven ashore and wrecked at Killala, County Mayo. She was on a voyage from St. Andrews, New Brunswick, British North America, to Sligo.
Jessy	United Kingdom	The ship was driven ashore and wrecked near Blyth, Northumberland. Her crew were rescued. She was on a voyage from Aberdeen to Sunderland, County Durham.
Lydia	United Kingdom	The ship foundered in the Grand Banks of Newfoundland. Her crew were rescued by Ellen (United Kingdom). She was on a voyage from Miramichi, New Brunswick, to Lancaster, Lancashire.
Peter	United Kingdom	The ship was driven ashore at Liverpool, Lancashire. She was on a voyage from Liverpool to Trieste.

=== 8 November ===
List of shipwrecks: 8 November 1818
Ship	State	Description
Lavinia	United Kingdom	The ship was abandoned in the Atlantic Ocean with the loss of two of her crew. Four survivors were rescued by Fanny (United Kingdom). Lavinia was on a voyage from Cádiz, Spain to Newfoundland, British North America.
Tay	United Kingdom	The ship sprang a leak in the Atlantic Ocean. She was abandoned on 10 November. Her crew were rescued by Elizabeth (Norway). Tay was on a voyage from Bowmore, Islay to Gibraltar.

=== 9 November ===
List of shipwrecks: 9 November 1818
Ship	State	Description
Caprieuse	France	The brig foundered in the Bay of Biscay off Port-Louis, Morbihan. She was on a voyage from Martinique to Nantes, Loire-Inférieure.
Harmony	(United Kingdom of Great Britain and Ireland) Trinidad	The brig was driven ashore near "Port Hobert". She was on a voyage from Trinidad to Saint John, New Brunswick, British North America.

=== 10 November ===
List of shipwrecks: 10 November 1818
Ship	State	Description
Friends	United Kingdom	The transport ship ran aground at Dover, Kent and was severely damaged in collisions with other vessels.
Gladwin	United Kingdom	The ship was wrecked at Beaumaris, Anglesey. She was on a voyage from Jamaica to Liverpool, Lancashire.
Margaret	United Kingdom	The ship was driven ashore and damageded at Youghall, County Cork. She was on a voyage from Liverpool to Cork. Margaret was refloated on 17 November and taken in to Youghall.
Marmion	United States	The ship ran aground on the Shipwash Sand, in the North Sea off the coast of Suffolk, United Kingdom. She was on a voyage from Hamburg to New Orleans, Louisiana. She was refloated and taken in to Harwich, Essex, United Kingdom.
Ocean	United Kingdom	The ship was driven ashore at Falmouth, Jamaica. Ocean was later refloated. She sailed for Green Island, Jamaica on 19 November.
Tay	United Kingdom	The ship, which had sprung a leak on 8 November, was abandoned in the Atlantic Ocean. Her crew were rescued by Elizabeth (Norway). She was on a voyage from Bowmore, Islay to Gibraltar.
Vrow Ida Alida	Netherlands	The ship was driven ashore and wrecked in False Bay, Africa. Her crew survived. She was on a voyage from Batavia to the Netherlands.

=== 11 November ===
List of shipwrecks: 11 November 1818
Ship	State	Description
Brunswick	United Kingdom	The ship was driven ashore at Kirkwall, Orkney Islands. She was on a voyage from Saint Petersburg, Russia to Whitehaven, Cumberland.
Duke of Wellington	(United Kingdom of Great Britain and Ireland) Bahamas	The ship was driven ashore and wrecked in Montego Bay, Jamaica.
Elrigg	United Kingdom	The ship was driven ashore and severely damaged at East Haven, Forfarshire. Her crew were rescued.
Good Intent	United Kingdom	The ship ran argound on the Platters, in the North Sea off the coast of Essex. She was on a voyage from London to Newcastle upon Tyne, Northumberland. She was refloated and put in to Harwich, Essex in a leaky condition.
Marshall	(United Kingdom of Great Britain and Ireland) British North America	The ship was driven ashore and wrecked at Savanna-la-Mar, Jamaica. She was consequently condemned.
Mary Ann	United Kingdom	The ship foundered in the Irish Sea off Barmouth, Merionethshire with the loss of seven lives. She was on a voyage from Bristol, Gloucestershire to Barmouth.
Nancy	United Kingdom	The brig was driven ashore and severely damaged at Sunderland, County Durham.
Perseverance	United Kingdom	The ship was lost near Kirkwall. Her crew were rescued. She was on a voyage from Riga, Russia, to Londonderry.
Prince of Orange	United Kingdom	The ship was lost on the coast of Cuba. She was on a voyage from Jamaica to Cuba.
Sylvan	United Kingdom	The ship was wrecked in the Sovereign Island, County Cork. She was on a voyage from Liverpool, Lancashire, to Cork.
Thames	United Kingdom	The ship was driven ashore at Savanna-la-Mar. She was later refloated.
William	United Kingdom	The brig was driven ashore and severely damaged at Sunderland, County Durham.
Unnamed	United Kingdom	The sloop foundered in the Boston Deeps, off the coast of Lincolnshire. Her crew were rescued. She was on a voyage from King's Lynn, Norfolk to York.

=== 12 November ===
List of shipwrecks: 12 November 1818
Ship	State	Description
Charlotte	United Kingdom	The ship was wrecked south of Madras, India in a cyclone with the loss of all hands.
Cornwall	United Kingdom	The ship was wrecked off Madras in a cyclone.
Dotterel	United Kingdom	The brig was wrecked south of Madras in a cyclone with the loss of all hands.
Elbing	Elbing	The ship was wrecked on the coast of Jutland. Her crew were rescued. She was on a voyage from Elbing to London, United Kingdom.
Fly	United Kingdom	The brig was wrecked south of Madras in a cyclone. Her crew were rescued.
Harriet	United Kingdom	The ship was wrecked off Madras in a cyclone.
Lady Castlereagh	United Kingdom	The ship was wrecked off Madras in a cyclone with the loss of six lives.
Lark	United Kingdom	The brig was wrecked south of Madras in a cyclone. Her crew were rescued.
Minerva	United Kingdom	The ship was driven ashore and damaged in Dundrum Bay. She was on a voyage from Liverpool, Lancashire, to Belfast, County Down. Minerva was later refloated.
Ruby	United Kingdom	The brig was wrecked south of Madras in a cyclone. Her crew were rescued.
Sarah	United Kingdom	The ship was driven ashore at Rio de Janeiro, United Kingdom of Portugal, Brazil and the Algarves. She was on a voyage from Liverpool, Lancashire to New York, United States.
Success	United Kingdom	The ship was wrecked north of Madras in a cyclone. Her crew were rescued.
Unnamed	Flag unknown	The ship was lost off Madras in a cyclone with the loss of all hands.

=== 13 November ===
List of shipwrecks: 13 November 1818
Ship	State	Description
Liberty	United States	The ship foundered in the Atlantic Ocean (24°46′N 46°25′W). Her crew were rescued. She was on a voyage from Cádiz, Spain to Baltimore, Maryland.
Two Sisters	United Kingdom	The ship was driven ashore and damaged at Brighton, Sussex. She was refloated and taken in to Littlehampton.

=== 14 November ===
List of shipwrecks: 14 November 1818
Ship	State	Description
Betsey	United Kingdom	The ship was wrecked near Boulogne, Pas-de-Calais, France with the loss of all hands. She was on a voyage from Youghall, County Cork to Southampton, Hampshire and London.
Richard & Ann	United Kingdom	The ship foundered in the English Channel off Dartmouth, Devon. Her crew were rescued. She was on a voyage from Penzance, Cornwall, to Portsmouth, Hampshire.
Royal Oak	(United Kingdom of Great Britain and Ireland) Jersey	The ship was lost at Grand Chine, Isle of Wight.

=== 15 November ===
List of shipwrecks: 15 November 1818
Ship	State	Description
Betsey	United Kingdom	The ship was driven ashore and wrecked at Étaples, Seine-Inférieure, France with the loss of all hands.
La Louise	France	The ship was driven ashore in the Seine at Quillebeuf-sur-Seine, Eure.
Vrow Annegina	Netherlands	The ship was run down and sunk in the North Sea off Sunderland, County Durham, United Kingdom by Nestor (United Kingdom). Her crew were rescued. Vrow Annegina was on a voyage from Sunderland to Groningen.

=== 16 November ===
List of shipwrecks: 16 November 1818
Ship	State	Description
Alexander	United Kingdom	The ship was driven ashore in the River Tyne. She was later refloated.
Cestus	United Kingdom	The ship ran aground and was severely damaged in the River Tyne. She was on a voyage from Newcastle upon Tyne, Northumberland to London. Cestus was later refloated and taken in to Newcastle upon Tyne for repairs.
Dovre	Norway	The ship was wrecked on North Ronaldsay, Orkney Islands, United Kingdom. Her crew were rescued. She was on a voyage from Christiansand to Belfast, County Antrim, United Kingdom.
Harp	United Kingdom	The ship was wrecked near Black Rock, Liverpool, Lancashire. Her crew were rescued. She was on a voyage from Labrador, British North America, to Liverpool.
Hewith	United Kingdom	The ship was driven ashore in the River Tyne. She was on a voyage from Newcastle upon Tyne to Jamaica. Hewith was later refloated.
Marie de Legire	France	The ship was lost whilst on a voyage from Pontrieux, Côtes-du-Nord to Bordeaux, Gironde.

=== 17 November ===
List of shipwrecks: 17 November 1818
Ship	State	Description
Colombia	United States	The brig struck rocks and was wrecked at Kennebunkport, Maine. All on board were rescued. She was on a voyage from Ponce, Puerto Rico, to Kennebunkport.
Delight	United Kingdom	The ship foundered in Liverpool Bay with the loss of all hands. She was on a voyage from Newry, County Antrim to Liverpool, Lancashire.
Emanuel	Denmark	The ship was driven ashore near "Roberknutt", Jutland. She was on a voyage from Bordeaux, Gironde, France, to Copenhagen.
Neptune	United Kingdom	The ship struck a rock near Whitby, Yorkshire and lost her rudder. She was on a voyage from Riga, Russia to Hull, Yorkshire. She put in to Whitby, where a temporary rudder was fitted. On departure, she struck the Whitby Rock, but continued her voyage.
Paix	France	The ship was driven ashore on the "Isle de Bouchey".
Peace	United Kingdom	The ship was driven ashore at "Udoer". She was on a voyage from Arkhangelsk, Russia to London. Peace was refloated the next day and put into Bergen, Norway, for repairs.

=== 18 November ===
List of shipwrecks: 18 November 1818
Ship	State	Description
Johanna Maria	Norway	The ship was wrecked near Uddevalla, Sweden. She was on a voyage from Leith, Lothian, United Kingdom to Dram.
Johannes	Lübeck	The ship was driven ashore near Steinberg, Duchy of Schleswig. She was on a voyage from London, United Kingdom to Lübeck.
Rival	United States	The ship was wrecked in the Abaco Islands. All on board were rescued. She wason a voyage from Savannah, Georgia, to Mobile, Alabama Territory.
Unique	United Kingdom	The ship was driven ashore at Westkapelle, West Flanders, Netherlands. Her crew were rescued. She was on a voyage from Hull, Yorkshire to Antwerp, Netherlands. Unique subsequently floated off and was later taken in to Veere, Zeeland, Netherlands.

=== 19 November ===
List of shipwrecks: 19 November 1818
Ship	State	Description
Adele	France	The ship was driven ashore near Val-de-la-Haye, Seine-Inférieure. She was on a voyage from Sicily to Caen, Calvados.
Simpson	United Kingdom	The ship was wrecked on Hila Point, Prussia. She was on a voyage from Danzig to Chatham, Kent.
Success	United Kingdom	The ship was lost on the Kentish Knock, in the North Sea. Her crew were rescued by a French vessel. She was on a voyage from South Shields, County Durham to Sandwich, Kent.

=== 20 November ===
List of shipwrecks: 20 November 1818
Ship	State	Description
Andrew Jackson	United States	The ship was wrecked on the Barnegat Shoals, in the Atlantic Ocean off the coast of New Jersey. All on board were rescued. She was on a voyage from Bristol, Gloucestershire, United Kingdom to New York.
Annisquan	United States	The ship was wrecked on the Isle of May, Fife, United Kingdom. Her crew were rescued.
Delight	United Kingdom	The sloop was driven ashore and wrecked at Stromness, Orkney Islands with the loss of all hands. She was on a voyage from Newry, County Antrim to Liverpool, Lancashire.
Marquis of Wellington	Portugal	The ship was driven ashore near Pará, Brazil. She was on a voyage from Pará to Lisbon.
Mary	United Kingdom	The ship ran aground on Neuwark. She was on a voyage from Sunderland, County Durham to Hamburg.
Penguin	United Kingdom	The ship departed from St. John's, Newfoundland, British North America, for A Coruña, Spain. No further trace, presumed foundered in the Atlantic Ocean with the loss of all hands.
Resource	United States	The ship departed from New York City on March 3, 1817, bound for the Pacific Ocean on a sealing voyage and on 20 November 1818, struck a submerged rock around 28° N. and 180° E. The ship took on water and sank. Some of her crew survived and spent 11 months on the island of Agrihan before being rescued by a brig bound for Manilla.
Samuel	United Kingdom	The ship was wrecked near New York, United States. She was on a voyage from Greenock, Renfrewshire to New York.

=== 23 November ===
List of shipwrecks: 23 November 1818
Ship	State	Description
John Palmer	(United Kingdom of Great Britain and Ireland) New South Wales	The schooner was wrecked at East Island, Tasmania with the loss of one life. Governor Sorrell ( (United Kingdom of Great Britain and Ireland) New South Wales) rescued the survivors.

=== 24 November ===
List of shipwrecks: 24 November 1818
Ship	State	Description
Aries	United Kingdom	The ship ran aground in the Atlantic Ocean (4°40′S 37°00′W). She was on a voyage from Liverpool, Lancashire to Rio de Janeiro, United Kingdom of Portugal, Brazil and the Algarves. She was refloated and found to be leaky.
Lord Wellington	United Kingdom	The brig was driven ashore at "Point Ebeneau", Ohio, United States. Her crew were rescued.

=== 25 November ===
List of shipwrecks: 25 November 1818
Ship	State	Description
Estrella	Portugal	The ship ran aground at Oporto. She was on a voyage from Oporto to Liverpool, Lancashire, United Kingdom. She was refloated and continued her voyage.
Simpson	Prussia	The ship was driven ashore and wrecked near Pillau. Her crew were rescued. She was on a voyage from Amsterdam, North Holland, Netherlands to Pillau.
Vigilantie	Netherlands	The ship foundered in the North Sea off Great Yarmouth, Norfolk, United Kingdom. She was on a voyage from Harlingen, Friesland to London, United Kingdom.

=== 26 November ===
List of shipwrecks: 26 November 1818
Ship	State	Description
Mercurius	Prussia	The ship was wrecked on Eierland, North Holland, Netherlands. She was on a voyage from Stralsund to Lisbon, Portugal.
Victoire	France	The lugger was lost in Bigbury Bay. Her crew were rescued.

=== 28 November ===
List of shipwrecks: 28 November 1818
Ship	State	Description
Albion	United Kingdom	The brig ran aground off Terschelling, Friesland, Netherlands. She was on a voyage from London to Bremen. Albion was refloated on 2 December and taken in to Terschelling.
Alexander	United Kingdom	The ship was driven ashore at Trusthorpe, Lincolnshire. She was on a voyage from London to Kincardine. Alexander was later refloated.
George	United Kingdom	The brig was severely damaged by fire at Pernambuco, Brazil.

=== 29 November ===
List of shipwrecks: 29 November 1818
Ship	State	Description
Caroline	Sweden	The ship was driven ashore in the River Plate at Buenos Aires, Argentina. She had been refloated by 17 December.
Hazard	France	The ship foundered whilst on a voyage from Bordeaux, Gironde to Saint-Valery-sur-Somme, Somme. Her crew were rescued.
Sadler or Salter	United Kingdom	The ship sank off Filey, North Riding of Yorkshire. She was refloated that day and taken in to Scarborough, Yorkshire in a severely damaged state.

=== 30 November ===
List of shipwrecks: 30 November 1818
Ship	State	Description
Eliza Ann	United Kingdom	The ship struck the quayside and sank at Liverpool, Lancashire. She was on a voyage from Saint John, New Brunswick, British North America, to Liverpool.
Fidelity	United Kingdom	The ship was driven ashore and severely damaged on the Spanish Battery Rocks, County Durham. She was later refloated and taken in to South Shields, County Durham.
Johanna Louisa	Denmark	The ship was wrecked in Wrango Sound. She was on a voyage from London, United Kingdom to Elsinore.
London	United Kingdom	The brig was run down and sunk in the Humber by Aline or Helena (Prussia) with the loss of five of her seven crew. London was on a voyage from Gainsborough, Lincolnshire to London.
Nostra Señora del Carmen	Spain	The ship was wrecked on Skagen, Denmark. She was on a voyage from Cádiz to a Russian port.
Sunton	United Kingdom	The brig was driven ashore on Skye and abandoned by her crew. She was subsequently destroyed by fire. Sunton was on a voyage from St. Andrews, New Brunswick, British North America, to Sligo.
Tiber	United Kingdom	The ship was driven ashore on the Spanish Battery Rocks. She was later refloated and taken in to South Shields.

=== Unknown date ===
List of shipwrecks: Unknown date in November 1818
Ship	State	Description
America	United States	The ship was wrecked on St. Nicholas Island before 15 November. She was on a voyage from Amsterdam, North Holland, Netherlands to Rio de Janeiro, Brazil.
Applecross	United Kingdom	The ship ran aground on the Oalsand, off the Norwegian coast in mid-November. She was on a voyage from Liverpool, Lancashire, to Gothenburg, Sweden.
Britannia	United Kingdom	The ship was driven ashore. She was on a voyage from London to Bremen. She was refloated and taken in to "Accumeziel", where she arrived on 5 November.
Caledonia	United Kingdom	The ship was wrecked at Falsterbø, Sweden before 14 November. Her crew were rescued. She was on a voyage from Danzig to London.
Charlotte	United Kingdom	The full-rigged ship foundered off the coast of Newfoundland, British North America.
Darlington	United Kingdom	The ship foundered in the North Sea in late November. She was on a voyage from Newcastle upon Tyne, Northumberland to Hull, Yorkshire.
Delime and Gerard	Bremen	The ship was holed by ice in the Weser. She was on a voyage from Bremen to London. She put back to Bremen for repairs.
Duke of Richmond	United Kingdom	The brig ran aground at Quebec City, Lower Canada, British North America, in early November. She was on a voyage from Quebec City to Greenock, Renfrewshire.
Eliza	United Kingdom	The ship was driven ashore at East Chile, Orkney Islands. She was on a voyage from Memel, Prussia to Londonderry. She was refloated in mid-February and taken in to Murckle Bay, Orkney Islands.
Forth	United Kingdom	The ship was driven ashore and wrecked on Møn, Denmark. She was on a voyage from Leith, Lothian to Stettin.
Gallant	United Kingdom	The ship was driven ashore near Portaferry, County Down. She was on a voyage from Liverpool to London.
Gleaner	(United Kingdom of Great Britain and Ireland) Guernsey	The ship was lost off the coast of Cuba before 5 November. Her crew were rescued. She was on a voyage from Guernsey to Havana, Cuba.
Goodintent	United States	The ship foundered whilst on a voyage from Haiti to Baltimore, Maryland.
Haabet	Flag unknown	The ship was driven ashore at the mouth of the Rhône. She was on a voyage from Barcelona, Spain, to Marseille, Bouches-du-Rhône, France.
Hans Somer Lorentzen	Norway	The ship struck a rock off Trondheim in late November and was abandoned by her crew.
Hebe	United Kingdom	The ship ran aground on the Jardines with the loss of six of her crew. She was on a voyage from Jamaica to London. Hebe was later refloated and taken in to St. Jago de Cuba, Cuba.
Hercules	United Kingdom	The ship was wrecked in the Saint Lawrence River in early November.
Hercules	United States	The ship foundered in Lake Michigan with the loss of all on board.
Hero	United Kingdom	The ship departed from Saint John, New Brunswick, British North America, for Dundee, Forfarshire. No further trace, presumed foundered with the loss of all hands.
Industry	United Kingdom	The ship ran aground on the Cable Grounds. She was refloated but was consequently beached near the "Point of Sturuden". Industry was on a voyage from Leith to Saint Petersburg, Russia.
Jonge Herman	Flag unknown	The ship was wrecked on Læsø, Denmark. She was on a voyage from St. Ubes, Portugal to Riga, Russia.
Mariner	United Kingdom	The ship was wrecked in the Colorados Archipelago, Cuba, before 16 November. Her crew were rescued. She was on a voyage from London to Havana, Cuba.
Marsouin	France	The ship was lost near La Teste-de-Buch, Gironde before 5 November. She was on a voyage from San Sebastián, Spain to Bordeaux, Gironde.
Mary and Betty	United Kingdom	The ship was lost on the Isle of Lewis, Outer Hebrides. She was on a voyage from Liverpool to Copenhagen, Denmark.
Nancy	United Kingdom	The ship was wrecked on the Haisborough Sands, in the North Sea off the coast of Norfolk. Her crew were rescued. She was on a voyage from Tönning, Duchy of Schleswig to London.
Orion	United Kingdom	The ship was wrecked in the Saint Lawrence River early in November.
Paquete do Porto	Portugal	Portuguese conquest of the Banda Oriental: The ship, which had been captured off Oporto on 6 September by one of Artigas's privateers, was driven ashore at Mount Desert, Maine, United States before 10 November. She had been on a voyage from Oporto to Rio de Janeiro, Brazil. She was subsequently restored to her owners.
Sarah	United Kingdom	The ship was driven ashore on at "Rio Nova", Jamaica in early November.
Sisters	United Kingdom	The ship was driven ashore on Saaremaa, Russia. She was on a voyage from London to Riga. Sisters was later refloated and arrived at Riga in mid-November.
Solicitude	Hamburg	The ship was wrecked on the Burlum Reef. She was on a voyage from Patras, Greece to Hamburg.
Towyn	United Kingdom	The ship was driven ashore at Red Wharf Bay, Anglesey. She was on a voyage from Belfast, County Down to Liverpool.
Volharding	Netherlands	The ship sprang a leak in the North Sea and was abandoned by her crew. She was on a voyage from Amsterdam to London. Volharding was later towed in to Texel, North Holland by Amstel (Netherlands).
Warren	United States	The ship was wrecked near Boston, Massachusetts. She was on a voyage from Bahia, Brazil, to Boston.
Unnamed	United Kingdom	The sloop ran aground in the Humber at Whitton, Lincolnshire and capsized. Her crew were rescued.

== December ==
=== 1 December ===
List of shipwrecks: 1 December 1818
Ship	State	Description
Frederick	Hamburg	The ship was wrecked on Baltrum, Kingdom of Hanover. Her crew were rescued. She was on a voyage from Oporto, Portugal to Hamburg.
Nelson	United Kingdom	The ship departed from Flint for Dublin. No further trace, presumed foundered in the Irish Sea with the loss of all hands.
Union	United Kingdom	The ship was in collision with a brig and foundered in the North Sea off Flamborough Head, Yorkshire with the loss of two of her crew.
Unnamed	United Kingdom	The fishing vessel struck a sunken wreck and foundered off Hendon, County Durham.

=== 2 December ===
List of shipwrecks: 2 December 1818
Ship	State	Description
Amanda	United Kingdom	The ship foundered in the Irish Sea 10 leagues (30 nautical miles (56 km)) south west of Bardsey Island, Pembrokeshire. Her crew were rescued. She was on a voyage from Youghal, County Cork to Liverpool, Lancashire.
Barbara & Ann	United Kingdom	The ship was driven ashore near Trusthorpe, Lincolnshire. She was on a voyage from Sunderland, County Durham to Plymouth, Devon. Barbara & Ann was later refloated.
Briton	United Kingdom	The ship was lost off Lindisfarne, Northumberland. Her crew were rescued. She was on a voyage from Aberdeen to London.
Commerce	United Kingdom	The brig was run down and sunk in the Irish Sea off the Tuskar Rock by Ellen (United Kingdom) with the loss of her captain. Commerce was on a voyage from Youghal to Liverpool.
Triton	United Kingdom	The ship departed from Whitehaven, Cumberland for Dublin. No further trace, presumed foundered in the Irish Sea with the loss of all hands.
Vigilance	United Kingdom	The ship was wrecked on Whiteness Point, near Whitehaven, Cumberland. Her crew were rescued.

=== 3 December ===
List of shipwrecks: 3 December 1818
Ship	State	Description
Dædalus	United Kingdom	The ship was abandoned in the North Sea in a sinking condition. Her crew were rescued by Woodall (United Kingdom). She was on a voyage from Sunderland, County Durham to London.
John and Mary	United Kingdom	The ship foundered in the Irish Sea off Strumble Head, Pembrokeshire. Her crew survived. She was on a voyage from "Beerhaven" to Swansea, Glamorgan.
Margaret	United Kingdom	The ship was driven ashore and severely damaged at Milford Haven, Pembrokeshire. She was on a voyage from Cork to Bristol, Gloucestershire.
Marie Magdalene	France	The ship was driven ashore near Les Sables-d'Olonne, Vendée. She was on a voyage from the Île d'Oléron, Charente-Inférieure to Les Sables-d'Olonne.
Mary	United Kingdom	The ship was driven ashore at Plymouth, Devon. She was on a voyage from South Shields, County Durham to Nantes, Loire-Inférieure , France. She was refloated with assistane and taken in to Plymouth for repairs.
Newcastle Packet	United Kingdom	The ship struck rocks near Londonderry and foundered. She was on a voyage from Leith, Lothian to Londonderry.
Wanskapen	Sweden	The ship was wrecked on Tiree, Argyllshire, United Kingdom. She was on a voyage from Stockholm to Baltimore, Maryland, United States.
Unnamed	United Kingdom	The ship, a ketch or a schooner, foundered in the Irish Sea. Her crew were rescued. She was on a voyage from Bantry, county Cork to Swansea, Glamorgan.

=== 4 December ===
List of shipwrecks: 4 December 1818
Ship	State	Description
Imperdor d'America	Portugal	The ship was lost at Figueira da Foz. She was on a voyage from Lisbon to Figueira da Foz.
Newcastle	United Kingdom	The ship was wrecked in the River Foyle. Her crew were rescued. She was on a voyage from Leith, Lothian to Londonderry.

=== 5 December ===
List of shipwrecks: 5 December 1818
Ship	State	Description
Augusta Amelia	Stettin	The ship ran aground at Stettin and was damaged.
Sarah	United Kingdom	The ship struck a rock off the Saltee Islands, County Wexford and was abandoned by her crew. She was on a voyage from Saint John, New Brunswick, British North America, to Glasgow, Renfrewshire. Sarah subsequently came ashore on the coast of County Wexford.
Triton	United Kingdom	The ship was lost off Plumb Point, Jamaica. All on board were rescued. She was on a voyage from Liverpool, Lancashire, to Kingston, Jamaica.
Union	United Kingdom	The ship was wrecked at Wexford. She was on a voyage from Glasgow to Waterford.

=== 6 December ===
List of shipwrecks: 6 December 1818
Ship	State	Description
Ann Alexander	United Kingdom	The ship was driven ashore at Boston, Massachusetts, United States. She was on a voyage from London to Boston.
Felix	United States	The schooner was lost near Tybee Island, Georgia.
Mary Ann	United Kingdom	The ship departed from Pictou, Nova Scotia, British North America, for Liverpool, Lancashire. No further trace, presumed foundered with the loss of all hands.
Rising Sun	United States	The brig was driven ashore at Philadelphia, Pennsylvania.
Sarah and Susan	United States	The ship was wrecked on the Cobassett Rocks, off the coast of Massachusetts. with the loss of four of her crew. She was on a voyage from Saint Petersburg, Russia to Boston.

=== 7 December ===
List of shipwrecks: 7 December 1818
Ship	State	Description
Ajax	United Kingdom	The ship departed from Saint John, New Brunswick, British North America, for Aberdeen. No further trace, presumed foundered with the loss of all hands.
General Moore	United Kingdom	The ship was driven ashore and wrecked at Stranraer, Wigtownshire.
Mysore	British East India Company	The East Indiaman foundered off "Pulo Sapato" with the loss of over 90 lives. There were eight survivors. She was on a voyage from China to the Red Sea.

=== 8 December ===
List of shipwrecks: 8 December 1818
Ship	State	Description
Indiana	United Kingdom	The ship was wrecked on the Gunfleet Sand, in the North Sea off the coast of Essex. Her crew were rescued.
Lord Hill	United Kingdom	The ship was driven ashore on the coast of Jamaica. She was on a voyage from Saint John, New Brunswick, British North America, to Jamaica.

=== 9 December ===
List of shipwrecks: 9 December 1818
Ship	State	Description
Amelia	United States	The ship was driven ashore and severely damaged at Fastness, Orkney Islands, United Kingdom. She was on a voyage from Amsterdam, North Holland, Netherlands to New York. Amelia was later refloated and taken in to Otterswick, Orkney Islands.
Frederick	United Kingdom	The ship ran aground in the River Thames at London Bridge and was damaged. She was on a voyage from Tarragona, Spain to London.
Two Sisters	United Kingdom	The ship was wrecked at Plumb Point, Jamaica. She was on a voyage from Aruba to Kingston, Jamaica.

=== 10 December ===
List of shipwrecks: 10 December 1818
Ship	State	Description
Diana	United Kingdom	The waterlogged ship was abandoned in the Atlantic Ocean (47°30′N 20°13′W). Her crew were rescued by the brig Helen (United States). Diana was on a voyage from Saint John, New Brunswick, British North America, to Liverpool, Lancashire. Diana came ashore at Le Croisic, Loire-Inférieure, France on 9 March 1819.
Emily	United Kingdom	The sloop was wrecked near Lands' End, Cornwall. She was on a voyage from Bristol, Gloucestershire to Plymouth, Devon.
Helena	(United Kingdom of Great Britain and Ireland) British North America	The ship was driven ashore and severely damaged on Bermuda. She was later refloated.
Nordstern	Flag unknown	The ship was wrecked near Lagos, Portugal with the loss of all but one of her crew. She was on a voyage from Barcelona to A Coruña, Spain.
Resolution	United Kingdom	The ship foundered in the Bristol Channel. Her crew were rescued by Mary (United Kingdom). Resolution was on a voyage from Caernarfon to London.

=== 11 December ===
List of shipwrecks: 11 December 1818
Ship	State	Description
Hind	United Kingdom	The ship was severely damaged in the Tay. She was subsequently taken in to Dundee, Forfarshire in a waterlogged condition.
Providence	United Kingdom	The ship struck rocks and sank at Crookhaven, County Cork. She was on a voyage from Crookhaven to São Miguel, Azores, Portugal.

=== 12 December ===
List of shipwrecks: 12 December 1818
Ship	State	Description
Esperanza	Portugal	The ship was wrecked on the Europa Rocks, in the Mozambique Channel. Thirteen of her 32 crew were rescued on 28 December by Dos Hermanos (Portugal), the remainder having stayed with the wreck salvaging her cargo.
Omheten	Sweden	The ship was driven ashore on Öland. She was on a voyage from Stockholm to Lisbon, Portugal.
Tagus	United Kingdom	The ship was wrecked on the Gull Rock, 6 leagues (18 nautical miles (33 km; 21 mi)) west of Grand Manan Island, New Brunswick, British North America, with the ultimate loss of nine of her crew. She was on a voyage from Glasgow, Renfrewshire to Saint John, New Brunswick, British North America.
Venns	United Kingdom	The ship ran aground near Londonderry. She was on a voyage from Coleraine, County Antrim to Londonderry.

=== 13 December ===
List of shipwrecks: 13 December 1818
Ship	State	Description
Bulwark	United Kingdom	The ship was wrecked on Anegada, Virgin Islands. She was on a voyage from New Brunswick, British North America, to Jamaica.
Charlotte	United Kingdom	The ship foundered in the Atlantic Ocean off Trepassey, Newfoundland, British North America. She was on a voyage from Quebec, British North America, to Liverpool, Lancashire.

=== 15 December ===
List of shipwrecks: 15 December 1818
Ship	State	Description
Cinclanatus	United States	The brig was driven ashore at New Orleans, Louisiana.
Sophia	United Kingdom	The brig was wrecked 180 nautical miles (330 km) south of Cape Chat, Quebe, British North America with the loss of all hands. She was on a voyage from Quebec City, British North America to Greenock, Renfrewshire.
Unnamed	Flag unknown	The galiot was wrecked 180 nautical miles (330 km) south of Cape Chat. Her crew survived.

=== 16 December ===
List of shipwrecks: 16 December 1818
Ship	State	Description
Hazard	United Kingdom	The ship foundered off Saint John, New Brunswick, British North America. She was on a voyage from Jamaica to St. John's.

=== 17 December ===
List of shipwrecks: 17 December 1818
Ship	State	Description
Bee	United Kingdom	The ship capsized at Milford Haven, Pembrokeshire. She was later righted.
Jane	United Kingdom	The ship was driven ashore and wrecked in Carnarvon Bay with the loss of all hands. She was on a voyage from Dominica to London.

=== 18 December ===
List of shipwrecks: 18 December 1818
Ship	State	Description
Albion	United Kingdom	The ship struck the pier at Bridlington, Yorkshire and sank. She was on a voyage from London to Newcastle upon Tyne, Northumberland. Albion was later refloated and repaired.
Baring	United Kingdom	The ship ran aground on the Brake Sand, in the North Sea off the coast of Kent. She was refloated.
Charles and Mary	United Kingdom	The sloop foundered in the North Sea off Chapel St. Leonards, Lincolnshire. Her crew were rescued. She was on a voyage from Wisbech, Cambridgeshire to Hull, Yorkshire.
Dairy Maid	United Kingdom	The sloop was run down and sunk in the North Sea off Cromer, Norfolk by London (United Kingdom). Her crew were rescued by London. Dairy Maid was on a voyage from York to London.
Fortuna	United Kingdom	The ship was wrecked at Calais, France. She was on a voyage from Texel, North Holland, Netherlands to Saint-Valery-sur-Somme, Somme, and Havre de Grâce, Seine-Inférieure, France.
Jong Johan	Duchy of Schleswig	The ship was driven ashore at Calais. She was on a voyage from Hull to Marseille, Bouches-du-Rhône, France.
President von Blucher	Hamburg	The ship was driven ashore near Marseille. She was on a voyage from Hamburg to Cádiz, Spain and Marseille. President von Blucher was refloated on 7 January 1819 and taken in to Marseille.

=== 19 December ===
List of shipwrecks: 19 December 1818
Ship	State	Description
Albion	United Kingdom	The ship struck the pier at Bridlington, Yorkshire and sank. She was later refloated and placed under repair.

=== 20 December ===
List of shipwrecks: 20 December 1818
Ship	State	Description
Collector	(United Kingdom of Great Britain and Ireland) British North America	The sloop was driven ashore and wrecked at Hay Cove, Nova Scotia. Her crew were rescued. She was on a voyage from Ferryland, Nova Scotia, to St. John's, Newfoundland.
Mars	Netherlands	The ship was driven ashore on "Onrust". She was on a voyage from Lisbon, Portugal to Zierikzee, North Holland.
William and Sarah	United Kingdom	The Thames barge ran aground and sank at Newhaven, Sussex. Her crew were rescued. She was on a voyage from Worthing, Sussex to Shoreham-by-Sea, Sussex.

=== 21 December ===
List of shipwrecks: 21 December 1818
Ship	State	Description
Effort	United Kingdom	The brig was wrecked on the Goodwin Sands, Kent. Her crew survived. She was on a voyage from Cephalonia, Greece to Hull, Yorkshire.
Mariner	United States	The ship departed from Philadelphia, Pennsylvania, for Oporto, Portugal. No further trace, presumed foundered in the Atlantic Ocean with the loss of all hands.
Mary	United Kingdom	The brig was wrecked on the Goodwin Sands. She was on a voyage from Limerick to London.
Seeman	Danzig	The ship ran aground near Pillau, Prussia. All on board were rescued by a lifeboat. She was on a voyage from Hull to Danzig and Pillau.

=== 22 December ===
List of shipwrecks: 22 December 1818
Ship	State	Description
Clumbus	United Kingdom	The ship was wrecked on Jamaica with the loss of three of her crew. She was on a voyage from Glasgow, Renfrewshire to Jamaica.
Pearl	United Kingdom	The ship was severely damaged by ice at Twielenfleth, Kingdom of Hanover. She was on a voyage from Hamburg to London.
Radcliffe	United Kingdom	The ship was lost new Cape St. George, Newfoundland, British North America. She was on a voyage from Picton, Upper Canada, British North America, to Liverpool, Lancashire.

=== 23 December ===
List of shipwrecks: 23 December 1818
Ship	State	Description
Admiral Durham	United Kingdom	The ship was wrecked on the west coast of Bermuda with the loss of a crew member. She was on a voyage from Demerara to Bermuda.
Phœbe	United States	The ship was driven ashore and wrecked at Marblehead, Massachusetts, with the loss of a crew member. She was on a voyage from Cádiz, Spain to Marblehead.
Unnamed	Kingdom of the Two Sicilies	The ship was wrecked near Naples. She was on a voyage from Tunis, Tunisia to Naples.

=== 24 December ===
List of shipwrecks: 24 December 1818
Ship	State	Description
Beaver	United Kingdom	The ship collided with Achilles (United Kingdom) in the North Sea and sank. Her crew were rescued by Achilles. Beaver was on a voyage from Banff, Aberdeenshire to Sunderland, County Durham.
Emily	United Kingdom	The sloop was wrecked on the Runnel Stone, in the Atlantic Ocean off the coast of Cornwall. Her crew were rescued. She was on a voyage from Bristol, Gloucestershire to Plymouth, Devon.
Endeavour	United Kingdom	The ship departed from São Miguel, Azores for London. No further trace, presumed foundered with the loss of all hands.
Minerva	Portugal	Atlantic slave trade: The ship was wrecked on the Alins Bank, in the Atlantic Ocean off Maranhão, Brazil. Only three crew and 40 slaves were rescued. She was on a voyage from the Kingdom of Loango to Maranhão.
Perseverance	United Kingdom	The ship sprang a leak and was abandoned in the Atlantic Ocean. She was on a voyage from Jamaica to Porto Plata, Haiti.

=== 25 December ===
List of shipwrecks: 25 December 1818
Ship	State	Description
Diana	United Kingdom	The ship departed from Jamaica for St. Mary's, Nova Scotia, British North America. No further trace, presumed foundered with the loss of all hands.
Fanny	United Kingdom	The ship was driven ashore and wrecked on the Sutherland coast. Her crew were rescued.
Gorgaff Castle	United Kingdom	The schooner was run down and sunk in the North Sea off Scarborough, Yorkshire by Fortune (United Kingdom). Her crew were rescued by Fortune. Gorgaff Castle was on a voyage from Hull, Yorkshire to Aberdeen.
Jong Ebhardius	Netherlands	The ship ran aground on the Kentish Knock. Her crew were rescued. She was on a voyage from Antwerp to London, United Kingdom.
Martha	United Kingdom	The ship was driven ashore and wrecked at Harrington, Cumberland.
Mary	United States	The ship was wrecked off the south west coast of Bermuda. She was on a voyage from New York to St. Thomas, Virgin Islands.
Nymph	United Kingdom	The ship was driven ashore at Harrington. She was later refloated and taken in to Harrington.
Unnamed	United Kingdom	The brig was wrecked off the south west coast of Bermuda. She was on a voyage from Barbadoes to Bermuda.

=== 26 December ===
List of shipwrecks: 26 December 1818
Ship	State	Description
Adventure	United Kingdom	The sloop was run down and sunk in the North Sea off Flamborough Head, Yorkshire. Her crew survived. She was on a voyage from Leith, Lothian to King's Lynn, Norfolk.
Helen	United Kingdom	The sloop was lost near St. John's, Newfoundland, British North America, with the loss of six lives.
Jeannie	France	The ship was driven ashore and damaged at Penzance, Cornwall, United Kingdom. She was on a voyage from Marseille, Bouches-du-Rhône to Rouen, Seine-Inférieure. Jeannie was refloated on 29 December and taken in to Penzance.
Juno	United Kingdom	The ship was wrecked at Oporto, Portugal.
Senhora de Nazare	Portugal	The ship foundered in the Atlantic Ocean. She was on a voyage from Viana do Castelo to Oporto.

=== 27 December ===
List of shipwrecks: 27 December 1818
Ship	State	Description
Dolphin	Netherlands	The ship was driven ashore at Málaga, Spain. She was later refloated.
Hope	United Kingdom	The ship was driven ashore near Lymington, Hampshire. She was on a voyage from London to Bristol, Gloucestershire. Hopewas refloated on 30 December and put into Cowes, Isle of Wight.
Jane	United Kingdom	The ship was driven ashore on Jura, Inner Hebrides. She was on a voyage from Dublin to Londonderry.
Oglethorpe	United Kingdom	The ship was struck by lightning in the Atlantic Ocean (39°30′N 58°30′W) and set afire. She was on a voyage from Savannah, Georgia to Liverpool, Lancashire. The fire was extinguished and she completed her voyage.

=== 28 December ===
List of shipwrecks: 28 December 1818
Ship	State	Description
Betsey	United Kingdom	The ship was wrecked at Newbiggin Point, Northumberland with the loss of all but one of her crew.
Hope	United Kingdom	The full-rigged ship departed from Kingston, Jamaica for St. Jago de Cuba, Cuba. No further trace, presumed foundered with the loss of all hands.

=== 29 December ===
List of shipwrecks: 29 December 1818
Ship	State	Description
Diana	United Kingdom	The ship was wrecked on the Haisborough Sands, in the North Sea off the coast of Norfolk. Her crew were rescued. She was on a voyage from Hull, Yorkshire to London.
St. George	United Kingdom	The ship was sighted in the Atlantic Ocean off the coast of Ireland in a disabled condition. No further trace, presumed foundered with the loss of all hands. She was on a voyage from Antigua to Liverpool, Lancashire.

=== 30 December ===
List of shipwrecks: 30 December 1818
Ship	State	Description
Ann	United Kingdom	The ship was driven ashore in the Copeland Islands, County Down. She was on a voyage from New Brunswick, British North America, to Belfast, County Antrim. Ann was refloated on 1 January 1819 and taken in to Belfast.
Standley	United Kingdom	The ship was driven ashore at Valencia, Spain.
Unity	United Kingdom	The ship sprang a leak and was beached at Ramsgate, Kent, where she was wrecked. She was on a voyage from London to Shoreham-by-Sea, Sussex.
Victory	United Kingdom	The ship was wrecked on the Monkstone, in the Bristol Channel. She was on a voyage from Newport, Monmouthshire to an Irish port.

=== 31 December ===
List of shipwrecks: 31 December 1818
Ship	State	Description
Andrew	United Kingdom	The ship was driven ashore on Beach Island, Barnegat Inlet. She was subsequently wrecked on 3 January 1819. All on board were rescued. Andrew was on a voyage from Liverpool, Lancashire, to Philadelphia, Pennsylvania, United States.
Proserpine	United Kingdom	The ship was driven ashore near Wells-next-the-Sea, Norfolk. She was on a voyage from Carron, Stirlingshire to London. Proserpine was later refloated and taken in to Wells-next-the-Sea.

=== Unknown date ===
List of shipwrecks: Unknown date in December 1818
Ship	State	Description
Acasta	United Kingdom	The ship was wrecked on Dry Tortuga before 5 December. Her crew were rescued. She was on a voyage from Jamaica to Liverpool, Lancashire.
Amazon	Portugal	The ship was lost whilst on a voyage from Oporto to Aveiro.
Beaver	United Kingdom	The ship foundered in the North Sea off Sunderland, County Durham. She was on a voyage from London to Banff, Aberdeenshire.
Cleopatra	United Kingdom	The ship was wrecked on the west coast of Cuba. Her crew were rescued. She was on a voyage from Jamaica to Havana, Cuba.
Courier de Mole	France	The ship was driven ashore at "Pere", Vendée.
Darlington	United Kingdom	The ship foundered in the North Sea in early December. She was on a voyage from Newcastle upon Tyne, Northumberland to Hull. Yorkshire.
Deux Sœurs	France	The ship was wrecked at Saint-Martin-de-Ré, Charente-Inférieure.
Eleanor & Betty	United Kingdom	The ship was wrecked near Ramsey, Isle of Man. She was on a voyage from Belfast, County Antrim to Liverpool.
Eliza	United Kingdom	The ship was wrecked in the Orkney Islands. She was on a voyage from Memel, Prussia to Londonderry.
Fortuna	Denmark	The ship was driven ashore at Kullen, Sweden. She was on a voyage from St. Croix, Virgin Islands to Copenhagen. Fortuna was later refloated. She arrived at Copenhagen on 22 December.
Governor Hopkins	United States	The ship was wrecked on Brenton's Reef. She was on a voyage from Savannah, Georgia, to Providence, Rhode Island.
Governor Milne	United Kingdom	The ship was driven ashore and severely damaged. She was on a voyage from Quebec City, Lower Canada, British North America, to London. Governor Milne was later refloated and taken in to Tenby, Pembrokeshire.
Helen	(United Kingdom of Great Britain and Ireland) British North America	The schooner was lost off Newfoundland.
Henriette	Stettin	The ship was wrecked on Møn, Denmark. She was on a voyage from Stettin to London, United Kingdom
Herman	Lübeck	The ship was driven ashore and wrecked on "Oldesholm". She was on a voyage from Saint Petersburg, Russia to Lübeck.
Jane	United Kingdom	The ship was driven ashore and wrecked at Great Yarmouth, Norfolk. She was on a voyage from Vyborg to Bristol.
Jeune Auguste	Norway	The ship foundered off Heligoland. Four crew were rescued. She was on a voyage from Newcastle upon Tyne to Frederickstadt.
Judiana	United Kingdom	The ship was wrecked on the Gunfleet Sand, in the North Sea off the cost of Essex. Her crew were rescued.
Juno	Stettin	The ship was driven ashore and damaged on Saltholm, Denmark. She was on a voyage from Stettin to Edam, North Holland, Netherlands.
King George	United Kingdom	The ship was lost in the Saltee Islands, County Wexford. Her crew were rescued. She was on a voyage from Kinsale, County Cork to Liverpool.
Knight of Kerry	United Kingdom	The ship struck a sunken rock. She was on a voyage from Saint Petersburg, Russia to London. She put in to "Eikness" in a waterlogged condition.
Lilly	United States	The schooner was wrecked off Exuma in a hurricane. Her crew were rescued. She was on a voyage from Port-au-Prince, Haiti to Exuma.
Lion	(United Kingdom of Great Britain and Ireland) Jamaica	The schooner was wrecked near Portobelo, Viceroyalty of New Granada.
Lord Wellington	(United Kingdom of Great Britain and Ireland) British North America	The brig was lost at "Point Ebaneau".
Petite Clementine	France	The ship was wrecked on the Spanish coast.
Preston Island	United Kingdom	The ship foundered in the North Sea. She was on a voyage from London to Grangemouth, Stirlingshire.
Revenu	United States	The sloop was lost in the Currituck Inlet.
Santzkow	Prussia	The ship was wrecked near Soresk, Sweden. She was on a voyage from London to Wolgast.
Sophia	United Kingdom	The brig was wrecked south of Cape Chat, Lower Canada with the loss of all hands before 15 December. She was on a voyage from Quebec City to Greenock, Renfrewshire.
Three Sisters	United Kingdom	The brig ran aground and capsized at Harwich, Essex. She was refloated on 4 December and taken in to Harwich for repairs.
Vigilante	Netherlands	The ship ran aground and was wrecked at Great Yarmouth, Norfolk, United Kingdom. She was on a voyage from Harlingen, Friesland to London, United Kingdom.

== Unknown date ==
List of shipwrecks: Unknown date in 1818
Ship	State	Description
Active	United Kingdom	The ship was lost in Conception Bay. She was on a voyage from Stranraer, Dumfriesshire to Newfoundland, British North America.
Alpha	United Kingdom	The ship was wrecked in the Delaware River.
Echo	Spain	The ship was wrecked on the Memory Rock. She was on a voyage from Veracruz to La Guyara, Viceroyalty of New Granada.
Friendship	United Kingdom	The ship was driven ashore at "Bucktush", New Brunswick, British North America, between 3 September and 28 October.
George Little	United Kingdom	The ship was driven ashore at Havana, Cuba.
Hibernia	United Kingdom	The ship was wrecked on Petit Bois Island, Alabama Territory. She was on a voyage from Madeira, Portugal to New Orleans, Louisiana.
Horizon	United States	The ship was wrecked on Fish Key, in the Abaco Islands. She was on a voyage from Philadelphia, Pennsylvania, to New Orleans.
John	United Kingdom	The ship was wrecked on Cape Breton Island, British North America with the loss of over 80 lies. There was only one survivor of her crew and 34 passengers. She was on a voyage from Leith, Lothian to Halifax, Nova Scotia, British North America.
HMS Magician	Royal Navy	The frigate was wrecked at Mauritius.
Marianne	Netherlands	The ship was lost in the Bahama Channel. She was on a voyage from Antwerp to Havana, Cuba.
Mary Ann	United States	The ship was wrecked off Cape Cod, Massachusetts. She was on a voyage from Baltimore, Maryland, to Boston, Massachusetts.
Morgan Rattler	United Kingdom	The schooner was lost in the Orinoco River. Her crew were rescued.
Nautilus	Flag unknown	The ship was wrecked on the north coast of Puerto Rico.
Otis	United Kingdom	The ship was driven ashore and wrecked at Sandy Hook, New Jersey, United States. She was on a voyage from Dublin to New York.
Rezolucão	Portugal	The ship was wrecked at "Manuel Luez". She was on a voyage from Maranhão, United Kingdom of Portugal, Brazil and the Algarves to "Anzola".
Russian Company	United Kingdom	The ship was damaged by ice off Cape Chat, Lower Canada, British North America, and was abandoned by her crew. She was on a voyage from London to Quebec City, Lower Canada.
Sisters	United Kingdom	The schooner was lost on the coast of Labrador, British North America.
Soliman	Ottoman Empire	The ship was wrecked at Mauritius.
Union	United Kingdom	The ship foundered off the Cape of Good Hope with the loss of all hands.
Union	United Kingdom	The ship was driven ashore on Hare Island, in the St. Lawrence River. She was on a voyage from Quebec City to Liverpool, Lancashire.
Venus	United States	The ship was wrecked on the coast of East Florida, New Spain. She was on a voyage from Jamaica to New York.
Vestal	British East India Company	The East Indiaman was wrecked in the Strait of Malacca.
Willerby	United Kingdom	The ship was driven ashore and wrecked on Ambon Island, Netherlands East Indies in late February or early March. Her crew were rescued.
Unnamed	United Kingdom	The ship was wrecked in the Gulf of Suez.
