= List of shipwrecks in 1819 =

This list of shipwrecks in 1819 includes ships sunk, wrecked or otherwise lost during 1819.

table of contents
1819
Jan	Feb	Mar	Apr
May	Jun	Jul	Aug
Sep	Oct	Nov	Dec
Unknown date

== January ==
=== 1 January ===
List of shipwrecks: 1 January 1819
Ship	State	Description
Basseterre	United Kingdom	The ship caught fire at Greenock, Renfrewshire and was scuttled.
General Brown	United Kingdom	The ship was wrecked on the Santa Pilly Rocks. She was on a voyage from Bengal, India to Gibraltar. All on board survived.
George Washington	United States	The ship was wrecked in the Abaco Islands. Her crew were rescued. She was on a voyage from New York to Havana, Cuba.
John Shand	United Kingdom	The cutter was lost in Port Morant Bay, Jamaica.

=== 2 January ===
List of shipwrecks: 2 January 1819
Ship	State	Description
Eckardina Maria	Denmark	The ship was driven ashore near Gilleleje.
Nancy	United Kingdom	The brig foundered. Her crew survived. She was on a voyage from Jamaica to London.
Union	Sweden	The full-rigged ship was driven ashore on Patience Island, Rhode Island, United States.
Zeelust	Netherlands	The ship ran aground on the Ooster Sandbank, in the North Sea. She was on a voyage from Smyrna, Ottoman Empire to Rotterdam, South Holland. Zeelust was refloated on 5 January and taken in to Hellevoetsluis, South Holland.

=== 3 January ===
For the wrecking of the British ship Andrew on this day, see the entry for 31 December 1818.

List of shipwrecks: 3 January 1819
Ship	State	Description
Elizabeth	United Kingdom	The ship sprang a leak and foundered in the North Sea. Her crew were rescued. She was on a voyage from Great Yarmouth, Norfolk to London.
Hazard	United States	The ship was wrecked near Nassau, Bahamas. She was on a voyage from Boston, Massachusetts, to Mobile, Alabama Territory.

=== 4 January ===
List of shipwrecks: 4 January 1819
Ship	State	Description
Amity	United Kingdom	The ship ran aground on the Gunfleet Sand, in the North Sea off the coast of Essex. She was on a voyage from London to Whitby, Yorkshire. She was refloated with assistance and taken in to Harwich, Essex.
Friendship	United Kingdom	The ship was wrecked at the mouth of the River Dee with the loss of a crew member.
Mary	United Kingdom	The ship was wrecked near Douglas, Isle of Man. Her crew were rescued. She was on a voyage from Liverpool, Lancashire to Newry, County Down.

=== 5 January ===
List of shipwrecks: 5 January 1819
Ship	State	Description
Thomas	United Kingdom	The ship ran aground in the Pearl River.
Triton	United Kingdom	The ship was severely damaged by rough seas in the Atlantic Ocean with the ultimate loss of two of her crew. Survivors were rescued on 14 January by Highlander ( United Kingdom) and Mexican (United States). Triton was on a voyage from St. John's, Newfoundland, British North America to Havre de Grâce, Seine-Inférieure, France.

=== 6 January ===
List of shipwrecks: 6 January 1819
Ship	State	Description
Cæsar	United Kingdom	The ship was driven ashore at Birkenhead, Cheshire.
Druid	United Kingdom	The ship was driven ashore and wrecked at Cork. She was on a voyage from Cork to Southampton, Hampshire.
Durham	United Kingdom	The ship was sighted off Cape Clear Island, County Cork, bound for Liverpool, Lancashire. No further trace, presumed foundered in the Irish Sea with the loss of all hands.
Union	United Kingdom	The ship was driven ashore in the River Shannon and was consequently declared a constructive total loss. She was on a voyage from Limerick to London.

=== 7 January ===
List of shipwrecks: 7 January 1819
Ship	State	Description
Le Gildas	France	The ship was driven ashore at Rye, Sussex, United Kingdom. Her crew were rescued. She was on a voyage from "Chalon" to Dunkerque, Nord.

=== 8 January ===
List of shipwrecks: 8 January 1819
Ship	State	Description
Catherine	United Kingdom	The ship was driven ashore at Belragan Point, County Down. She was on a voyage from Drogheda, County Louth to Liverpool, Lancashire.
Eliza	United Kingdom	The ship was driven ashore at Ardglass, County Down. She wason a voyage from Belfast, County Antrim to London.
Hope	United Kingdom	The ship was driven ashore at Waterford. She was on a voyage from Saint John, New Brunswick, British North America to Liverpool.
Lavinia	United Kingdom	The brig was abandoned in the Atlantic Ocean with the loss of two of her six crew. Survivors were rescued by Fanny ( United Kingdom). Lavinia was on a voyage from Newfoundland to Cádiz, Spain.
Trelawney	United Kingdom	The ship was driven ashore and wrecked near Stevenston, Ayrshire with the loss of fifteen of the twenty people on board. Four rescuers also died. She was on a voyage from Glasgow, Renfrewshire to Jamaica.
Union	United Kingdom	The ship was driven ashore in Labasheda Bay. She was on a voyage from Limerick to London.

=== 9 January ===
List of shipwrecks: 9 January 1819
Ship	State	Description
Bee	United Kingdom	The sloop struck the pier at Sunderland, County Durham and sank.
Beresford Packet	United Kingdom	The ship was driven ashore and damaged at Milford Haven, Pembrokeshire. She was on a voyage from Cork to Bristol, Gloucestershire. Beresford Packet was later refloated.
Branste	United Kingdom	The ship was driven ashore and wrecked between Rush and Skerries, county Dublin. She was on a voyage from Whitehaven, Cumberland to Newport, Monmouthshire.
Christian	United Kingdom	The sloop was wrecked on Canna, Argyllshire.
Dispatch	United Kingdom	The ship was driven ashore on the Isle of Arran, Ayrshire.
Friends Increase	United Kingdom	The ship was driven ashore in Pegwell Bay, Kent. She was on a voyage from Sunderland to Sandwich, Kent.
Hope	United Kingdom	The ship was driven ashore at Waterford. She was on a voyage from Saint John, New Brunswick, British North America to Liverpool, Lancashire.
Ranger	United Kingdom	The ship was driven ashore at Holyhead, Anglesey. She was on a voyage from Belfast, County Antrim to London.
St. George	United Kingdom	The ship was driven ashore on the west coast of South Uist, Outer Hebrides. She was on a voyage from Antigua to Liverpool, Lancashire. St. George was refloated in June.
Waterloo	United Kingdom	The ship was driven ashore near Castles Townshend, County Cork. She was on a voyage from Sicily to Liverpool.

=== 10 January ===
List of shipwrecks: 10 January 1819
Ship	State	Description
Abundance	United Kingdom	The ship was driven ashore and wrecked at Collistown, Aberdeenshire with the loss of six lives. She was on a voyage from Sunderland, County Durham to Aberdeen.
Hamilton	United Kingdom	The ship was driven ashore in the Formby Channel. She was on a voyage from Naples, Kingdom of the Two Sicilies to Liverpool, Lancashire.
Hoffnung	Kingdom of Hanover	The ship was abandoned in the North Sea off Vlieland, Friesland, Netherlands. She was on a voyage from London, United Kingdom to the Ems.
Hunter	United Kingdom	The ship was driven ashore and wrecked at Forvie, Aberdeenshire. Her crew were rescued. She was on a voyage from Sunderland to Aberdeen.
John Langdon	United States	The ship was driven ashore at Chatham, Massachusetts. She was on a voyage from Surinam to Portsmouth, New Hampshire.
William	United Kingdom	The ship was driven ashore and wrecked at Portland, Dorset with the loss of all but one of her crew. She was on a voyage from São Miguel Island, Azores to Portsmouth, Hampshire.

=== 11 January ===
List of shipwrecks: 11 January 1819
Ship	State	Description
Betsey	United Kingdom	The ship was wrecked on the Traith Bar, Carmarthen with the loss of seven lives. Two survivors were rescued. She was on a voyage from Waterford to Bristol, Gloucestershire.
Emanuel	Norway	The ship sprang a leak and foundered off the Mid Jagger. She was on a voyage from Bergen to Wolgast, Prussia.
Friendschaft	Flag unknown	The ship was driven ashore and severely damaged at Maltreath, Anglesey with the loss of all but one of her crew. She was on a voyage from Liverpool, Lancashire, United Kingdom to Havre de Grâce, Seine-Inférieure, France. Friendschaft was refloated on 29 January and taken in to Amlwch.
Isabella	United Kingdom	The ship was driven ashore and wrecked near Padstow, Cornwall. She was on a voyage from Smyrna, Ottoman Empire to London.
Kitty	United States	The ship sprang a leak and was abandoned in the Irish Sea. Her crew were rescued by Marmion ( United Kingdom). Kitty was on a voyage from Virginia to Falmouth, Cornwall, United Kingdom. She was subsequently driven ashore at Fishguard, Pembrokeshire, United Kingdom.
Mary	United Kingdom	The ship was wrecked in Blacksod Bay, County Mayo. She was on a voyage from Newfoundland, British North America to Waterford.
Otway	United Kingdom	The ship ran aground at Whitehaven, Cumberland. She was on a voyage from Boston, Massachusetts, United States to Liverpool.
Peggy	United Kingdom	The ship was driven ashore in Loch Indaal. She was on a voyage from Halifax, Nova Scotia, British North America to Liverpool.

=== 12 January ===
List of shipwrecks: 12 January 1819
Ship	State	Description
Betsey	United Kingdom	The ship was sighted off Lowestoft, Suffolk whilst on a voyage from Rotterdam, South Holland, Netherlands to Southampton, Hampshire. No further trace, presumed foundered with the loss of all hands.
Edward	United Kingdom	The schooner was wrecked 10 leagues (30 nautical miles (56 km)) south of Whitehaven, Cumberland. Her crew were rescued. She was on a voyage from Seville, Spain to Dublin.
Maria	United Kingdom	The ship was lost on "Lester Land". She was on a voyage from Aalborg, Denmark to Newcastle upon Tyne, Northumberland.
Pandora	Bremen	The ship struck rocks to Saint Thomas, Virgin Islands and was wrecked. She was on a voyage from Bremen to Saint Thomas.
Pulteney	United Kingdom	The ship was driven ashore and wrecked on the Barnhowrie Bank, in the Solway Firth. Her crew were rescued. She was on a voyage from Bristol, Gloucestershire to Greenock, Renfrewshire.

=== 13 January ===
List of shipwrecks: 13 January 1819
Ship	State	Description
Emily	United Kingdom	The ship was driven ashore in the River Shannon. She was on a voyage from Pictou, Nova Scotia, British North America to Liverpool, Lancashire.

=== 14 January ===
List of shipwrecks: 14 January 1819
Ship	State	Description
Active	United Kingdom	The ship was run down and sunk in the North Sea off Scarborough, Yorkshire. Her crew were rescued. She was on a voyage from South Shields, County Durham to Rouen, Seine-Inférieure, France.
Minerva	United Kingdom	The ship was driven ashore and wrecked in Mulbay, near Loop Head Lighthouse, County Clare. She was on a voyage from Newfoundland to Limerick.

=== 15 January ===
List of shipwrecks: 15 January 1819
Ship	State	Description
Farmer's Adventure	United Kingdom	The ship collided with the pier at Whitby, Yorkshire and sprang a leak.
Jane	United Kingdom	The ship was driven ashore and wrecked at Towyn Trefan, Carnarfonshire with the loss of all on board. She was on a voyage from Dominica to Liverpool, Lancashire.
Kitty	United Kingdom	The ship ran aground on Scroby Sands, Norfolk. She was on a voyage from Hull, Yorkshire to London. She was refloated and taken in to Great Yarmouth, Norfolk.
Marygold	United Kingdom	The ship was driven ashore and wrecked at Ballywalter, County Down with the loss of all hands.
Theophile	France	The ship capsized at Saint-Malo, Ille-et-Vilaine.

=== 16 January ===
List of shipwrecks: 16 January 1819
Ship	State	Description
Alexander	United Kingdom	The ship ran aground on the Scroby Sands, Norfolk. She was on a voyage from London to Newcastle upon Tyne, Northumberland.
Anglam	United Kingdom	The ship was driven against the pier at Whitehaven, Cumberland and sank. She was on a voyage from Troon, Ayrshire to Whitehaven.
Duke of Wellington	United Kingdom	The ship was in collision with another vessel off Aldeburgh, Suffolk and was severely damaged. She was on a voyage from South Shields, County Durham to London. Duke of Wellington put into Maldon, Essex.
Friends	United Kingdom	The ship was wrecked on Skagen, Denmark. Her crew were rescued. She was on a voyage from Randers, Denmark to Newcastle-upon-Tyne, Northumberland.
Pallas	United Kingdom	The ship was driven ashore between Cucq and Étaples, Pas-de-Calais, France. Her crew were rescued. She was on a voyage from New York City, United States to London.
Pharos	United Kingdom	The ship was driven ashore at Greenock. She was on a voyage from Dundalk, County Louth to Leith, Lothian.

=== 17 January ===
List of shipwrecks: 17 January 1819
Ship	State	Description
Able	United Kingdom	The ship was driven ashore and severely damaged at Duncannon Head, County Wexford. She was on a voyage from Kinsale, County Cork to Dublin.
Fortuna	United Kingdom	The ship was driven ashore at Liverpool, Lancashire. She was on a voyage from Prince Edward Island, British North America to Liverpool.
Fortune	United Kingdom	The ship was wrecked on the Kentish Knock. Her crew survived. She was on a voyage from Hull, Yorkshire to Madeira, Portugal amd Jamaica
Harmony	United Kingdom	The ship was wrecked in Rossbeigh Bay, near Castlemaine, County Kerry, with the loss of fourteen lives. She was on a voyage from Saint John, New Brunswick, British North America to Liverpool. There were three survivors.
Heroine	United Kingdom	The ship ran aground on the Altar, off Harwich, Essex. She was on a voyage from Sunderland, County Durham to London. She was refloated and towed in to Harwich.
Lord Hill	United Kingdom	The barque was driven ashore and wrecked near the mouth of the River Ribble with the loss of all 29 people on board. She was on a voyage from Douglas, Isle of Man to Liverpool.
Nelson	United Kingdom	The ship was abandoned in the Atlantic Ocean (46°00′N 44°30′W). All on board were rescued by Charles (United States). Nelson was on a voyage from Cork to Boston, Massachusetts, United States.
Perseverance	United Kingdom	The ship ran aground on the Altar. She was on a voyage from London to Hull. She was refloated and taken in to Harwich in a severely leaky condition.

=== 18 January ===
List of shipwrecks: 18 January 1819
Ship	State	Description
James Fitzpatrick	United Kingdom	The ship struck an anchor and sank at Liverpool, Lancashire. She was on a voyage from Youghall, County Cork to Liverpool.
Regulator	United Kingdom	The ship was driven ashore at "Landelfoot", Ayrshire. She was on a voyage from Belfast, County Antrim to Liverpool.
Venerable	United Kingdom	The ship was wrecked at New Quay, Cardiganshire. Her crew were rescued. She was on a voyage from Africa to Liverpool.
Weser	Bremen	The ship was driven ashore at Rockaway Beach, Long Island, New York, United States.

=== 19 January ===
List of shipwrecks: 19 January 1819
Ship	State	Description
Amity	United Kingdom	The ship was wrecked on the East Hoyle Bank, in Liverpool Bay. Her crew were rescued. She was on a voyage from St. Andrews, New Brunswick to Liverpool, Lancashire.
Mary	United Kingdom	The ship was driven ashore and wrecked at Wijk aan Zee, North Holland, Netherlands. She was on a voyage from Vlissingen, Zeeland, Netherlands to Great Yarmouth, Norfolk.
Recovery	United Kingdom	The ship was run down and sunk in the River Thames by Sally ( United Kingdom). Her crew were rescued.
Scipio	United Kingdom	The ship ran ahround on the Herd Sand, in the North Sea off the coast of County Durham. She was refloated the next day.
St. Lawrence	United Kingdom	The ship was wrecked on Islay with the loss of all hands. She was on a voyage from Lisbon, Portugal to Newfoundland, British North America.
St. Paul	United Kingdom	The ship was driven ashore on Ameland, Friesland, Netherlands. She was later refloated and taken in to Harlingen, Friesland for repairs. St. Paul was on a voyage from Vlissingen to Hull, Yorkshire.

=== 20 January ===
List of shipwrecks: 20 January 1819
Ship	State	Description
Fortune	Netherlands	The ship was driven ashore on Texel, North Holland. She was on a voyage from Amsterdam, North Holland to London, United Kingdom. Fortune was refloated on 12 February and taken in to a port on Texel for repairs.
Friends	United Kingdom	The ship was wrecked on a sandbank whilst on a voyage from Kirkcudbright to Whitehaven, Cumberland.
Friends Increase	United Kingdom	The ship was wrecked on the Goland Rocks, Sweden with the loss of her captain and several of her crew. She was on a voyage from Korsør, Denmark to London.

=== 21 January ===
List of shipwrecks: 21 January 1819
Ship	State	Description
Fame	United Kingdom	The sloop ran aground on the Foreness Rock, Margate, Kent. She was on a voyage from Dartmouth, Devon to London. She was refloated and resumed her voyage.
Juno	United Kingdom	The ship was wrecked off Lindisfarne, Northumberland with the loss of three of her six crew. She was on a voyage from Berwick-upon-Tweed, Northumberland to Hull, Yorkshire.

=== 22 January ===
List of shipwrecks: 22 January 1819
Ship	State	Description
Columbus	United Kingdom	The ship was driven ashore and wrecked at "Brumerskin", Argyllshire with the loss of four of her ten crew. She was on a voyage from the Clyde to Jamaica.
Fortune	United Kingdom	The ship ran aground on the Kentish Knock, in the North Sea and was abandoned. Her seventeen crew survived. She was on a voyage from Hull, Yorkshire to Jamaica. Wreckage from the ship washed up on Heligoland.
Nancy	United Kingdom	The ship was driven ashore in White Bay, County Cork. She was on a voyage from Cork to Whitehaven, Cumberland.
Peace & Plenty	United Kingdom	The ship was driven ashore near Wick, Caithness. She was on a voyage from London to Inverness.
Trelawney	United Kingdom	The ship was wrecked between Saltcoats and Irvine, Ayrshire with the loss of sixteen of the 21 people on board, and that of a boat full of rescuers. She was on a voyage from Greenock, Renfrewshire to Jamaica.

=== 23 January ===
List of shipwrecks: 23 January 1819
Ship	State	Description
Agenoria	United Kingdom	The ship sank at Bermuda. She was on a voyage from Dublin to New York, United States.
Sally	United Kingdom	The ship was driven ashore. She was on a voyage from Padstow, Cornwall to Newport, Monmouthshire. She was refloated and taken in to Minehead, Somerset.

=== 24 January ===
List of shipwrecks: 24 January 1819
Ship	State	Description
Berwickshire Packet	United Kingdom	The ship departed from Bristol, Gloucestershire for Cork. No further trace, presumed foundered with the loss of all hands.
Imperieuse	(United Kingdom of Great Britain and Ireland) Isle of Man	The ship was wrecked at Workington, Cumberland.
Prince of Orange	United Kingdom	The ship collided with Renewal ( United Kingdom) and was beached at Ramsgate, Kent. She was on a voyage from London to Ceylon. Prince of Orange was later refloated and taken in to Ramsgate.
Wolf's Cove	United Kingdom	The ship was driven ashore on Mauritius. She was later refloated.

=== 25 January ===
List of shipwrecks: 25 January 1819
Ship	State	Description
Abundance	United Kingdom	The brig was wrecked at "Collestown" with the loss of five of her crew.
Bole	France	The ship was driven ashore and wrecked at Port Louis, Mauritius.
Charles	France	The ship was wrecked on the Île de Ré, Finistère with some loss of life. She was on a voyage from Bordeaux, Gironde to Buenos Aires, Argentina.
Creole	(United Kingdom of the Netherlands) Netherlands East Indies	The ship was driven ashore on the "Île aux Tonneliers", Mauritius.
Eole	France	The ship was driven ashore near Point au Forge, Mauritius.
Friendship	United Kingdom	The ship was driven ashore at Catania, Sicily.
Hunter	United Kingdom	The brig was wrecked on the Sands of Forrie, Fife.
Jason	United Kingdom	The ship was driven ashore and wrecked at Port Louis.
Jeune Ferdinand	United Kingdom	The ship was driven ashore and wrecked at Port Louis.
Marchioness of Huntly	United Kingdom	The sloop was driven ashore and wrecked at Elie, Fife with the loss of three lives. She was on a voyage from Leith, Lothian to Aberdeen.
Petite Marie	France	The ship was driven ashore at Port Louis.
Vrouw Agatha	Netherlands	The ship was driven ashore at Point au Forge, Mauritius.
Wellington	United Kingdom	The ship sank at Port Louis.
Wolfe's Cove	United Kingdom	The ship was driven ashore and damaged on the Île aux Tonneliers. She was refloated some time later and sold as a hulk.

=== 26 January ===
List of shipwrecks: 26 January 1819
Ship	State	Description
Ann	United Kingdom	The ship was driven ashore at Littlehampton, Sussex. She was on a voyage from Greenock, Renfrewshire to Littlehampton. She was refloated on 8 February and taken in to Littlehampton.
Havanna Packet	United Kingdom	The ship was driven ashore and sank at the Point of Ayr, Flintshire. She was on a voyage from Havana, Cuba to Liverpool, Lancashire. Havanna Packet was refloated in early February and taken in to Liverpool by a steamboat.
Marchioness of Huntley	United Kingdom	The ship foundered in the Bristol Channel off Ely, Glamorgan with the loss of three lives.

=== 27 January ===
List of shipwrecks: 27 January 1819
Ship	State	Description
Emilie	France	The ship departed from Nantes, Loire-Inférieure for London, United Kingdom. No further trace, presumed foundered with the loss of all hands.
Lieven Castle	United Kingdom	The ship was driven ashore in the Belfast Lough. She was on a voyage from Glasgow, Renfrewshire to Belfast, County Antrim.
Providence	United Kingdom	The ship was wrecked on the East Hoyle Sandbank, in Liverpool Bay. Her crew were rescued. she was on a voyage from Liverpool, Lancashire to Southampton, Hampshire.

=== 28 January ===
List of shipwrecks: 28 January 1819
Ship	State	Description
Apollo	United Kingdom	The ship ran aground on the Herd Sand, in the North Sea off the coast of County Durham She was on a voyage from South Shields, County Durham to London. She was refloated and put back to South Shields.
Betsey	United Kingdom	The ship was wrecked on Newbiggin Point, Northumberland with the loss of all but one of her crew.
Bon Amis	France	The ship departed from Havre de Grâce, Seine-Inférieure for Senegal. No further trace, presumed foundered with the loss of all hands.
Borneo	United States	The 233-ton fur trading ship was wrecked during a gale near Cape Muzon in southeastern Russian America, becoming a total loss. Her crew survived, reached shore, and was rescued by the vessel Volunteer (Flag unknown) after escaping hostile Alaska Natives.
Cruiser	United Kingdom	The ship ran aground at Plymouth, Devon and was abandoned by her crew before she was wrecked. She was on a voyage from London to Plymouth.
Earnest	United Kingdom	The ship ran aground on the Haisborough Sands. She was consequently beached at Winterton-on-Sea, Norfolk where she was wrecked. Earnest was on a voyage from Hamburg to London.
Eliza & Mary	United Kingdom	The ship was driven ashore and wrecked near Carlingford, County Louth. She was on a voyage from Killough, County Down to Newry, County Antrim.
George	United Kingdom	The ship was driven ashore and severely damaged near Rock Ferry, Cheshire. She was on a voyage from Liverpool, Lancashire to Maranhão, Brazil
Mary	United Kingdom	The ship was driven ashore whilst on a voyage from Belfast, County Antrim to Drogheda, County Louth.
Medora	United States	The ship was driven ashore at Gibraltar. She was on a voyage from Philadelphia, Pennsylvania to Gibraltar. She was refloated.
Merchant	United Kingdom	The brig was driven ashore and damaged at Sandsend, Yorkshire. Her crew were rescued. She was on a voyage from Memel, Prussia to London. Merchant was refloated on 11 February and taken in to Whitby, Yorkshire.
Ocean	United Kingdom	The ship was driven ashore and severely damaged in Caernarvon Bay. She was on a voyage from St. Andrew, New Brunswick, British North America to Liverpool. Ocean was refloated the next day and taken in to Amlwch, Anglesey.
Ruby	United Kingdom	The collier was driven ashore at Blyth, Northumberland and was abandoned by her crew.

=== 29 January ===
List of shipwrecks: 29 January 1819
Ship	State	Description
Betsy	United Kingdom	The ship was driven ashore and wrecked at Newbiggin-by-the-Sea, Northumberland with the loss of all but one of her crew.
Cruizer	United Kingdom	The ship was driven ashore and wrecked near Poole, Dorset. She was on a voyage from London to Poole.
Oliver	France	The ship foundered off Land's End, Cornwall, United Kingdom. She was on a voyage from Bristol, Gloucestershire, United Kingdom to Rouen, Seine-Inférieure.
Voast	United Kingdom	The ship was driven ashore near Southwold, Suffolk. She was on a voyage from Harlingen, Friesland, Netherlands to London.

=== 30 January ===
List of shipwrecks: 30 January 1819
Ship	State	Description
Ann	United Kingdom	The ship was driven ashore in Red Bay, County Antrim. She was on a voyage from Liverpool, Lancashire to Londonderry.
Betsey	United Kingdom	The ship was dismasted in a squall off the Isles of Scilly. She was taken in tow by Lord Cathcart ( United Kingdom). The tow parted the next day and the ship was abandoned, her crew getting aboard Lord Cathcart. Betsey was on a voyage from Bristol, Gloucestershire to São Miguel, Azores, Portugal.
Four Sodskene	Denmark	The ship was driven ashore at North Berwick, Berwickshire, United Kingdom. She was on a voyage from Korsør to Newcastle-upon-Tyne, Northumberland, United Kingdom.
Lord Exmouth	United Kingdom	The ship was driven ashore on the "Island of Plain", in Alicante Bay, Spain. She was on a voyage from Genoa, Grand Duchy of Tuscany to London. She was refloated with assistance the next day.
William Pitt	United Kingdom	The ship was wrecked at "Enneshorn" or "Eveslane" Head, near Malin Head, County Donegal, Ireland, with the loss of all but one of her crew. She was on a voyage from Galway to Liverpool. Some reports have the loss on 27 January.

=== 31 January ===
List of shipwrecks: 31 January 1819
Ship	State	Description
Betsey	United Kingdom	The ship was abandoned in the Atlantic Ocean. She was on a voyage from Bristol, Gloucestershire to São Miguel Island, Azores. Betsey was taken in to Saint-Malo, Ille-et-Vilaine, France on 13 February.
Dolphin	Sweden	The ship was driven ashore 3 nautical miles (5.6 km) east of Calais, France. Her crew were rescued.
Oswin	United Kingdom	The ship was abandoned off the Cape of Good Hope, Cape Colony. All on board survived. She was on a voyage from Bengal, India to London.

=== Unknown date ===
List of shipwrecks: Unknown date in January 1819
Ship	State	Description
Amalie	Sweden	The ship was driven ashore on "Dagarot Island". She was on a voyage from Gothenburg to Stockholm
Berwickshire	United Kingdom	The ship foundered in the Irish Sea with some loss of life. She was on a voyage from Bristol, Gloucestershire to Cork.
Catch-me-if-you-can	United Kingdom	The schooner was driven ashore on "Church Beach". She was on a voyage from Newhaven, Sussex to "Haynnis". Catch-me-if-you-can was later refloated.
Catharine	Netherlands	The ship was driven ashore and wrecked on Texel, North Holland She was on a voyage from Amsterdam, North Holland to Bordeaux, Gironde, France.
Christian	United Kingdom	The ship was driven ashore on Texel, North Holland, Netherlands. She was refloated and taken in to Cuxhaven, where she arrived on 19 January in a leaky condition.
Drake	United Kingdom	The ship foundered in the North Sea off Southwold, Suffolk on or before 30 January.
Esperanza	Portugal	The ship foundered in the Atlantic Ocean. She was on a voyage from the Cape Verde Islands to the West Indies.
Fortune	United Kingdom	The ship was driven ashore and wrecked on Texel. She was on a voyage from London to Amsterdam.
Frau Wilhelmina	Netherlands	The ship was run down and sunk in the North Sea by an East Indiaman. She was on a voyage from London to Antwerp.
Friends	United Kingdom	The ship ran aground at Blankenese. She was on a voyage from Hull to Hamburg. She was refloated the next day and taken in to Hamburg.
Goodintent	(United Kingdom of Great Britain and Ireland) British North America	The schooner was lost off Cape Race, Newfoundland. She was on a voyage from St. John's, Newfoundland to Halifax, Nova Scotia.
Hero	United Kingdom	The ship was driven ashore on Scattery Island, County Clare. She was on a voyage from Limerick to Liverpool, Lancashire. She was refloated and put in to Kilrush, County Clare, where she arrived on 9 January.
Industry	United Kingdom	The ship was driven ashore near Fishguard, Pembrokeshire with the loss of all hands.
Isaac and Jane	United Kingdom	The ship was wrecked on the Bridges, Belfast, County Antrim. Her crew were rescued.
Jong Martha	Netherlands	The ship was driven ashore at Nieuwendam, North Holland. She was on a voyage from Bordeaux to Amsterdam.
Louisa	United Kingdom	The ship was lost in Dundrum Bay. She was on a voyage from Liverpool, Lancashire to Killough, County Down.
Maldon	United Kingdom	The sloop was driven ashore at Sandy Hook, New Jersey, United States. She was refloated on 19 January.
Margaretta	Netherlands	The ship was driven ashore on Texel. She was on a voyage from London to a Mediterranean port.
Marshland	United Kingdom	The ship was driven ashore and damaged at Harrington, Cumberland. She was on a voyage from Limerick to Liverpool. Marshland was later refloated.
Mary	United Kingdom United Kingdom	The ship was reported to have been wrecked at Lamlash, Isle of Arran with the loss of all hands. She was on a voyage from Sligo to Liverpool. She arrived at Liverpool on 2 February.
Mercurius	Netherlands	The ship was abandoned in the Norwegian Sea 20 leagues (60 nautical miles (110 km)) off Drontheim, Norway. She was on a voyage from Arkhangelsk, Russia to Amsterdam.
Messmate	United Kingdom	The ship was driven ashore in Dundrum Bay. She was on a voyage from Liverpool to Killough.
New Liberty	United Kingdom	The ship was driven ashore and wrecked at Pilling, Lancashire with the loss of all hands. She was on a voyage from Liverpool to Ulverston, Lancashire.
Radcliff	United Kingdom	The brig was driven ashore and wrecked at Cape St. George, Newfoundland, British North America. Her crew were rescued. She was on a voyage from Pictou, Nova Scotia, British North America to Liverpool.
Robert	United Kingdom	The ship was abandoned in the Atlantic Ocean. All on board were rescued by Warrington (United States). Robert was on a voyage from Liverpool to New York, United States.
Rudolph	Netherlands	The ship was lost near Callantsoog, North Holland. She was on a voyage from Riga, Russia to Amsterdam and Rotterdam, South Holland.
Triton	United Kingdom	The ship was driven ashore on Gotland. She was on a voyage from Rio de Janeiro, Brazil to Stockholm.
Victory	United Kingdom	The brig was wrecked near Fishguard, Pembrokeshire with the loss of all hands.
Wilhelmina	Netherlands	The brig was seized by eight of her crew, who murdered everyone else on board and scuttled her off Pedir, Netherlands East Indies.
Unnamed	United Kingdom	The sloop was driven ashore and damaged at Girvan, Ayrshire. She was on a voyage from Belfast to Liverpool.

== February ==
=== 1 February ===
List of shipwrecks: 1 February 1819
Ship	State	Description
Prince of Wales	United Kingdom	The ship was discovered at sea with only a dead crew member aboard. She was towed ashore at Cairnbulg, Aberdeenshire by a fishing boat. She was on a voyage from Gothenburg, Sweden to Dundalk, County Louth.
HMRC Speedwell	Board of Customs	The cutter was wrecked near Fraserburgh, Aberdeenshire. Her crew were rescued.

=== 2 February ===
List of shipwrecks: 2 February 1819
Ship	State	Description
Leitstern	Flag unknown	The ship sprang a leak and was abandoned in the Atlantic Ocean (43°12′N 11°08′W). She was on a voyage from Liverpool, Lancashire and Waterford, United Kingdom to Gibraltar.
Sjo Riddaren	Sweden	The ship was lost off Strömstadt.

=== 3 February ===
List of shipwrecks: 3 February 1819
Ship	State	Description
Lively	United Kingdom	The ship ran aground on the Gunfleet Sand, in the North Sea off Harwich, Essex. She was on a voyage from London to Dundee, Forfarshire. Lively was later refloated and taken in to Harwich.
Minerva	United Kingdom	The ship was driven ashore near Newry, County Antrim. She was on a voyage from Drontheim, Norway to Newry.

=== 4 February ===
List of shipwrecks: 4 February 1819
Ship	State	Description
George	United Kingdom	The ship ran aground off Neuwerk, Duchy of Schleswig. She was on a voyage from Hamburg to Hull, Yorkshire.
Shamrock	United Kingdom	The ship departed from Castletownshend, County Cork for Liverpool, Lancashire. No further trace, presumed foundered with the loss of all hands.

=== 5 February ===
List of shipwrecks: 5 February 1819
Ship	State	Description
Bonne Adelle	Spain	The ship was wrecked on the coast of East Florida, New Spain. She was on a voyage from Havana, Cuba to Cádiz.
Crisis	United Kingdom	The ship was driven ashore on the Cheshire shore of the River Mersey and severely damaged. She was on a voyage from Philadelphia, Pennsylvania to Liverpool, Lancashire. Crisis was refloated and arrived at Liverpool on 6 March.

=== 6 February ===
List of shipwrecks: 6 February 1819
Ship	State	Description
Golden Fleece	United Kingdom	The ship was driven ashore on Long Key, East Florida, New Spain. Her crew were rescued. She was on a voyage from Kingston, Jamaica to Liverpool, Lancashire.
James & Mary	United Kingdom	The brig was driven ashore at Cobh, County Cork. She was on a voyage from New Orleans, Louisiana to Liverpool. She was later refloated and taken in to Kinsale, County Cork.
Julia Ann	United Kingdom	The schooner was wrecked on Mahogany Island. Her crew were rescued. She was on a voyage from Saint John, New Brunswick, British North America to Boston, Massachusetts, United States.
Unnamed	United Kingdom	The sloop struck the Cole Rock and sank with the loss of all hands.

=== 7 February ===
List of shipwrecks: 7 February 1819
Ship	State	Description
Freundschaft	Stettin	The ship foundered off the Île de Ré, Charente-Maritime, France. Her crew were rescued. She was on a voyage from an English port to Nantes, Loire-Inférieure, France.
Iris	United Kingdom	The ship was wrecked on Solomon, or Candu Island. Her crew survived. She was on a voyage from London to Bombay, India.

=== 8 February ===
List of shipwrecks: 8 February 1819
Ship	State	Description
Malta	United Kingdom	The ship ran aground on the Sunk Sand, in the North Sea off the coast of Essex. She was on a voyage from London to Antwerp, Netherlands. She was refloated with the assistance of eight salvage smacks, and take in to Harwich, Essex the next day.
Plato	United States	The ship ran aground in the Weser. She was on a voyage from Baltimore, Maryland to Bremen.

=== 9 February ===
List of shipwrecks: 9 February 1819
Ship	State	Description
Pomona	United Kingdom	The ship was wrecked in Widewall Bay, Orkney Islands. Her crew were rescued. She was on a voyage from Troon, Ayrshire to Aberdeen.

=== 10 February ===
List of shipwrecks: 10 February 1819
Ship	State	Description
Mary	United States	The ship was driven ashore at Newport, Rhode Island. She was on a voyage from Havana, Cuba to Bristol, Rhode Island.

=== 11 February ===
List of shipwrecks: 11 February 1819
Ship	State	Description
Amphitrite	United Kingdom	The ship was wrecked in Barnstaple Bay near Bideford, Devon with the loss of all hands. She was on a voyage from São Miguel, Azores, Portugal to Bristol, Gloucestershire.

=== 12 February ===
List of shipwrecks: 12 February 1819
Ship	State	Description
Adolph & Aspasie	France	The ship was wrecked at Buenos Aires, Argentina.
Alexander Mansfield	United States	The ship ran aground on the Carrickfergus Bank. She was on a voyage from New York to Belfast, County Antrim, United Kingdom. She was refloated and taken in to Belfast.
Hero	United Kingdom	The ship was driven ashore at Spurn Point, Yorkshire. She was on a voyage from Hull, Yorkshire to Rio de Janeiro, Brazil. Hero was refloated on 23 February.
Lord Gardner	United Kingdom	The ship was wrecked on Lady Isle, Ayrshire. Her crew were rescued. She was on a voyage from New Brunswick, British North America to Ayr. She was later refloated.

=== 13 February ===
List of shipwrecks: 14 February 1819
Ship	State	Description
John	United Kingdom	The ship ran aground on the Barnard Sand, in the North Sea off the coast of Norfolk. She was on a voyage from Newcastle upon Tyne, Northumberland to Plymouth, Devon. She was refloated and taken in to Southwold, Suffolk in a leaky condition.

=== 14 February ===
List of shipwrecks: 14 February 1819
Ship	State	Description
Caledonia	United Kingdom	The ship was driven ashore at Coatham, Yorkshire. She was on a voyage from Sunderland, County Durham to Boston, Lincolnshire. She was refloated and resumed her voyage.
Elizabeth	United Kingdom	The ship ran aground on The Shingles, off the Isle of Wight. She was on a voyage from Sunderland, County Durham to Plymouth, Devon. She was refloated the next day and resumed her voyage.
Helen	United Kingdom	The schooner was driven ashore and wrecked south of Sunderland. Her crew were rescued by a coble. She was on a voyage from Boston, Lincolnshire to Sunderland.
Hylton	United Kingdom	The ship was wrecked on Scroby Sands, Norfolk.
Isabella	United Kingdom	The brig was driven ashore and wrecked on Spurn Point, Yorkshire.

=== 15 February ===
List of shipwrecks: 15 February 1819
Ship	State	Description
John and Catharine	United Kingdom	The sloop foundered off The Smalls. Her crew were rescued. She was on a voyage from Teignmouth, Devon to Glasgow, Renfrewshire.
Sarah & Eliza	United Kingdom	The ship was driven ashore at Stromness, Orkney Islands. She was on a voyage from Sligo to Stromness.
Success	United Kingdom	The sloop was lost at Grenada.

=== 16 February ===
List of shipwrecks: 16 February 1819
Ship	State	Description
Anne	United Kingdom	The ship was driven ashore near Kilmore, County Wexford. She was on a voyage from London to Dublin.
Anvil	United Kingdom	The ship was driven ashore and damaged at Newhaven, Sussex. Her crew were rescued. She was on a voyage from Sunderland, County Durham to Littlehampton, Sussex. She was refloated on 19 February and taken in to Newhaven.
Diligence	United Kingdom	The ship was driven ashore at Brighton, Sussex. She was refloated on 25 February and taken in to Newhaven, Sussex.
Johanna	Netherlands	The ship was wrecked at São Martinho do Porto, Portugal. She was on a voyage from Antwerp to St. Ubes, Portugal.
Platoff	United Kingdom	The ship was driven ashore at Brighton. She was refloated the next day and made for Dover, Kent.
William & Sally	United Kingdom	The ship was driven ashore at Brighton. She was refloated the next day and headed for Dover.

=== 17 February ===
List of shipwrecks: 17 February 1819
Ship	State	Description
Freier	United Kingdom	The ship was lost off "Schagerigg".
Isis	Flag unknown	The ship was wrecked on the Falsterbo Reef, off the coast of Sweden.

=== 18 February ===
List of shipwrecks: 18 February 1819
Ship	State	Description
Fanny	United Kingdom	The ship was lost near "Port Colonne", Mytilene, Greece. She was on a voyage from Smyrna, Ottoman Empire to Alexandria, Egypt.
Prince Frederick	United Kingdom	The ship was abandoned in the North Sea off Westkapelle, Zeeland, Netherlands. All on board were rescued by a Dutch fishing boat. She was on a voyage from Ostend, Netherlands to London.

=== 19 February ===
List of shipwrecks: 19 February 1819
Ship	State	Description
Amitie	France	The ship was driven ashore at the Point of Chauvean, Loire-Inférieure. She was on a voyage from Cartagena and Santa Martha to Nantes, Loire-Inférieure.

=== 20 February ===
List of shipwrecks: 20 February 1819
Ship	State	Description
Blake	United Kingdom	The sloop was driven ashore near Ravenglass, Cumberland. She was on a voyage from Bristol, Gloucestershire to Whitehaven, Cumberland.
William Leece	United Kingdom	The ship foundered in the Irish Sea off the Isle of Man with the loss of all hands. She was on a voyage from Lisbon, Portugal to Liverpool, Lancashire.

=== 21 February ===
List of shipwrecks: 21 February 1819
Ship	State	Description
Betsey	United Kingdom	The ship was driven ashore at the mouth of the River Tay. Her crew were rescued.
Commerce	United Kingdom	The ship was driven ashore north of Dunbar, Lothian. Her crew were rescued. She was on a voyage from Newcastle upon Tyne, Northumberland to Arbroath, Forfarshire.
Diligence	United Kingdom	The ship was damaged at Milford Haven, Pembrokeshire. She was on a voyage from Charlestown, Cornwall to Liverpool, Lancashire.
Friendship	United Kingdom	The ship was driven ashore and wrecked near Fishguard, Pembrokeshire.
Hilton	United Kingdom	The ship was wrecked on Scroby Sands, Norfolk.
Industry	United Kingdom	The brig was driven ashore and wrecked at Spurn Point, Yorkshire with the loss of all hands. Assistance from the Spurn Lifeboat was refused.
Industry	United Kingdom	The ship was wrecked on the Stoney Binks, in the North Sea off the coast of County Durham with the loss of all hands.
Isabella	United Kingdom	The brig was driven ashore and wrecked at Spurn Point. She was on a voyage from Sunderland, County Durham to Portsmouth, Hampshire.
Janet	United Kingdom	The ship was driven ashore at the mouth of the Tay with the loss of a crew member.
Levant	United Kingdom	The ship was driven ashore on the Newport Sands, Cardiganshire. She was on a voyage from Liverpool, Lancashire to Genoa, Kingdom of Sardinia and Livorno, Grand Duchy of Tuscany. Levant was refloated on 27 February and resumed her voyage.
Lion	United Kingdom	The ship was driven ashore near Fishguard.

=== 22 February ===
List of shipwrecks: 22 February 1819
Ship	State	Description
Adele	France	The ship was lost near Hellevoetsluis, South Holland, Netherlands. She was on a voyage from Havre de Grâce, Seine Maritime to Rotterdam, South Holland.
Concordia	Prussia	The ship was driven onto rocks at Guernsey, Channel Islands, where she was wrecked the next day. She was on a voyage from St. Ubes, Portugal to Liebau.
Courier	(United Kingdom of Great Britain and Ireland) Jersey	The ship struck a rock and sank 4 nautical miles (7.4 km) off Jersey. She was on a voyage from Rio de Janeiro, Brazil to Jersey. Courier was later refloated and taken in to Jersey in a severely damaged condition.
Princepe do Beira	Portugal	The ship was wrecked at Figueira da Foz. She was on a voyage from São Miguel Island, Azores to Figueira da Foz.
Providence	United Kingdom	The ship was driven ashore and sunk at Hubberstone Pill, Pembrokeshire. She was on a voyage from Cork to Bristol, Gloucestershire.

=== 23 February ===
List of shipwrecks: 23 February 1819
Ship	State	Description
Gipsey	United Kingdom	The ship was wrecked near Mockbeggar, Cheshire. She was on a voyage from Lisbon, Portugal to Liverpool, Lancashire.
John	United Kingdom	The ship was wrecked on the coast of Sicily. She was on a voyage from London to Malta.
Lord Hill	United Kingdom	The sloop was driven ashore and wrecked at Audresselles, Pas-de-Calais with the loss of all hands.
Ocean	United Kingdom	The ship partially capsized at Saint John, New Brunswick, British North America and was damaged.
Trois Amis	France	The ship was lost off Dunkerque, Nord. Her crew were rescued. She was on a voyage from Martinique to Dunkerque.
Unnamed	United Kingdom	The brig was driven ashore on the Puffin Sands.

=== 24 February ===
List of shipwrecks: 24 February 1819
Ship	State	Description
Neptune	United Kingdom	The ship was driven ashore at Lindisfarne, Northumberland. She was on a voyage from Leith, Lothian to Hull, Yorkshire.

=== 25 February ===
List of shipwrecks: 25 February 1819
Ship	State	Description
Isabella	United Kingdom	The ship was driven ashore on the Rednoses. She was on a voyage from Belfast, County Antrim to Liverpool, Lancashire. Isabella was refloated on 27 February and taken in to Liverpool.

=== 27 February ===
List of shipwrecks: 27 February 1819
Ship	State	Description
Mary	United Kingdom	The ship was driven ashore in the Cattewater. She was on a voyage from London to Malta. She was later refloated and resumed her voyage.
Unity	United Kingdom	The ship was driven ashore in the Tay. Her crew were rescued. She was on a voyage from Newcastle upon Tyne, Northumberland to Dundee, Forfarshire. Unity was later refloated and taken in to Dundee.
Wansbeck	United Kingdom	The ship was driven ashore at Scarborough, Yorkshire.

=== 28 February ===
List of shipwrecks: 28 February 1819
Ship	State	Description
Svyatoy Nikolay (Святой Николай, 'St. Nicholas') or Nikolay	Imperial Russian Navy	The transport ship ran aground and sprang a severe leak, and was then wrecked after a beaching attempt near Sevastopol, with the loss of three of her crew. She was on a voyage from Yevpatoria to Sevastopol.

=== Unknown date ===
List of shipwrecks: Unknown date in February 1819
Ship	State	Description
Ajax	United Kingdom	The ship was lost off Raasay, Orkney Islands with the loss of all hands. She was on a voyage from Saint John, New Brunswick, British North America to Aberdeen.
Bounty	United Kingdom	The ship was driven ashore at Castletown, Isle of Man. She was on a voyage from Strangford, County Antrim to Liverpool, Lancashire
Bridgewater	United Kingdom	The ship was lost in the Straits of Jubal.
Friends	United Kingdom	The ship was driven ashore at Pill, Somerset and severely damaged. She was on a voyage from Bideford, Devon to Bristol, Gloucestershire.
Gipsey	United Kingdom	The ship was driven ashore and wrecked at Mockbeggar, Cheshire. Her crew were rescued. She was on a voyage from Lisbon, Portugal to Liverpool.
Golden Fleece	United Kingdom	The ship was wrecked on Long Key before 6 February. Her crew were rescued. She was on a voyage from Jamaica to Liverpool.
Holkar	United States	The brig foundered off St. Domingo with the loss of three of theten people on board. She was on a voyage from Curaçao to New York.
Jeanie	(United Kingdom of Great Britain and Ireland) British North America	The brig was abandoned in the Atlantic Ocean. She was on a voyage from Prince Edward Island to Liverpool. Jeanie was later taken in to St. Mary's Bay, Nova Scotia.
Kaleidoscope	United States	The ship was wrecked at sea and was abandoned. She was on a voyage from Wilmington, Delaware to Bermuda.
Laura	United Kingdom	The ship sprang a leak sprang a leak in the Atlantic Ocean and was abandoned. All on board were rescued by Jerome and Triton (both United States). Laura was on a voyage from Rio de Janeiro, Brazil to London.
L'Olvier	France	The ship foundered in the Atlantic Ocean off Land's End, Cornwall, United Kingdom. Her crew were rescued. She was on a voyage from Bristol, Gloucestershire, United Kingdom to Rouen, Seine-Inférieure.
Messager	France	The ship was lost near the Île d'Oléron, Vendée in early February. She was on a voyage from New Orleans, Louisiana to L'Orient, Morbihan and Bordeaux, Gironde.
Neptune	United Kingdom	The ship was driven ashore and wrecked on Lindisfarne, Northumberland. She was on a voyage from Leith, Lothian to Hull, Yorkshire.
Sally	United Kingdom	The ship foundered in the Irish Sea off Kinsale, County Cork. Her crew were rescued. She was on a voyage from Newburyport, Massachusetts, United States to Liverpool, Lancashire.
Sally	United Kingdom	The ship was driven ashore at Calais, France. All on board were rescued.
Three Sisters	United States	The ship departed from Tappahannock, Virginia for Lisbon. No further trace, presumed foundered with the loss of all hands.
Triumfo pas Tres Nacoens	Portugal	The brig was abandoned in the Atlantic Ocean. She was later discovered and taken in to Porto Seguro, Brazil.

== March ==
=== 1 March ===
List of shipwrecks: 1 March 1819
Ship	State	Description
Alexy	Russia	The full-rigged ship was driven ashore at Gibraltar. She was refloated on 3 March.
Little Cherub	United Kingdom	The ship was driven ashore on Spurn Point, Yorkshire. She was on a voyage from Philadelphia, Pennsylvania, United States to Hull, Yorkshire.
Mariana	Portugal	The full-rigged ship was driven ashore at Gibraltar.
Montreal Packet	United Kingdom	The brig was driven ashore and damaged at Gibraltar.
North Star	(United Kingdom of Great Britain and Ireland) Gibraltar	The brig was driven ashore and damaged at Gibraltar.
San Joao Baptista	Portugal	The brig was driven ashore at Gibraltar. She was refloated the next day.
Snipe	United Kingdom	The brig was driven ashore and damaged at Gibraltar.
Supply	United Kingdom	The full-rigged ship was driven ashore and damaged at Gibraltar.
Trafalgar	(United Kingdom of Great Britain and Ireland) Gibraltar	The brig was driven ashore and damaged at Gibraltar.
Victoria	United Kingdom	The brig was driven into Victoria ( United Kingdom) and then driven ashore at Gibraltar in a damaged condition.

=== 2 March ===
List of shipwrecks: 2 March 1819
Ship	State	Description
Waterloo	United Kingdom	The ship arrived at Stromness, Orkney Islands from South Shields, County Durham in a leaky condition and was beached.

=== 3 March ===
List of shipwrecks: 3 March 1819
Ship	State	Description
Armstel	Flag unknown	The ship was driven ashore on Seconet Point. She was on a voyage from Havana, Cuba to Philadelphia, Pennsylvania, United States.
Delfino	Kingdom of Sardinia	The ship was wrecked on the Goodwin Sands, Kent, United Kingdom. She was on a voyage from Antwerp, Netherlands to Marseille, Bouches-du-Rhône, France and Genoa.
Eleanor	United Kingdom	The ship foundered in the North Sea off Great Yarmouth, Norfolk, with the loss of all hands.
Huntley	United Kingdom	The ship ran aground on the Gunfleet Sand, in the North Sea off the coast of Essex and was damaged. Her crew were rescued. She was on a voyage from Sunderland, County Durham to London. Huntley was later refloated and taken in to the River Colne, Essex.
Independence	United Kingdom	The ship was driven ashore on Great Cumbrae, Ayrshire. She was on a voyage from Charleston, South Carolina, United States to Greenock, Renfrewshire.
Moira	United Kingdom	The sloop was driven ashore at Landport, Gibraltar.
Penguin	United States	The brig was driven ashore at Landport, Gibraltar.
Selina	United Kingdom	The ship was lost off Deal, Kent.
Velociferes	France	The ship was driven ashore at the mouth of the River Cuckmere. She was on a voyage from Havre de Grâce, Seine-Inférieure to Dunkerque, Nord. Velociferes was later refloated and taken in to Newhaven, Sussex, United Kingdom.

=== 4 March ===
List of shipwrecks: 4 March 1819
Ship	State	Description
Augusta Frederica	Rostock	The ship ran aground at St. Ives, Cornwall, United Kingdom. She was on a voyage from Rostock to Liverpool, Lancashire, United Kingdom.
David & Jean	United Kingdom	The ship struck the Carr Rock, in the North Sea off the coast of Berwickshire and sank. Her crew were rescued. She was on a voyage from Dundee, Forfarshire to Rotterdam, South Holland, Netherlands.
Liverpool Packet	United Kingdom	The ship ran aground on the Burbo Bank, in Liverpool Bay. She was on a voyage from Savannah, Georgia, United States to Liverpool.

=== 5 March ===
List of shipwrecks: 5 March 1819
Ship	State	Description
George	United Kingdom	The sloop was driven ashore near Saint-Vaast-la-Hougue, Manche, France. Her crew were rescued. She was on a voyage from Falmouth, Cornwall to London.

=== 7 March ===
List of shipwrecks: 7 March 1819
Ship	State	Description
Aimee	France	The ship ran aground on the Gunfleet Sand, in the North Sea off the coast of Essex, United Kingdom. She was on a voyage from Sunderland, County Durham to Dunkerque, Nord. Aimee was later refloated and taken in to Harwich, Essex.
Christine	Sweden	The ship was driven ashore near Skagen, Denmark. She was on a voyage from Cádiz, Spain to Gothenburg.
Commerce	United Kingdom	The collier ran aground on the Cockle Sand, in the North Sea off the coast of Norfolk and sank.
Sophie	France	The ship was driven ashore and wrecked near Honfleur, Calvados/ She was on a voyage from London, United Kingdom to Rouen, Seine-Inférieure.

=== 9 March ===
List of shipwrecks: 9 March 1819
Ship	State	Description
Louisa	Lübeck	The ship was wrecked at Memel, Prussia with the loss of all on board. She was on a voyage from Lübeck to Memel.

=== 11 March ===
List of shipwrecks: 11 March 1819
Ship	State	Description
Dolphin	United States	The ship capsized in the Atlantic Ocean and was abandoned. She was on a voyage from Wilmington, Delaware to Bermuda.

=== 13 March ===
List of shipwrecks: 13 March 1819
Ship	State	Description
Benjamin	United Kingdom	The ship was wrecked at Skagen, Denmark. Her crew were rescued. She was on a voyage from Newcastle upon Tyne, Northumberland to Copenhagen, Denmark.

=== 14 March ===
List of shipwrecks: 14 March 1819
Ship	State	Description
Harboard	United Kingdom	The ship was wrecked at Skagen, Denmark with the loss of all but three of her crew. She was on a voyage from Newcastle upon Tyne, Northumberland to Copenhagen, Denmark.

=== 15 March ===
List of shipwrecks: 15 March 1819
Ship	State	Description
Altezara	United States	The sloop was lost near the Hole-in-the-Wall, Abaco Islands.

=== 17 March ===
List of shipwrecks: 17 March 1819
Ship	State	Description
Ann	United Kingdom	The ship was driven ashore and sank at Staithes, Yorkshire. Ann was refloated on 27 March and taken in to Whitby, Yorkshire.
Charlotte	United Kingdom	The ship was wrecked at São Miguel Island, Azores.
Christina	Netherlands	The ship was driven ashore in the Weser.
Davanah	United Kingdom	The sloop sprang a leak and was abandoned in the North Sea off Whitby. She subsequently came ashore at Whitby.
Goede Hoop	Netherlands	The ship was driven ashore at "Frederickzyl".
Jupiter	France	The ship was driven ashore on the Isle of Wight, United Kingdom. She was on a voyage from Bordeaux, Gironde to Boulogne, Pas-de-Calais.
Leeds	United Kingdom	The ship was driven ashore on Sylt, Duchy of Holstein with the loss of two of her crew. She was on a voyage from Hull, Yorkshire to Hamburg.
Neptune	United Kingdom	The ship was driven ashore in Bighouse Bay, Caithness. She was on a voyage from Workington, Cumberland to Trondheim, Norway.
Three Gebroders	Netherlands	The ship was lost off Uithuizen, Groningen. Her crew were rescued. She was on a voyage from Bremen to Amsterdam, North Holland.

=== 18 March ===
List of shipwrecks: 18 March 1819
Ship	State	Description
Aurora	United Kingdom	The ship was wrecked on Skagen, Denmark with the loss of eight lives. She was on a voyage from Sunderland, County Durham to Riga, Russia.
Carl Hendrick	(Sweden) Swedish Wismar	The ship was driven ashore near "Torriko". She was on a voyage from Wismar to Leith, Lothian, United Kingdom.
Vrow Engelina	Netherlands	The ship was driven ashore at Audresselles, Pas-de-Calais, France. She was on a voyage from Bordeaux, Gironde, France to Rotterdam, South Holland.

=== 19 March ===
List of shipwrecks: 19 March 1819
Ship	State	Description
Betsey	United Kingdom	The ship was driven ashore at Braunton, Devon. Her crew were rescued. She was on a voyage from Portsmouth, Hampshire to Cardiff, Glamorgan.
Catarina	Bremen	The ship was driven ashore at Bremen.
Eliza Dorothea	United Kingdom	The ship was driven ashore at Bremen.
Frederick Augustus	Bremen	The ship was driven ashore at Bremen.
Friends	United Kingdom	The ship was driven ashore at Fishguard, Pembrokeshire. She was on a voyage from Dublin to Swansea, Glamorgan.
Mercury	United Kingdom	The ship was driven ashore at Fishguard. She was on a voyage from Chepstow, Monmouthshire to Cork.
North Star	United Kingdom	The ship was driven ashore on the Dutchman's Bank, in the Irish Sea off Beaumaris, Anglesey. All on board were rescued by HMRC Success ( Board of Customs) and a pilot boat. She was on a voyage from Dumfries to Gibraltar. North Star was later refloated and taken in to Beaumaris.

=== 20 March ===
List of shipwrecks: 20 March 1819
Ship	State	Description
Diligence	United Kingdom	The sloop was driven ashore and wrecked at Ackergill, Caithness. Her crew were rescued. She was on a voyage from Peterhead, Aberdeenshire to Easdale, Argyllshire.
Mary	United Kingdom	The sloop was wrecked on the Western Rocks within the Isles of Scilly while carrying oats from Youghall, County Cork to Southampton, Hampshire. Her crew were rescued.
Ocean	United Kingdom	The ship was driven ashore on the Lavan Sand, in the Irish Sea off Beaumaris, Anglesey. She was on a voyage from Irvine, Ayrshire to Dublin.
Silvia	United Kingdom	The ship was wrecked on the Salthammar Reef, in the Baltic Sea off Bornholm, Denmark. She was on a voyage from Danzig, to London.
Sir Thomas Hardy	(United Kingdom of Great Britain and Ireland) British North America	The schooner was wrecked on Cape Negro, Nova Scotia with the loss of all but one of her crew. She was on a voyage from Trinidad to New Brunswick.
Venus	United Kingdom	The ship was wrecked on "Refnæs". She was on a voyage from Newcastle upon Tyne to Kiel, Duchy of Holstein.

=== 21 March ===
List of shipwrecks: 21 March 1819
Ship	State	Description
Lotte	Danzig	The ship was lost near Ringkøbing, Denmark. She was on a voyage from London, United Kingdom to Danzig
Vrow Jantina	Duchy of Holstein	The ship was lost in the Eider.

=== 22 March ===
List of shipwrecks: 22 March 1819
Ship	State	Description
Peggy & Helen	United Kingdom	The ship struck a rock off the Copeland Islands, County Down and foundered. Her crew were rescued. She was on a voyage from Sligo to Liverpool, Lancashire.

=== 23 March ===
List of shipwrecks: 23 March 1819
Ship	State	Description
Nelly	United Kingdom	The ship was destroyed by fire at Aberdeen.

=== 24 March ===
List of shipwrecks: 24 March 1819
Ship	State	Description
Dumbuck	United Kingdom	The ship departed from Sligo for Greenock, Renfrewshire. No further trace, presumed foundered in the Irish Sea with the loss of all hands.
Paragon	United Kingdom	The full-rigged ship was driven ashore and sank at Saugor, India with the loss of a crew member. She was on a voyage from London to the Cape of Good Hope, Cape Colony and Bengal, India.
Sheepfold	United Kingdom	The ship was run down and sunk in the North Sea off Aberdeen by Prince of Wales ( United Kingdom).
William Dickenson	United Kingdom	The ship foundered at the north end of the Long Bank, in the North Sea. Her crew were rescued. She was on a voyage from South Shields, County Durham to Christiansand, Norway.

=== 25 March ===
List of shipwrecks: 25 March 1819
Ship	State	Description
Prescott	United Kingdom	The whaler was driven ashore near Lerwick, Shetland Islands and damaged. She was on a voyage from Hull, Yorkshire to the Davis Straits. Prescott was later refloated and taken in to Lerwick in a waterlogged condition.
Sir George Beckwith	(United Kingdom of Great Britain and Ireland) Barbados	The ship was driven ashore in St. Mary's Bay, Nova Scotia, British North America with the loss of two of her crew. She was on a voyage from Barbados to Saint John, New Brunswick, British North America.

=== 26 March ===
List of shipwrecks: 26 March 1819
Ship	State	Description
Pilger	Stettin	The ship was lost on Skagen, Denmark. She was on a voyage from Stettin to London, United Kingdom.

=== 27 March ===
List of shipwrecks: 27 March 1819
Ship	State	Description
Formica	France	The ship was wrecked on the Goodwin Sands, Kent, United Kingdom. she was on a voyage from Brest, Finistère to Drammen, Norway.
Frau Margaretha	Duchy of Holstein	The ship ran aground in the Eider. She was on a voyage from Tönning to London, United Kingdom. She was refloated and put back to Tönning in a sinking condition.

=== 28 March ===
List of shipwrecks: 28 March 1819
Ship	State	Description
HNLMS Admiraal Eversten	Netherlands Navy	The man of war was severely damaged in the South Atlantic by a hurricane. She was abandoned 5 leagues (15 nautical miles (28 km)) off Diego Garcia on 9 April and subsequently was destroyed by fire. Her crew were rescued by the brig Pickering (United States).
Earl of Strathmore	United Kingdom	The ship was driven ashore at Great Yarmouth, Norfolk. She was on a voyage from Sunderland, County Durham to Dover, Kent. Earl of Strathmore later refloated.
Fairfield	United Kingdom	The ship was wrecked on Attwoods Key. Her crew survived. She was on a voyage from Aux Cayes, Haiti to Liverpool, Lancashire.
Herzog von Cambridge	Kingdom of Hanover	The ship was wrecked at Wrango, Sweden. Her crew were rescued.

=== 29 March ===
List of shipwrecks: 29 March 1819
Ship	State	Description
Carl Edward	Stettin	The ship was driven ashore near Lemvig, Denmark. She was on a voyage from London, United Kingdom to Stettin.
Grao Cruz	United Kingdom	The ship was driven ashore and wrecked in a hurricane at Mauritius.
Francis Henrietta	Netherlands	The ship was driven ashore in a hurricane at Mauritius.
Jenny	United Kingdom	The schooner was driven ashore and sank in a hurricane on Tonnelin Island.
Josephine	France	The ship sank in a hurricane at Mauritius.
Juno	Netherlands	The ship was driven ashore and wrecked in a hurricane at Mauritius.
Rapide	United Kingdom	The full-rigged ship was driven ashore in a hurricane at Mauritius.
Thetis	United Kingdom	The ship was driven ashore in a hurricane at Mauritius.

=== 31 March ===
List of shipwrecks: 31 March 1819
Ship	State	Description
Martha & Bowrina	Netherlands	The ship struck the Kentish Knock and foundered. She was on a voyage from Amsterdam, North Holland to Bordeaux, Gironde, France.
Peterel	(United Kingdom of Great Britain and Ireland) Grenada	The drogher was lost at Grenada.
Prudence	Portugal	The schooner sprang a leak and put into the River Shannon, where she sank. She was on a voyage from St. Ubes, Portugal to Limerick, United Kingdom.
Three Sisters	United Kingdom	The ship ran aground at Weymouth, Dorset. She was on a voyage from Sunderland, County Durham to Weymouth. She was refloated and taken in to Weymouth in a leaky condition.
William	United Kingdom	The schooner was wrecked at Spry Harbour, Nova Scotia, British North America with the loss of a crew member. She was on a voyage from Philadelphia, Pennsylvania, United States to Halifax, Nova Scotia.

=== Unknown date ===
List of shipwrecks: Unknown date in March 1819
Ship	State	Description
Alexander	United Kingdom	The brig was wrecked on the Buxey Sand, in the North Sea off the coast of Essex. Her crew were rescued.
Alexander	Lübeck	The ship was driven ashore near Dragør, Denmark. She was on a voyage from Lübeck to Oporto, Portugal. She was refloated and taken in to Copenhagen, Denmark, where she arrived on 24 March in a leaky condition.
Baltic	Prussia	The ship was wrecked on "Wederoe" with the loss of all but two of her crew. She was on a voyage from Newcastle upon Tyne, Northumberland, United Kingdom to Memel.
Belvoir Castle	United Kingdom	The ship capsized in the River Shannon. She was on a voyage from Limerick to Liverpool, Lancashire. Belvoir Castle was later refloated.
Betsey	United Kingdom	The ship was driven ashore near Whitby, Yorkshire.
Celesti	Spain	Atlantic slave trade: The Guineaman was wrecked on the west coast of Grand Bahama, Bahamas. Some of her crew were rescued by Sally ( United Kingdom). Her 170 slaves were take aboard the privateer Hornet (United States).
Coreo	United Kingdom	The ship ran aground on the English Bank and was abandoned by her crew. She was on a voyage from Rio de Janeiro, Brazil to Buenos Aires, Argentina. Coreo later floated off and came ashore on the mainland.
Dasher	United Kingdom	The ship was lost whilst on a voyage from Aruba to Jamaica.
Eliza	United Kingdom	The ship caught fire in the North Sea off the coast of Northumberland and put into Lindisfarne, where her crew were reported to have suffocated and the ship was destroyed. Eliza was on a voyage from Sunderland, County Durham to Aberdeen.
Hannah	United Kingdom	The ship was wrecked on the Haisborough Sands, in the North Sea off the coast of Norfolk.
Hannah	(United Kingdom of Great Britain and Ireland) Grenada	The drogher was driven ashore and wrecked at Grenada.
Harriet	United Kingdom	The ship ran aground on the Domesnes Reef, in the North Sea off the coast of Norway in mid-March. She was on a voyage from Newcastle upon Tyne, Northumberland to Riga, Russia.
Hartley	United Kingdom	The brig was wrecked in the North Sea off the coast of Essex. Her crew were rescued by Good Intent ( United Kingdom).
Henry	France	The brig-polacca was abandoned in the Mediterranean Sea. She was on a voyage from Marseille, Bouches-du-Rhône to Gibraltar. Henry was later taken in to Alicante, Spain by some fishermen.
Henry & Mary	United Kingdom	The ship struck the pier and sank at Whitby, Yorkshire with the loss a crew member. She was on a voyage from Sunderland, County Durham to Whitby.
Industry	United Kingdom	The ship was wrecked at São Miguel Island, Azores.
James	United Kingdom	The ship was abandoned in the Atlantic Ocean. Her crew survived. She was on a voyage from Liverpool, Lancashire to Halifax, Nova Scotia, British North America.
Jane	United Kingdom	The ship was driven ashore and wrecked at Great Yarmouth. She was on a voyage from Viborg, Denmark to Bristol, Gloucestershire.
John & William	United Kingdom	The ship foundered in the Atlantic Ocean. Her crew were rescued. She was on a voyage from Bristol to São Miguel Island, Azores.
Mary	United Kingdom	The ship was lost whilst on a voyage from Port Ballantrae, County Antrim to Liverpool. Her crew were rescued.
Pearl	United Kingdom	The ship was lost whilst on a voyage from Limerick to Liverpool.
Santa Maria	Portugal	The ship was driven ashore and wrecked at Beaufort, South Carolina, United States. She was on a voyage from Pernambuco, Brazil to Lisbon. Santa Maria had been captured on 6 January by one of Artigas's privateers.
Sir Thomas Graham	United Kingdom	The ship was wrecked on the Jardines. She was on a voyage from Jamaica to Cuba.
Stathi	Ottoman Empire	The ship was driven ashore on Mytilene. She was on a voyage from Salonica, Greece to Smyrna.
Trinita	Malta	The bombard was scuttled at Malta in late March following a voyage from Susa, Tripolitania as three of her crew had died from the plague.

== April ==
=== 1 April ===
List of shipwrecks: 1 April 1819
Ship	State	Description
Hewson	United Kingdom	The ship ran aground near Rønne, Denmark. She was on a voyage from London to Danzig.
Mercury	United Kingdom	The ship was wrecked near Milford Haven, Pembrokeshire. Her crew were rescued. She was on a voyage from Teignmouth, Devon to Liverpool, Lancashire.
Nancy	United Kingdom	The ship was driven ashore on the north coast of Papa Westray, Orkney Islands. Her crew were rescued. She was on a voyage from South Shields, County Durham to an American port.

=== 2 April ===
List of shipwrecks: 2 April 1819
Ship	State	Description
Elizabeth Eleanor	Netherlands	The ship was wrecked on the Caicos Reef. She was on a voyage from Antwerp to Havana, Cuba.
Freedom	United Kingdom	The ship was driven ashore at Southport, Lancashire. She was on a voyage from Dublin to Liverpool, Lancashire.
Standard	United Kingdom	The sloop was driven ashore in Buff Bay, Jamaica.

=== 3 April ===
List of shipwrecks: 3 April 1819
Ship	State	Description
Charles Hamilton	United Kingdom	The ship ran aground on the Kentish Knock. She was on a voyage from Hull, Yorkshire to Lisbon, Portugal.
Confidence	Sweden	The ship was lost near Landskrona. She was on a voyage from Landskrona to Stockholm.
Pallas	United Kingdom	The ship was driven ashore near Kingsdown, Kent. She was on a voyage from London to Liverpool, Lancashire. She was refloated.

=== 6 April ===
List of shipwrecks: 6 April 1819
Ship	State	Description
Fanny	United Kingdom	The ship was driven ashore at Sandy Hook, New Jersey, United States. She was on a voyage from Greenock, Renfrewshire to New York. Fanny was refloated on 10 April.

=== 7 April ===
List of shipwrecks: 7 April 1819
Ship	State	Description
Ocean	United Kingdom	The ship was discovered in the Atlantic Ocean (43°09′N 51°46′W) waterlogged and abandoned. She was on a voyage from Saint John, New Brunswick, British North America to Liverpool, Lancashire.

=== 9 April ===
List of shipwrecks: 9 April 1819
Ship	State	Description
Fortuna	United Kingdom	The ship ran aground on the Goodwin Sands, Kent and was wrecked. Her crew were rescued. She was on a voyage from South Shields, County Durham to Topsham, Devon.

=== 10 April ===
List of shipwrecks: 10 April 1819
Ship	State	Description
Hewson	United Kingdom	The ship was driven ashore on the north coast of Bornholm, Denmark. She was on a voyage from London to a Baltic port.

=== 12 April ===
List of shipwrecks: 12 April 1819
Ship	State	Description
Myrtle	United States	The schooner was discovered waterlogged and abandoned in the Atlantic Ocean (39°07′N 55°30′W) by Alfred ( United Kingdom).

=== 13 April ===
List of shipwrecks: 13 April 1819
Ship	State	Description
Paragon	United Kingdom	The ship was wrecked on the Saugor Sand with the loss of one life.

=== 15 April ===
List of shipwrecks: 15 April 1819
Ship	State	Description
Ariadne	Bremen	The galiot was in collision with Venus (Netherlands) south of the Isles of Scilly, United Kingdom and was abandoned. She was on a voyage from Bordeaux, Gironde, France to Bremen. Ariadne was towed on to Falmouth, Cornwall on 19 April by HMRC Alert and HMRC Hind (both Board of Customs).

=== 16 April ===
List of shipwrecks: 16 April 1819
Ship	State	Description
Brothers	United Kingdom	The brig ran aground on the Goodwin Sands, Kent. She was refloated with assistance and taken in to Ramsgate, Kent.

=== 18 April ===
List of shipwrecks: 18 April 1819
Ship	State	Description
Mentor	Sweden	The ship struck a rock between Wingo and Marstrand and was severely damaged. She was on a voyage from Larne, County Antrim, United Kingdom to Gothenburg. She was refloated with the assistance of divers.
Swiftsure	United States	The ship was driven ashore on Eierland, North Holland, Netherlands. She was on a voyage from Boston, Massachusetts, to Hamburg.

=== 19 April ===
List of shipwrecks: 19 April 1819
Ship	State	Description
Camilla	United Kingdom	The ship was sunk by ice off Cape Breton Island, Nova Scotia, British North America. She was on a voyage from Lisbon, Portugal to Quebec City, Lower Canada, British North America.

=== 21 April ===
List of shipwrecks: 21 April 1819
Ship	State	Description
Abeona	United Kingdom	The brig was driven ashore and wrecked at Scremerston, Northumberland. Her crew were rescued. She was on a voyage from Danzig to Grangemouth, Stirlingshire.
Active	United Kingdom	The ship was driven ashore and wrecked south of Whitby, Yorkshire with the loss of four lives.
Agnetha Dorothea	Flag unknown	The galiot was wrecked on the Partonsteel and driven ashore on Lindisfarne, Northumberland, United Kingdom with the loss of all hands.
New Greenwich	United Kingdom	The sloop was driven ashore at Sunderland, County Durham.
Trim	United Kingdom	The sloop was driven ashore and wrecked at Goswick, Northumberland. Her crew were rescued. She was on a voyage from Cromarty to London.

=== 22 April ===
List of shipwrecks: 22 April 1819
Ship	State	Description
Constantia	United Kingdom	The ship was driven ashore on Ginger Key. She was on a voyage from Port-au-Prince, Haiti to Havre de Grâce, Seine-Inférieure, France.
Nancy	United Kingdom	The ship was wrecked near Milford Haven, Pembrokeshire. Her crew were rescued. She was on a voyage from Newport, Monmouthshire to Belfast, County Antrim.

=== 23 April ===
List of shipwrecks: 23 April 1819
Ship	State	Description
Diligence	United Kingdom	The ship ran aground on the Haisborough Sands, in the North Sea off the coast of Norfolk. She was refloated but consequently sank. Her crew were rescued by Jane ( United Kingdom).
Maria	United Kingdom	The ship collided with another vessel whilst entering Hayle, Cornwall and sank. She was on a voyage from Newport, Monmouthshire to London.
Nancy	United Kingdom	The sloop was lost off The Crow, in the Bristol Channel. Her crew were rescued. She was on a voyage from Newry, County Antrim to Chepstow, Monmouthshire.
Thorn	United Kingdom	The ship was on her beam ends at Barbados. She was righted and saved by the efforts of the master of Pusey Hall ( United Kingdom).
Unity	United Kingdom	The sloop foundered in the Bristol Channel 5 leagues (15 nautical miles (28 km)) north of Lundy Island, Devon. Her crew were rescued. She was on a voyage from Fowey, Cornwall to Llanelli, Glamorgan.

=== 24 April ===
List of shipwrecks: 24 April 1819
Ship	State	Description
Ann	United Kingdom	The ship was driven ashore by ice in the Gulf of Saint Lawrence.
Bon Accord	United Kingdom	The whaler struck ice in the Atlantic Ocean and was severely damaged, becoming waterlogged. She was taken in to a port in May and repaired.
Caledonia	United Kingdom	The ship was sunk by ice in the Gulf of Saint Lawrence.
Ceres	United Kingdom	The ship was sunk by ice in Miramichi Bay.
Heart of Oak	United Kingdom	The ship was crushed by ice and sunk in the Gulf of Saint Lawrence. Her crew were rescued. She was on a voyage from London to Quebec City, Lower Canada, British North America.
Henry	United Kingdom	The ship was driven ashore by ice in the Gulf of Saint Lawrence.
Latona	United Kingdom	The ship was severely damaged by ice in the Gulf of Saint Lawrence.
Monarch	United Kingdom	The ship was driven ashore by ice in the Gulf of Saint Lawrence. She was later refloated.
Sarah	United Kingdom	The ship was sunk by ice in the Gulf of Saint Lawrence.
William & Ann	United Kingdom	The ship was sunk by ice in the Gulf of Saint Lawrence.

=== 25 April ===
List of shipwrecks: 25 April 1819
Ship	State	Description
Alexander	United Kingdom	The brig was wrecked in the Magdalen Islands, Lower Canada, British North America. She was on a voyage from Newcastle upon Tyne, Northumberland to Miramichi, New Brunswick, British North America.
Carl Albert	Stettin	The ship was driven ashore and wrecked near Cromer, Norfolk United Kingdom. She was on a voyage from Stettin to London, United Kingdom.
Friends	United Kingdom	The ship foundered in the Irish Sea off Bray, County Wicklow with the loss of three of her crew. She was on a voyage from Liverpool, Lancashire to Dublin.
Prospert	France	The ship was lost at Saint-Lô, Manche with the loss of her captain. She was on a voyage from Portsmouth, Hampshire, United Kingdom to Cherbourg, Seine-Inférieure.

=== 26 April ===
List of shipwrecks: 26 April 1819
Ship	State	Description
Francis	United Kingdom	The ship was wrecked on the Sandhammer Reef, off the coast of Norway. Her crew were rescued. She was on a voyage from Memel, Prussia to London.

=== 27 April ===
List of shipwrecks: 27 April 1819
Ship	State	Description
Barton	United Kingdom	The ship was driven ashore and wrecked in the Sierra Leone River.
Lord Niddery	United Kingdom	The ship struck the Brazil Rock, off Cape Sable Island, Nova Scotia, British North America and foundered. Her crew took to the boats and were rescued the next day by Mars ( United Kingdom). Lord Niddery was on a voyage from South Shields, County Durham to Saint John, New Brunswick, British North America.

=== 28 April ===
List of shipwrecks: 28 April 1819
Ship	State	Description
Ann	United Kingdom	The ship was abandoned in the Gulf of Saint Lawrence.
Caledonia	United Kingdom	The ship was crushed by ice and sunk in the Gulf of Saint Lawrence.
Henry	United Kingdom	The ship was driven ashore in the Gulf of Saint Lawrence.
Latone	United Kingdom	The ship was severely damaged by ice in the Gulf of Saint Lawrence.
Sarah	United Kingdom	The ship was crushed by ice and sunk in the Gulf of Saint Lawrence.
William and Ann	United Kingdom	The ship was crushed by ice and sunk in the Gulf of Saint Lawrence.

=== 30 April ===
List of shipwrecks: 30 April 1819
Ship	State	Description
Neptune	United Kingdom	The ship was driven ashore and damaged at Wylfa, Anglesey. She was on a voyage from Ipswich, Suffolk to Liverpool, Lancashire. Neptune was later refloated and taken in to Cemaes Bay.
Naomi	United Kingdom	The ship foundered in Dingle Bay with the loss of all hands. She was on a voyage from Milltown, Dublin to Liverpool.
Sampson	United Kingdom	The ship departed from Falmouth, Cornwall for Maranhão, Brazil. No further trace, presumed foundered with the loss of all hands.

=== Unknown date ===
List of shipwrecks: Unknown in April date 1819
Ship	State	Description
Ann Maria	United States	The schooner collided with a whale in the Atlantic Ocean (17°14′N 27°00′W) and was damaged. She was on a voyage from Gibraltar to Pará, Brazil. Ann Maria was beached on arrival and declared a total loss.
Beaufoy	United Kingdom	The packet ship was wrecked.
Kate	United Kingdom	The ship was wrecked near Leith, Lothian. She was on a voyage from Saint Petersburg, Russia to Bristol, Gloucestershire.
Neptune	United Kingdom	The ship was lost near Tobermory, Isle of Mull. She was on a voyage from Easdale, Argyllshire to Inverness.
Princess Charlotte	United Kingdom	The ship was wrecked on the Hogsty Reef in early April. All on board were rescued. She was on a voyage from Jamaica to Falmouth, Cornwall.
Sheepfold	United Kingdom	The schooner foundered in the North Sea off Aberdeen.
Violet	United Kingdom	The ship foundered in the North Sea. She was on a voyage from South Shields, County Durham to Memel, Prussia.
Unnamed	United Kingdom	The fishing smack was wrecked with the loss of all nine hands.

== May ==
=== 3 May ===
List of shipwrecks: 3 May 1819
Ship	State	Description
Commerce	United Kingdom	The ship was destroyed by fire at Coringa, India. Her crew were rescued.
London	United Kingdom	The ship was driven ashore on Fox Island, British North America. She was on a voyage from Liverpool, Lancashire to Miramichi, New Brunswick, British North America.

=== 5 May ===
List of shipwrecks: 5 May 1819
Ship	State	Description
Delta	(United Kingdom of Great Britain and Ireland) Saint Vincent	The schooner was wrecked on the coast of Saint Vincent. Her crew were rescued.

=== 7 May ===
List of shipwrecks: 7 May 1819
Ship	State	Description
Kherson (Херсон)	Imperial Russian Navy	The transport ship capsized and sank in the Dnieper at Kherson with the loss of three lives. There was an extra contingent of 110 workers on the deck and the capsize was caused by panicked people running to the port side when the ship leaned heavily starboard from a wind gust. Subsequently refloated, repaired and returned to service.

=== 9 May ===
List of shipwrecks: 9 May 1819
Ship	State	Description
Drie Vrienden	Netherlands	The ship was taken over by three of her crew off "St. George D'Elimina", Africa. Three crew were murdered and the ship was blown up. She was on a voyage from Pernambuco, Brazil to Africa and Amsterdam, North Holland.

=== 10 May ===
List of shipwrecks: 10 May 1819
Ship	State	Description
Nostra Señora da Guia	Spain	The ship was driven ashore and wrecked at the Cape of Good Hope, Cape Colony.

=== 13 May ===
List of shipwrecks: 13 May 1819
Ship	State	Description
Amity	United Kingdom	The ship was driven ashore whilst on a voyage from Bangor, Caernarvonshire to Southampton, Hampshire. She was later refloated and put into Amlwch, Anglesey for repairs.
Anna Maria	Rostock	The ship was wrecked on the North Bank, in Liverpool Bay with the loss of her captain. She was on a voyage from Rostock to Liverpool, Lancashire, United Kingdom.
Ganges	United States	The schooner was driven ashore and wrecked at Norfolk, Virginia. She was on a voyage from New York to Norfolk.
Phœnix	United States	The schooner was driven ashore and wrecked at Cape Hatteras, North Carolina. She was on a voyage from Suffolk, Virginia to Philadelphia, Pennsylvania.
Rachel & Betsey	United States	The ship was driven ashore at Norfolk, Virginia.
Telltale	United States	The schooner was driven ashore on Body's Island, North Carolina. She was on a voyage from New York to Norfolk, Virginia.
Virginia	United States	The ship was driven ashore on Craney Island, Virginia. She was on a voyage from Virginia to Liverpool, Lancashire, United Kingdom.

=== 14 May ===
List of shipwrecks: 14 May 1819
Ship	State	Description
Catharina	France	The ship sprang a leak and was beached at Swinemünde, Prussia, where she was later wrecked. She was on a voyage from Marseille, Bouches-du-Rhône, France to Lübeck and Stettin.
Leda	United Kingdom	The ship ran aground on a shoal 9 nautical miles (17 km) south west of Mayotte and was wrecked. Her crew were rescued. She was on a voyage from London to Bombay, India.

=== 15 May ===
List of shipwrecks: 15 May 1819
Ship	State	Description
Amazon	United Kingdom	The ship was driven ashore near Newport, Rhode Island, United States. She was on a voyage from British Honduras to Portland, Maine.
Freden	Duchy of Schleswig	The ship was driven ashore and wrecked at Westerhever. Her crew were rescued. She was on a voyage from London, United Kingdom to Westerhever.
Montgomery	United Kingdom	The ship was driven ashore near the Beavertail Lighthouse, Rhode Island, United States. She was on a voyage from British Honduras to Portland, Dorset.

=== 16 May ===
List of shipwrecks: 16 May 1819
Ship	State	Description
Halifax	United Kingdom	The ship sprang a leak and was abandoned in the Atlantic Ocean (48°30′N 26°30′W). Her crew were rescued by Alliance (United Kingdom). Halifax was on a voyage from Plymouth, Devon to Prince Edward Island, British North America. She foundered on 17 May.

=== 21 May ===
List of shipwrecks: 21 May 1819
Ship	State	Description
Modeste	France	The full-rigged ship was wrecked on Key Largo, East Florida, New Spain.

=== 22 May ===
List of shipwrecks: 22 May 1819
Ship	State	Description
Ann	United Kingdom	The ship struck The Smalls and foundered in the Irish Sea. She was on a voyage from Swansea, Glamorgan to Waterford.
Constitution	Insurgents	The privateer was driven ashore and wrecked at Tarifa, Spain. Her 73 crew were rescued and sent to prison.

=== 23 May ===
List of shipwrecks: 23 May 1819
Ship	State	Description
Malay	United Kingdom	The ship was damaged by fire at Greenock, Renfrewshire. She was on a voyage from Greenock to Jamaica.

=== 24 May ===
List of shipwrecks: 24 May 1819
Ship	State	Description
Fortuna	Hamburg	The ship was wrecked on the Kentish Knock, in the North Sea off Margate, Kent, United Kingdom with the loss of eleven of the fifteen people on board. She was on a voyage from Hamburg to Havana, Cuba.

=== 25 May ===
List of shipwrecks: 25 May 1819
Ship	State	Description
America	United States	The ship was wrecked at Block Island, Rhode Island. She was on a voyage from Saint Barthélemy to Boston, Massachusetts.
Henry	United Kingdom	The ship was driven ashore near Margate, Kent. She was on a voyage from London to Bristol, Gloucestershire. She was refloated and taken in to Sheerness, Kent in a leaky condition.

=== 26 May ===
List of shipwrecks: 26 May 1819
Ship	State	Description
Alexander	United Kingdom	The ship struck a floating object in the Mississippi River and was damaged. She was on a voyage from New Orleans, Louisiana, United States to Dundee, Forfarshire.

=== 27 May ===
List of shipwrecks: 27 May 1819
Ship	State	Description
Ceres	United Kingdom	The ship was lost at Swinemünde, Prussia. She was on a voyage from Stettin to Amsterdam, North Holland.
Ibbetsons	United Kingdom	The ship was driven ashore near Kirkwall, Orkney Islands. She was on a voyage from London to Arkhangelsk, Russia.
Jane	United Kingdom	The ship foundered near the "Kole". Five crew were rescued by a Norwegian ship. She was on a voyage from Riga, Russia to Leith, Lothian.
Samuel Whitbread	United Kingdom	The ship was driven ashore near Kirkwall.

=== 28 May ===
List of shipwrecks: 28 May 1819
Ship	State	Description
General Jackson	United States	The ship was driven ashore on Cape Florida, East Florida, New Spain. She was on a voyage from New Orleans, Louisiana to Rotterdam, South Holland, Netherlands.
St. Helena	United Kingdom	The ship was driven ashore and wrecked on Bermuda. She was n a voyage from Jamaica to Quebec City, Lower Canada, British North America.

=== 29 May ===
List of shipwrecks: 29 May 1819
Ship	State	Description
William & Isabella	United Kingdom	The sloop caught fire off South Shields, County Durham and was scuttled. She was on a voyage from South Shields to Dundee, Forfarshire.

=== 31 May ===
List of shipwrecks: 31 May 1819
Ship	State	Description
Margaretta	United Kingdom	The ship was driven ashore at the mouth of the River Towy. She was on a voyage from King's Lynn, Norfolk to Carmarthen.

=== Unknown date ===
List of shipwrecks: Unknown date in May 1819
Ship	State	Description
Ayon	Ottoman Empire	The ship was lost between Mount Athos and "Taso Island" before 27 May.
Bom Successo	Portugal	The ship was captured by an insurgent privateer. She was subsequently ran ashore and burnt on Little Island, Bahamas.
Diamond	United Kingdom	The whaler was run down and sunk off the coast of Greenland by Alexander (United Kingdom). Her crew were rescued.
Myrtle	United States	The schooner was abandoned in the Atlantic Ocean before 30 May.
Walton	United States	The schooner was wrecked in the Berry Islands. She was on a voyage from Baltimore, Maryland to Havana, Cuba.
Wharton	United Kingdom	The ship was driven ashore and severely damaged at Cape North, Nova Scotia, British North America. She was later refloated.
Zephyr	Netherlands	The ship was driven ashore near Swinemünde, Prussia before 19 May. She was on a voyage from Swinemünde to Amsterdam, North Holland.

== June ==
=== 1 June ===
List of shipwrecks: 1 June 1819
Ship	State	Description
Brothers	United Kingdom	The sloop sprang a leak and foundered in the Irish Sea 2 nautical miles (3.7 km) south east of the Copeland Lighthouse, Cumberland. Her crew survived. She was on a voyage from Carlingford, County Louth to Greenock, Renfrewshire.
HMS Erne	Royal Navy	The sloop-of-war was driven ashore and wrecked on Sal, Cape Verde Islands, Portugal. Her crew were rescued.

=== 2 June ===
List of shipwrecks: 2 June 1819
Ship	State	Description
Asia	United Kingdom	The transport ship ran aground at Cape Sable Island, Nova Scotia, British North America. She was refloated.
Svyatoy Ioann (Святой Иоанн, 'St. John')	Imperial Russian Navy	The brigantine was driven ashore by ice at the mouth of the Kamchatka River. Her crew were rescued.

=== 4 June ===
List of shipwrecks: 4 June 1819
Ship	State	Description
Nikolay (Николай, 'Nicholas')	Imperial Russian Navy	The transport ship capsized at Kerch. All on board survived. She was righted.

=== 6 June ===
List of shipwrecks: 6 June 1819
Ship	State	Description
Jean François	France	The ship was wrecked near Cayenne, French Guiana. Her crew were rescued.

=== 8 June ===
List of shipwrecks: 8 June 1819
Ship	State	Description
Brothers	United Kingdom	The sloop foundered off the Copeland Lighthouse. Her crew were rescued.

=== 9 June ===
List of shipwrecks: 9 June 1819
Ship	State	Description
Syren	United Kingdom	The ship was wrecked near "Cape Antonio". She was on a voyage from Jamaica to London.

=== 10 June ===
List of shipwrecks: 10 June 1819
Ship	State	Description
Clarissa	France	The ship was driven ashore at Royan, Charente-Maritime. Her crew were rescued. She was on a voyage from Newport, Monmouthshire, United Kingdom to Bordeaux, Gironde.
Wellington	United Kingdom	The brig ran aground and was wrecked off Havre de Grâce, Seine-Inférieure, France. She was on a voyage from Honfleur, Calvados to Blyth, Northumberland.

=== 11 June ===
List of shipwrecks: 11 June 1819
Ship	State	Description
Expedition	United Kingdom	The ship ran ashore at the South Foreland, Kent. She was on a voyage from Jamaica to Newcastle upon Tyne, Northumberland. She was refloated with assistance, and resumed her voyage the next day.

=== 13 June ===
List of shipwrecks: 13 June 1819
Ship	State	Description
Earl of Leicester	United Kingdom	The packet ship ran aground near the Hook Lighthouse, County Wexford and was wrecked. All on board were rescued. She was on a voyage from Milford Haven, Pembrokeshire to Waterford.

=== 14 June ===
List of shipwrecks: 14 June 1819
Ship	State	Description
Vine	United Kingdom	The ship sprang a leak and foundered in the Bristol Channel 2 leagues (6 nautical miles (11 km)) off Lundy Island, Devon. Her crew were rescued by HMRC Harpy ( Board of Customs).

=== 15 June ===
List of shipwrecks: 15 June 1819
Ship	State	Description
Amazon	United Kingdom	The ship was driven ashore and wrecked at Newport, Rhode Island, United States. She was on a voyage from British Honduras to Portland, Maine.

=== 17 June ===
List of shipwrecks: 17 June 1819
Ship	State	Description
Harmony	United Kingdom	The ship was driven ashore at Montreal, Quebec, British North America and severely damaged.

=== 19 June ===
List of shipwrecks: 19 June 1819
Ship	State	Description
Gustaff	Sweden	The ship was wrecked on the Corton Sand, in the North Sea off the coast of Suffolk, United Kingdom. She was on a voyage from Stockholm to Lisbon, Portugal.

=== 20 June ===
List of shipwrecks: 20 June 1819
Ship	State	Description
Commerce	(United Kingdom of Great Britain and Ireland) British North America	The ship was wrecked or foundered on the coast of Labrador. Her crew were rescued. She was on a voyage from Newfoundland to Labrador.
Magnet	United Kingdom	The ship ran aground and was damaged in the Insound and was damaged. She was on a voyage from South Shields, County Durham to Copenhagen, Denmark. She was later refloated.

=== 21 June ===
List of shipwrecks: 21 June 1819
Ship	State	Description
Friends	United Kingdom	The sloop was lost near "Dunravon" with the loss of her captain. She was on a voyage from Swansea, Glamorgan to Bridgwater, Somerset.
John and Henry	United States	The ship was driven ashore and wrecked at Gravelines, Nord, France. She was on a voyage from Hamburg to New York.

=== 24 June ===
List of shipwrecks: 24 June 1819
Ship	State	Description
Sans Pareil	United Kingdom	The ship sprang a leak and foundered in the North Sea. Her crew survived. She was on a voyage from Dover, Kent to Ostend, West Flanders, Netherlands.
Sidbury	United Kingdom	The ship was wrecked on the coast of British Honduras. Her crew were rescued. She was on a voyage from Rotterdam, South Holland, Netherlands to British Honduras.

=== 25 June ===
List of shipwrecks: 25 June 1819
Ship	State	Description
Aimée	France	The ship was driven ashore at La Bouille, Seine-Inférieure. She was on a voyage from Bristol, Gloucestershire, United Kingdom to Rouen, Seine-Inférieure.
America	United States	The ship was wrecked on Block Island, Rhode Island. She was on a voyage from Saint Barthélemy to Boston, Massachusetts.

=== 26 June ===
List of shipwrecks: 26 June 1819
Ship	State	Description
Blessing	United Kingdom	The ship driven ashore at Hurst, Hampshire. She was on a voyage from London to Poole, Dorset. She was refloated with assistance the next day.

=== 29 June ===
List of shipwrecks: 29 June 1819
Ship	State	Description
Ann	United Kingdom	The ship was captured by two sloops, one of them the Lawrence ( pirates) of Charleston, South Carolina, United States. She was deliberately wrecked on the Florida Reef. Three of her eight crew were murdered. She was on a voyage from Matanzas, Cuba to Falmouth, Cornwall.
Providence Increase	United Kingdom	The ship was driven ashore at Whitby, Yorkshire.

=== Unknown date ===
List of shipwrecks: Unknown date in June 1819
Ship	State	Description
Bream	(United Kingdom of Great Britain and Ireland) Antigua	The drogher sprang a leak and foundered at Falmouth, Antigua.
Brothers	United Kingdom	The ship was driven ashore on "Reed Island". She was on a voyage from Quebec City, British North America to Hull, Yorkshire. She was refloated and put back to Quebec City in a waterlogged condition.
Caroline	United States	The ship was wrecked on the coast of Patagonia.
Columbia	United Kingdom	The ship struck a sunken log in the Mississippi River. She was on a voyage from New Orleans, Louisiana, United States to Liverpool, Lancashire. She consequently put in to Newport, Virginia, United States in a leaky condition.
Deux Amis	France	The ship ran aground off Dunkerque, Nord. Her crew were rescued.
Fayette	United States	The ship was wrecked at Santo Domingo, Dominican Republic. She was on a voyage from New York to Santo Domingo.
Havannah	United Kingdom	The ship was severely damaged by fire at Richibucto, New Brunswik, British North America.
Industry	United Kingdom	The schooner sprang a leak and was abandoned in the Atlantic Ocean before 5 June.
Industry	United Kingdom	The ship was wrecked at Fox River, Nova Scotia, British North America.
Janus	United Kingdom	The ship foundered in the Caicos Passage. Her crew were rescued. She was on a voyage from New York to Port-au-Prince, Haiti.
John and Mary	United Kingdom	The ship was driven ashore in the Saint Lawrence River. She was on a voyage from Montreal, Quebec, British North America to Liverpool.
Ossian	(United Kingdom of Great Britain and Ireland) British North America	The full-rigged ship was abandoned in the Atlantic Ocean before 13 June.
San Nicola	Russia	The ship was sunk by a pirate whilst on a voyage from Genoa, Kingdom of Sardinia to Odessa. Her crew were murdered.
Sarah Sophia	United Kingdom	The ship was driven ashore and damaged on Grenada. She was on a voyage from Tobago to Newfoundland, British North America. She had been refloated by 14 June with assistance from the sloop Victory (United Kingdom).
Sophie de Lisbonne	France	The ship was wrecked at "Wednoon", Africa at the end of June. She was on a voyage from Nantes, Loire-Inférieure to Bahia, Brazil.
Thomas and Mary	United Kingdom	The transport ship ran ashore at Englishman's Head, Guadeloupe between 13 and 15 June. She was on a voyage from Antigua to Barbadoes. She was refloated and put back to Antigua.
Young Lachlan	Pirates	The schooner was wrecked off the coast of Java. Her thirteen crew survived; they were captured and imprisoned at Batavia, Netherlands East Indies.
Unnamed	Russia	The praam was run into by another praam and sank at Arkhangelsk.

== July ==
=== 3 July ===
List of shipwrecks: 3 July 1819
Ship	State	Description
Dawn	United Kingdom	The ship was driven ashore at the South Foreland, Kent. She was on a voyage from Quebec City, British North America to London. She was refloated and put in to Ramsgate, Kent in a leaky condition.

=== 6 July ===
List of shipwrecks: 6 July 1819
Ship	State	Description
Union	United Kingdom	The ship ran aground on St Peter's Island and was wrecked. Her crew were rescued. She was on a voyage from Shediac, New Brunswick, British North America to Aberdeen.

=== 7 July ===
List of shipwrecks: 7 July 1819
Ship	State	Description
Mary Ann	United Kingdom	The whaler was crushed by ice and sunk in the Davis Strait. Her crew were rescued.
Raith	United Kingdom	The whaler was crushed by ice and sunk in the Davis Strait. Her crew were rescued.
Stanton	United Kingdom	The ship ran aground and capsized on the Braak Sandbank, in the North Sea with the loss of a crew member. She floated off on or before 13 July.

=== 9 July ===
List of shipwrecks: 9 July 1819
Ship	State	Description
Vigilant	United Kingdom	The ship ran aground at Arkhangelsk, Russia. She was refloated and put back to Arkhangelsk in a leaky condition.

=== 13 July ===
List of shipwrecks: 13 July 1819
Ship	State	Description
Betsey	United Kingdom	The schooner was lost on a voyage from the Gut of Canso to Newfoundland.

=== 14 July ===
List of shipwrecks: 14 July 1819
Ship	State	Description
Catharina Christiana	Prussia	The ship was wrecked at Swinemünde. She was on a voyage from Trieste to Swinemünde.
Concord	Prussia	The ship was driven ashore near Swinemünde. She was on a voyage from Saint Petersburg, Russia to Swinemünde.
Jane & Margaret	United Kingdom	The ship ran aground on the Falsterbo Reef, in the Baltic Sea. She was on a voyage from Saint Petersburg, Russia to Bristol, Gloucestershire. Jane & Margaret was later refloated and taken in to Copenhagen, Denmark.
Concord	Prussia	The ship ran aground at Swinemünde.
Sisters	United Kingdom	The whaler was crushed by ice and sunk in the Davis Strait. Her crew were rescued.

=== 16 July ===
List of shipwrecks: 16 July 1819
Ship	State	Description
Equestris	United Kingdom	The whaler was crushed by ice and sunk in the Davis Strait with the loss of three of her crew.
Lord Howe Packet	United Kingdom	The ship struck a rock off Land's End, Cornwall and foundered. All on board were rescued. She was on a voyage from Penzance, Cornwall to the Isles of Scilly.
Majestic	United Kingdom	The whaler was crushed by ice and sunk in the Davis Strait. Her crew were rescued.
Mermaid	United Kingdom	The ship was driven ashore and wrecked at Cape Negro, Nova Scotia, British North America. All on board were rescued.
Ocean	United Kingdom	The whaler was crushed by ice and sunk in the Davis Strait. Her crew were rescued.
Royal Bounty	United Kingdom	The whaler was crushed by ice and sunk in the Davis Strait. Her crew were rescued.
Samuels	United Kingdom	The whaler was crushed by ice and sunk in the Davis Strait. Her crew were rescued.
Tay	United Kingdom	The whaler was crushed by ice and sunk in the Davis Strait. Her crew were rescued.
Thomas and Ann	United Kingdom	The whaler was crushed by ice and sunk in the Davis Strait. Her crew were rescued.

=== 17 July ===
List of shipwrecks: 17 July 1819
Ship	State	Description
Kitty	United Kingdom	The ship was wrecked on Cross Island, Maine, United States. All on board were rescued. She was on a voyage from Annan Dumfriesshire to Saint John, New Brunswick, British North America.

=== 18 July ===
List of shipwrecks: 18 July 1819
Ship	State	Description
George	United Kingdom	The ship was driven ashore and wrecked at Hoylake, Lancashire with the loss of all hands. She was on a voyage from Liverpool, Lancashire to London. George was refloated on 19 July.
George	United Kingdom	The schooner was wrecked near Cardiff, Glamorgan with the loss of all fourteen people on board. She was on a voyage from Ulverston, Lancashire to Cardiff.
Lord Belhaven	United Kingdom	The brig was totally lost 20 nautical miles (37 km) from Port-au-Prince, Haiti. She was on a voyage from Aux Cayes, Haiti to Port-au-Prince.
Minerva	United Kingdom	The brig was driven ashore and wrecked at Cape Negro, Nova Scotia, British North America. All on board were rescued.

=== 19 July ===
List of shipwrecks: 19 July 1819
Ship	State	Description
Jamaica	(United Kingdom of Great Britain and Ireland) Jamaica	The schooner was wrecked on the Salamanca Reef, in the Caribbean Sea off the coast of Colombia with the loss of more than eighteen lives. There were ten survivors.

=== 20 July ===
List of shipwrecks: 20 July 1819
Ship	State	Description
Contest	United Kingdom	The ship ran ashore near Holyhead, Anglesey. She was refloated with assistance.
Hayston	United Kingdom	The ship was lost in the Maldives. She was on a voyage from Mauritius to Madras, India.
Lady Warren	United Kingdom	The ship was run into by Palinure (United Kingdom) at Gibraltar and was seveely damaged.

=== 21 July ===
List of shipwrecks: 21 July 1819
Ship	State	Description
Tage	France	The ship was wrecked between Fécamp and Havre de Grâce, Seine-Inférieure. She was on a voyage from Saint-Domingue to Havre de Grâce.

=== 22 July ===
List of shipwrecks: 22 July 1819
Ship	State	Description
Veronica	United Kingdom	The ship was driven ashore near Calais, France. She was on a voyage from South Shields, County Durham to Quebec City, Lower Canada, British North America.

=== 24 July ===
List of shipwrecks: 24 July 1819
Ship	State	Description
Deux Sœurs	France	The ship struck a rock in the Seine and was wrecked. She was on a voyage from London, United Kingdom to Rouen, Seine-Inférieure.
St. Lawrence	(United Kingdom of Great Britain and Ireland) Jamaica	The ship was wrecked on the East South East Key. Her crew were rescued.

=== 25 July ===
List of shipwrecks: 25 July 1819
Ship	State	Description
Speculation	(United Kingdom of Great Britain and Ireland) Bermuda	The schooner was wrecked on the north coast of Barbuda. Her crew were rescued.
Two unnamed vessels	United States	The ships were wrecked on the Florida Reef.

=== 27 July ===
List of shipwrecks: 27 July 1819
Ship	State	Description
Liberty	United Kingdom	The ship was driven ashore and wrecked at Elsy Point, near Wick, Caithness. Her crew were rescued. She was on a voyage from Saint Petersburg, Russia to Belfast, County Antrim.
Siro	United States	The ship was wrecked in the Turks Islands. She was on a voyage from Philadelphia, Pennsylvania to St. Jago de Cuba, Cuba.

=== 29 July ===
List of shipwrecks: 29 July 1819
Ship	State	Description
Fortitude	United Kingdom	The ship ran aground on the Goodwin Sands, Kent. She was on a voyage from Swansea, Glamorgan to London. She was refloated and taken in to Margate, Kent.

=== 30 July ===
List of shipwrecks: 30 July 1819
Ship	State	Description
Crown	United Kingdom	The ship was driven ashore in the Queen's Channel. She was on a voyage from London to Quebec City, British North America. She was refloated and put back to the River Thames.
Daphne	United Kingdom	The ship was wrecked at Arkhangelsk, Russia.

=== 31 July ===
List of shipwrecks: 31 July 1819
Ship	State	Description
Squirrel	United Kingdom	The ship ran aground on the Whitby Rock. She was refloated and resumed her voyage.

=== Unknown date ===
List of shipwrecks: Unknown date in July 1819
Ship	State	Description
Beckles	United Kingdom	The schooner was wrecked on a reef off Old Providence. She was on a voyage from Old Providence to San Andreas.
Constantine	United Kingdom	The ship was wrecked on Grand Cayman Island at the end of July. She was on a voyage from Jamaica to London.
Eliza	United Kingdom	The ship was wrecked off Cape Sable Island, Nova Scotia, British North America. Her crew were rescued. She was on a voyage from Liverpool, Lancashire to Saint John, New Brunswick, British North America.
Friends	United Kingdom	The sloop was wrecked off Old Providence. She was on a voyage from Jamaica to Old Providence and San Andreas.
Gambier	United Kingdom	The ship was lost at the mouth of the Orinoco. She was on a voyage from Hamburg to Angostura, Viceroyalty of New Granada.
Hamilton	United Kingdom	The ship was wrecked on the east coast of Bermuda.
Hebe	United Kingdom	The ship was wrecked on the coast of Newfoundland, British North America. She was on a voyage from Liverpool to Newfoundland.
Herman	United Kingdom	The ship was driven ashore and wrecked in the Caicos Islands. She was on a voyage from Saint John, New Brunswick, British North America to Jamaica.
Hunter	United States	The ship ran aground off the Île de Batz, Finistère, France. She was on a voyage from Charleston, South Carolina to Antwerp, Netherlands. She was refloated and completed her voyage, arriving at Antwerp on 31 July in a severely leaky condition.
Jamaica	(United Kingdom of Great Britain and Ireland) Jamaica	The schooner was lost with the loss of all but three of her crew.
Macgregor	United Kingdom	The brig ran aground at Aux Cayes, Haiti, where she was wrecked three days later.
Martely	United States	The schooner was abandoned in the Atlantic Ocean off Tenerife, Canary Islands before 27 July.
Minerva	(United Kingdom of Great Britain and Ireland) Jamaica	The schooner was lost on a voyage from the San Blas Islands, Colombia to Kingston, Jamaica. Four of the ten people on board were presumed lost.
Protector	United Kingdom	The ship ran aground on a reef fout of Grand Manan, New Brunswick between 1 and 4 July. She was on a voyage from Saint John, New Brunswick to Greenock, Renfrewshire. She was refloated and put back to Saint John.
Sally	United States	The ship departed from Oporto, Portugal for New York. No further trace, presumed foundered with the loss of all hands.
St. Grao	Spain	The ship was wrecked on the Olla del Castillo Rock in early July. Her crew were rescued. She was on a voyage from Barcelona to Cádiz.
Vigilant	United Kingdom	The ship ran aground in the Saint Lawrence River and was severely damaged. She was refloated and found to be severely leaky.

== August ==
=== 1 August ===
List of shipwrecks: 1 August 1819
Ship	State	Description
Amie Falvey	United States	The ship ran aground on the Caicos Reef. She was on a voyage from Cape Henry, Virginia to Portland, Maine. She was refloated.
Ann	(United Kingdom of Great Britain and Ireland) Jamaica	The sloop capsized in a squall off Oracabessa. Her crew were rescued. She was on a voyage from Montego Bay to Havana, Cuba.

=== 2 August ===
List of shipwrecks: 2 August 1819
Ship	State	Description
Eagle	United Kingdom	The ship was wrecked near Cape English, Newfoundland, British North America. Her crew were rescued. She was on a voyage from Miramichi Bay to Leith, Lothian.
Horatio	United Kingdom	The ship was driven ashore at Saltfleet, Lincolnshire. She was on a voyage from London to Selby, Yorkshire. Horation was later refloated.

=== 5 August ===
List of shipwrecks: 5 August 1819
Ship	State	Description
Jeune Ferdinand	France	The ship foundered in the Indian Ocean (7°31′S 78°50′E) with the loss of thirteen of her fifteen crew. She was on a voyage from Sumatra to Mauritius.

=== 6 August ===
List of shipwrecks: 6 August 1819
Ship	State	Description
Helen	United Kingdom	The brig was plundered by William ( William Delano) and an attempt was made to scuttle her. She was abandoned by her crew and subsequently driven ashore and wrecked at Águilas, Spain on this date. Helen was on a voyage from Liverpool, Lancashire to Genoa, Kingdom of Sardinia. William was seized at Smyrna, Ottoman Empire by HM Hired Armed Ship Frederick (Royal Navy). Her crew arrived at Malta on 3 October. They were put on trial on 26 October.

=== 9 August ===
List of shipwrecks: 9 August 1819
Ship	State	Description
Sarah	United Kingdom	The ship struck a rock off Larne, County Antrim and foundered. Her crew were rescued. She was on a voyage from Belfast, County Antrim to Quebec, British North America.
Vigilant	United Kingdom	The ship was lost in the Weser.

=== 13 August ===
List of shipwrecks: 13 August 1819
Ship	State	Description
Augusta Henrietta	Danzig	The ship foundered on the Dutch coast. Her crew were rescued. She was on a voyage from Danzig to Amsterdam, North Holland, Netherlands.
Hercules	United Kingdom	The ship was destroyed by fire at Saint Vincent. Her crew were rescued.

=== 14 August ===
List of shipwrecks: 14 August 1819
Ship	State	Description
Tods	United Kingdom	The transport ship was driven ashore and damaged on Scharhörn, Hamburg.

=== 15 August ===
List of shipwrecks: 15 August 1819
Ship	State	Description
Brothers	(United Kingdom of Great Britain and Ireland) British North America	The schooner was driven ashore in Freshwater Bay, Newfoundland.
Unnamed	Netherlands	Atlantic slave trade: The schooner was run ashore and wrecked on the coast of Africa by HMS Morgiana (Royal Navy).

=== 17 August ===
List of shipwrecks: 17 August 1819
Ship	State	Description
Aire	United Kingdom	The ship ran aground on the Scroby Sands, Norfolk. She was on a voyage from Danzig to London. Ayr was refloated but was consequently beached at Great Yarmouth, Norfolk. Aire was refloated on 7 September and taken in to Great Yarmouth.
Jupiter	United Kingdom	The ship was driven ashore on the coast of East Florida, New Spain. She was on a voyage from Jamaica to London. Jupiter was refloated on 21 August and put into Nassau, Bahamas, where she arrived on 7 September.

=== 18 August ===
List of shipwrecks: 18 August 1819
Ship	State	Description
Rover	United Kingdom	The ship was wrecked at Leba, Prussia. Her crew were rescued.

=== 23 August ===
List of shipwrecks: 23 August 1819
Ship	State	Description
Hawke	United Kingdom	The ship was abandoned in the Norwegian Sea off Nordkapp, Norway. Her crew were rescued by Royalist (United Kingdom). Hawke was taken in to Tromsø, Norway in a waterlogged condition on 6 September.

=== 25 August ===
List of shipwrecks: 25 August 1819
Ship	State	Description
Ruby	United Kingdom	The ship was sighted in the Øresund whilst on a voyage from Saint Petersburg, Russia to Bristol, Gloucestershire. No further trace, presumed foundered with the loss of all hands.
Speculation	United Kingdom	The ship was lost north of Barbuda. Her crew were rescued.
Victory	United Kingdom	The cutter ran aground on a reef off Grenada. She was refloated.

=== 26 August ===
List of shipwrecks: 26 August 1819
Ship	State	Description
Barilla	(United States) Missouri Territory	The ship was wrecked on the Florida Reef.
Lively	United States	The schooner was wrecked on the Florida Reef. Her crew were rescued.
Sarah Ann	United States	The ship was wrecked on the Florida Reef.

=== 27 August ===
List of shipwrecks: 27 August 1819
Ship	State	Description
Lovely Nelly	United Kingdom	The ship was lost in the Saint Lawrence River. All on board were rescued. She was on a voyage from Workington, Cumberland to Quebec City, Lower Canada, British North America.

=== 29 August ===
List of shipwrecks: 29 August 1819
Ship	State	Description
Auspicious	United Kingdom	The ship departed from Dublin for Liverpool, Lancashire. No further trace.
Good Hope	(United Kingdom of Great Britain and Ireland) Cape Colony	The coaster, a brig, was driven ashore and wrecked in Algoa Bay.
Urtenhagen	(United Kingdom of Great Britain and Ireland) Cape Colony	The coaster was driven ashore and wrecked in Algoa Bay.

=== 30 August ===
List of shipwrecks: 30 August 1819
Ship	State	Description
Alert	United Kingdom	The schooner was driven ashore and wrecked at Game's Loup, Ayrshire. Her crew were rescued. She was on a voyage from Dumbarton to Belfast, County Antrim.
Atlas	United Kingdom	The brig was wrecked at Whitehaven, Cumberland.
Britannia	United Kingdom	The brig was driven ashore and wrecked at Landel Foot, Ayrshire. Her crew were rescued.
Contest	United Kingdom	The brig was wrecked at Whitehaven. Her crew were rescued by the Whitehaven Lifeboat.
Cybele	United Kingdom	The ship was driven ashore and damaged at Regent's Dock, Liverpool. She was on a voyage from Miramichi, New Brunswick, British North America to Liverpool. Cybele was later refloated.
Dee	United Kingdom	The ship was driven ashore at Mockbeggar, Cheshire. She was on a voyage from Miramichi Bay to Liverpool, Lancashire. Dee was later refloated and taken in to Liverpool in a waterlogged condition.
Flora Commercia	Prussia	The ship was driven ashore at Formby, Lancashire.
Fortune	United Kingdom	The brig was wrecked at Whitehaven.
Integrity	United Kingdom	The ship struck the pier and sank at Whitehaven. She was on a voyage from Quebec City, Lower Canada, British North America to Workington, Cumberland. Integrity was later refloated.
Margaret	(United States) Missouri Territory	The ship was driven ashore in the River Mersey. She was on a voyage from New Orleans, Louisiana, United States to Liverpool. She was later refloated.
Martin	United Kingdom	The ship was driven ashore at Formby. She was on a voyage from Liverpool to Dunkerque, Nord, France. Martin was later refloated.
Mary	United Kingdom	The ship was wrecked near Crosby, Lancashire. She was on a voyage from Pwllheli, Caernarfonshire to Greenock, Renfrewshire.
Mary	United Kingdom	The ship was abandoned in the North Sea off Domesnes, Norway by all but three of her crew. She was on a voyage from Sundsvall, Sweden to London. The rest of her crew were rescued on 9 September by Highflier (United Kingdom), whih put some of her crew aboard Mary. They took her in to North Shields, Northumberland in a waterlogged condition.
Phœnix	United Kingdom	The sloop was driven ashore and wrecked at Whitehaven.
Pike	United Kingdom	The ship was wrecked on rocks off Priestholm, Anglesey. Her crew were rescued. She was on a voyage from Liverpool to Hamburg.
Rodney	United Kingdom	The ship was driven ashore in the River Mersey. She was later refloated. Rodney was on a voyage from Miramichi Bay to Liverpool.
Supply	United Kingdom	The ship was driven ashore at Mockbeggar.
Susan	United Kingdom	The ship was driven ashore and wrecked at Formby, Lancashire with the loss of two of her crew. She was on a voyage from New Orleans, Louisiana to Liverpool.
Tartar	United Kingdom	The ship was driven ashore and wrecked at Ravenglass, Cumberland.
Thistle	United Kingdom	The galiot was wrecked at Whitehaven. Her crew were rescued by the Whitehaven Lifeboat.
Two Brothers	United Kingdom	The schooner was driven ashore and wrecked at Whitehaven.
Unnamed	United Kingdom	The sloop was wrecked at Whitehaven.

=== 31 August ===
List of shipwrecks: 31 August 1819
Ship	State	Description
Albion	United Kingdom	The brig was driven ashore and wrecked at Lytham St. Annes, Lancashire with the loss of nine lives. She was on a voyage from Antigua to Liverpool, Lancashire.
Auspicious	United Kingdom	The ship was wrecked on the Hoyle Bank, in Liverpool Bay with the loss of all hands. She was on a voyage from Dublin to Liverpool, Lancashire.
Bonne Victoire	France	The ship was driven ashore and wrecked near Calais. She was on a voyage from La Rochelle, Charente-Maritime to Calais.
Carrier	United Kingdom	The ship was driven ashore near Formby, Lancashire. Her crew were rescued. She was on a voyage from Whitehaven, Cumberland to Liverpool.
Floreat Commercecium	Netherlands	The ship was driven ashore at Formby. Her crew were rescued. she was on a voyage from Schiedam, South Holland to Liverpool.
Unnamed	Flag unknown	The ship was driven ashore and wrecked at Formby with the loss of all hands.

=== Unknown date ===
List of shipwrecks: Unknown date in August 1819
Ship	State	Description
Adelle	Netherlands	The ship was wrecked on the south east coast of Sumatra. All on board were rescued.
Swift	United Kingdom	The ship was driven ashore near "Wargo" before 16 August.
Syren	United Kingdom	Atlantic slave trade: The sloop was seized before 28 August by some African slaves, who murdered her captain and wrecked her on the "Isle of May".
HMS Tamar	Royal Navy	The Conway-class post ship was driven ashore on the coast of Labrador, British North America in early August. She was later refloated.
Vestal	United Kingdom	The ship was wrecked on Corker Key in early August. She was on a voyage from British Honduras to London.

== September ==
=== 1 September ===
List of shipwrecks: 1 September 1819
Ship	State	Description
Carrien	United Kingdom	The ship was driven ashore at Formby, Lancashire. Her crew were rescued.
Floreat Commercecium	Netherlands	The ship was driven ashore at Formby. Her crew were rescued. She was on a voyage from Schiedam, South Holland to Liverpool, Lancashire.
Susan	United States	The ship was driven ashore and wrecked at Southport, Lancashire with the loss of two of her crew. She was on a voyage from New York to Liverpool.
Trinity	United Kingdom	The yacht was driven ashore and severely damaged at Boulogne, Pas-de-Calais, France. All on board survived.

=== 2 September ===
List of shipwrecks: 2 September 1819
Ship	State	Description
San Telmo	Spanish Navy	The ship-of-the-line foundered in the Drake Passage with the loss of all 644 people on board.

=== 3 September ===
List of shipwrecks: 3 September 1819
Ship	State	Description
Dona Paulo	Portugal	Atlantic slave trade: The ship was wrecked off Anegada, Virgin Islands. Her crew and 235 African slaves were rescued.
George Canning	United Kingdom	The ship departed from Port-au-Prince, Haiti for London. No further trace, presumed foundered with the loss of all hands.
Martin	United Kingdom	The ship was driven ashore at Formby Point, Lancashire. She was on a voyage from Liverpool, Lancashire to Dunkerque, Nord, France.
Ville de Rouen	France	The ship was lost near Havana, Cuba. Al on board were rescued. She was on a voyage from Havre de Grâce, Seine-Inférieure to Havana.

=== 5 September ===
List of shipwrecks: 5 September 1819 age from Rio de Janeiro to Bahia
Ship	State	Description
Hero	United Kingdom	The ship ran aground at Bahia, Brazil. She was on a voyage from Rio de Janeiro to Bahia. Hero was refloated on 27 September and taken in to Bahia.
Phœnix	(United Kingdom of Great Britain and Ireland) British North America	The steamboat was destroyed by fire in Lake Champlain with the loss of six lives.

=== 6 September ===
List of shipwrecks: 6 September 1819
Ship	State	Description
Donald Crawford	United Kingdom	The ship departed from Bermuda for Montego Bay, Jamaica. No further trace, presumed foundered with the loss of all hands.
Three Johns	United Kingdom	The ship was wrecked between Ameland and Schiermonnikoog, Friesland, Netherlands. Her crew were rescued. She was on a voyage from Newcastle upon Tyne, Northumberland to Amsterdam, North Holland, Netherlands.
Sykes	United Kingdom	The brig was driven ashore at Shoreham-by-Sea, Sussex.

=== 7 September ===
List of shipwrecks: 7 September 1819
Ship	State	Description
Albion	United Kingdom	The ship was wrecked at Lytham, Lancashire with the loss of eight lives. She was on a voyage from Antigua to Liverpool, Lancashire.
Jane	United Kingdom	The ship was driven ashore at Clonakilty, County Cork. She was on a voyage from Jamaica to Glasgow, Renfrewshire. Jane was refloated on 14 September and taken in to Castlehaven, County Cork.
Juno	United Kingdom	The ship ran aground on the Haisborough Sands, in the North Sea off the coast of Norfolk. She was on a voyage from Saint Petersburg, Russia to London. She was refloated and completed her voyage.
Prins Oscar	Sweden	The ship was driven ashore at Marstrand. She was on a voyage from Cádiz, Spain to Karlskrona.
Victoire	France	The ship was driven ashore and wrecked on the Isla de Lobos, Brazil. She was on a voyage from Saint-Malo, Ille-et-Vilaine to Rio de Janeiro and Buenos Aires, Brazil.
William	United Kingdom	The ship departed from Havana, Cuba for Cowes, Isle of Wight. No further trace, presumed foundered with the loss of all hands.

=== 8 September ===
List of shipwrecks: 8 September 1819
Ship	State	Description
George	United Kingdom	The ship ran aground on the Gunfleet Sand, in the North Sea off the coast of Essex. Her crew were rescued. George was refloated on 10 September and taken in to Brightlingsea, Essex.
Helen	United Kingdom	The brig was wrecked at Rattray Head, Aberdeenshire.

=== 9 September ===
List of shipwrecks: 9 September 1819
Ship	State	Description
Zeenymph	Netherlands	The ship foundered in the North Sea. Her crew survived. She was on a voyage from Arkhangelsk, Russia to Amsterdam, North Holland.
Princess Cobourg	United Kingdom	The ship was driven ashore at The Mumbles, Glamorgan. She was on a voyage from Bangor to Newhaven, Sussex. She was later refloated, and put in to Swansea, Glamorgan on 22 September.

=== 14 September ===
List of shipwrecks: 14 September 1819
Ship	State	Description
Cherub	United Kingdom	The ship struck a rock 10 nautical miles (19 km) south of "Wingo" and was wrecked. Her crew were rescued by Charlotte (United Kingdom). Cherub was on a voyage from Hull to Saint Petersburg, Russia.
Cornwall	United Kingdom	The ship ran aground on the Rush Shoal, off Blackwater, County Wexford. She was on a voyage from Bengal, India to Liverpool, Lancashire. She was refloated the next day and completed her voyage.
Nimble	United Kingdom	The ship struck rocks off Jersey, Channel Islands and sank. Her crew were rescued. She was on a voyage from Plymouth, Devon to Jersey.
Phoenix	United States	The 146-foot (45 m) sidewheel paddle steamer burned and sank with the loss of six lives in 60 to 110 feet (18 to 34 m) of water on the north side of Colchester Shoal off Colchester Point northwest of Burlington, Vermont (44°33.3′N 073°20.1′W) during a night crossing of Lake Champlain.

=== 15 September ===
List of shipwrecks: 15 September 1819
Ship	State	Description
Abbey	United Kingdom	The ship was wrecked at Holyhead, Anglesey. She was on a voyage from Charlestown, Cornwall to Liverpool, Lancashire.
Dublin	United Kingdom	The packet ship ran aground on the Goodwin Sands, Kent. She was on a voyage from London to Dublin. She was refloated, resuming her voyage the next day.
Rebecca Coffin	United Kingdom	The ship was wrecked at Ballyferris, County Down. All on board were rescued. She was on a voyage from the Clyde to Charleston, South Carolina, United States.

=== 16 September ===
List of shipwrecks: 16 September 1819
Ship	State	Description
George and Anne	United Kingdom	The ship put in to Padstow, Cornwall in a sinking condition. She was on a voyage from Truro, Cornwall to Swansea, Glamorgan.
Nancy	United Kingdom	The packet ship collided with Henry (United Kingdom) in the English Channel and sank. All on board were rescued. Nancy was on a voyage from Brighton, Sussex to Dieppe, Seine-Inférieure, France.

=== 17 September ===
List of shipwrecks: 17 September 1819
Ship	State	Description
True Briton	United Kingdom	The ship foundered in the English Channel off The Lizard, Cornwall. Her crew were rescued by Neptune (United Kingdom). True Briton was on a voyage from Milford Haven, Pembrokeshire to Penzance, Cornwall.

=== 18 September ===
List of shipwrecks: 18 September 1819
Ship	State	Description
Courier	France	The ship was lost whilst on a voyage from Marennes, Charente-Maritime to Dunkerque, Nord.
Emelie	France	The ship was lost off Læsø, Denmark. Her crew were rescued. She was on a voyage from Stettin to Bordeaux, Gironde.
Jason	United Kingdom	The ship was driven ashore at Widewall, Orkney Islands. She was on a voyage from Arkhangelsk, Russia to Belfast, County Down. Jason was refloated on 24 September. She arrived at Belfast on 5 October.
Susan	United Kingdom	The ship ran aground on the Corton Sand, in the North sea off the coast of Suffolk and was abandoned by her crew. She was on a voyage from Arkhangelsk, Russia to Sheerness, Kent. Susan was taken in to Harwich, Essex in a waterlogged condition on 20 September.

=== 20 September ===
List of shipwrecks: 20 September 1819
Ship	State	Description
Dapphne	United Kingdom	The ship capsized whilst on a voyage from Demerara to Halifax, Nova Scotia, British North America.
Jane	United Kingdom	The ship was abandoned in the Atlantic Ocean. She was towed in to Five Islands, Antigua on 15 October in a wrecked condition.
Mary & Jane	United Kingdom	The ship was wrecked on the Southern Fisheries. Her crew were rescued after five days in the long boat. She was on a voyage from British Honduras to Jamaica.
Unnamed	Spain	Atlantic slave trade: The schooner was run ashore and wrecked on the coast of Africa by HMS Morgiana (Royal Navy). The wreck was plundered by the local inhabitants.

=== 21 September ===
List of shipwrecks: 21 September 1819
Ship	State	Description
Abram	United Kingdom	The ship was driven ashore in a hurricane at Norman's Island, Tortola. She was later refloated.
Ajax	United Kingdom	The full-rigged ship was driven ashore and severely damaged in a hurricane at Anegada, Virgin Islands. Two of her crew were lost. She was on a voyage from London to Havana, Cuba.
Barton	United Kingdom	The ship was driven ashore and wrecked in a hurricane at Little Harbour, Tortola.
Brutus	United Kingdom	The ship was wrecked off Eastham, Massachusetts, United States with the loss of at least twelve lives. She was on a voyage from Saint John, New Brunswick, British North America to New York, United States.
Catharine	United Kingdom	The ship was driven ashore in a hurricane at Tortola. She was later refloated.
Charming Eliza	United Kingdom	The ship was damaged beyond repair in a hurricane at St. Barthélmy.
Countess of Chichester	United Kingdom	The ship was driven ashore in a hurricane at St. Thomas, Virgin Islands. She was later refloated.
Dragon	(United Kingdom of Great Britain and Ireland) Antigua	The sloop was wrecked in a hurricane at Saint Barthélemy.
Elisa	United Kingdom	The ship sank in a hurricane at Tortola.
Elizabeth	United Kingdom	The ship was driven ashore and severely damaged at Norman's Island Tortola.
Faith	United Kingdom	The ship was driven ashore and damaged in a hurricane at Tortola.
Faithful Jane	(United Kingdom of Great Britain and Ireland) Antigua	The schooner was wrecked in a hurricane at Saint Barthelemy.
Jane	United Kingdom	The ship sank in a hurricane at Tortola. She was later refloated.
John Burke	United Kingdom	The schooner was wrecked in a hurricane at Montserrat.
John & Margaret	United Kingdom	The ship sank in a hurricane at Tortola.
Mary	United Kingdom	The ship was driven ashore in a hurricane at Little Island, Tortola.
Mary & Eliza	United Kingdom	The full-rigged ship was wrecked in a hurricane at Saint Barthélemy.
Mary Ann	United Kingdom	The ship was driven ashore and wrecked on Guana Island.
Seaham	United Kingdom	The ship struck the Heaps Sandbank, in the North Sea and foundered. Her crew were rescued. She was on a voyage from Newcastle upon Tyne, Northumberland to London.
Strauss	Prussia	The ship was driven ashore and wrecked at Hela.
Theodore	United Kingdom	The ship ran aground on the Burbo Bank, in Liverpool Bay. She was on a voyage from Liverpool, Lancashire to Newfoundland, British North America. She was refloated and resumed her voyage.
Two Brothers	United Kingdom	The ship was driven ashore in a hurricane at Tortola.
Two Sisters	United Kingdom	The ship was driven ashore in a hurricane at Tortola. She was later refloated.
Two Sisters	United Kingdom	The ship was driven ashore and wrecked in a hurricane at Beef Island, Tortola.

=== 22 September ===
List of shipwrecks: 22 September 1819
Ship	State	Description
Anna Elizabeth von Scholter	France	The brig was driven ashore in a hurricane at Saint Thomas, Virgin Islands.
Betsey	United Kingdom	The full-rigged ship was driven ashore in a hurricane at Saint Thomas.
Brutus	Venezuelan Navy	The cruiser was driven ashore and wrecked during a hurricane at Nevis.
Charlotte	Netherlands	The full-rigged ship was driven ashore in a hurricane at Saint Thomas.
Confiance	United Kingdom	The brig was driven ashore in a hurricane at Saint Thomas.
Countess of Chichester	United Kingdom	The cutter was driven ashore in a hurricane at Saint Thomas.
Eclipse	(United Kingdom of Great Britain and Ireland) Antigua	The schooner was driven ashore and wrecked in a hurricane at Antigua.
Emma	(United Kingdom of Great Britain and Ireland) Antigua	The sloop was driven ashore in a hurricane at Antigua.
Fly	United Kingdom	The sloop was driven ashore in a hurricane at Saint Kitts.
Fortuna	Denmark	The full-rigged ship was driven ashore in a hurricane at Saint Thomas.
Gibsey	(United Kingdom of Great Britain and Ireland) Antigua	The brig was driven ashore in a hurricane at Antigua.
General Leith	United Kingdom	The sloop was driven ashore in a hurricane at Saint Kitts.
Hero	United Kingdom	The full-rigged ship was driven ashore in a hurricane at Saint Thomas.
Industry	United Kingdom	The sloop foundered off Nevis in a hurricane. Her crew were rescued.
Louisa	(United Kingdom of Great Britain and Ireland) Antigua	The brig was driven ashore in a hurricane at Antigua.
Manuel	United Kingdom	The brig was driven ashore in a hurricane at Saint Kitts.
Maria	United Kingdom	The sloop was driven ashore in a hurricane at Nevis. Her crew were rescued.
Mary	United States	The schooner was driven ashore in a hurricane at Antigua.
Neptune	(United Kingdom of Great Britain and Ireland) Antigua	The schooner was driven ashore in a hurricane at Antigua.
Perseverance	United Kingdom	The sloop was driven out to sea from Saint Kitts in a hurricane. No further trace, presumed foundered with the loss of all hands.
Robert	United Kingdom	The sloop capsized off Nevis in a hurricane with the loss of all hands.
Sir James Leith	(United Kingdom of Great Britain and Ireland) Antigua	The schooner was driven ashore in a hurricane at Antigua.
Sueca	Portugal	The full-rigged ship was driven ashore in a hurricane at Antigua.
Union	(United Kingdom of Great Britain and Ireland) Antigua	The sloop was driven ashore in a hurricane at Antigua.
Zephyr	(United Kingdom of Great Britain and Ireland) Antigua	The schooner was driven ashore in a hurricane at Antigua.

=== 24 September ===
List of shipwrecks: 24 September 1819
Ship	State	Description
Three Friends	United Kingdom	The ship departed from Cuxhaven, Kingdom of Hanover for Madeira, Portugal. No further trace, presumed foundered with the loss of all hands.

=== 25 September ===
List of shipwrecks: 25 September 1819
Ship	State	Description
Andrea Margaretha	Russia	The ship foundered in the Baltic Sea off Hogland.
Ant	United Kingdom	The ship was driven ashore on St. Michael's Island, Devon. She was on a voyage from Liverpool, Lancashire to Antwerp, Netherlands. Ant was later refloated and resumed her voyage.
Brothers	United Kingdom	The ship was wrecked at Ventava, Courland Governorate.
Miles Standish	United States	The ship was driven ashore on the Tuckanuck Shoals. She was on a voyage from Gothenburg, Sweden to Boston, Massachusetts.

=== 26 September ===
List of shipwrecks: 26 September 1819
Ship	State	Description
Elizabeth	United Kingdom	The ship was driven ashore and wrecked at Portlethen, Aberdeenshire. She was refloated on 5 October and taken in to Portlethen.
Polifem (Полифем, 'Polyphemus')	Imperial Russian Navy	The transport ship ran aground at Riga. Her crew were rescued. She was later refloated and returned to service.

=== 27 September ===
List of shipwrecks: 27 September 1819
Ship	State	Description
Åbo	(Russian Empire) Grand Duchy of Finland	The ship was driven ashore at Littlehampton, Sussex, United Kingdom. She was on a voyage from Bordeaux, Gironde, France to Åbo.
Kingston	United Kingdom	The ship was driven ashore at Redcar, Yorkshire. Her crew were rescued. She was on a voyage from Ipswich, Suffolk to South Shields, County Durham.
Mercure	France	The brig capsized 10 leagues (30 nautical miles (56 km)) from Boulogne, Pas-de-Calais with the loss of twelve lives. Twelve survivors were rescued by the lugger Argus (France). Mercure was on a voyage from Rouen, Seine-Inférieure to Saint Petersburg, Russia.
Nelson	United Kingdom	The smack stuck a rock and was beached at Lochmaddy, North Uist, Outer Hebrides. She was on a voyage from Fraserburgh, Aberdeenshire to Cork. She was repaired.
William	United Kingdom	The ship was driven ashore between Irvine and Saltcoats, Ayrshire. She was on a voyage from Dublin to Saltcoats.

=== 28 September ===
List of shipwrecks: 28 September 1819
Ship	State	Description
Ruth	United Kingdom	The ship was wrecked at Cape Riger, in the Saint Lawrence River. Her crew were rescued.

=== 30 September ===
List of shipwrecks: 30 September 1819
Ship	State	Description
Nicholas	Russia	The ship ran aground on the Elbow Sand, in the River Tay. She was on a voyage from Riga to Dundee, Forfarshire, United Kingdom.
Tiger	United Kingdom	The ship was wrecked in the Saltee Islands, County Wexford with the loss of 26 of the 30 people on board. She was on a voyage from Barbados to Liverpool, Lancashire.

=== Unknown date ===
List of shipwrecks: Unknown date in September 1819
Ship	State	Description
Ajax	United Kingdom	The ship was wrecked off Anegada, Virgin Islands with the loss of four of her crew.
Barilla	United States	The brig was wrecked on the Florida Reef. She was on a voyage from New York to Philadelphia, Pennsylvania.
Beaver	(United Kingdom of Great Britain and Ireland) British North America	The brig was wrecked on Red Island, Newfoundland in late September. All on board were rescued.
Canada	(United Kingdom of Great Britain and Ireland) British North America	The ship foundered in the Grand Banks of Newfoundland in early September. Her crew were rescued by Hannah (United Kingdom). Canada was on a voyage from Liverpool, Lancashire to Quebec City, Lower Canada, British North America.
Charles	United Kingdom	The sloop foundered with the loss of all hands. She was on a voyage from Liverpool, Lancashire to Chichester, Sussex.
Charlotte	United Kingdom	The ship struck rocks. She consequently put in to Stromness, Orkney Islands in a leaky condition.
George Washington	United States	The brig was wrecked on the Florida Reef. She was on a voyage from New York to New Orleans, Louisiana.
Governor Murray	(United Kingdom of Great Britain and Ireland) British Guiana	The ship was wrecked in the Atlantic Ocean before 28 September.
Hawk	United Kingdom	The ship sprang a leak in the North Sea and was abandoned. Her crew were rescued by Royalist.
Hercules	Portugal	The full-rigged ship was wrecked in the Bahamas in early September. She was on a voyage from Rio de Janeiro, Brazil to Lisbon.
Hoffnung	Stettin	The ship sprang a leak and was beached 2 Danish Miles (8.134 nautical miles (15.065 km)) from "Hioring" in early September. She was on a voyage from Stettin to Hamburg.
Lively	United States	The schooner was wrecked on the Florida Reef. She was on a voyage from New Orleans to Baltimore, Maryland.
Placentia	United States	The ship was wrecked at Schoodic Point, Maine. Her crew were rescued. She was on a voyage from Newfoundland, British North America to Bristol, Maine.
Union	United Kingdom	The ship was driven ashore on Apple Island, in the Saint Lawrence River. She was on a voyage from Kinsale, County Cork to Quebec City, Lower Canada, British North America.

== October ==
=== 2 October ===
List of shipwrecks: 2 October 1819
Ship	State	Description
Good Intent	United Kingdom	The ship ran aground and was wrecked in the Bay of Bulls. Her crew were rescued.
Northumberland	United Kingdom	The ship was wrecked at Port Medway, Nova Scotia, British North America with the loss of three of her crew. She was on a voyage from Liverpool, Lancashire to Liverpool, Nova Scotia.

=== 3 October ===
List of shipwrecks: 3 October 1819
Ship	State	Description
Adventure	United Kingdom	The ship was driven ashore on Cape Sable Island, Nova Scotia, British North America with the loss of a crew member. She was on a voyage from Cádiz, Spain to Saint John, New Bruswick, British North America.
Robert and Janet	United Kingdom	The ship was driven ashore and wrecked at Blakeney, Norfolk.

=== 5 October ===
List of shipwrecks: 5 October 1819
Ship	State	Description
Jane	United Kingdom	The ship was driven ashore and wrecked at Formby, Lancashire. Her crew were rescued. She was on a voyage from Wigton, Cumberland to Liverpool, Lancashire.
Rebecca	United Kingdom	The ship ran aground on the Cockle Sand, in the North Sea and lost her rudder. She was consequently driven ashore at Great Yarmouth, Norfolk. Rebecca was on a voyage from Onega, Russia to London. She was refloated on 20 October and taken in to Great Yarmouth.

=== 6 October ===
List of shipwrecks: 6 October 1819
Ship	State	Description
Charlotte	United Kingdom	The ship ran aground on Scroby Sands, Norfolk and sank. Her crew were rescued.
Due Amici	Russia	The ship was driven ashore at Genoa, Kingdom of Sardinia. She was later refloated.
Hoop	Norway	The galiot was driven ashore and wrecked on Texel, North Holland, Netherlands.
Liberty	United Kingdom	The ship ran aground on Scroby Sands.
Phœnix	Flag unknown	The galiot was wrecked near Camperduin, North Holland. She was on a voyage from Karlskrona, Sweden to Havre de Grâce, Seine Maritime, France.
Remark	United Kingdom	The ship ran aground on Scroby Sand and sank. Her crew were rescued.
Theodore de Jonge	Netherlands	The smack was driven ashore and wrecked on Texel.
Unnamed	Denmark	The ship was driven ashore at Nieuwpoort, West Flanders, Netherlands. Her crew were rescued. She floated off the next day.

=== 7 October ===
List of shipwrecks: 7 October 1819
Ship	State	Description
Elizabeth	United Kingdom	The ship was driven ashore in Table Bay, where she was subsequently wrecked. She was on a voyage from Bombay, India to London.
Goede Haab	Netherlands	The ship foundered in the North Sea off Callantsoog, North Holland. Her crew were rescued. She was on a voyage from "Longsound" to Falmouth, Cornwall, United Kingdom.
Maria Justine	Hamburg	The ship was lost near Gothenburg, Sweden. Her crew were rescued. She was on a voyage from Saint Petersburg, Russia to Hamburg.
Prince William I	Netherlands	The brig was beached at the Cape of Good Hope, Cape Colony.
Resolution	Flag unknown	The ship foundered in the North Sea off Vlieland, Friesland, Netherlands. Her crew were rescued. She was on a voyage from "Longsound" to Bordeaux, Gironde, France.
Three Brothers	United Kingdom	The ship ran aground at South Shields, County Durham. She was on a voyage from Quebec City, British North America to Sunderland, County Durham. She was refloated and resumed her voyage.
William	United Kingdom	The galiot was driven ashore and wrecked at Berck, Pas-de-Calais, France with the loss of one of her seven crew. She was on a voyage from Santander, Spain to London.

=== 9 October ===
List of shipwrecks: 9 October 1819
Ship	State	Description
Elizabeth	United Kingdom	The ship foundered in the Irish Sea. She was on a voyage from Cork to Liverpool, Lancashire.
Ganges	United Kingdom	The ship, which had sprung a leak on 30 September, was beached on Faial Island, Azores. She was on a voyage from Aberdeen to Saint John, New Brunswick, British North America.
Shawfield	United Kingdom	The ship was driven ashore at Wick, Caithness.
Triton	United Kingdom	The ship was driven ashore at Kronstadt, Russia. She was on a voyage from London to Saint Petersburg, Russia. Triton was later refloated and taken in to Kronstadt.
Unnamed	Flag unknown	The brig foundered in Carnarvon Bay.

=== 10 October ===
List of shipwrecks: 10 October 1819
Ship	State	Description
Caledonia	United Kingdom	The ship was abandoned in the Atlantic Ocean. She was on a voyage from Miramichi, New Brunswick, British North America to Grangemouth, Stirlingshire.
Fly	United Kingdom	The ship collided with the pier at Newhaven, Sussex and was consequently beached. She was on a voyage from Sunderland, County Durham to Newhaven.
Hoffnung	Sweden	The ship was lost near Harlingen, Friesland, Netherlands. She was on a voyage from Gothenburg to London, United Kingdom.
Maria Sophia	Sweden	The ship ran aground on the Long Sand, in the North Sea off the coast of Essex, United Kingdom. She was on a voyage from Gothenburg to Barcelona, Spain. She was refloated and tken in to Margate, Kent, United Kingdom.

=== 11 October ===
List of shipwrecks: 11 October 1819
Ship	State	Description
Albion	United Kingdom	The brig was wrecked on the Arklow Banks, in the Irish Sea off the coast of County Wicklow with the loss of all hands. She was on a voyage from Swansea, Glamorgan to Milford Haven, Pembrokeshire.

=== 12 October ===
List of shipwrecks: 12 October 1819
Ship	State	Description
Thetis	United Kingdom	The ship ran aground north of Robin Hoods Bay, Yorkshire and was wrecked.

=== 13 October ===
List of shipwrecks: 13 October 1819
Ship	State	Description
Greve Rosen	Sweden	The ship was driven ashore at Vlissingen, Zeeland, Netherlands. She was on a voyage from Uddevalla to Cádiz, Spain.

=== 14 October ===
List of shipwrecks: 14 October 1819
Ship	State	Description
Aid	United Kingdom	The ship was wrecked on the Swaverot Reef, in the Gulf of Riga. Her crew were rescued. She was on a voyage from Riga, Russia to Plymouth, Devon.
Better-luck	(United Kingdom of Great Britain and Ireland) Bermuda	The drogher was driven on to a reef off Bermuda in a hurricane.
Capelin	United Kingdom	The ship schooner was driven ashore and wrecked in Gull Cove, Newfoundland, British North America.
Elizabeth	(United Kingdom of Great Britain and Ireland) British North America	The schooner was driven ashore in a hurricane at Bermuda.
Elizabeth	(United Kingdom of Great Britain and Ireland) Bermuda	The drogher was driven on to a reef off Bermuda in a hurricane.
Elliot	(United Kingdom of Great Britain and Ireland) Bermuda	The sloop was driven ashore in a hurricane at Bermuda.
Endeavour	(United Kingdom of Great Britain and Ireland) Bermuda	The drogher was driven on to a reef off Bermuda in a hurricane.
Engineer	United Kingdom	The brig was driven ashore and wrecked on Bermuda in a hurricane.
Spectator	(United Kingdom of Great Britain and Ireland) British North America	The brig was driven ashore in a hurricane at Bermuda. Her crew were rescued.
Steer-me-well	(United Kingdom of Great Britain and Ireland) Bermuda	The drogher was driven on to a reef off Bermuda in a hurricane.
Three Sisters	(United Kingdom of Great Britain and Ireland) British Guiana	The schooner was driven ashore in a hurricane at Bermuda. She was on a voyage from Demerara to Saint Thomas, Virgin Islands.
Young Brilliant	United Kingdom	The ship was driven ashore on Stocking Island. She was on a voyage from Nassau, Bahamas to Jamaica.
Zaandam	Netherlands	The ship was abandoned off Bermuda in a hurricane.

=== 15 October ===
List of shipwrecks: 15 October 1819
Ship	State	Description
Enterprize	United Kingdom	The ship was wrecked on Cape Breton Island, Nova Scotia, British North America. She was on a voyage from Miramichi, New Brunswick, British North America to London.
Good Hoop	Portugal Brazil	The ship was driven ashore and wrecked at Maranhão.
Jackall	(United Kingdom of Great Britain and Ireland) Grenada	The drogher was wrecked in a hurricane at Grenada.
Sheffield	United Kingdom	The sloop was driven ashore at Wick, Caithness.

=== 16 October ===
List of shipwrecks: 16 October 1819
Ship	State	Description
Aid	United Kingdom	The ship struck a rock, capsized and was wrecked at Scalpay, Outer Hebrides. She was on a voyage from Riga, Russia to Londonderry.
Charlotte	United Kingdom	The ship was driven ashore and damaged at A Coruña, Spain. She was on a voyage from A Coruña to "Carril". Charlotte was later refloated, but was subsequently condemned.
Hope	United Kingdom	The ship departed from Waterford for Liverpool, Lancashire. No further trace, presumed foundered in the Irish Sea with the loss of all hands.
Mermaid	United Kingdom	The ship was abandoned whilst on a voyage from Prince Edward Island to St. John's, Newfoundland, British North America.
Ocean	United Kingdom	The ship foundered in the North Sea off St. Abbs Head, Berwickshire with the loss of all hands. She was on a voyage from Sunderland, County Durham to Aberdeen.

=== 17 October ===
List of shipwrecks: 17 October 1819
Ship	State	Description
Albion	United Kingdom	The ship was driven ashore and wrecked on Ameland, Friesland, Netherlands. She was on a voyage from Leith, Lothian to Hamburg.
Beaver	United Kingdom	The ship departed from Workington, Cumberland for an Irish port. No further trace, presumed foundered in the Irish Sea with the loss of all hands.
Lark	United Kingdom	The ship departed from Workington for an Irish port. No further trace, presumed foundered in the Irish Sea with the loss of all hands.
Patent	United Kingdom	The ship was driven ashore and severely damaged on the coast of Lincolnshire. She was on a voyage from Riga, Russia to Hull, Yorkshire. Patent was subsequently wrecked in a gale on 21 October.

=== 18 October ===
List of shipwrecks: 18 October 1819
Ship	State	Description
Caledonia	United Kingdom	The ship capsized in the Atlantic Ocean and was abandoned by her crew. The wreck came ashore at A Coruña, Spain on 26 December.
Remittance	United Kingdom	The ship sprang a leak in the Atlantic Ocean and was abandoned by her crew, who were rescued by Atlantic (United Kingdom). Remittance was on a voyage from Miramichi Bay to Liverpool, Lancashire.
Venus	United Kingdom	The ship struck the Cross Sand, in the North Sea off the coast of Suffolk and foundered. Her crew were rescued. She was on a voyage from South Shields, County Durham to London.

=== 19 October ===
List of shipwrecks: 19 October 1819
Ship	State	Description
Delaford	United Kingdom	The ship ran aground and was severely damaged in the River Thames at Erith, Kent. She was on a voyage from London to Saint Vincent. Delaford was refloated and out back to London for repairs.
Enterprize	United Kingdom	The ship was abandoned in the Atlantic Ocean (45°43′N 56°21′W). Her crew were rescued by Mary (United Kingdom). Enterprize was on a voyage from New Brunswick to Newfoundland, British North America.
Venus	United Kingdom	The ship was driven ashore at Naples. She was on a voyage from Newfoundland, British North America to Alicante, Spain.

=== 20 October ===
List of shipwrecks: 20 October 1819
Ship	State	Description
Eleanor	United Kingdom	The ship departed from Marske-by-the-Sea, Yorkshire. No further trace, presumed foundered in the North Sea with the loss of all hands.
Jane	United Kingdom	The ship foundered in the English Channel off Beachy Head, Sussex. Her crew were rescued. She was on a voyage from Sunderland, County Durham to Weymouth, Dorset.

=== 21 October ===
List of shipwrecks: 21 October 1819
Ship	State	Description
Anna	Netherlands	The ship was driven ashore at Hellevoetsluis, South Holland. She was refloated on 23 October and resumed her voyage from Batavia, Netherlands East Indies to Rotterdam, South Holland.
Feniscowles (or Fenniscowles)	United Kingdom	The ship was driven ashore and wrecked at Green Point, Cape of Good Hope, Cape Colony. All on board were rescued. She was on a voyage from Bengal, India to Mauritius and Liverpool, Lancashire. A midshipman and four sailors from HMS Conway drowned when their boat swamped while coming alongside Feniscowles.
Hare	United States	The brig foundered in the Atlantic Ocean in a hurricane. Her crew were rescued.
Hannah	United Kingdom	The ship sank at Whitby. She was refloated but was a total loss.
Jane	United Kingdom	The ship was driven ashore and wrecked at Marske-by-the-Sea, Yorkshire.
Lady Clair	United States	The ship was lost in the Abaco Islands. Her crew were rescued. She was on a voyage from New York to Havana, Cuba.
Laurel	United Kingdom	The ship was presumed to have foundered in the Irish Sea with the loss of all hands. She was on a voyage from Cork to London.
Marshland	United Kingdom	The brig was driven against the quayside at Newhaven, Sussex.
Patent	United Kingdom	The ship was driven ashore and wrecked on the coast of Lincolnshire. She was on a voyage from Riga, Russia to Hull, Yorkshire.
Susan	United Kingdom	The ship was driven ashore and severely damaged at Whitby.
Unnamed	United Kingdom	The sloop sank in the Humber at Ferriby Sluice, Lincolnshire. She was on a voyage from Hull to Gainsborough, Lincolnshire.

=== 22 October ===
List of shipwrecks: 22 October 1819
Ship	State	Description
Blossom	United Kingdom	The ship was driven ashore and severely damaged at Dimlington, Yorkshire. She was on a voyage from King's Lynn, Norfolk to the Firth of Forth. She was later refloated and taken in to Bridlington, Yorkshire, where she arrived on 18 December.
British Isle	United Kingdom	The ship was driven ashore at Waterford.
Caledonia	United Kingdom	The ship was abandoned in the Atlantic Ocean (49°32′N 7°50′W). Her crew were rescued by Portland (United States). Caledonia was on a voyage from Miramichi, New Brunswick, British North America to Grangemouth, Stirlingshire. She came ashore and was wrecked at A Coruña, Spain on 26 December.
Commerce	United Kingdom	The sloop was driven ashore at Margate, Kent. She was on a voyage from Chester, Cheshire to London. Commerce was refloated on 25 October and taken in to Margate.
Dolphin	United Kingdom	The ship capsized during a squall in the Atlantic Ocean with the loss of all but three of her crew. She was on a voyage from Jamaica to Halifax, Nova Scotia, British North America.
Duchess of Buccleugh	United Kingdom	The ship was driven ashore near Stornoway, Isle of Lewis. She was on a voyage from Gothenburg, Sweden to Killala, County Mayo. She was later refloated and taken in to Stornoway.
Eclipse	United Kingdom	The schooner was driven ashore and wrecked at Sunderland, County Durham.
Elizabeth	United Kingdom	The ship sprang a leak in the North Sea 5 nautical miles (9.3 km) off Bridlingdon, Yorkshire and was abandoned by her crew before she foundered.
Hannah	United Kingdom	The ship was driven ashore at Liverpool. She was on a voyage from Liverpool to Antigua. She was refloated the next day.
HDMS Harriet Doris	Royal Danish Navy	The ship was wrecked in a hurricane at St. Thomas, Virgin Islands.
Lady Leith	United Kingdom	The ship was driven on to the Nore. She was on a voyage from Saint Lucia to London. Lady Leith was refloated and taken in to Sheerness, Kent.
Mary	United Kingdom	The ship foundered in the Irish Sea with the loss of one of the five people on board. Survivors were rescued by the pilot boat No. 11 (United Kingdom). Mary was on a voyage from Ulverston, to Liverpool, Lancashire.
Nautilus	United Kingdom	The ship was driven ashore and wrecked at Sunderland, County Durham.
HDMS Patriot	Royal Danish Navy	The schooner was driven ashore and wrecked at St. Thomas.
Robert	United Kingdom	The ship was driven ashore at Étaples, Pas-de-Calais, France. She was on a voyage from Plymouth, Devon to Sunderland. She had been refloated by 24 October.
Thomas and Ann	United Kingdom	The sloop foundered in Liverpool Bay with the loss of all hands. She was on a voyage from Liverpool to Ulverston, Lancashire.
Victory	United Kingdom	The steamship was driven ashore at Margate. She was later refloated and taken in to Margate.
Unnamed	United Kingdom	The sloop foundered in Liverpool Bay.
Unnamed	France	The boat was wrecked on the Foreness Rock, Margate with the loss of all hands.
Unnamed	United Kingdom	The fishing boat foundered off the north Devon coast with the loss of all seven crew.
Unnamed	United Kingdom	The fishing boat foundered off the coast of Norfolk with the loss of all four crew.

=== 23 October ===
List of shipwrecks: 23 October 1819
Ship	State	Description
Aid	United Kingdom	The sloop was driven ashore and wrecked at Peterhead, Aberdeenshire.
Apollo	United Kingdom	The ship departed from Whitehaven, Cumberland for Dublin. No further trace, presuimed foundered in the Irish Sea with the loss of all hands.
Commerce	United Kingdom	The brig was wrecked on the Herd Sand, in the North Sea off South Shields, County Durham. Her crew were rescued by the South Shields Lifeboat. She was on a voyage from South Shields to Cromarty.
Elizabeth	United Kingdom	The ship was wrecked at the Cape of Good Hope, Cape Colony. Her crew were rescued.
Industry	United Kingdom	The sloop was driven ashore and wrecked at Rottenslough, Aberdeenshire. Her crew were rescued.
Jeune Pierre	Netherlands	The ship was driven ashore 2 nautical miles (3.7 km) east of Ostend, West Flanders. Her crew were rescued. She was on a voyage from Ostend to London, United Kingdom. Jeune Pierre was later refloated and taken in to Ostend.
Victoire	France	The ship was wrecked at Dunkerque, Nord. Her crew were rescued. She was on a voyage from St. Ubes, Portugal to Dunkerque.

=== 24 October ===
List of shipwrecks: 24 October 1819
Ship	State	Description
Adonis	United Kingdom	The brig was driven ashore and wrecked at Kinnaird Head, near Fraserburgh, Aberdeenshire with the loss of all hands.
Amethyst	United Kingdom	The ship was lost in Tongue Bay. Her crew were rescued. She was on a voyage from Thurso, Caithness to Liverpool, Lancashire.
Eclipse	United Kingdom	The schooner was driven ashore at Sunderland, County Durham.
William Pitt	United Kingdom	The ship ran aground. She was on a voyage from Liverpool to Sligo. She was refloated and put in to Killough, County Down in a severely leaky condition.

=== 25 October ===
List of shipwrecks: 25 October 1819
Ship	State	Description
Actress	United States	The ship was driven ashore at Sandy Hook, New Jersey. She was on a voyage from Amboy to Gibraltar.
Eliza	United Kingdom	The ship sprang a leak and foundered off The Smalls. Her crew were rescued. She was on a voyage from Swansea, Glamorgan to Waterford.
Hope	United Kingdom	The ship was driven ashore at Banff, Aberdeenshire with the loss of a crew member. She was on a voyage from Riga, Russia to Londonderry.

=== 26 October ===
List of shipwrecks: 26 October 1818
Ship	State	Description
Daphne	United Kingdom	The brig was driven onto rocks off East Island, Tasmania, in the Kent Group and wrecked. All thirteen people on board survived. She was on a voyage from Port Jackson to India.
Elizabeth	United Kingdom	The ship sprang a leak and foundered in the North Sea. Her crew survived.
Elizabeth	United Kingdom	The ship collided with another vessel off Great Yarmouth, Norfolk and was severely damaged. She was on a voyage from Arkhangelsk, Russia to Hull, Yorkshire. She was taken in to Great Yarmouth by a salvage smack.
Fidelity	United Kingdom	The ship foundered in the North Sea off the mouth of the River Tees.
Jean	United Kingdom	The ship capsized in the Atlantic Ocean during a squall. Her crew were rescued on 30 October by Ythan (United Kingdom). Jean was on a voyage from Quebec City, Lower Canada, British North America to Shoreham-by-Sea, Sussex.
Pilot	United Kingdom	The ship foundered in the Bristol Channel off Aberthaw, Glamorgan. Her crew were rescued. She was on a voyage from Liverpool, Lancashire to Bristol, Gloucestershire.
Theodore	United Kingdom	The ship was lost near St. John's, Newfoundland, British North America. Her crew were rescued. She was on a voyage from Liverpool to Newfoundland.
Unison	United Kingdom	The ship was driven ashore on Götaland, Sweden. She was on a voyage from Saint Petersburg, Russia to London. Unison was wrecked in mid-November.
Vrow Klasena	Netherlands	The ship was lost off Terschelling, Friesland. Her crew were rescued. She was on a voyage from Christiansand, Norway to Harlingen, Friesland.
Two unnamed vessels	United Kingdom	The colliers were driven ashore at Happisburgh, Norfolk.

=== 27 October ===
List of shipwrecks: 27 October 1819
Ship	State	Description
Elizabeth	United Kingdom	The ship departed from Gravesend, Kent for Antwerp, Netherlands. No further trace, presumed foundered with the loss of all hands.
Fortune	United Kingdom	The brig was wrecked in Dunbar Bay. Her crew survived. She was on a voyage from Saint Petersburg, Russia to Leith, Lothian.
Vrow Byna	Netherlands	The ship sprang a leak and was beached near Thisted, Denmark. She was on a voyage from Amsterdam, North Holland, to Drøbach, Norway.

=== 28 October ===
List of shipwrecks: 28 October 1819
Ship	State	Description
Aid	United Kingdom	The ship was wrecked at Peterhead, Aberdeenshire.
Zeemeeuw	Netherlands	The ship ran aground off Brielle, South Holland. She was on a voyage from Brielle to Surinam.

=== 29 October ===
List of shipwrecks: 29 October 1819
Ship	State	Description
Alert	United Kingdom	The sloop was driven ashore and wrecked at Orford, Suffolk. She was on a voyage from Faversham, Kent to Newcastle upon Tyne, Northumberland.
Trumfo do Mar	Portugal Brazil	The ship was wrecked at Faial Island, Azores, Portugal. Her crew were rescued.

=== 30 October ===
List of shipwrecks: 30 October 1819
Ship	State	Description
Eliza	United Kingdom	The ship was driven ashore at Bridlington, Yorkshire.
Eliza	United Kingdom	The ship was driven ashore at Whitby, Yorkshire. Her crew were rescued.
George	United Kingdom	The ship was driven ashore at Bridlington.
Hector	United Kingdom	The ship was driven ashore at Beaumaris, Anglesey. She was on a voyage from New York, United States to Liverpool, Lancashire. She was later refloated.
Providence	United Kingdom	The ship ran aground on the Herd Sand, in the North Sea off South Shields, County Durham. Her crew were rescued. She was on a voyage from Berwick-upon-Tweed, Northumberland to London. Providence was later refloated and taken in to South Shields.
Union	United Kingdom	The ship was driven ashore at Bridlington. She was later refloated and taken in to Bridlington.
Waltham	United Kingdom	The ship capsized in the Atlantic Ocean and was abandoned. She was on a voyage from Trinidad to Bermuda.

=== 31 October ===
List of shipwrecks: 31 October 1819
Ship	State	Description
Frindsbury	United Kingdom	The ship was driven ashore and damaged in the Montmorency River, British North America. She was later refloated and taken in to Wolf Cove, Newfoundland, British North America.
John & Caroline	Danzig	The ketch was drivern ashore near Wolferton, Norfolk, United Kingdom. She was on a voyage from Danzig to Bordeaux, Gironde, France. John and Caroline was refloated on 6 November and taken in to King's Lynn, Norfolk.

=== Unknown date ===
List of shipwrecks: Unknown date in October 1819
Ship	State	Description
Albion	United Kingdom	The ship was wrecked on the Dutch coast.
Alderney	United Kingdom	The ship ran agroud and severely damaged on the West Rocks, in the North Sea off the coast of Essex. She was on a voyage from Saint Petersburg, Russia to London. Alderney was refloated on 28 October and taken in to Harwich in a waterlogged condition.
Amiable	United States	The ship ran aground at the mouth of the River Shannon before 5 October. She was on a voyage from Philadelphia, Pennsylvania to Limerick. Amiable was refloated but declared beyond repair on arrival at Limerick.
Ann	(United Kingdom of Great Britain and Ireland) Saint Lucia	The drogher was wrecked in a hurricane at Saint Lucia.
Anna	Kingdom of Hanover	The ship was lost whilst on a voyage from Pillau, Prussia to Emden.
Aurora	Kingdom of Hanover	The ship foundered off Arendal, Norway. She was on a voyage from Stockholm, Sweden to the Ems.
Aurora	United Kingdom	The brig was lost in the Caicos Islands in late October.
Britannia	United Kingdom	The ship foundered in the North Sea off Stockton-on-Tees, Yorkshire with the loss of all hands. She was on a voyage from Aberdeen to London.
Castor	Danzig	The ship foundered in the Atlantic Ocean off the Inishtrahull Lighthouse, County Donegal. She was on a voyage from Liverpool, Lancashire, United Kingdom to Danzig.
Christina Maria	Sweden	The ship was driven ashore near Amrum, Duchy of Holstein. She was on a voyage from Stockholm to Bremen.
Diana	United Kingdom	The ship was wrecked at British Honduras before 21 October. She was on a voyage from British Honduras to London.
Factor	United States	The ship foundered whilst on a voyage from Havre de Grâce, Seine-Inférieure, France to New York.
Frau Ida	Duchy of Schleswig	The ship was wrecked near "Klittermolen/Kittlemolen". She was on a voyage from Amsterdam, North Holland, Netherlands to Flensburg.
Herald	United Kingdom	The ship was wrecked at British Honduras. She was on a voyage from British Honduras to London.
Integrity	United Kingdom	The ship was abandoned in the North Sea off Dimlington, Yorkshire. She was discovered by Cygnus and another collier (both United Kingdom) and taken in to Harwich, Essex, where she arrived on 25 October.
Janet Turner	United Kingdom	The sloop departed from the Water of Orr for Liverpool at the end of October. No further trace, presumed foundered with the loss of all hands.
Jennies and Margaret	United Kingdom	The ship was wrecked on the Dutchman Sand, in the Irish Sea off Beaumaris, Anglesey. Her crew were rescued.
Karen Hedwig	Denmark	The ship foundered in the North Sea off the north coast of Jutland.
Leopoldine	Portugal	The ship was wrecked at Lisbon at the end of October. Her crew were rescued. She was on a voyage from Bahia, Brazil to Lisbon.
Margaret	United States	The ship was lost whilst on a voyage from Charleston, South Carolina to Havana, Cuba.
Navigator	United Kingdom	The ship was lost in the Caicos Islands in late October. Her crew were rescued. She was on a voyage from Halifax, Nova Scotia, British North America to Jamaica.
Neptune	France	The brig was abandoned in the English Channel. She was discovered on 10 October in a wrecked state by HMS Dover (Royal Navy) and taken in to Newhaven, Sussex, United Kingdom.
Susan	United Kingdom	The brig was lost near Portobelo, Colombia in late October. Her crew were rescued.
Urania	United Kingdom	The ship was driven ashore and wrecked at Berwick-upon-Tweed, Northumberland. She was on a voyage from Arkhangelsk, Russia to London.

== November ==
=== 2 November ===
List of shipwrecks: 2 November 1819
Ship	State	Description
Christian	United Kingdom	The ship struck a rock off the west coast of Skye and foundered. Her crew survived. She was on a voyage from Riga, Russia to Wyre Water.
Nestor	United Kingdom	The ship sprang a leak and was abandoned in the North Sea off Lindesnes, Norway (56°48′N 5°28′E). Her crew were rescued by Triton (United Kingdom). Nestor was on a voyage from Memel, Prussia to King's Lynn, Norfolk. Nestor was subsequently taken in to "Frederickswern".
Northumberland	United Kingdom	The ship was lost off Hogland, Russia. Her crew survived. She was on a voyage from Saint Petersburg, Russia to London.
Unnamed	Prussia	The praam sank at Pillau.

=== 3 November ===
List of shipwrecks: 3 November 1819
Ship	State	Description
Adventure	United Kingdom	The ship was wrecked on Cape Sable Island, Nova Scotia, British North America with the loss of a crew member. She was on a voyage from Cádiz, Spain to Saint John, New Brunswick, British North America.

=== 4 November ===
List of shipwrecks: 4 November 1819
Ship	State	Description
Concord	United Kingdom	The ship caught fire off Bognor, Sussex and was scuttled. She was on a voyage from London to Lyme, Dorset. She was subsequently taken in to Portsmouth, Hampshire in a severely damaged condition.
Flora	Netherlands	The ship was driven ashore at Memel, Prussia.

=== 5 November ===
List of shipwrecks: 5 November 1819
Ship	State	Description
Endeavour	United Kingdom	The ship struck the pier and sank at Liverpool, Lancashire. She was on a voyage from Newry, County Antrim to Liverpool.
William	United Kingdom	The ship sprang a leak and was beached at "Riedenhof", Prussia. Her crew were rescued by August Wilhelm ( Danzig). She was on a voyage from Liebau, Prussia to Harwich, Essex.

=== 6 November ===
List of shipwrecks: 6 November 1819
Ship	State	Description
Anne	United Kingdom	The ship departed from Saint John, New Brunswick, British North America for Aberdeen. No further trace, presumed foundered with the loss of all eleven crew.
Daphne	United Kingdom	The brig was wrecked at Banff, Aberdeenshire. Her crew were rescued. She was on a voyage from Sunderland, County Durham to Banff.
Laurel	United Kingdom	The ship was wrecked near Turku, Grand Duchy of Finland. Her crew were rescued. She was on a voyage from Leith, Lothian to Saint Petersburg, Russia.

=== 7 November ===
List of shipwrecks: 7 November 1819
Ship	State	Description
Maria	United Kingdom	The ship ran aground off Falsterbo, Sweden. She was on a voyage from Danzig to an English port. She was later refloated.

=== 8 November ===
List of shipwrecks: 8 November 1819
Ship	State	Description
Carron	Sweden	The ship was lost north of Memel, Prussia.
Emulation	United States	The ship was wrecked on Willoughby's Point. She was on a voyage from New York to Virginia.
Friendship	United Kingdom	The sloop foundered off The Smalls. Her crew were rescued by Severn (United Kingdom). Friendship was on a voyage from Bearhaven, County Kerry to Swansea, Glamorgan.
Nile	United Kingdom	The ship was driven ashore in the Saint Lawrence River downstream of Trois-Rivières, Lower Canada, British North America. She was on a voyage from Quebec City, Lower Canada to Liverpool, Lancashire.
Paragon	United Kingdom	The brig was wrecked in the Strait of Belle Isle with the loss of eight of her eleven crew. She was on a voyage from Quebec, British North America to the Clyde.

=== 9 November ===
List of shipwrecks: 9 November 1819
Ship	State	Description
Agno	United Kingdom	The ship foundered off Hogland, Russia. Her crew were rescued by Amalthea (United Kingdom) and a Russian vessel. Agno was on a voyage from London to Saint Petersburg, Russia.
Friendship	United Kingdom	The ship foundered off The Smalls. Her crew were rescued by Severn (United Kingdom). Friendship was on a voyage from Kinsale, County Cork to Swansea, Glamorgan.

=== 10 November ===
List of shipwrecks: 10 November 1819
Ship	State	Description
Amiable	United Kingdom	The ship foundered in the Mediterranean Sea 70 nautical miles (130 km) off Malta. Her crew were rescued by Norfolk (United Kingdom).
Fortune	United Kingdom	The ship was driven ashore and wrecked west of Dunbar, Lothian. Her crew were rescued. She was on a voyage from Fraserburgh, Aberdeenshire to Leith, Lothian.
Paris	United Kingdom	The ship was driven ashore at Beaumaris, Anglesey. She was on a voyage from Richibucto, New Brunswick, British North America to Lancaster, Lancashire.

=== 11 November ===
List of shipwrecks: 11 November 1819
Ship	State	Description
Glutton	United Kingdom	The ship was driven ashore. She was on a voyage from British Honduras to Hull, Yorkshire. She was refloated and taken in to Harwich, Essex.
Salacia	United Kingdom	The brig was driven ashore at North Somercotes, Lincolnshire. Her crew were rescued.
Shannon	United Kingdom	The ship was lost in Portland West Bay, Dorset. She was on a voyage from Poole, Dorset to Milford Haven, Pembrokeshire.
William and Ann	United Kingdom	The ship sprang a leak off Cromer and was beached at Mundesley, Norfolk. She was on a voyage from Louth, Lincolnshire to London.
Unnamed	United States	The brig was wrecked on the Arklow Banks, in the Irish Sea off the coast of County Wicklow, United Kingdom with the loss of all hands.

=== 12 November ===
List of shipwrecks: 12 November 1819
Ship	State	Description
Liberty	United Kingdom	The ship was wrecked near Karlskrona, Sweden.

=== 13 November ===
List of shipwrecks: 13 November 1819
Ship	State	Description
Graff Bernstorff	Norway	The ship was driven ashore in the River Thames downstream of Gravesend, Kent, United Kingdom. She was on a voyage from Drammen, Norway to London, United Kingdom.
Harriet	United Kingdom	The ship departed from Norfolk, Virginia, United States for Portsmouth, Hampshire. No further trace, presumed foundered with the loss of all hands.

=== 14 November ===
List of shipwrecks: 14 November 1819
Ship	State	Description
Ann	United Kingdom	The ship was wrecked at Cape Henry, Haiti. Her crew were rescued. She was on a voyage from London to Cape Henry.
City of Norwich	United Kingdom	The schooner was driven ashore and wrecked at Saltfleet, Lincolnshire. Her crew were rescued. She was on a voyage from Great Yarmouth, Norfolk to Newcastle upon Tyne, Northumberland.
Hibernia	United Kingdom	The ship departed from Miramichi Bay for Maryport, Cumberland. No further trace, presumed foundered with the loss of all hands.
Oakhampton	United Kingdom	The ship ran aground on the Haisborough Sands, in the North Sea off the coast of Norfolk. She was refloated wit assistance and taken in to Great Yarmouth.
Salacia	United Kingdom	The brig was driven ashore at North Somercotes, Lincolnshire.

=== 15 November ===
List of shipwrecks: 15 November 1819
Ship	State	Description
Ann	United Kingdom	The ship was wrecked on the Skager Reef. She was on a voyage from Saint Petersburg, Russia to Hull, Yorkshire.
Pelican	United Kingdom	The ship was driven ashore between Castellón de la Plana and Peniscola, Spain. She was on a voyage from Salon-de-Provence, Bouches-du-Rhône, France to London.
Vertumnus	United Kingdom	The ship was driven ashore on St Nicholas Island, Devon. She was on a voyage from Liverpool, Lancashire to Plymouth, Devon. She was refloated and taken in to Plymouth.

=== 16 November ===
List of shipwrecks: 16 November 1819
Ship	State	Description
Cecilia Wilhelmina	Denmark	The brig was wrecked near Cette, Hérault, France.
Edward and Ann	United Kingdom	The fishing boat was run into by Henry (United Kingdom) and sank off Corton, Suffolk with the loss of two lives
Ocean	United Kingdom	The ship foundered off St. Abbs Head, Berwickshire with the loss of all hands. She was on a voyage from Sunderland, County Durham to Aberdeen.

=== 17 November ===
List of shipwrecks: 17 November 1819
Ship	State	Description
Brothers	United Kingdom	The ship sprang a leak and was abandoned. She was on a voyage from Harrington, Cumberland to Kirkcudbright.
Hope	United Kingdom	The ship was driven ashore at Great Yarmouth, Norfolk. She was on a voyage from Ipswich, Suffolk to Newcastle upon Tyne, Northumberland. Hope was later refloated and taken in to Great Yarmouth for repairs.
Isabella	United Kingdom	The ship was severely damaged at Bridlington, Yorkshire.
Reserve	United States	The ship foundered in the Gulf of Mexico. Her crew were rescued. She was on a voyage from Bath, Maine to Martinique.
Success	Sweden	The brig was wrecked at "St. Filien".
Swallow	United Kingdom	The ship was lost near Veracruz, Viceroyalty of New Granada. She was on a voyage from Málaga, Spain to Veracruz.

=== 18 November ===
List of shipwrecks: 18 November 1819
Ship	State	Description
Emperor Alexander	United Kingdom	The ship was driven ashore and wrecked at Orfordness, Suffolk with the loss of two of her crew. She was on a voyage from Saint Petersburg, Russia to London.
Endeavour	United Kingdom	The ship was driven ashore and wrecked at St Ginnis, Cornwall with the loss of all three crew.
Harriet	United Kingdom	The ship departed from Norfolk, Virginia, United States for Portsmouth, Hampshire. No further trace, presumed foundered with the loss of all hands. f
Rising Sun	United Kingdom	The ship ran aground on the Kentish Knock. She was refloated and taken in to Whitstable, Kent.
St. Vincent	United Kingdom	The ship ran ashore near the Red Nose. She was on a voyage from Liverpool, Lancashire to Cork. She was refloated and resumed her voyage.

=== 19 November ===
List of shipwrecks: 19 November 1819
Ship	State	Description
Speculator	United Kingdom	The ship was holed by her anchor and beached at Wainfleet, Lincolnshire.

=== 20 November ===
List of shipwrecks: 20 November 1819
Ship	State	Description
Caledonia	United Kingdom	The steamboat was severely damaged by fire at Dundee, Forfarshire.
Lee	United Kingdom	The ship was driven ashore between Maryport and Workington, Cumberland.
Thomas & Ann	United Kingdom	The ship was driven ashore and wrecked at Marske-by-Sea, Yorkshire.
William and John	United Kingdom	The ship ran aground at Lindisfarne, Northumberland. She was refloated and taken in to South Shields, County Durham in a leaky condition.
Unnamed	United States	The brig was wrecked on Sapelo Island, Georgia. She was on a voyage from Guadeloupe to Charleston, South Carolina.

=== 21 November ===
List of shipwrecks: 21 November 1819
Ship	State	Description
Aurora	(United Kingdom of Great Britain and Ireland) Guernsey	The ship was lost near Ouessant, Finistère, France. She was on a voyage from Arichat, Nova Scotia, British North America to Guernsey.
Betsey	United Kingdom	The ship was driven ashore and damaged in the Isles of Scilly. She was on a voyage from Newhaven, Sussex to Liverpool, Lancashire.
Bridgeway	United Kingdom	The ship struck the pier and was damaged at Whitby, Yorkshire.
Friends	United Kingdom	The ship was driven ashore and severely damaged at Whitby.
Hannah	United Kingdom	The ship struck the pier and sank at Whitby. She was a total loss.
Hortense	United Kingdom	The ship was driven ashore at Ostend, West Flanders, Netherlands, where she was wrecked the next day. She was on a voyage from Liverpool to Ostend.
John & Mary	United Kingdom	The ship was driven ashore and damaged at Whitby.
Mary	Flag unknown	The ship was driven ashore at an unknown location within the Isles of Scilly. She was on a voyage from London to Cork. Mary was later refloated.
Minerva	Netherlands	The ship was holed by her anchor and sank at Livorno, Grand Duchy of Tuscany. She was on a voyage from Amsterdam, North Holland to Genoa, Kingdom of Sardinia and Livorno.
Providence	United Kingdom	The ship was wrecked on the south east point of Götaland, Sweden. She was on a voyage from Riga, Russia to Dundee, Forfarshire.
Susan	United Kingdom	The ship was driven ashore and severely damaged at Whitby.
Troshat	Norway	The ship departed from Newcastle upon Tyne, Northumberland, United Kingdom for Bergen. No further trace, presumed foundered in the North Sea with the loss of all hands.
Valiant	United Kingdom	The ship was wrecked on the Irish coast with the loss of a crew member. She was on a voyage from Kilrush, County Antrim to Glasgow, Renfrewshire.
William	United Kingdom	The ship was driven ashore at Dunnet, Caithness. She was on a voyage from Saint Petersburg, Russia to Liverpool, Lancashire.
Zenobia	United Kingdom	The ship was in collision with Carolina Matilda (Flag unknown) in the River Thames and was beached at Gravesend, Kent. Zenobia was later refloated.

=== 22 November ===
List of shipwrecks: 22 November 1819
Ship	State	Description
Eliza	United Kingdom	The ship was wrecked on near Cimbershamn, Sweden. Her crew were rescued. She was on a voyage from Memel, Prussia to Plymouth, Devon.
Emilie	United Kingdom	The ship was driven ashore at Havana, Cuba.
William Sibbald	United Kingdom	The brig struck a sandbank off Great Yarmouth, Norfolk and was abandoned by her crew. She was on a voyage from Saint Petersburg, Russia to London.

=== 23 November ===
List of shipwrecks: 23 November 1819
Ship	State	Description
Aberdeenshire	United Kingdom	The ship ran aground on the Black Middens, in the North Sea of the coast of County Durham and was wrecked. She was on a voyage from Peterhead, Aberdeenshire to South Shields, County Durham.
Bridget	United Kingdom	The ship was wrecked on the Shipwash Sand, in the North Sea. Her crew were rescued.
Emilie	Spain	The ship was driven ashore at Havana, Cuba and was wrecked.
Euphan	United Kingdom	The ship ran aground on the Shipwash Sand. Her crew were rescued. She was subsequently driven ashore and wrecked at Great Yarmouth, Norfolk. Euphan was on a voyage from the Firth of Forth to London.
Helena Wilhelmina	Prussia	The ship was driven ashore at Køge, Denmark. She was on a voyage from Königsburg to Amsterdam, North Holland, Netherlands.
Herstelling	Netherlands	The hoy was driven ashore at Petten, North Holland. Her crew were rescued. She was on a voyage from Christiansand, Norway to Harlingen, Friesland.
Lavinia	United Kingdom	The brig was driven ashore at Petten. Her crew were rescued. She was on a voyage from London to Amsterdam, North Holland.
Two Vrienden	Prussia	The schooner was driven ashore at Petten with the loss of all hands. She was on a voyage from Liebau to Schiedam, South Holland.
Waakzaamheid	Netherlands	The smack was driven ashore near Petten. Her crew were rescued. She was on a voyage from "Witsteen" to Harlingen.

=== 24 November ===
List of shipwrecks: 24 November 1819
Ship	State	Description
Royal Briton	United Kingdom	The ship was driven ashore and wrecked on Holmen, Denmark. Her crew were rescued. She was on a voyage from Oulu, Grand Duchy of Finland to Hull, Yorkshire.
Three Friends	Hamburg	The ship was lost at Madeira.

=== 25 November ===
List of shipwrecks: 25 November 1819
Ship	State	Description
James	United Kingdom	The ship was driven ashore near Kiel, Duchy of Holstein. She was on a voyage from Boston, Lincolnshire to Kiel.
Jong Jan	Netherlands	The ship was beached at Ostend, West Flanders. She was on a voyage from Liverpool, Lancashire, United Kingdom to Ostend. Jong Jan was refloated on 2 December and taken in to Ostend.
Thetis	United Kingdom	The ship was wrecked in Broadhaven Bay. She was on a voyage from London to Sligo.
Unnamed	Sweden	The galiot foundered in the English Channel off Calais, France with the loss of all hands.

=== 26 November ===
List of shipwrecks: 26 November 1819
Ship	State	Description
Pitt	United Kingdom	The sloop was wrecked at Guernsey, Channel Islands. She was on voyage from Jersey, Channel Islands to Falmouth, Cornwall.
Sir Godfrey Webster	United Kingdom	The ship was driven ashore at Folkestone, Kent. She was on a voyage from London to Jamaica. Sir Godfrey Webster was later refloated and put into Portsmouth, Hampshire for repairs.

=== 27 November ===
List of shipwrecks: 27 November 1819
Ship	State	Description
Columbus	Sweden	The ship was wrecked near Christianopel. She was on a voyage from Kalmar to Hamburg.
Isabella	United Kingdom	The ship lost her rudder and was abandoned in the Atlantic Ocean. Her crew were rescued by Belmont (United Kingdom). Isabella was on a voyage from Virginia, United States to Portsmouth, Hampshire.

=== 28 November ===
List of shipwrecks: 28 November 1819
Ship	State	Description
Hope	United Kingdom	The collier, a brig, was driven ashore and wrecked at Saltdean, Sussex. Her crew were rescued.
Providence Success	United Kingdom	The ship departed from Saint John, New Brunswick, British North America for Maryport, Cumberland. No further trace, presumed foundered with the loss of all hands.
Unnamed	United Kingdom	The West Indiaman was driven ashore and wrecked east of Rottingdean, Sussex with the loss of sixteen of her eighteen crew.

=== 29 November ===
List of shipwrecks: 29 November 1819
Ship	State	Description
Hope	United Kingdom	The ship was wrecked at Saltdean, Sussex. Her crew were rescued.
Margaret	United Kingdom	The ship was wrecked off Bermuda. She was on a voyage from Havana, Cuba to Gibraltar.
Mary Ann	United Kingdom	The ship was wrecked with the loss of seven lives. She was on a voyage from Newry, County Antrim to Preston, Lancashire.
Ocean	(United Kingdom of Great Britain and Ireland) British North America	The brig was driven ashore and wrecked near the Birling Gap, Sussex with the loss of two of the six or seven people on board. She was on a voyage from Demerara to London.
Sarah	United Kingdom	The ship was driven ashore at Lowestoft, Suffolk. Her crew were rescued. She was on a voyage from Memel, Prussia to Plymouth, Devon. Sarah was later refloated and taken in to Great Yarmouth, Norfolk.
Sun	United Kingdom	The ship capsized and sank near Hull, Yorkshire. She was on a voyage from Great Yarmouth, Norfolk to Leeds, Yorkshire.
William	United Kingdom	The ship was driven ashore at Sandown, Isle of Wight. She was on a voyage from Danzig to Portsmouth, Hampshire.

=== 30 November ===
List of shipwrecks: 30 November 1819
Ship	State	Description
Agenoria	United Kingdom	The ship was wrecked in the Atlantic Ocean with the loss of three lives. Six survivors were rescued on 6 December by Alexander (United Kingdom). Agenoria was on a voyage from Quebec, British North America to Bridgwater, Somerset.
Betsey	United Kingdom	The ship departed from Harrington Harbour, Quebec for an Irish port. No further trace, presumed foundered with the loss of all hands.
Joseph and Samuel	United Kingdom	The ship was wrecked on the Spanish Battery Rocks, in the North Sea off Tynemouth, Northumberland. Her crew were rescued.
Margarita	Malta	The ship struck rocks at Draget Point, Malta and foundered. Her crew were rescued. She was on a voyage from Alexandria, Egypt to Malta.
Mary Ann	United Kingdom	The ship was wrecked near Carlingford, County Louth with the loss of seven of the nine people on board. She was on a voyage from Preston, Lancashire to Newry, County Down.

=== Unknown date ===
List of shipwrecks: Unknown date in November 1819
Ship	State	Description
Agno	United Kingdom	The ship was wrecked in the Virgin Islands, Hogland, Russia before 26 November. Her crew were rescued. She was on a voyage from London to Saint Petersburg, Russia.
Ann & Sarah	United Kingdom	The ship was abandoned in the Atlantic Ocean.
Bayard	United Kingdom	The ship was wrecked and abandoned off Køge, Denmark before 16 November. She was on a voyage from Liverpool, Lancashire to Riga, Russia.
Briton	United Kingdom	The ship ran aground on the Nidings Rocks, off Gothenburg, Sweden before 9 November. She was refloated with the assistance of divers.
Brothers	United Kingdom	The ship sank off Great Yarmouth, Norfolk. Her crew were rescued.
Diana	Russia	The ship ran aground on the Sommers. She was on a voyage from Liverpool, Lancashire, United Kingdom to Wyborg. She was refloated and put in to Reval.
Eliza	United Kingdom	The ship was driven ashore on Abruka, Russia. She was on a voyage from Riga, Russia to Belfast, County Antrim.
Florianus	Spain	The ship foundered 30 leagues (90 nautical miles (170 km)) off Bilbao. Her crew were rescued. She was on a voyage from Bilbao to London, United Kingdom.
Hector	United Kingdom	The ship was wrecked on the Haisborough Sands, in the North Sea off the coast of Norfolk. Her crew were rescued
Hibernia	United Kingdom	The ship was departed from Miramichi Bay for Maryport, Cumberland in mid-November. No further trace, presumed foundered with the loss of all hands.
Jeune Robert	France	The brig was driven ashore and wrecked on Sapelo Island, Georgia, United States in early November.
John Crowther	United Kingdom	The ship was driven ashore and severely damaged at Tongue Point, Lower Canada, British North America in early November. She was on a voyage from Montreal, Lower Canada to Liverpool.
John Watson	United Kingdom	The ship sprang a leak and was beached at Cape San Antonio, Cuba. She was on a voyage from New Orleans, Louisiana to Liverpool. John Watson was later refloated and taken in to Havana, Cuba.
Lively	United Kingdom	The ship foundered in the North Sea.
Marmaduke	United Kingdom	The schooner was abandoned off Pouch Cove, Newfoundland in late November.
Mary and Ann	United Kingdom	The ship was driven ashore at Mundesley, Norfolk. She was on a voyage from Louth, Lincolnshire to London.
Mercurius	United Kingdom	The ship was lost near Gravelines, Pas-de-Calais, France. She was on a voyage from Danzig to Jersey, Channel Islands.
Merioneth	United Kingdom	The ship was lost in Bridgwater Bay. Her crew were rescued.
Pheasant	United Kingdom	The ship was wrecked in Portland West Bay, Dorset. She was on a voyage from Poole, Dorset to Milford Haven, Pembrokeshire.
Sally	United Kingdom	The sloop foundered in the Atlantic Ocean off the Isles of Scilly in early November.
Star	United Kingdom	The ship was driven ashore on Wrangel Island in early November. She was on a voyage from Saint Petersburg to London. She was refloated and resumed her voyage.
Traveller	United Kingdom	The ship was driven ashore at "Rutland". She was on a voyage from Liverpool to Killala, County Mayo.
Two Friends	United Kingdom	The ship foundered off Padstow, Cornwall with the loss of all hands. She was on a voyage from Falmouth, Cornwall to a Welsh port.
Victor	United Kingdom	The ship was lost between Arendal and Østerrisør, Norway. Her crew were rescued. She was on a voyage from Danzig to Liverpool.
William	United Kingdom	The ship ran aground in Lake St. Peter's, Lower Canada in early November.
Willing Maid	United Kingdom	The ship was abandoned in the Irish Sea off Point Lynas, Anglesey. She was on a voyage from Liverpool to Bristol, Gloucestershire.
Zealous	United Kingdom	The ship ran aground on the Reval Stone. She was on a voyage from Saint Petersburg to London. She was refloated and resumed her voyage.

== December ==
=== 1 December ===
List of shipwrecks: 1 December 1819
Ship	State	Description
Diana	United Kingdom	The ship was driven ashore in the Solway Firth. She was on a voyage from British North America to Dumfries.
Isabella	United Kingdom	The ship was abandoned in the Atlantic Ocean. Her crew were rescued by Belmont (United Kingdom). Isabella was on a voyage from New Brunswick, British North America to London.
Maria	United Kingdom	The nbrig was abandoned off the Isles of Scilly. Her crew were rescued by Providence. Maria was on a voyage from Newfoudland, British North America to Dublin.
Propriety	United Kingdom	The ship departed from Liverpool, Lancashire for Arendal, Norway. She subsequently foundered.

=== 2 December ===
List of shipwrecks: 2 December 1819
Ship	State	Description
Margaret	United Kingdom	The ship was abandoned whilst on a voyage from Veracruz, Viceroyalty of New Granada to Gibraltar. Her crew survived.
Seaflower	United Kingdom	The ship was wrecked on the Shipwash Sand, in the North Sea off Harwich, Essex. Her crew were rescued.
Sophia	United Kingdom	The ship was abandoned in the Atlantic Ocean. Her crew were rescued by Minerva (United Kingdom). Sophia was on a voyage from Chaleur Bay to Bristol, Gloucestershire.

=== 3 December ===
List of shipwrecks: 3 December 1819
Ship	State	Description
Emma	United Kingdom	The ship was abandoned in the Atlantic Ocean (49°46′N 22°12′W) with the loss of three lives. Survivors were rescued by Mercator (United Kingdom). Emma was on a voyage from Miramichi, New Brunswick, British North America to Liverpool, Lancashire.
Heroine	United States	The ship was driven ashore and wrecked at Bermuda. She was on a voyage from Virginia to Bermuda.
Lingars	United Kingdom	The ship ran agroud on the Sizewell Bank, in the North Sea off the coast of Suffolk and sank.

=== 4 December ===
List of shipwrecks: 4 December 1819
Ship	State	Description
Apollo	United Kingdom	The ship was driven ashore at Great Yarmouth, Norfolk. She was on a voyage from Newcastle upon Tyne, Northumberland to Sheerness, Kent.
Caldicot Castle	United Kingdom	The ship ran aground and was severely damaged at Sunderland, County Durham.
Hope	United Kingdom	The ship was wrecked on the coast of Tiree. Her crew were rescued. She was on a voyage from Belfast, County Antrim to Sligo.
HMRC Vigilant	Board of Customs	The cutter was driven ashore and wrecked at Torbay, Devon. Her crew were rescued.

=== 5 December ===
List of shipwrecks: 5 December 1819
Ship	State	Description
Aline	United Kingdom	The ship was driven ashore at Calais, France. She was on a voyage from London to Rouen, Seine-Inférieure, France. Aline was refloated on 22 December and taken in to Calais.
HMRC Cameleon	Board of Customs	The cutter was driven ashore at Rye, Sussex.
Cossack	Russia	The ship was driven ashore near Dragør, Denmark. She was on a voyage from Saint Petersburg to London.
Henry	United States	The sloop was lost at Ocracoke, North Carolina.
Oceana	Portugal	The ship was driven ashore at Oporto, where she was wrecked on 9 December. She was on a voyage from Pernambuco, Brazil to Oporto.
Union	United Kingdom	The full-rigged ship ran aground in the River Tees and was wrecked.

=== 6 December ===
List of shipwrecks: 6 December 1819
Ship	State	Description
Agenoria	United Kingdom	The ship was wrecked in the Atlantic Ocean with the loss of three lives. Six survivors were rescued by Alexander (United Kingdom). Agenoria was on a voyage from Quebec, British North America to Bridgwater, Somerset.
Aid	United Kingdom	The ship ran aground on the Horse Sand, in the Solent. She was on a voyage from Sunderland, County Durham to Portsmouth, Hampshire. She was refloated and taken in to Portsmouth.
Bonne Confiance	Kingdom of Hanover	The ship was wrecked near Cette, Hérault, France.
Melanie	United Kingdom	The ship was abandoned in the English Channel. She was on a voyage from the River Boyne to Rouen, Seine-Inférieure, France. Melanie was later taken in to Rye, Sussex.
Minerva	Sweden	The ship was driven ashore and wrecked near "Carcassonne". Her crew were rescued. She was on a voyage from Stockholm to Marseille, Bouches-du-Rhône, France.
Oden	Sweden	The ship was wrecked near Cette, Hérault, France.
Princess Augusta	United Kingdom	The ship was wrecked on the White Bank. She was on a voyage from Dublin to London.
True Briton	United Kingdom	The brig departed from Swansea, Glamorgan for Hayle, Cornwall. No further trace, presumed foundered with the loss of all hands.
Ulysses	Sweden	The ship was wrecked near Cette.

=== 7 December ===
List of shipwrecks: 7 December 1819
Ship	State	Description
Breadalbane	United Kingdom	The brig was abandoned in the Atlantic Ocean (50°17′N 23°36′W) with the loss of eight lives. Five survivors were rescued by the brig Garland (United Kingdom). Breadalbane was on a voyage from Miramichi, New Brunswick, British North America to Lancaster, Lancashire.
Brothers	United Kingdom	The smack was wrecked near Selsey, Sussex. Her crew survived.
Friends Increase	United Kingdom	The brig ran aground at Sunderland, County Durham.
Goudies	United Kingdom	The ship ran aground off St. Simons, Georgia, United States. Her crew were rescued. She was on a voyage from Greenock, Renfrewshire to Savannah, Georgia.
Juno	Prussia	The ship was driven ashore and wrecked at Pakefield, Suffolk, United Kingdom. Her crew were rescued. She was on a voyage from Memel to Lisbon, Portugal.
Louise Mathilde	Netherlands	The ship departed from Japan for Batavia, Netherlands East Indies. No further trace, presumed foundered with the loss of all hands.
Œconomy	United Kingdom	The ship struck the Sparrow Hawk Rocks, in the North Sea off South Shields, County Durham and was severely damaged. Her crew were rescued by the South Shields Lifeboat. She was on a voyage from Miramichi Bay to South Shields. Œconomy was refloated on 14 December and taken in to South Shields.
Phœnix	Denmark	The ship was driven ashore and wrecked at Great Yarmouth, Norfolk, United Kingdom with the loss of all hands. She was on a voyage from Copenhagen to Saint Croix, Virgin Islands.
Prince of Wales	United Kingdom	The ship was wrecked on the North Bull, in the Irish Sea off County Dublin with the loss of all hands.
Two Brothers	United Kingdom	The sloop was abandoned in the English Channel off the Owers Sandbank. She was later taken in to Portsmouth, Hampshire.
Washington	United States	The ship was driven ashore at Great Yarmouth and was abandoned by her crew. She was on a voyage from Bremen to St. Ubes, Portugal.

=== 8 December ===
List of shipwrecks: 8 December 1819
Ship	State	Description
Ann	United Kingdom	The ship foundered in the Atlantic Ocean off Santa Clara, Azores, Portugal. She was on a voyage from Bristol, Gloucestershire to São Miguel, Azores.
Ceres	United Kingdom	The sloop was driven ashore at Sunderland, County Durham. She was on a voyage from Rotterdam, South Holland, Netherlands to Stockton-on-Tees, Yorkshire. Ceres was refloated on 10 December and taken in to Sunderland.
Dorcas Savage	United Kingdom	The ship was driven ashore at Belfast, County Antrim.
Lingars	United Kingdom	The ship struck a sandbank and foundered in the North Sea off Sizewell, Suffolk.

=== 9 December ===
List of shipwrecks: 9 December 1819
Ship	State	Description
Eugene	France	The ship was driven ashore and wrecked on Tybee Island, Georgia, United States. She was on a voyage from Havre de Grâce, Seine-Inférieure to Savannah, Georgia.

=== 10 December ===
List of shipwrecks: 10 December 1819
Ship	State	Description
Courland	(United Kingdom of Great Britain and Ireland) Tobago	The sloop was driven ashore and wrecked in Arnoe's Vale Bay.
Earl of St. Vincent	United Kingdom	The ship was driven ashore by ice at Hellevoetsluis, Zeeland, Netherlands.

=== 12 December ===
List of shipwrecks: 12 December 1819
Ship	State	Description
Belgrave	United Kingdom	The ship was driven ashore at Mockbeggar, Cheshire. She was on a voyage from Saint Petersburg, Russia to Liverpool, Lancashire. Belgrave was refloated on 15 December and taken in to Liverpool.
George Symes	United Kingdom	The ship was driven ashore at Mockbeggar. She was on a voyage from Quebec City, Lower Canada, British North America to Liverpool. George Symes was refloated on 15 December and taken in to Liverpool.
Golden Fleece	United Kingdom	The ship was driven ashore at Mockbeggar. She was on a voyage from Bahia, Brazil to Liverpool. Golden Fleece was refloated on 15 December and taken in to Liverpool.

=== 13 December ===
List of shipwrecks: 13 December 1819
Ship	State	Description
Hope	United Kingdom	The ship ran aground on the Home Sand, in the North Sea off Great Yarmouth, Norfolk. She was refloated on 16 December.
Maria	United Kingdom	The brig was abandoned in the Atlantic Ocean 200 leagues (600 nautical miles (1,100 km)) south west of the Isles of Scilly. Her crew were rescued by Providence (United Kingdom). Maria was on a voyage from St. John's, Newfoundland, British North America to London.
Peterhead Packet	United Kingdom	The schooner collided with Sampson (United Kingdom) in The Downs and sank. Her crew were rescued.
Rapid	United Kingdom	The ship was lost whilst on a voyage from Odessa, Russia to Marseille, Bouches-du-Rhône, France. Her crew were rescued by the brig St. Nicolo (Russia).

=== 14 December ===
List of shipwrecks: 14 December 1819
Ship	State	Description
Acorn	United Kingdom	The ship was driven ashore at Aldeburgh, Suffolk. She was on a voyage from London to Blyth, Northumberland.
British Queen	United Kingdom	The ship was driven ashore at Great Yarmouth, Norfolk. She was on a voyage from Newcastle upon Tyne, Northumberland to Great Yarmouth. She was refloated.
Gilbert Henderson	United Kingdom	The ship ran aground on a sunken rock at Holyhead, Anglesey and was severely damaged. She was on a voyage from Miramichi, New Brunswick, British North America to Liverpool, Lancashire.

=== 15 December ===
List of shipwrecks: 15 December 1819
Ship	State	Description
Coaster	United Kingdom	The ship was driven ashore at Boulogne, Pas-de-Calais, France. She was refloated on 16 January 1820 and taken in to Boulogne for repairs.
Dolphin	United Kingdom	The ship was driven ashore in Bootle Bay. She was on a voyage from Bordeaux, Gironde, France to Liverpool, Lancashire.
Hope	United Kingdom	The ship was wrecked on the Goodwin Sands, Kent. Her crew were rescued. She was on a voyage from Sunderland, County Durham to Weymouth, Dorset.
Jane	United Kingdom	The ship was driven ashore in Bootle Bay. She was on a voyage from Dublin to Liverpool.
Lagan	United Kingdom	The ship was driven ashore in Bootle Bay. She was on a voyage from Belfast, County Antrim to Liverpool.
Providence	United Kingdom	The ship was driven ashore in Bootle Bay. She was on a voyage from Cork to Liverpool.
Rosebud	United Kingdom	The ship capsized and sank in the North Sea off Blakeney, Norfolk. Her crew were rescued by Dolphin (United Kingdom). Rosebud was on a voyage from London to Hull, Yorkshire.

=== 16 December ===
List of shipwrecks: 16 December 1819
Ship	State	Description
Demerara	United Kingdom	The ship was wrecked on Lesser Keroe Island, County Wexford with the loss of all hands, at least 22 lives. She was on a voyage from Demerara to Liverpool, Lancashire.
Flora	United Kingdom	The brig was wrecked at Milford Haven, Pembrokeshire with the loss of eight of her nine crew. She was on a voyage from Burry Port, Glamorgan to Dublin.
Fortitude	United Kingdom	The ship was driven ashore in Firestone Bay. She was on a voyage from Chepstow, Monmouthshire to Plymouth, Devon.
Goodintent	United Kingdom	The smack foundered in the English Channel off Start Point, Devon.
Hope	United Kingdom	The smack was wrecked on the Peverall Ledge with the loss of all hands. She was on a voyage from Bangor to King's Lynn, Norfolk.
Mary	United Kingdom	The ship was wrecked at São Miguel, Azores, Portugal with the loss of a crew member.

=== 17 December ===
List of shipwrecks: 17 December 1819
Ship	State	Description
Acorn	United Kingdom	The brig was driven ashore at Dungeness, Kent with the loss of her captain. She was on a voyage from London to Malta. Acorn was refloated on 6 January 1820 and taken in to Dover, Kent.
Agenoria	United Kingdom	The ship was driven ashore at Great Yarmouth, Norfolk. She was on a voyage from London to Whitby, Yorkshire. Agenoria was later refloated.
Autumn	United Kingdom	The ship ran aground and sank off Macduff, Aberdeenshire. Her crew were rescued. She was on a voyage from the River Spey to Gardenstown, Aberdeenshire.
Concord	United Kingdom	The polacca was wrecked on Terceira Island, Azores, Portugal. Her crew survived.
Dolphin	United Kingdom	The ship was driven ashore at Great Yarmouth. She was on a voyage from Dunbar, Lothian to Weymouth, Dorset.
Earl of Dalhousie	United Kingdom	The ship was driven ashore and wrecked on Tresness Point, Sanday, Orkney Islands. She was on a voyage from Miramichi, New Brunswick, British North America to Aberdeen.
Elise	France	The schooner was driven ashore and wrecked on the south coast of the Isle of Wight, United Kingdom. Her crew were rescued. She was on a voyage from Morlaix, Finistère to Dunkerque, Nord.
Eliza and Mary	United Kingdom	The ship was wrecked at Ramsgate, Kent with the loss of a crew member. She was on a voyage from South Shields, County Durham to Arundel, Sussex.
Flora	United Kingdom	The brig was wrecked on Great Castle Head, Pembrokeshire with the loss of eight of her nine crew. She was on a voyage from Burry Port, Glamorgan to Dublin.
Friend's Goodwill	United Kingdom	The full-rigged ship was driven ashore and wrecked at Great Yarmouth. Her crew were rescued. She was on a voyage from Great Yarmouth to Rye, Sussex.
General Elliott	United Kingdom	The ship ran aground on the Gunfleet Sand, in the North Sea off Harwich, Essex and was abandoned by her crew. She was on a voyage from Riga, Russia to London. She was refloated on 20 December with the assistance of eight or nine smacks and taken in to Harwich.
Good Intent	United Kingdom	The smack foundered in the English Channel off Start Point, Devon.
Hope	United Kingdom	The ship was wrecked on the Goodwin Sands, Kent. Her crew were rescued. She was on a voyage from Sunderland, County Durham to Weymouth.
Hope	United Kingdom	The smack was wrecked on the Peverill Ledge, off Swanage, Dorset with the loss of all hands. She was on a voyage from Bangor to King's Lynn, Norfolk.
James and Henry	United Kingdom	The ship was driven ashore in Tramore Bay. Her crew were rescued. She was on a voyage from Maranhão, Brazil to Liverpool.
Jean	United Kingdom	The ship was wrecked at Peterhead, Aberdeenshire. Her crew were rescued. She was on a voyage from Sheerness, Kent to Peterhead.
John and William	United Kingdom	The ship was driven ashore and wrecked at Worthing, Sussex. Her crew were rescued. She was on a voyage from Fowey, Cornwall to Arundel, Sussex.
Lord Normanby	United Kingdom	The ship was lost near Lowestoft, Suffolk with the loss of all ten crew.
Medina	United Kingdom	The ship was driven ashore in Tramore Bay.
Mentor	United Kingdom	The full-rigged ship was wrecked on the Spanish Battery, South Shields. Her crew were rescued.
Mentor	Sweden	The ship was sighted in the Skaggerak whilst on a voyage from Karlshamn to Newry, County Down, United Kingdom. No further trace, presumed foundered with the loss of all hands.
Moina	United Kingdom	The ship was driven ashore and wrecked at Deerness, Orkney Islands. Her crew were rescued.
Peace	United Kingdom	The ship ran aground on the Goodwin Sands. Her crew were rescued. She was on a voyage from London to Antigua. Peace was later refloated and taken in to Margate, Kent in a severely damaged state.
Petit Auguste	France	The ketch was driven ashore and wrecked on Terceira Island, Azores.
Providence	United Kingdom	The ship was driven onto the Spanish Battery, South Shields. Her crew were rescued. She was later refloated and taken in to Leith, Lothian with some damage.
Ruby	United Kingdom	The full-rigged ship was wrecked on the Spanish Battery, South Shields. Her crew were rescued.
Santa Christa	Portugal	The schooner was driven ashore and wrecked on Terceira Island. Her crew survived.
St. George	United Kingdom	The sloop was driven ashore and wrecked 5 nautical miles (9.3 km) north of Peterhead. Her crew were rescued.
Vigilant	United Kingdom	The brig was wrecked on the Goodwin Sands. Her seven crew were rescued. She was on a voyage from Newcastle upon Tyne, Northumberland to Portsmouth, Hampshire
Wharton	United Kingdom	The ship was driven ashore at Sunderland.

=== 18 December ===
List of shipwrecks: 18 December 1819
Ship	State	Description
Ann	United Kingdom	The ship ran aground on the Cross Sand, in the North Sea off the coast of Norfolk. She was on a voyage from Hull, Yorkshire to London. She was refloated and taken in to Great Yarmouth, Norfolk.
Bristol	United Kingdom	The brig was driven ashore and wrecked in Cardigan Bay with the loss of all but one of her crew. She was on a voyage from Cardiff, Glamorgan to Liverpool, Lancashire.
Carl	Flag unknown	The ship was driven ashore at Dungeness, Kent, United Kingdom. She was on a voyage from Lisbon, Portugal to a Baltic port.
Earl of Dalhousie	United Kingdom	The brig was driven ashore and wrecked at Tressness, Sanday, Orkney Islands with the loss of a crew member She was on a voyage from Miramichi Bay to Aberdeen.
John	United Kingdom	The brig was driven ashore and wrecked at Flamborough Head, Yorkshire.
Peace	United Kingdom	The ship ran aground on the Goodwin Sands, Kent. Her crew were rescued. She was on a voyage from South Shields, County Durham to Antigua. She floated off, and was taken in to Margate, Kent, where she arrived on 20 December.
Roseberry	United Kingdom	The ship ran aground on the Marsdon Rocks, off North Shields, Northumberland.
Seaflower	United Kingdom	The schooner was abandoned off Terceira Island, Azores, Portugal. She was wrecked on 20 December.
Speedwell	United Kingdom	The schooner was abandoned off Terceira Island. She subsequently came ashore. Speedwell was later refloated and departed for Liverpool.
Summer	United Kingdom	The ship was abandoned in the North Sea. She was on a voyage from Berwick upon Tweed, Northumberland to Newport, Monmouthshire. She was subsequently taken in to Great Yarmouth.
Thomas	United Kingdom	The brig was abandoned off Terceira Island.
Vigilant	United Kingdom	The brig was wrecked on the Goodwin Sands, Kent. Her seven crew were rescued. She was on a voyage from Newcastle upon Tyne, Northumberland to Portsmouth, Hampshire.
Unnamed	Spain	The brig was wrecked at Porthleven, Cornwall, United Kingdom with the loss of six of her crew. She was on a voyage from Bilboa to London, United Kingdom.

=== 19 December ===
List of shipwrecks: 19 December 1819
Ship	State	Description
American	United States	The ship was wrecked at Sandy Hook, New Jersey with the loss of fifteen lives. She was on a voyage from Bengal, India to New York.
Bounty Hall	United Kingdom	The brig was driven ashore near Swansea, Glamorgan. She was on a voyage from Calcutta, India to Liverpool, Lancashire. Bounty was refloated on 30 December and was subsequently repaired.
Bristol	United Kingdom	The ship ran aground in Cardigan Bay with the loss of all but one of her crew. She was on a voyage from Cardiff, Glamorgan to Liverpool.
Dolphin	United Kingdom	The ship was wrecked on the Black Middens, in the North Sea off South Shields, County Durham. Her crew were rescued. She was on a voyage from Dover, Kent to South Shields.
Eliza Ann	United Kingdom	The ship was driven ashore at The Mumbles, Glamorgan. She was on a voyage from Saint John, New Brunswick, British North America to Liverpool. Eliza Ann was later refloated and taken in to Liverpool.
Foremack	United Kingdom	The ship was driven ashore and severely damaged at Flamborough Head, Yorkshire. She was on a voyage from Weymouth, Dorset to Sunderland, County Durham. She was refloated and taken in to Scarborough, Yorkshire.
Glasgow	United Kingdom	The ship was driven ashore at Leith, Lothian. She was on a voyage from Peterhead, Aberdeenshire to Leith.
John	United Kingdom	The ship was driven ashore and wrecked at Flamborough Head.
Medina	United Kingdom	The ship was driven ashore and wrecked near Milford Haven, Pembrokeshire. Her crew were rescued. She was on a voyage from Cádiz, Spain to Bristol, Gloucestershire.
Montreal Packet	United Kingdom	The brig was wrecked in Mount's Bay with the loss of six of her crew. She was on a voyage from Tarragona, Spain to London.
Unnamed	United Kingdom	The ship was driven ashore at Ambleteuse, Pas-de-Calais, France. She was refloated.
Unnamed	Flag unknown	The ship was driven ashore at Merlimont, Pas-de-Calais.
Unnamed	United Kingdom	The sloop was drive ashore and wrecked at "Gillespie". She was on a voyage from the Isle of Man to Workington, Cumberland with the loss of one of her two crew.

=== 20 December ===
List of shipwrecks: 20 December 1819
Ship	State	Description
Eliza Ann	United Kingdom	The ship was driven ashore in Swansea Bay. She was on a voyage from St. Andrew, New Brunswick, British North America to Liverpool, Lancashire.
Lee	United Kingdom	The ship was driven ashore and wrecked near Étaples, Pas-de-Calais, France.
Mauritius	France	The ship was driven ashore and wrecked near Étaples with the loss of two of her crew.
Rachael	United Kingdom	The sloop sank near Howden, Yorkshire. She was on a voyage from London to Leeds, Yorkshire.
Wallace	United States	The ship was driven ashore and wrecked near Étaples with the loss of four lives. She was on a voyage from Batavia, Netherlands East Indies to Hamburg.
William	United Kingdom	The brig was run down and sunk by the brig Harmony (United Kingdom) in the North Sea 6 nautical miles (11 km) off Trusthorpe, Lincolnshire. Her crew were rescued by Harmony.

=== 21 December ===
List of shipwrecks: 21 December 1819
Ship	State	Description
Activité	France	The ship was wrecked on Bermuda. She was on a voyage from Havana, Cuba to Havre de Grâce, Seine-Inférieure.
Bittern	United Kingdom	The ship was driven ashore and damaged at Saint John, New Brunswick, British North America. She was refloated on 13 January 1820.
Lady Ridley	United Kingdom	The ship was driven ashore at Saint John, New Brunswick.
Swallow	United Kingdom	The brig was driven ashore and wrecked at Portishead, Somerset. She was on a voyage from the Cape of Good Hope, Cape Colony to Bristol, Gloucestershire.

=== 22 December ===
List of shipwrecks: 22 December 1819
Ship	State	Description
Ant	United Kingdom	The ship was driven ashore and wrecked at Bouogne, Pas-de-Calais, France. She was on a voyage from Boulogne to Dover, Kent.
Hero	United Kingdom	The ship foundered in the English Channel off Portland, Dorset. Her crew were rescued.

=== 24 December ===
List of shipwrecks: 24 December 1819
Ship	State	Description
Bristol	United Kingdom	The ship was wrecked near Pencilian, Caernarvonshire with the loss of all but one of her six crew. She was on a voyage from Newport, Monmouthshire to Liverpool, Lancashire.
Esperance	France	The ship foundered in the English Channel off Le Tréport, Seine-Inférieure. Her crew were rescued. She was on a voyage from Saint-Valery-sur-Somme, Somme to Havre de Grâce, Seine-Inférieure.
Columbia	United Kingdom	The ship was driven ashore at Belize. She was on a voyage from Liverpool to Mobile, Alabama, United States.
Lord Normanby	United Kingdom	The ship was wrecked at Lowestoft, Suffolk with the loss of all ten crew.
Redburn	United Kingdom	The ship was driven ashore at Lochmaddy, North Uist, Outer Hebrides and was wrecked. Her crew were rescued. She was on a voyage from Saint Petersburg, Russia to Liverpool.

=== 25 December ===
List of shipwrecks: 25 December 1819
Ship	State	Description
George and Henry's Goodwill	United States	The ship was wrecked off Audierne, Finistère, France. Her crew were rescued. She was on a voyage from Boston, Massachusetts, to Havre de Grâce, Seine-Inférieure, France.
Industry	United Kingdom	The sloop sank at Pwllheli, Caernarvonshire. She was on a voyage from Cardiff, Glamorgan to Whitehaven, Cumberland.

=== 26 December ===
List of shipwrecks: 26 December 1819
Ship	State	Description
Kitty	United Kingdom	The ship was driven ashore and wrecked on Skokholm, Pembrokeshire. Her crew were rescued. She was on a voyage from Seville, Spain to Milford Haven, Pembrokeshire and Waterford.
Letitia	United Kingdom	The ship sprang a leak, capsized and was driven ashore near Pedro Bluff, Jamaica. All on board were rescued. She was on a voyage from Kingston, Jamaica to Dublin and Belfast, County Antrim.
Medina	United Kingdom	The schooner was wrecked ar Marloes, Pembrokeshire. Her crew were rescued by rocket apparatus. She was on a voyage from Cádiz, Spain to Bristol, Gloucestershire
Montreal	United Kingdom	The brig was driven ashore and wrecked at Porthleven, Cornwall with the loss of six of her ten crew. She was on a voyage from Tarragona, Spain to London.

=== 27 December ===
List of shipwrecks: 27 December 1819
Ship	State	Description
Aurora	Netherlands	The ship ran aground on the Arrow Bank, in the Solent. She was on a voyage from Barbadoes to Amsterdam, North Holland.
Speculator	(United Kingdom of Great Britain and Ireland) Jersey	The ship was wrecked at Whitby, Yorkshire. Her crew were rescued. She was on a voyage from Newcastle upon Tyne, Northumberland to Jersey.
Unnamed	United Kingdom	The boat foundered off the Foreness Rock, Margate, Kent with the loss of all seven people on board.

=== 28 December ===
List of shipwrecks: 28 December 1819
Ship	State	Description
Blue-eyed Maid	United Kingdom	The ship was driven ashore at North Foreland, Kent. She was on a voyage from Southampton, Hampshire to London.
HNLMS Cossack	Netherlands Navy	The Brig of War was wrecked off Margate, Kent, United Kingdom. Her crew were rescued. She was bound for Surinam.
Enterprize	Prussia	The barque was taken in to Montrose, Forfarshire, United Kingdom in a wrecked condition. She was on a voyage from Liverpool, Lancashire, United Kingdom to Königsberg.
Lady Sherbrooke	United Kingdom	The ship ran aground on the Herd Sand, in the North Sea off South Shields, County Durham. Her crew were rescued by the South Shields Lifeboat. She was on a voyage from Pictou, Nova Scotia, British North America to South Shields. Lady Sherbrooke was refloated on 4 January 1820 and taken in to South Shields.

=== 29 December ===
List of shipwrecks: 29 December 1819
Ship	State	Description
Ant	United Kingdom	The ship was wrecked at Boulogne, Pas-de-Calais, France. All on board were rescued. She was on a voyage from Boulogne to Dover, Kent.
Fortune	Norway	The ship was wrecked on the Devil's Bank. She was on a voyage from Dram to Calais, France.
Perseverance	United Kingdom	The ship sprang a leak and capsized near St. Andrews, New Brunswick, British North America. She was on a voyage from St Andrew's to Jamaica.
Unnamed	United Kingdom	The cutter was wrecked off Hollesley, Suffolk with the loss of all eight crew.

=== 30 December ===
List of shipwrecks: 30 December 1819
Ship	State	Description
Indian Hunter	United States	The ship was driven ashore at Gibraltar. She was later refloated.
Julia	United Kingdom	The ship was wrecked on the Cross Sand, in the North Sea off Great Yarmouth, Norfolk. Her crew were rescued. She was on a voyage from Newcastle-upon-Tyne, Northumberland to Plymouth, Devon.
Maria	United Kingdom	The ship was driven ashore and wrecked near Porthleven, Cornwall. Her crew were rescued. She was on a voyage from Burry Port, Glamorgan to Porthleven.
Ruckers	United Kingdom	The sloop was wrecked on the Isle of Rhande, Grenada.
Two Brothers	United Kingdom	The ship was driven ashore at Gibraltar. She was refloated the next day.

=== 31 December ===
List of shipwrecks: 31 December 1819
Ship	State	Description
Firm	United Kingdom	The ship was driven ashore at "Schotterarden", Kingdom of Hanover. She was refloated but came ashore again at "Brinkman Woff". Firm was on a voyage from Glasgow, Renfrewshire to Bremen.
Mary	United Kingdom	The ship was wrecked near Saint John, New Brunswick, British North America with the loss of all hands. She was on a voyage from Jamaica to St. John.
Perseverance	United Kingdom	The ship was wrecked at Dipper Creek. Her crew were rescued. She was on a voyage from Boston, Massachusetts, United States to Halifax, Nova Scotia, British North America.
Thomas Ritchie	United Kingdom	The ship was wrecked near St. John. She was on a voyage from Saint Vincent to St. John.

=== Unknown date ===
List of shipwrecks: Unknown date in December 1819
Ship	State	Description
Abeona	United Kingdom	The sloop capsized off São Miguel Island, Azores in late December.
Anna	United Kingdom	The ship was abandoned at sea before 9 December.
Betsey	United Kingdom	The ship was wrecked at Solva, Pembrokeshire. Her crew were rescued. She was on a voyage from Liverpool, Lancashire to Pembroke.
Bounty	United Kingdom	The ship was driven ashore at Swansea, Glamorgan. She was on a voyage from Bengal, India to London.
Bryan	United Kingdom	The ship was wrecked at Howth, County Dublin.
Christina Maria'	Norway	The ship foundered on or before 9 December. Her crew survived. She was on a voyage from Edam, North Holland, Netherlands to Sandefjord.
Douglas	United Kingdom	The ship ran aground on the Bawdsey Sand, in the North Sea off the coast of Suffolk. She was refloated with the assistance of three salvage smacks and taken in to Harwich, Essex.
Eliza Ann	United Kingdom	The ship was driven ashore and wrecked at The Mumbles, Glamorgan. She was on a voyage from St. Andrews, New Brunswick, British North America to Liverpool, Lancashire.
Esperance	France	The ship was driven ashore. She was on a voyage from Saint Petersburg, Russia to Rouen, Seine-Inférieure. She was refloated and taken in to Baltic Port, Russia.
Fanny	United Kingdom	The ship was lost on a voyage from Miramichi Bay to Cork, Her crew were rescued.
Formack	United Kingdom	The ship was driven ashore at Flamborough Head, Yorkshire. She was on a voyage from Weymouth, Dorset to Sunderland, County Durham. She was refloated and taken in to Scarborough, Yorkshire in a severely damaged condition.
Frederick	France	The ship foundered in the Bay of Biscay of Belle Île, Morbihan. Her crew were rescued. She was on a voyage from Bordeaux, Gironde to Rouen, Seine-Inférieure.
Friends	United Kingdom	The ship was abandoned in the Atlantic Ocean. Her crew were rescued by Lovely Nelly (United Kingdom). Friends was on a voyage from Miramichi, New Brunswick, British North America to Workington, Cumberland.
Georges	France	The ship was driven ashore and wrecked at Quimper, Finistère. She was on a voyage from Boston, Massachusetts, United States to Havre de Grâce, Seine-Inférieure.
Hedwig Carolina	Sweden	The ship foundered off Cimbrishamn. She was on a voyage from Norrköping to Lisbon, Portugal.
John	United Kingdom	The brig was lost near Aberdaron, Caernarvonshire. Her crew were rescued.
John Crowther	United Kingdom	The ship was driven ashore and wrecked at The Mumbles. She was on a voyage from Montreal, Lower Canada, British North America to Liverpool.
Liberty	United Kingdom	The ship foundered in the Baltic Sea.
Mary Fell	United Kingdom	The ship foundered in Dingle Bay with the loss of all hands. She was on a voyage from Quebec City, Lower Canada to Limerick.
Neptune	France	The brig was lost near Bordeaux, Gironde before 28 December.
Nile	United Kingdom	The ship was driven ashore and wrecked at The Mumbles.
Petite Auguste	France	The ship was wrecked at Terceira Island, Azores. She was on a voyage from Terceira Island to Havre de Grâce.
Phoenix	United Kingdom	The ship was driven ashore near Beachy Head, Sussex. Her crew were rescued.
Raoul	France	The sloop was wrecked at The Mumbles.
Shannon	United Kingdom	The ship was lost on the "Saintes". She was on a voyage from Lisbon, Portugal to London.
Spes Nova	Norway	The ship was driven ashore near Christiania. She was on a voyage from Havre de Grâce, Seine-Inférieure, France to Dram.
Staff of Life	United States	The ship was driven ashore and wrecked at Provincetown, Massachusetts.
Success	United Kingdom	The ship was lost in Dundalk Bay. Her crew were rescued. She was on a voyage from Whitehaven, Cumberland to an Irish port.
Sultan	France	The ship was wrecked near Les Sables-d'Olonne, Vendée after 18 December. Her crew survived. She was on a voyage from Bordeaux, Gironde to "Rodon".
Thomas	United Kingdom	The ship was driven ashore on Terceira Island in early December. She was on a voyage from Terceira Island to London. Thomas was later refloated.
William Bayfield	United Kingdom	The ship foundered in the Baltic Sea.
William Blair	United Kingdom	The ship was driven ashore and wrecked at The Mumbles. She was on a voyage from Montreal to Liverpool.
William Sibbald	United Kingdom	The brig ran aground in the North Sea off Great Yarmouth, Norfolk and was abandoned.

== Unknown date ==
List of shipwrecks: Unknown date in 1819
Ship	State	Description
Arianda (Арианда, 'Ariadne')	Imperial Russian Navy	The corvette was wrecked on the Persian coast of the Caspian Sea.
Argus	United Kingdom	The brig sank at Anegada, Virgin Islands.
Bostock	United Kingdom	The ship was wrecked in the Windward Islands. Her crew survived. She was on a voyage from Havana, Cuba to Kingstown, St Vincent.
Bullberry	United Kingdom	The ship was lost near Fogo, Newfoundland, British North America. Her crew were rescued. She was on a voyage from Lisbon, Portugal to Newfoundland.
Camilla	United Kingdom	The ship was driven ashore and wrecked at Petitcodiac, New Brunswick, British North America.
Constellation	United Kingdom	The ship was lost on the coast of Nova Scotia, British North America. Her passengers were rescued. She was on a voyage from an Irish port to New Brunswick, British North America.
Diamond	United Kingdom	The whaler was lost off Greenland.
Daphne	United Kingdom	The brig was wrecked on the coast of Van Diemen's Land, 200 nautical miles (370 km) from the mouth of the River Derwent sometime between 14 October and 12 December. She was on a voyage from Port Jackson, New South Wales to Bengal, India.
Edward Bolton	United States	The ship was lost near Batavia, Netherlands East Indies before 4 February. Her crew were rescued.
Elizabeth & Mary	United Kingdom	The ship was driven ashore at Maranhão, Brazil. She was later refloated and repaired.
Esperanza de Tejo	Portugal	The ship foundered in the Atlantic Ocean whilst on a voyage from Lisbon to Seara, Brazil.
Fawn	United States	The ship was lost on the coast of Abyssinia. Her crew were rescued. She was on a voyage from Mokha, Qasimid State to Boston, Massachusetts.
Fortune	France	The ship was lost off Sicily. She was on a voyage from Marseille, Bouches-du-Rhône to Cyprus.
Frederick Henry	France	The ship was lost at Senegal.
Four Sisters	United Kingdom	The ship ran aground in the Yangon River before 20 March. She was on a voyage from Madras, India to Rangoon. She was later refloated.
Hannah	United Kingdom	The ship was severely damaged by fire at Richibucto, New Brunswick.
Harriet	United Kingdom	The ship was wrecked on St. Peter's Island. She was on a voyage from Prince Edward Island, British North America to Liverpool.
Hirondelle	France	The ship was lost off Malta. She was on a voyage from Marseille to Cyprus.
Hudsar	United Kingdom	The ship was wrecked on the coast of Alta California, Viceroyalty of New Spain. Her crew were rescued.
James Edwards	United States	The schooner sank at Anegada.
John & Mary	United Kingdom	The ship was driven ashore in the Saint Lawrence River. She was on a voyage from Montreal, Lower Canada, British North America to Liverpool, Lancashire.
Julian	United Kingdom	The ship was wrecked at Orange Bay, Jamaica. Her crew were rescued. She was on a voyage from Jamaica to Bermuda.
Kingston	United Kingdom	The ship was abandoned in the Gulf of Florida. She was on a voyage from British Honduras to London.
Loreto	Portugal	The ship was lost in the Corto Velo River, Brazil. She was on a voyage from Oporto to Rio de Janeiro, Brazil.
Lydia	France	The ship was lost off Bermuda. All on board were rescued. She was on a voyage from Bordeaux, Gironde to New York, United States.
Mariposa	Spain	The ship was wrecked on Bird Island. Her crew were rescued. She was on a voyage from "La Guyra" to A Coruña.
Maxwell	United States	The schooner sank at Anegada.
Myrtle	United Kingdom	The smack was lost in the Bay of Exploits, Newfoundland.
Prescott	United Kingdom	The whaler was lost whilst bound for the Davis Strait.
Raitt	United Kingdom	The whaler was lost in the Davis Strait.
Rover	United Kingdom	The ship was lost whilst on a voyage from Jamaica to Halifax, Nova Scotia. Her crew survived.
Sally	United Kingdom	The ship was lost at Port-au-Prince, Haiti. She was on a voyage from Amsterdam, North Holland, Netherlands to Havana.
Sandwich	United Kingdom	The ship was wrecked on the Florida Reef. She was on a voyage from Havana to Guernsey, Channel Islands.
Speedy	United Kingdom	The ship was lost on the coast of Africa.
St. Joze Fama	Portugal	The ship foundered whilst on a voyage from Mozambique to Madras, India. Her crew were rescued by a Portuguese Navy ship.
Swiftsure	United Kingdom	The ship was lost in the River Plate.
Veloz	Spain	The ship was captured and burnt by a felucca She was on a voyage from Batabanó, Cuba to Kingston, Jamaica.
Volvent	Denmark	The ship sank at Anegada.
