= List of shipwrecks in May 1825 =

The list of shipwrecks in May 1825 includes some ships sunk, wrecked or otherwise lost during May 1825.

== 1 May ==
List of shipwrecks: 1 May 1825
Ship	State	Description
Albemarle	United States	The steamboat was destroyed by fire in the Delaware River.
Clio	United Kingdom	The ship was wrecked on the Sandhammer Reef, in the Baltic Sea. She was on a voyage from Memel, Prussia to Great Yarmouth, Norfolk.
Thetis	Sweden	The galiot was wrecked near Quillebeuf-sur-Seine, Eure, France. Her crew were rescued.

== 3 May ==
List of shipwrecks: 3 May 1825
Ship	State	Description
Vierge Marie	Netherlands	The ship ran aground off Walcheren, Zeeland. She was on a voyage from Messina, Sicily to Dordrecht, South Holland.

== 4 May ==
List of shipwrecks: 4 May 1825
Ship	State	Description
Rebecca	United States	The ship was lost off Rum Key. She was on a voyage from Jamaica to New York.

== 5 May ==
List of shipwrecks: 5 May 1825
Ship	State	Description
Eliza Ann	United Kingdom	The brig sprang a leak in the Atlantic Ocean and was abandoned by her crew, who were rescued by Mercator (United Kingdom). Eliza Ann was on a voyage from Liverpool, Lancashire to Wiscasset, Maine, United States.

== 6 May ==
List of shipwrecks: 6 May 1825
Ship	State	Description
Henrietta	United Kingdom	The ship was wrecked on a reef off Neuwark and was wrecked. She was on a voyage from Anclam, Prussia to Liverpool, Lancashire.
Place	United Kingdom	The ship foundered off Polperro, Cornwall while on a voyage from Fowey, Cornwall to Swansea, Glamorgan. Her crew survived.
Test's Hill	United Kingdom	The ship capsized in a squall off Plymouth, Devon. Her crew were rescued.

== 7 May ==
List of shipwrecks: 7 May 1825
Ship	State	Description
William	United Kingdom	The ship was lost in ice in Pleasant Bay, Nova Scotia. All on board were rescued by Cumberland (United Kingdom). She was on a voyage from Whitehaven to Richibucto, New Brunswick, British North America.

== 8 May ==
List of shipwrecks: 8 May 1825
Ship	State	Description
Albert	United Kingdom	The ship was abandoned in the Atlantic Ocean. Cambridge (United Kingdom) rescued the crew. Albert was on a voyage from Virginia, United States to London.
Ocean	United Kingdom	The ship was wrecked on Morrison's Reef, of the coast of Jamaica.

== 9 May ==
List of shipwrecks: 9 May 1825
Ship	State	Description
Oglethorpe	United Kingdom	The ship was driven ashore on Tybee Island, Georgia, United States. She was on a voyage from Savannah, Georgia to Liverpool, Lancashire. Oglethorpe was refloated on 11 May and resumed her voyage.

== 11 May ==
List of shipwrecks: 11 May 1825
Ship	State	Description
Ann	United Kingdom	The ship was holed by ice off Hogland, Russia and was beached at "Hundswick". All on board were rescued. She was on a voyage from Kronstadt, Russia to London. Ann was later refloated and taken in to Reval, Russia, where she was declared beyond repair.
Dick	United Kingdom	The ship was wrecked 30 nautical miles (56 km) from the mouth of the Rio Grande with some loss of life. She was on a voyage from Marseille, Bouches-du-Rhône, France to the Pacific Ocean.
Sally	United Kingdom	The ship was wrecked on "Feroy" with the loss of three of her four crew. She was on a voyage from Killala, County Louth to Liverpool, Lancashire.
Sons of Commerce	United Kingdom	The ship was wrecked on the Folley Reef, off Aux Cayes, Haiti. She was on a voyage from Jacmel, Haiti to London.
Whim	(United Kingdom of Great Britain and Ireland) Saint Vincent	The drogging sloop capsized in a squall and sank with the loss of more than eight lives.

== 12 May ==
List of shipwrecks: 12 May 1825
Ship	State	Description
Molly	United Kingdom	The ship was wrecked off Ballywalter, County Antrim. She was on a voyage from Kilrush, County Clare to Liverpool, Lancashire.
Vrow Christina	Hamburg	The ship was wrecked on Norderney, Kingdom of Hanover. Her crew were rescued. She was on a voyage from Hamburg to Hull, Yorkshire, United Kingdom.

== 14 May ==
List of shipwrecks: 14 May 1825
Ship	State	Description
Anna	United Kingdom	The ship ran aground off the north coast of Bermuda. She was on voyage from Bermuda to Demerara and London. She was refloated on 21 May.
Primeiro de Cataluna	Spain	The ship was sunk off the entrance to the Strait of Gibraltar in an engagement with Vincedor ( Gran Colombian Navy) with the loss of three lives. The 80 surviving passengers and crew were rescued by Vincedor. Primeiro de Cataluna was on a voyage from Havana, Cuba to Barcelona.

== 15 May ==
List of shipwrecks: 15 May 1825
Ship	State	Description
Friends	United Kingdom	The ship was wrecked on the Isle of Niquette. She was on a voyage from Dublin to Quebec City, Lower Canada, British North America.

== 17 May ==
List of shipwrecks: 17 May 1825
Ship	State	Description
Centurion	United Kingdom	The ship sprang a leak and was beached on Goose Island, Nova Scotia. She was on a voyage from Quebec City, Lower Canada, British North America to Bristol, Gloucestershire. She was refloated the same day. She returned to Quebec City on 18 May, then went to Munn's Cove to unload her cargo and undergo repairs.
Columbus	United Kingdom	The four-masted full-rigged ship sprang a leak and foundered in the Atlantic Ocean. Her 72 crew were rescued by Dolphin ( (United Kingdom of Great Britain and Ireland) British North America). She was on a voyage from London to the St. Lawrence River.

== 18 May ==
List of shipwrecks: 18 May 1825
Ship	State	Description
Friends	United Kingdom	The ship was wrecked on Bequette Island, Lower Canada, British North America. She was on a voyage from Dublin to Quebec City, Lower Canada.

== 19 May ==
List of shipwrecks: 19 May 1825
Ship	State	Description
Mary	United Kingdom	The sloop sprang a leak and foundered in the English Channel off The Needles, Isle of Wight. Her crew were rescued. She was on a voyage from Swanage, Dorset to Cowes, Isle of Wight.
Simon Taylor	(United Kingdom of Great Britain and Ireland) Jamaica	The sloop was wrecked in Bull Bay. Her crew were rescued. She was on a voyage from Kingston to Marichoneal Bay.

== 20 May ==
List of shipwrecks: 20 May 1825
Ship	State	Description
John	United Kingdom	The ship was wrecked on the Viceosa Reef, in the Black River. Her crew survived. She was on a voyage from London to "Poyais".

== 21 May ==
List of shipwrecks: 21 May 1825
Ship	State	Description
Aurora	France	The ship was driven ashore near La Bouille, Seine-Inférieure. She was on a voyage from Cette, Hérault to Rouen, Seine-Inférieure.

== 22 May ==
List of shipwrecks: 22 May 1825
Ship	State	Description
Henry Schultz	United States	The steamboat was destroyed by fire at Augusta, Georgia.

== 23 May ==
List of shipwrecks: 23 May 1825
Ship	State	Description
Semper	Spain	The brig ran aground off Bermuda. She was on a voyage from Havana, Cuba to Tenerife, Canary Islands. Semper was refloated and put into St. George's, Bermuda for repairs.

== 25 May ==
List of shipwrecks: 25 May 1825
Ship	State	Description
Cornelia Henrica	Netherlands	The ship ran aground in the Noordhollandsch Kanaal at Purmerend and was damaged. She was on a voyage from Amsterdam, North Holland to Batavia Netherlands East Indies.
Ringdove	(United Kingdom of Great Britain and Ireland) Saint Lucia	The drogher was lost in the Dorée River.
Success	United Kingdom	The ship sprang a leak in the Atlantic Ocean and was abandoned. Her crew were rescued by George (United Kingdom). She was on a voyage from North Shields, County Durham to Saint John, New Brunswick, British North America.
Thomas	United Kingdom	The ship foundered in the North Sea off the coast of County Durham.

== 27 May ==
List of shipwrecks: 27 May 1825
Ship	State	Description
Alert	Netherlands East Indies	The ship was abandoned in the Atlantic Ocean. Her crew were rescued by Temerario (flag unknown). Active was on a voyage from Batavia to Rotterdam, South Holland, Netherlands.
Brutus	United Kingdom	The ship was wrecked on the Florida Reef. Her crew were rescued. She was on a voyage from Havana, Cuba to London.

== 28 May ==
List of shipwrecks: 28 May 1825
Ship	State	Description
Heureux	France	The ship was wrecked on Long Key, off Crooked Island, Bahamas. Her crew were rescued. She was on a voyage from St. Jago de Cuba, Cuba to Bordeaux, Gironde.
Vrow Sophia	Netherlands	The ship was driven ashore near Halmstadt, Sweden. She was on a voyage from Memel, Prussia to Amsterdam, North Holland.

== 31 May ==
List of shipwrecks: 31 May 1825
Ship	State	Description
Eliza	United Kingdom	The ship departed from Limerick for Glasgow, Renfrewshire. No further trace, presumed foundered in the Irish Sea with the loss of all hands.
Juno	United States	The ship sprang a leak in the Atlantic Ocean and was abandoned. All on board were rescued by Olive (United Kingdom) before she was set afire. Juno was on a voyage from Liverpool, Lancashire, United Kingdom to Boston, Massachusetts.

== Unknown date ==
List of shipwrecks: Unknown date in May 1825
Ship	State	Description
Catherine	United Kingdom	The ship foundered in the Atlantic Ocean. Her crew were rescued by Three Sisters (United Kingdom).
Catharina Sophia	Prussia	The ship was wrecked on Bornholm, Denmark.
Hermit	United Kingdom	The ship was abandoned off Bird Island, British North America before 16 May.
Hibernia	United Kingdom	The ship was driven ashore in the Hooghly River. She was on a voyage from Bengal, India to Rangoon.
Lydia & Mary	United States	The ship was capsized and sunk by a waterspout. Her crew survived. She was on a voyage from Faial Island, Azores to Tampico, Mexico.
Mary Ann	United States	The ship foundered in the Atlantic Ocean on or before 23 May.
Pallas	(United Kingdom of Great Britain and Ireland) Gibraltar	The ship was driven ashore at the mouth of the Mississippi River on or before 24 May.
Prince of Saxe Coburg	United Kingdom	The ship ran aground on the Hogsty Reef and was damaged. She was on a voyage from Jacmel, Haiti to Plymouth, Devon. Prince of Saxe Coburg was refloated and put into Norfolk, Virginia, United States.
Sons of Commerce	United Kingdom	The ship was wrecked on Folly Reef, off Aux Cayes, Haiti before 21 May. She was on a voyage from Jacmel, Haiti to London.
St. Lawrence	(United Kingdom of Great Britain and Ireland) British North America	The ship ran aground in the St. Lawrence River. She was on a voyage from Quebec City, Lower Canada to London.
Trevor	United Kingdom	The ship was driven ashore near Wells-next-the-Sea, Norfolk.
Vittoria	United Kingdom	The ship was driven ashore in the Hooghly River. She was on a voyage from Calcutta to Rangoon.
Vrow Gesina	Netherlands	The ship was lost near "Pero". She was on a voyage from Danzig to Amsterdam, North Holland.
