= Barrier Boat =

United States Navy boat

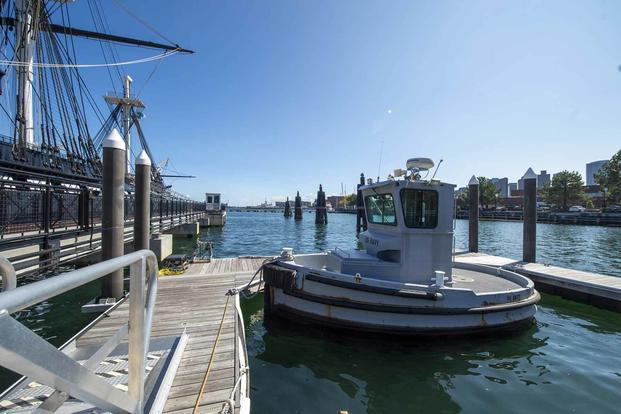
- 19BB "Boomin Beaver" next to the USS Constitution

Class overview
- Name: 19BB (Barrier Boat)
- Builders: Chuck's Boat and Drive
- Operators: United States Navy
- In service: 2003–present
- Planned: 13
- Active: 10

General characteristics
- Class & type: Tugboat
- Displacement: 22,000 lb (10,000 kg)
- Length: 19 ft (5.8 m)
- Beam: 10 ft (3.0 m)
- Draught: 5.5 ft (1.7 m)
- Propulsion: Cummins 6BTA 5.9 L (360 in^{3})
- Complement: 3

The 19BB (Barrier Boat) is a type of small tugboat used by the United States Navy. They were built by Chuck's Boat and Drive of Longview, Washington, in 2002 to deploy and maintain port security booms surrounding Navy ships and installations in port. The first boat of the 13-boat order was delivered in January 2003.

Originally designed to raft and pull floating logs for the commercial logging industry, the Barrier Boats are affectionately known as the Boomin Beaver by the sailors who operate them.

Chuck's Boats founder Chuck Slape had decades of experience building rugged boats serving the Pacific Northwest coast booming grounds. The powerful little 12-to-16-foot-long (3.7 to 4.9 m) boats were known as "log broncs" due to the boat's action from the popular azimuth drive, which would cause the boat to rear up like a rodeo horse when the props were spun around 180 degrees.

The 19BB features a 260-horsepower (190 kW) Cummins 6BTA 5.9-litre (360 in^{3}) pod-mounted engine paired with a ZF 4:1 reduction marine transmission powering a conventional propeller with a 36-inch (91 cm) nozzle. The L-drive configuration allows the boat to turn in 1.5 times its length, and delivers 7,000 to 7,500 pounds (3,200 to 3,400 kg) of bollard pull.

The General Services Administration auctioned one 19BB previously stationed at NSB Kings Bay in 2006, and remaining examples are still in use at the Boston Navy Yard, Naval Base Kitsap, Naval Station Norfolk, Naval Base Point Loma, and United States Fleet Activities Sasebo.

As of 2026, it is the smallest active-duty US Navy vessel.
