= Baron of Renfrew (ship) =

Disposable wooden ship, broken up in 1825

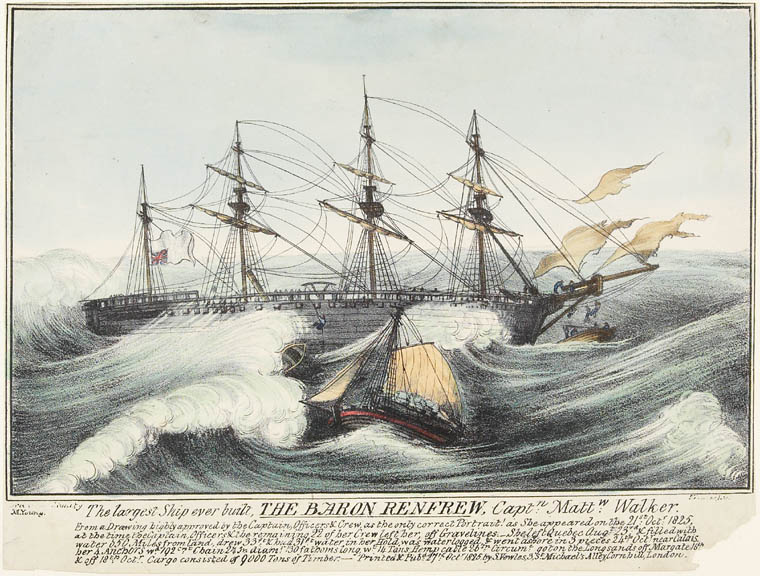
- Baron of Renfrew, lithograph from the Peter Winkworth Collection of Canadiana, Library and Archives Canada

History

United Kingdom
- Name: Baron of Renfrew
- Namesake: Baron of Renfrew
- Builder: Charles Wood, Anse du Fort, Quebec, Canada
- Launched: 1825
- Fate: Lost

General characteristics
- Class & type: Disposable ship
- Tonnage: 5,294 GRT
- Length: 304 ft (93 m)
- Beam: 61 ft (19 m)
- Draught: 34 ft (10 m)
- Sail plan: Four-masted barque
- Complement: Crew of 25

Baron of Renfrew was a four-masted barque of 5,294 gross register tonnage (GRT), built of wood in 1825 by Charles Wood in Quebec, Canada. She was one of the largest wooden ships ever built, although she was a disposable ship built for a one-way voyage to transport timber to England and did not complete a single voyage before breaking up.

== History ==
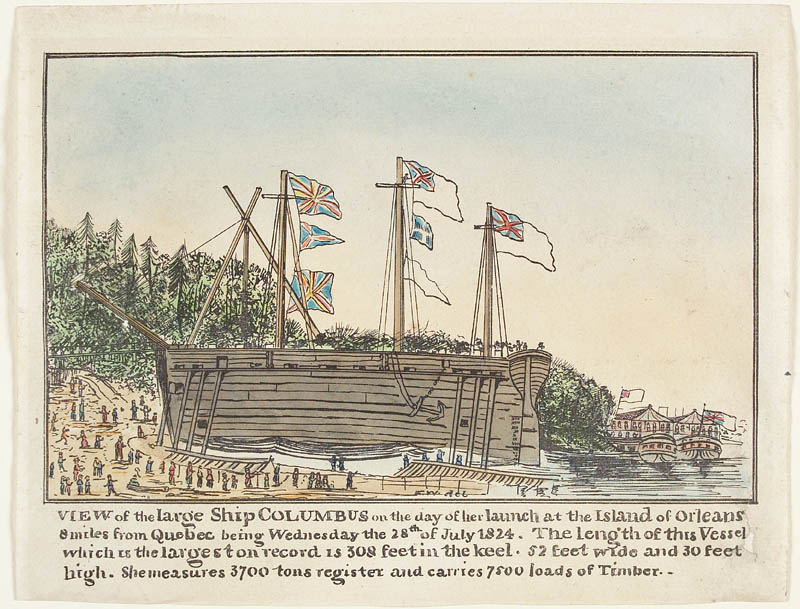
Launching of Columbus

Baron of Renfrew was built to transport timber from the New World to Europe and to be disassembled after discharging the timber cargo to sell the tax-free ship-timber, because the timber used to build the ship was exempt from the high taxes on imported timber. She was built by Charles Wood, Anse du Fort, Quebec, Canada, on his own account. She followed the construction of a similar disposable ship, the barque Columbus built the year before.

On August 23, 1825, under the command of captain Matthew Walker, the ship left Quebec with a crew of 25 men and a cargo of 9,000 tons timber (probably ship and cargo weight, both timber) bound for London, England. On October 21 of the same year the ship appeared in the English Channel but stranded the day after on the Goodwin Sands near Long Sound Head in the Channel already under tow of two tugs and a pilot on board. It is reported that parts of the ship and her timber cargo were found on the French coast near Dunkirk and Gravelines, according to other sources the ship, broken in three parts, were found near Calais.

The huge ship had a length overall of 92.65 metres with bowsprit and jibboom: 110.8 metres (363 feet), 18.59 metres wide and 10.36 metres tall (304 feet × 61 feet × 34 feet). She was rigged as a four-masted barque, with the square-rigged masts fitted with just three square sails (course, top, and topgallant sails) and the spanker mast with a spanker sail and a spanker topsail. Three foresails were fitted to the stays to the jibboom making 14 sails all in all. Instead of a bobstay the end of the bowsprit was supported by an extra spar (bar) resting on the cutwater above the waterline.

21st: Octr: 1825, at the time the Captain, Officers & remaining 22 of her crew left her, off Gravelines. - She left Quebec Augt. 23rd & filled with water 650 Miles from land, drew 33 ft. & had 31 ft. water in her Hold, was waterlogged & went ashore in 3 pieces 24th Octr: near Calais. Her 4 Anchors wd. 192 cwt. Chain 2 1/4 In. diamr: 130 fathoms long, wt. 14 Tons Hemp cable 26 In. Circume: got on the Long sands off Margate 16th & off 18th Octr: Cargo consisted of 9000 Tons of Timber.

Baron of Renfrew is classified as a disposable ship, or timber ship (timber drogher). She was not particularly seaworthy:

She left Quebec Augt. 23rd & filled with water 650 Miles from land, drew 33 ft. & had 31 ft. water in her Hold, was waterlogged & went ashore in 3 pieces 24th Octr: near Calais.

and had to be towed from Quebec to Calais.

== Legacy ==
Due to a later change in the timber tax census disposable or timber ships lost their tax advantage and ceased to be built. Baron of Renfrew was slightly larger than Columbus built the year before; although as both vessels were disposable ships, they were not considered true ships by some. The Nova Scotia ship William D. Lawrence remains the largest sailing ship built in Canada.

== See also ==
- Baron of Renfrew (title)

== Sources ==
- Wallace, Fredrick William: Wooden Ships and Iron Men. White Lion, London, 1973/1924.
- Williams, David M.: Bulk Carriers and Timber Imports: The British North American Trade and the Shipping Boom of 1824-5. The Mariner's Mirror Vol. 54, London, 1968. pp. 373–382
