= Disposable ship =

Ship or sea vessel intended for use on a single voyage

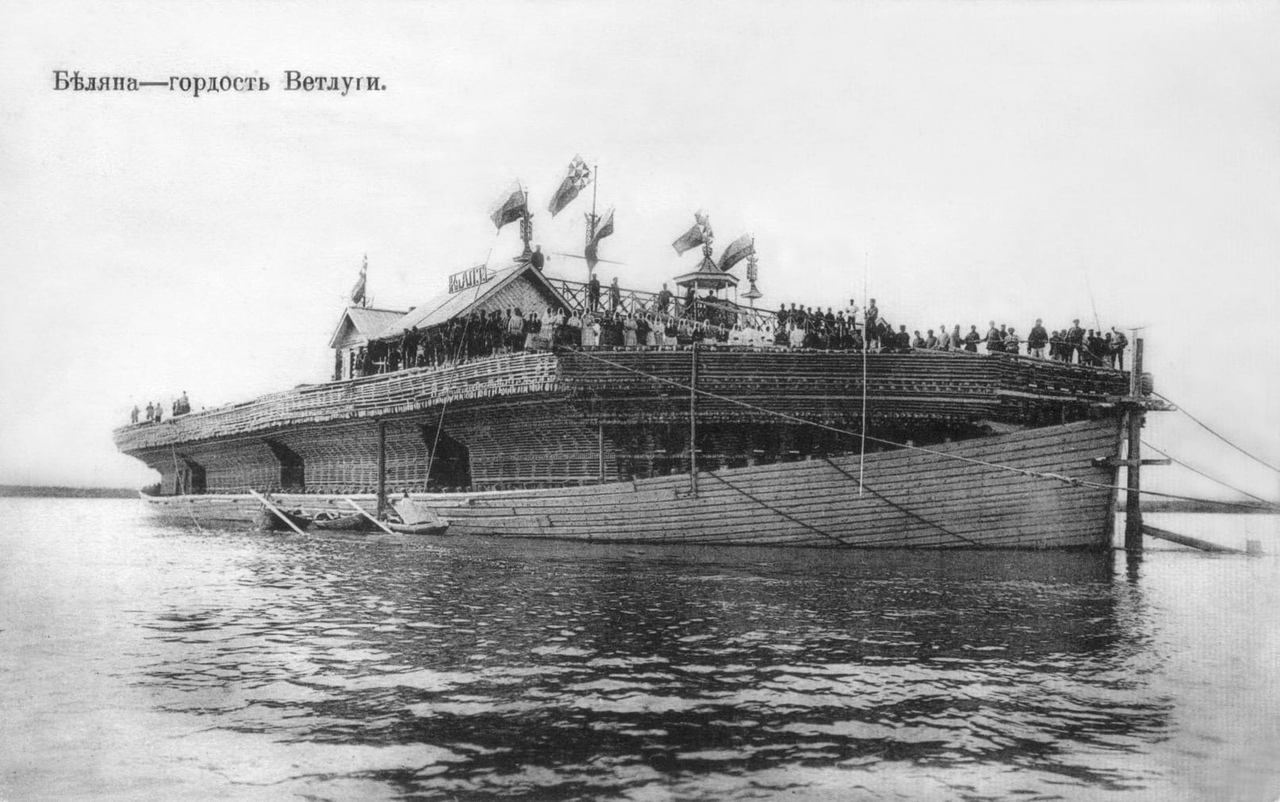
Decorated belyana, 1911

A disposable ship, also called raft ship, timber ship, or timber drogher is a ship or sea vessel that is intended for use on a single voyage. At the final destination, the vessel is broken up for sale or reuse of materials. Until the end of the 19th century, such ships were common on major rivers such as the Danube and the Rhine in Central Europe and the Mississippi in North America. There were also saltwater vessels that were primarily built for one-time sailing to break up. Some of the largest wooden ships in history were of this type.

== Downstream navigation ==
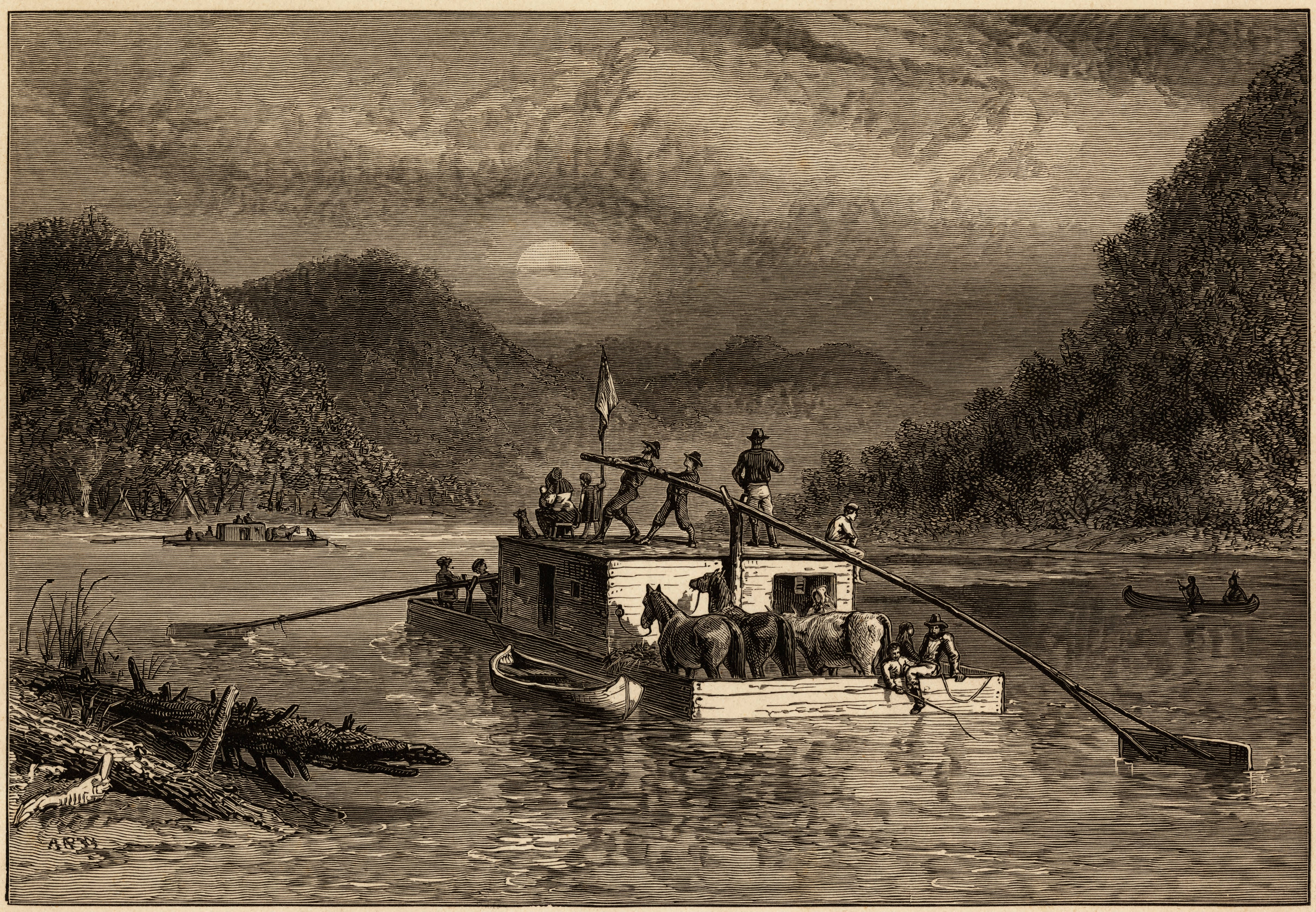
Travelers aboard a flatboat on a moonlit night

Most rivers have a current that flows towards their mouths, so it is possible to float with the water flow, using only anchors and rudders to maneuver. But before the advent of steam power, vessels traveling upstream had to use sails or human or animal towing. It was thus convenient to send cargo downstream on simple barge-like vessels on a one-way trip.

In North America, as the land around the Mississippi was cleared and developed, there was a need for cheap transportation to the larger port cities such as New Orleans, but it was not possible to return upstream. Agricultural goods such as potatoes, tobacco, cotton, alcoholic beverages (whiskey), grain, and live animals (cattle, chickens, and pigs) could be transported on a flatboat. The farmer Jacob Yoder of Pennsylvania built the first flatboat at Old Redstone Fort on the Monongahela River in 1781. His parents had come from Switzerland, where the navigable rivers and lakes had flat-bottomed boats known as Weidling for fishing, freight and passenger transport. Yoder designed a boat that was nothing more than a simple box whose construction was so simple that it could be built by inexperienced people with tools and minimal boat building skills which could be carried downstream by the river current.

The farmers would sell their agricultural products and the boat downstream, where the boat was broken up, and the wood reused. As wheel steamers took over the traffic, it led to a short-term upswing in the use of the flatboats, as the farmers could return home within a few days, or get the flatboats in tow upstream to the starting point. In the middle of the 19th century, wheeled steamers and railways began to replace flatboats, as machine-driven transport was faster and more capable. Abraham Lincoln served as a flatboatman in 1828 and 1831.

Belyanas, disposable ships for timber rafting, were used in Russia from 16th to 20th centuries around the Volga and Vetluga rivers. Some of the largest vessels were more than 120 meters long and could carry around 12,000 tons. They were common until the beginning of the 20th century, when the railway began to take over timber transport.

In the 400s BC Herodotus wrote of disposable boats sailing from Armenia to Babylon.

I am going to indicate what seems to me to be the most marvellous thing in the country, next to the city itself. Their boats which ply the river and go to Babylon are all of skins, and round.

They make these in Armenia, higher up the stream than Assyria. First they cut frames of willow, then they stretch hides over these for a covering, making as it were a hold; they neither broaden the stern nor narrow the prow, but the boat is round, like a shield. They then fill it with reeds and send it floating down the river with a cargo; and it is for the most part palm wood casks of wine that they carry down.

Two men standing upright steer the boat, each with a paddle, one drawing it to him, the other thrusting it from him. These boats are of all sizes, some small, some very large; the largest of them are of as much as five thousand talents burden. There is a live ass in each boat, or more than one in the larger.

So when they have floated down to Babylon and disposed of their cargo, they sell the framework of the boat and all the reeds; the hides are set on the backs of asses, which are then driven back to Armenia, for it is not by any means possible to go upstream by water, because of the swiftness of the current; it is for this reason that they make their boats of hides and not of wood. When they have driven their asses back into Armenia, they make more boats in the same way.

— Herodotus, The Histories (1.194.1 to 1.194.5), A. D. Godley translation (1920)

== Timber freight over the sea ==
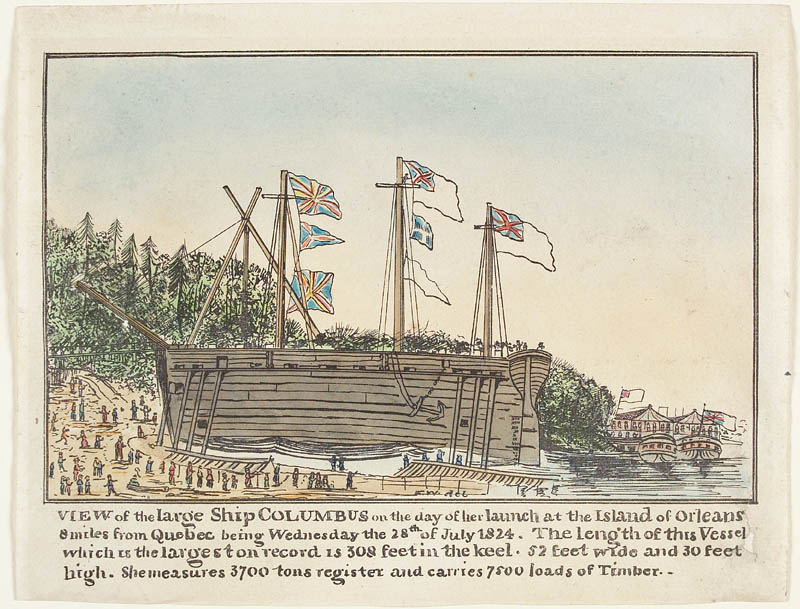
Timber ship Columbus, launched in 1824 to sail from Canada to England

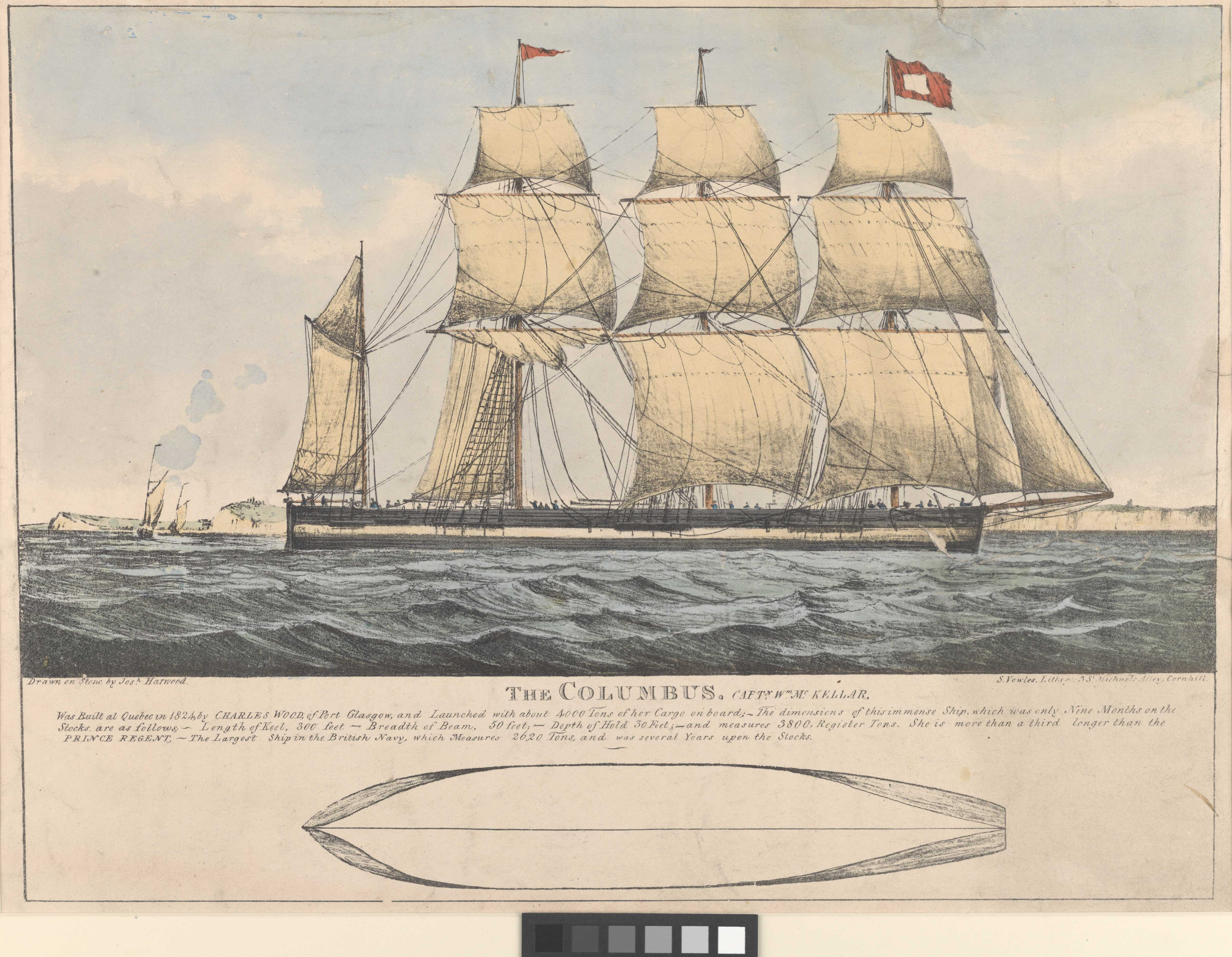
Columbus en route across the Atlantic in 1824. Lithograph from the National Maritime Museum, Greenwich, London.

The disposable ship avoided two problems that adversely impacted profitability of shipping in the British timber trade; high taxes and small cargoes.

The structural timbers of a "disposable ship" were exempt from high British taxes imposed on "oak and square pine timber" cargoes. In the 19th century, these taxes eventually reached 275% of the value of the timber cargo. Further, the return voyage from England to North America was unnecessary. Typically, return trip cargo volume was one-tenth that of the timbers brought to England. This usually required the use of ballast stones to establish the proper vessel trim and maneuverability. Ballast stones had no significant commercial value and ballast loading and unloading was costly and time-consuming.

The first ship, the Columbus, was launched on July 28, 1824, from the slipway at Anse-du-Fort, on the island of Orleans near the city of Quebec, after being built by Charles Wood of Port Glasgow. Wood had ensured that the construction could be broken up and that the ship's timber in the hull could be reused. Thus, the four-masted bark ship was flat-bottomed and barely elegant as a sailing ship. Its dimensions were 94 m (308 feet) keel length, 15.8 m (52 feet) wide and 9.1 m (30 feet) high with register tonnage of 3,700 tonnes and cargo tonnage of 7,500 tonnes. With a load of 10,000 tonnes of timber, Columbus was towed by the tugboat Hercules out to sea where it then sailed on 6 September. Captain William Mckellar grounded at Bersimis in St. Lawrence on September 9, but continued on and reached the anchorage known as The Downs off the coast of Kent. From there, Columbus was brought into Blackwall Reach where the cargo was brought ashore. But the shipowners wanted to send the ship back to Canada against the shipbuilder's advice. On the way back, the ship sank as a total loss on the English Channel on May 17, 1825.

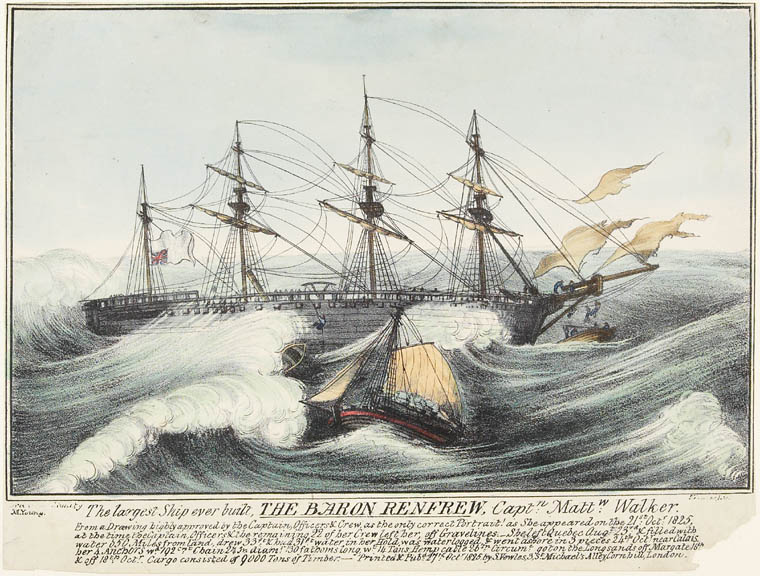
Baron of Renfrew, a large disposable timber ship launched in 1825 to sail from Canada to England

The success of Columbus despite the sinking due to a mistake was followed by the launch of Baron of Renfrew in June 1825. But, although the construction remained the same, the new ship had been enlarged, and when launched it caught fire while sliding on the slip. The dimensions were 92 meters (304 feet) in length, 18 meters (61 feet) in width and 10.4 meters in height with a registry tonnage of 5,295 tons and cargo tonnage of 9,000 tons.

With Captain Matthew Walker and a crew of 25 men, the Baron of Renfrew sailed out to the Atlantic on August 23, 1825. Like the Columbus, the ship reached the European Atlantic coast when it sailed into the English Channel on October 21. But there had been a leak on board the Baron of Renbow, which eventually took in more and more water and became waterlogged as a result. The four-masted bark then grounded on Goodwin Sands at Long Sound Head. The captain chose to leave the ship and left the salvage to two tugboats who came to assistance. During the shipwreck, the ship was broken into three pieces which ended up on the beaches of Calais on 24 October. The timber could still be salvaged so the transportation was successful. The two ships were described as "rafts" in their time, and attracted attention with their unusual construction and size, with the Baron of Renfrew being 110.8 meters (363 feet) long. But they were a one-time attempt as it was no longer profitable to transport timber from North America to Britain. The Baron of Renfrew was one of the largest wooden sailing vessels ever built.

After the loss of the two disposable ships in the year 1825, the British timber market had changed when it reoriented towards trade with the Baltic coast again. This ended with the acceptance of the principle of free trade in 1840, which, among other things, saw the repeal of the Navigation Act in 1849. By then, the British had already begun to seek foreign timber as far away as Burma.

== Timber freight as a raft ==
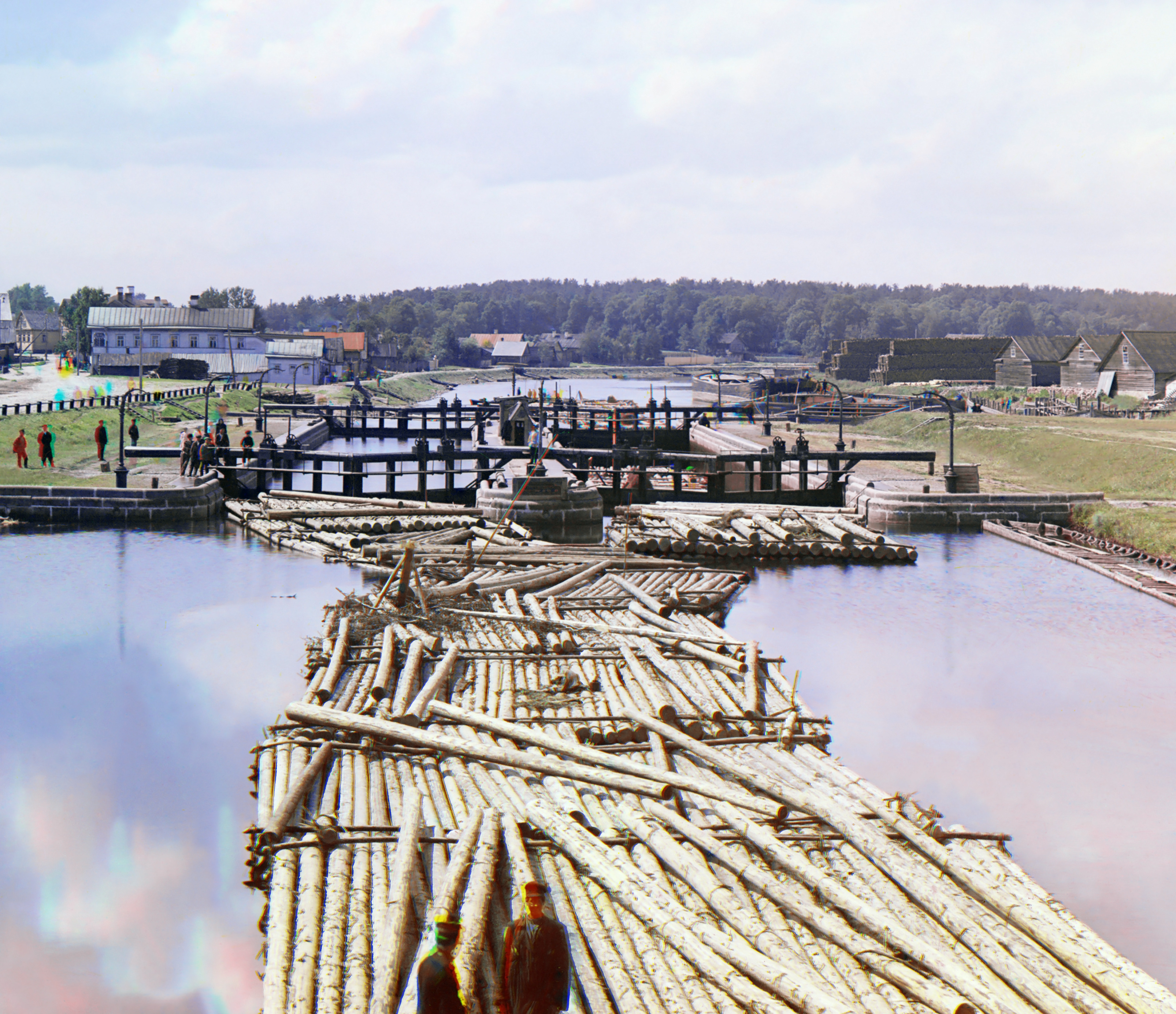
Lumber rafts on the Peter I Canal. Early 20th-century picture by S. Prokudin-Gorsky.

Timber rafts have existed from time immemorial as disposable vessels as they were usually just logs attached to each other for temporary duration, and it was very common for the timber rafts at the terminus to be broken up for sale of the logs. But sometimes naval structures were constructed that turned these into refined sea craft.

A second form of transport was by laying the logs on top of each other in several layers. This method was used on the Central European rivers. There, the growing need for timber led to a large naval structures being seen on the Rhine and other rivers. The largest could be up to 500 meters long and 80 meters wide with a height or thickness of up to 3 meters. They were called Kapitalflöße and had up to 51,000 m^{3} in timber capacity. A typical Holländervlot en route to the Netherlands could be 200 meters long and 40 meters wide. As such a large vessel had to be able to navigate through narrow and winding river courses, the fleet had many small boats with it, a large crew and many oars - very large and long oars up to 21 meters in length were used. The raft was "articulated", in that it could bend in several sections, the front and aft were called "knees". Several buildings had been erected in the middle, as the crew could consist of several hundred men, up to 500 to 800 of the largest. Gradually the giant fleets were broken up, but it was only when they reached Dordrecht or Rotterdam that they were broken up into smaller pieces and taken ashore or carried on. Due to its size, other ship traffic on the river had to be stopped as the fleets floated downstream, because the fragile composition meant that the fleets had to have the right to navigate all navigable rivers. They were difficult to handle, with braking distances of up to 2 km despite many anchors that were included. With steam-powered boats, timber hauling gradually became commonplace, and from 1952 it was no longer allowed to let the timber rafts drift downstream without tugs.

== See also ==
- Timber rafting
