= Belyana =

Type of ship found in Russia

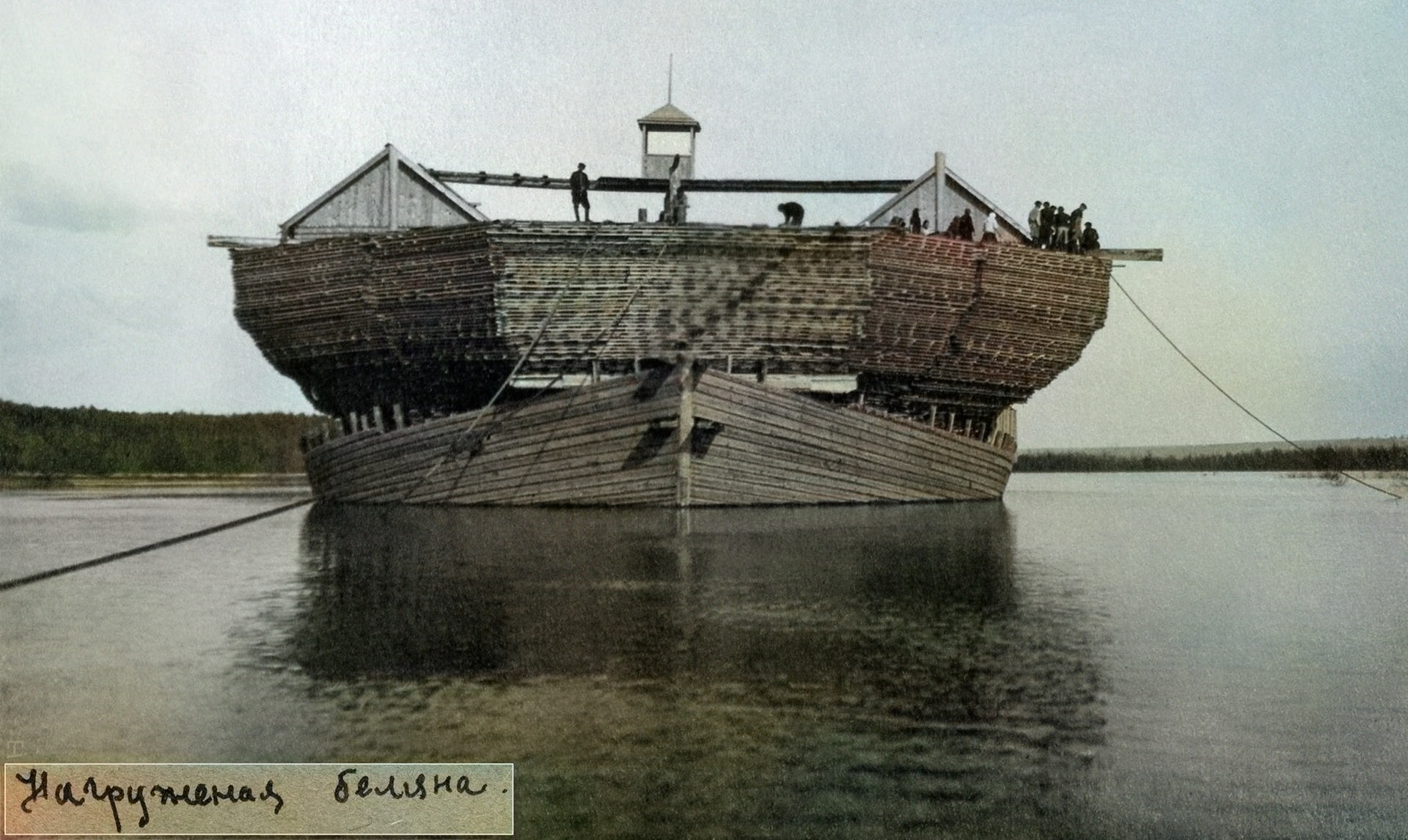
Loaded belyana, 1931

A belyana (Russian: Беляна) was a type of large disposable ship that was used for timber rafting along the rivers Volga and Kama from the end of the 16th century until the middle of the 20th century. Belyanas were among the largest wooden ships ever built, with the largest ones being up to 120 metres (390 ft) long with a load capacity up to 12,800 tons.

Belyanas were built in the Upper Volga region of Russia without any special tools or plans. Never motorized, after 1870 they also had no sails and could only float downriver, using specialized anchors to turn and stop. Each year in the 18th and 19th centuries hundreds of belyanas were built and floated to Astrakhan, where they were entirely dismantled and the wood sold. With the development of railroads in the Soviet Union, belyanas became too complex and too expensive; the last belyana was built in 1939.

In 2015 tourists found the remains of a wooden ship in the Vetluga river; archaeologists determined that it was an 80-meter-long belyana that caught fire some 350 years ago and was abandoned by its crew. It is the only known finding of such a vessel.

== History ==
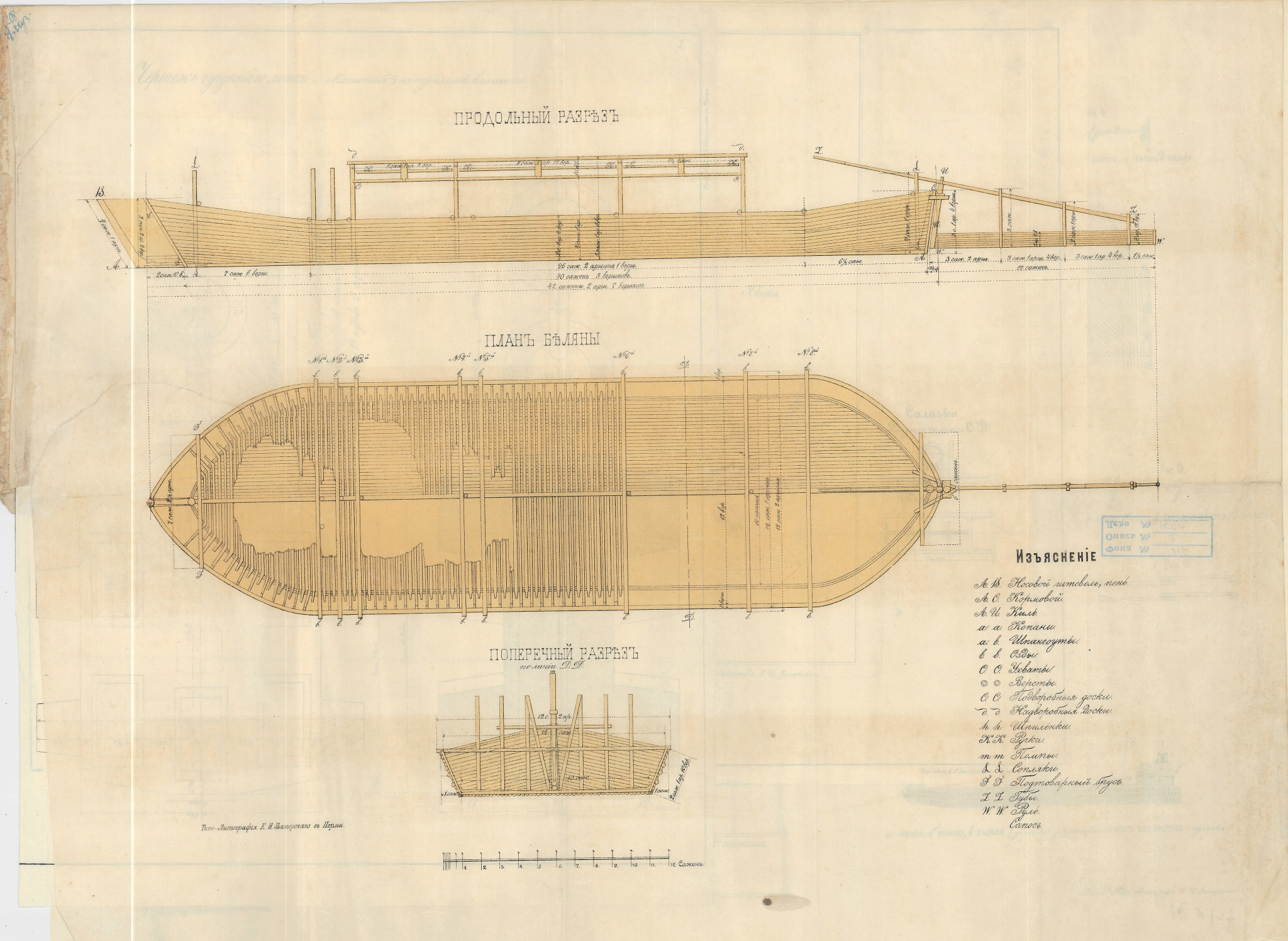
Scheme of the 70-meter-long belyana, Perm, before 1917

Belyanas were built since the 16th–17th centuries at the places of timber extraction in the Upper Volga region and on the Kama, and were designed for a single trip downstream. The main cargo was timber, in some cases bark fibre, mats, and other similar goods. The length of the hull was up to 120 meters, the width 25 meters, the height 5 meters, the load capacity up to 12,800 tons. The hull was not tarred, which determined the name of such a ship, беляна, derived from the Russian word белый, "white", as opposed to tarred ships, which were black. The cargo could be placed in the hull and in the superstructure with gradual expansion to the sides (up to 2.5–3 meters). There was no upper deck. Dense stacking of the loaded timber was used to achieve an acceptable structural strength of the ship. Two or three holes for anchors and probes were made directly above the laid cargo, and cabins (Note: Such cabin for the crew on belyana was called "kazyonka" (Russian: казёнка)) were also erected, where the crew lived during the floating. The vessel traveled 2000 to 3500 km during the trip.

Small belyanas had a draught of 2.5 to 2.8 meters and could carry up to 1600 tonnes; medium belyanas had a draught of approximately 3.5 m and could carry 3200 tonnes; the large ones had a draught of 5 m and could carry between 7200 and 12,800 tonnes.

Logging and sailing on the river were carried out in the absence of any mechanization. Workers went to cut wood in groups, bringing food from home. For three to four months they lived in the forest without returning home, contenting themselves with a meager and monotonous diet and sleeping in small winter huts that did not heat well. On the banks of the Usta and Vetluga, the bark was peeled from the logs, and then the belyana was built and loaded.

Some of the smaller vessels were assembled and disassembled twice in one season. These were the ones that went to places where the Volga is close to the Don river. The ship docked at the shore, all the cargo was transported by horse- or ox-drawn carriage to the Don. The vessel was then disassembled, the material was transported, reassembled, reloaded and released to the lower reaches of the Don, where it was unloaded and dismantled a second time.

In 1884 there were 120 belyanas on the Volga, and in 1885 152 were built.

== Construction and equipment ==
About 240 pine and 200 spruce logs were needed to build a medium-sized belyana. The flat bottom was made of spruce and the walls were made of pine. The distance between the frames was not more than half a meter, due to which the strength of the hull was extremely high. The vessels were originally built without a single nail and only later, in the 19th century, did iron nails begin to be used. No tarring was performed, and the logs were simply tied tightly together.

Building and loading of belyana at Milutin factory, 1931

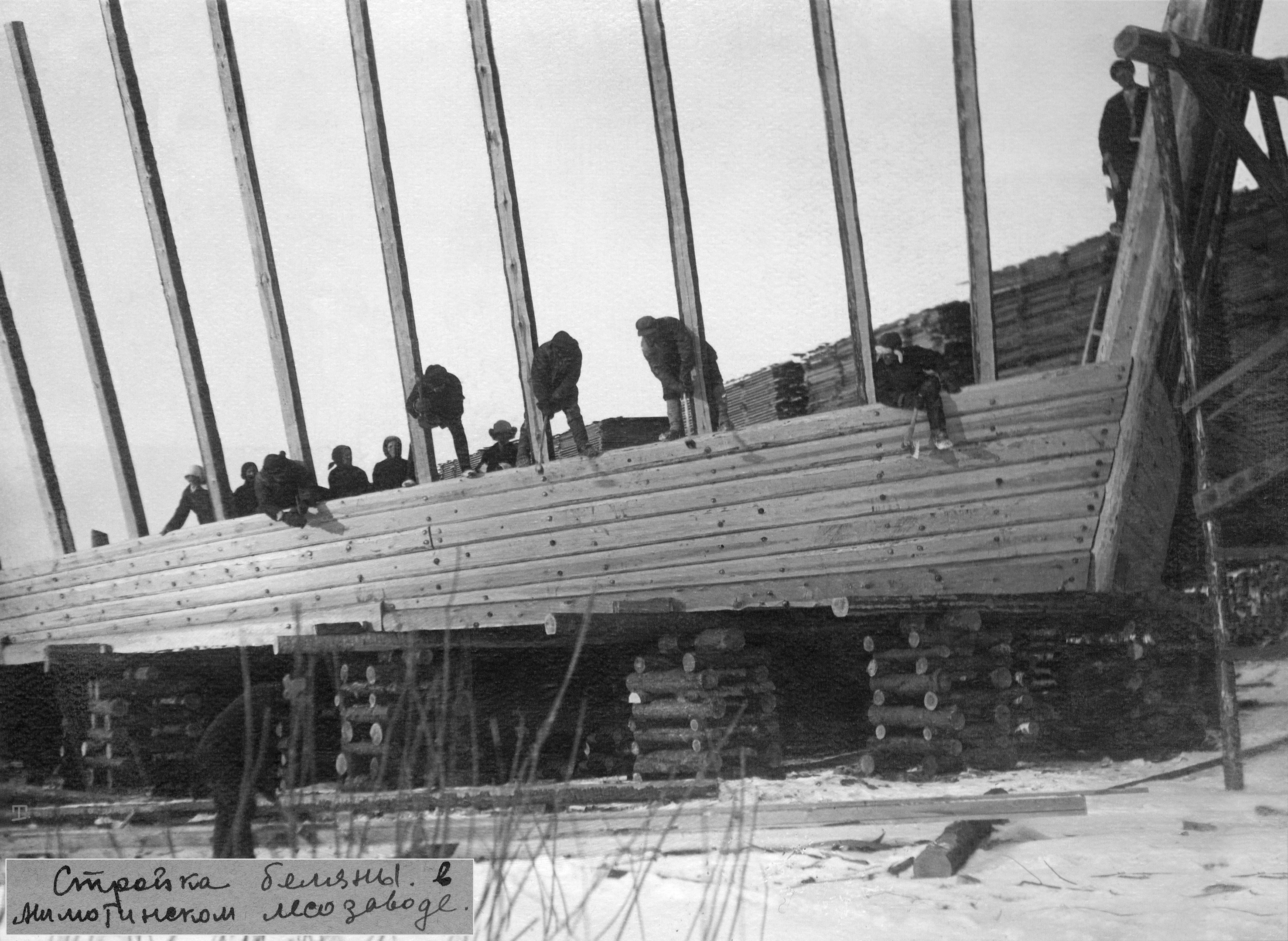
Hull planking. The hull is placed on stands, called 'gorodok' (Russian: городок), that allow easy access to every part of it.

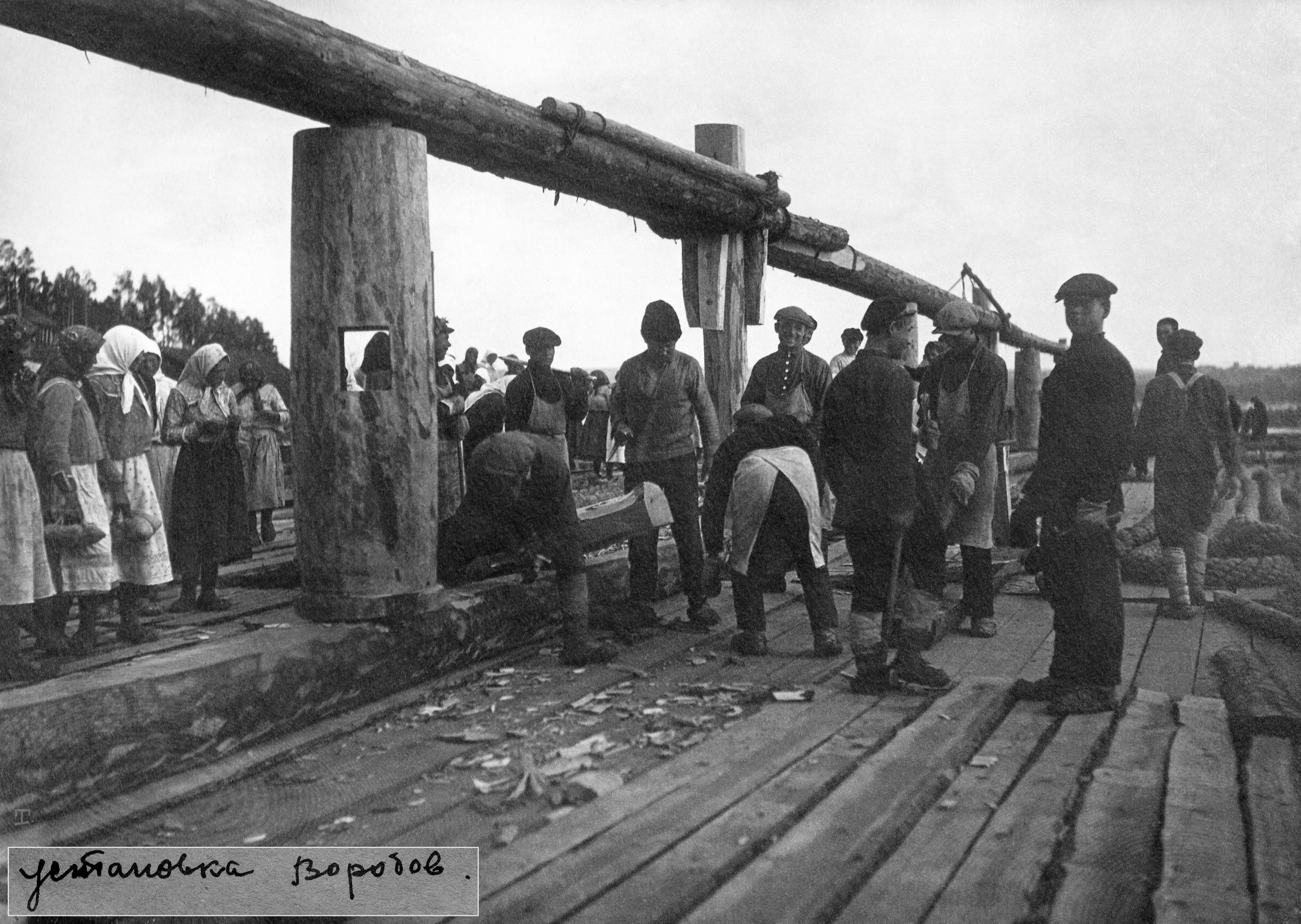
During construction

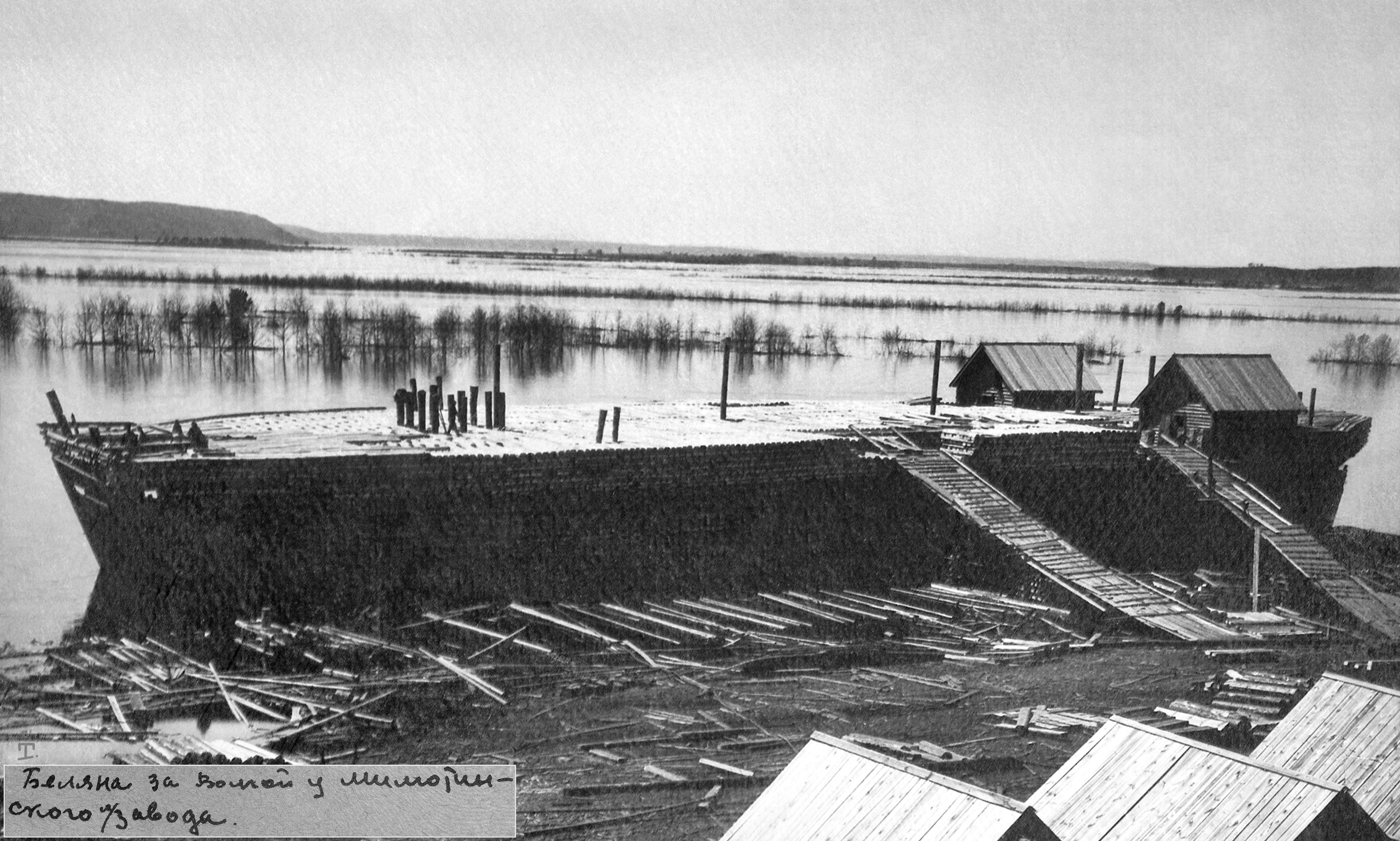
Loading, sideview

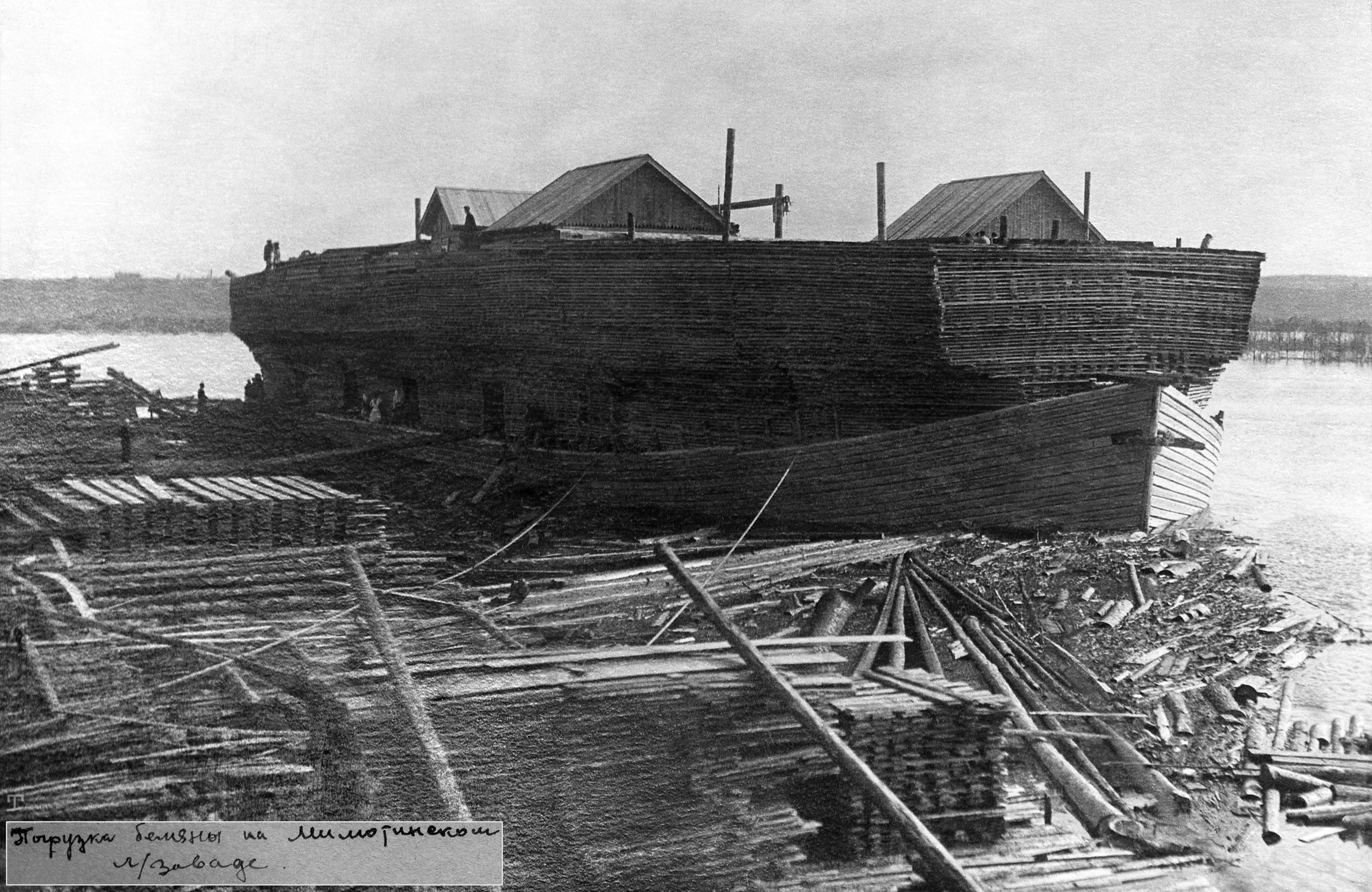
Loading

The load of logs, beams and planks was distributed in even rows with wide openings between them so as to provide quick access to its bottom in the event of a breach or other accident. In addition, properly laid logs dry faster, which protects them from rot. In order to withstand the pressure of the water from the outside, the internal load did not touch the boards, and wedges were driven between it and the boards.

As soon as the load began to exceed the height of the board, the next logs were laid so that they protruded outwards and a new load was placed on them. Such protrusions were made bilaterally and very carefully so as not to disturb the balance of the ship. The resulting widenings sometimes protruded beyond the board by four or more meters—the total width of the vessel at the top could be much larger than the bottom.

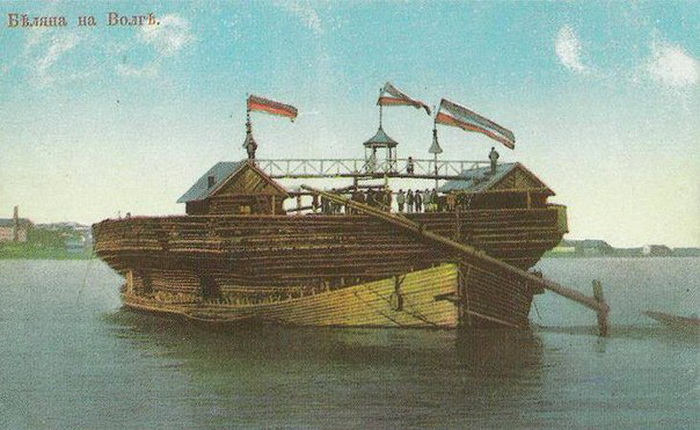
Belyana decorated with flags. The rudder is on right, and a dory is rafted alongside on the Belyana's right.

The deck was also a load, usually of cut boards, and was similar in size to that of a modern aircraft carrier. It had two to four holes for lifting heavy anchors and tightening the ropes holding the rudder. Two cabins were installed near the stern, and served as a balance and as quarters for the crew. A high transverse bridge was built between their roofs with a cabin cut in the middle, where the pilot was located. This cabin was usually covered with wood carvings, and sometimes even painted with gold paint.

Although the belyanas were functional vessels, they were richly decorated with flags—not only state and commercial, but also the flags of a particular merchant, which most often depicted the blessings of saints or some symbols appropriate to the occasion. Sometimes they were so large that they flew over the ship like sails.

There were 15 to 35 sailors on a typical ship, and up to 100 on the largest ones. Most of them worked on the pumps that pumped water from the hull, which tended to flood during the journey. About 10 to 12 pumps were provided, and the ship was loaded so that its bow was immersed in the water deeper than the stern and all the incoming water drained there.

Steps of belyana construction

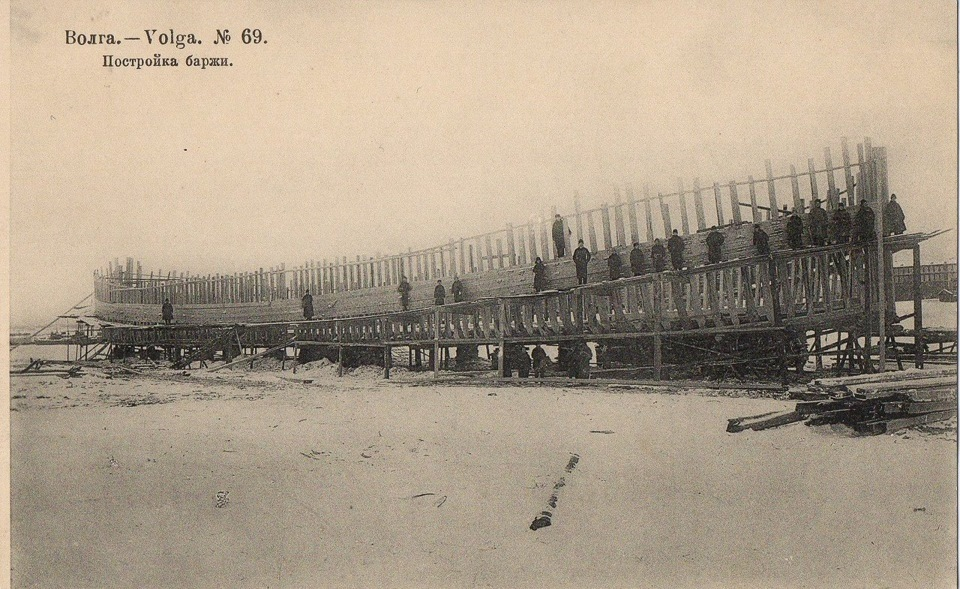
Hull planking underway

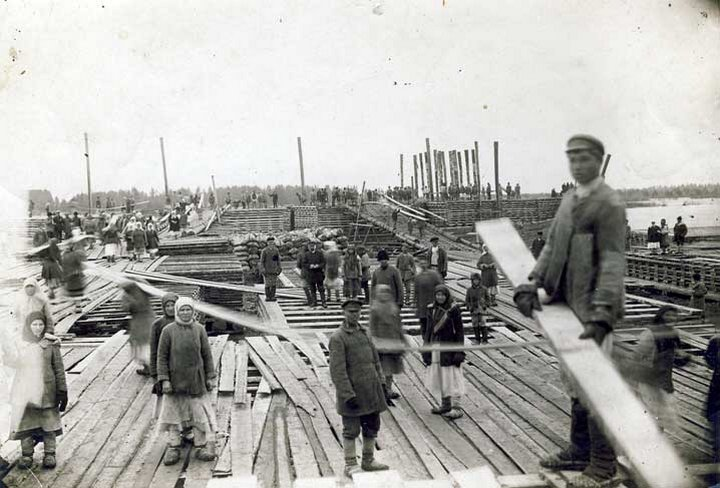
During construction

== Origin and destinations ==
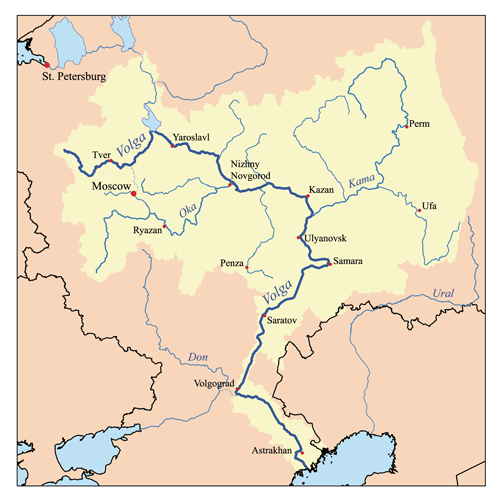
Map of the Volga watershed

Wood for the building and loading of belyanas was sourced from the banks of the Volga and Vetluga tributaries: Medyana, Chernaya, Lapshanga, Sentyaga, Janushka, Usta, Bakovka, Belenkaya, and Yaktanga. Wood was gathered in winter; loggers spent the winter in the forest, cutting down the trees and preparing them for a transportation. Loggers lived in zimnitsa (Russian: зимница), temporary houses in a forest. In spring, logs were delivered to sawmills, where they were processed into marketable condition.

When the river had returned to normal after the spring flood and all the logs were ready, construction of belyanas started. Typically, the construction took the entire summer, finishing in autumn. The first step was construction of a hull with fir beams and pine boards. After the core was built, the loading started. A belyana was loaded in a specific order, with the purpose to place as many goods as possible but also to maintain the buoyancy and stability of the vessel. This process was long and required many workers. Vladimir Dal in his Explanatory Dictionary of the Living Great Russian Language wrote that in the Russian language there is a saying: “You can disassemble the belyana with your hands and you won't be able to assemble it with the help of an entire city”. (Note: "Разберу беляну (судно) одними руками, не соберешь беляны всеми городами?") In the spring, the floods floated the belyana, and its 2000–to–3500 km trip to the Lower Volga started.

Frequent destinations for belyanas were Saratov, Tsaritsyn (today's Volgograd), and Astrakhan, where the timber and hull were dismantled for firewood or went to sawmills for final processing. The boats' cabins were sold as ready-made houses. Belyanas did not go further than Astrakhan on the Caspian Sea. Only the smallest belyanas, loaded with fish in Astrakhan, went back, pulled upstream by burlaks. Maintaining a vessel for more than one season was unprofitable. In particularly active years, up to 60 to 150 belyanas sailed the Volga. The value of a belyana could be between 100,000 and 150,000 rubles (c. 1910).

Belyanas flourished in the middle of the 19th century, at the beginning of the massive arrival of steamboats on the rivers. At first, steamboats exclusively burned wood, which had to be brought to the towns of the lower Volga, where the steppe expanses dominated. Up to 500 steamships on the Volga needed large quantities of firewood to propel them.

== Floating ==
The floating of belyana required special skills. There were no sails, and boatmen labor was not used. The pilot, who drove the belyana, had to perfectly know the river and the vessel. For this reason, the pilot was present during the construction phase, as all belyanas were individually built. The control was carried out with a huge rudder placed in the stern, which was rotated by means of a large, long and thick rod, taken out of the stern of the deck. For this reason the vessel moved not with the nose forward, but with the stern, in order to provide an ability to operate with a lot—a round iron casting with the "ear" for tying the rope with—that should always be dragged behind the vessel. To control the rudder, two iron lots, a riskovy (swivel) anchor and parking anchor were used. The right lot was bigger, weighing between 3200 and 4000 kg for large belyanas and 2400 to 3200 for smaller ones, the left lot was smaller, weighing between 2880 and 3200 kg for large and 1600 and 2400 kg for small vessels. The rudder at the vessel can be effective in cases when the ship speed is less than the flow rate or exceeds the latter. To adjust the speed of the ship and maneuver, two lots were lowered into the water from both sides of the vessel. If both lots simultaneously touched the bottom, the motion of the belyana was stopped. If the right lot was lifted off the bottom, the belyana turned left; if the left one was lifted, it turned right. The riskovy anchor was used at very tight turns.

In order to maintain the belyana on its way, the vessel was equipped with three special boats, called zavoznya (Russian: завозня) and four to five boats of various sizes. A zavoznya was a big boat with a carrying capacity of 5–10 tons, used to operate lots and anchors. A belyana should have one nine-meter-long zavoznya and two smaller, seven-meter-long ones. Light boats were used in cases when it was necessary to examine the river bed, go to the shore, etc.

Lots were not used before the 1870s, and belyanas were operated by 60–80 rowers; the vessels also had a mast with a big sail. Instead of the lot the big anchor was used for deceleration. Zavoznya with a big riskovy anchor was also used in order to avoid dangerous places. After the lots were invented, masts and sail were no longer erected on the vessels and there were 30 to 40 members of the crew. A crewmember earned 30 to 40 rubles for a passage. The pilot was paid 400 to 600 rubles.

Belyanas of different sizes

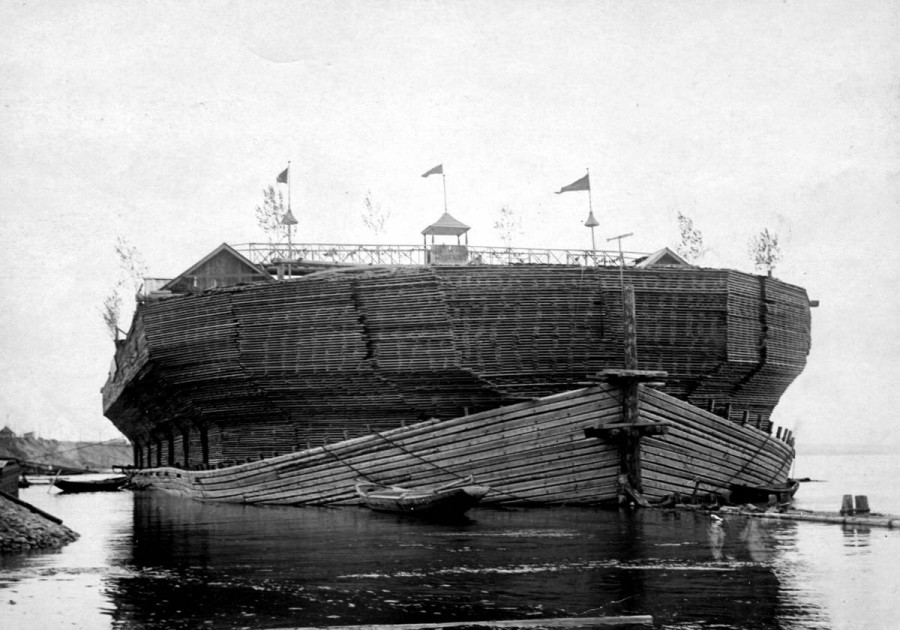
Belyana with at least 7 spans

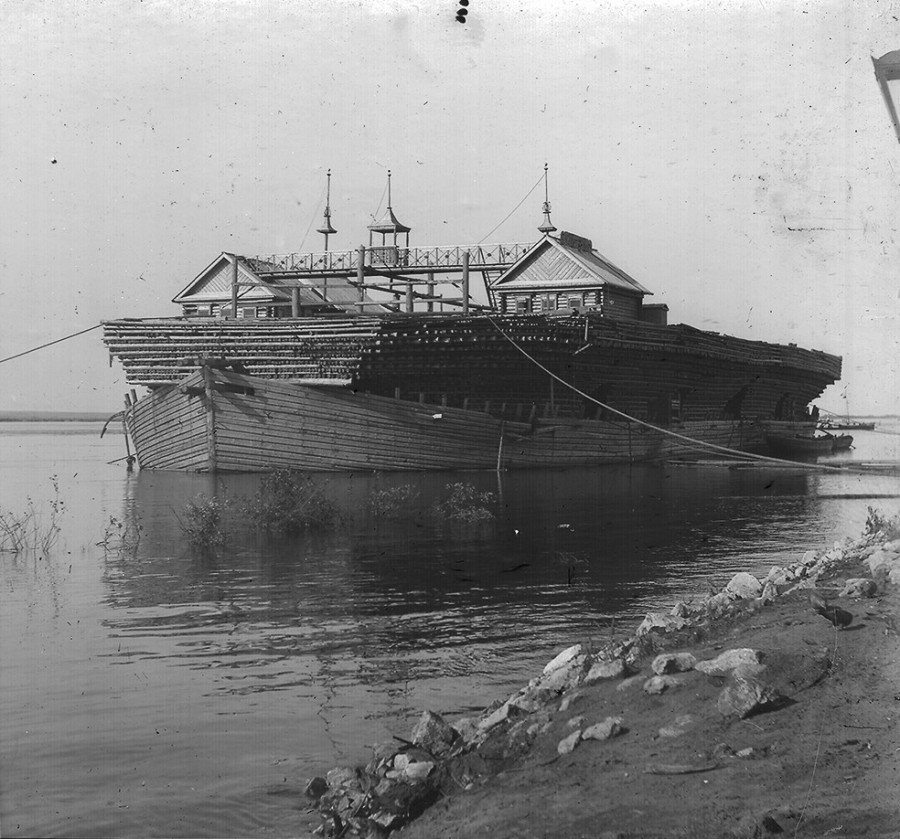
Belyana with 5 spans. The value of this belyana was between 80 and 90 thousand rubles in 1910/1911.

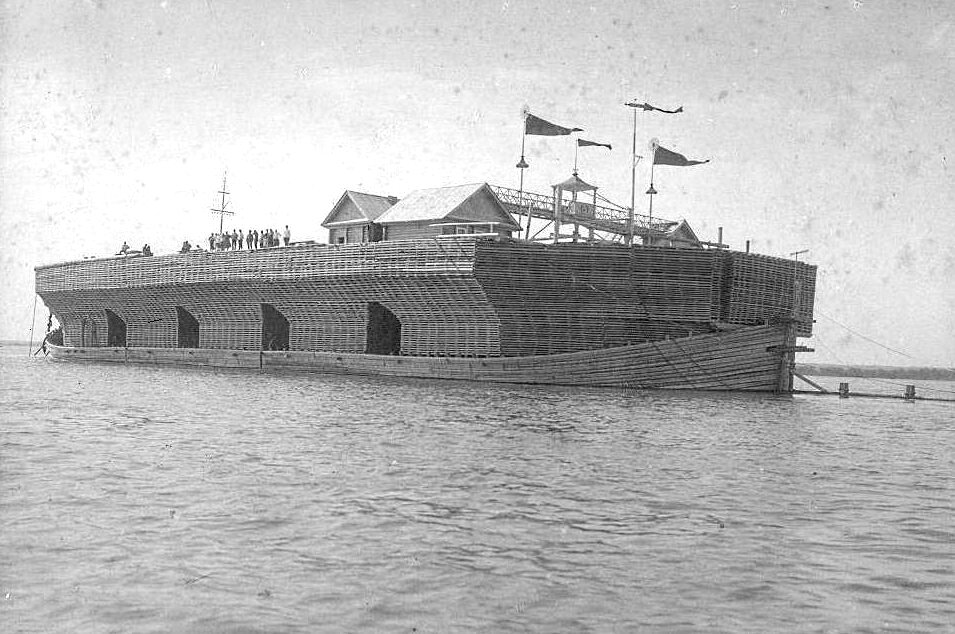
Belyana with 5 spans

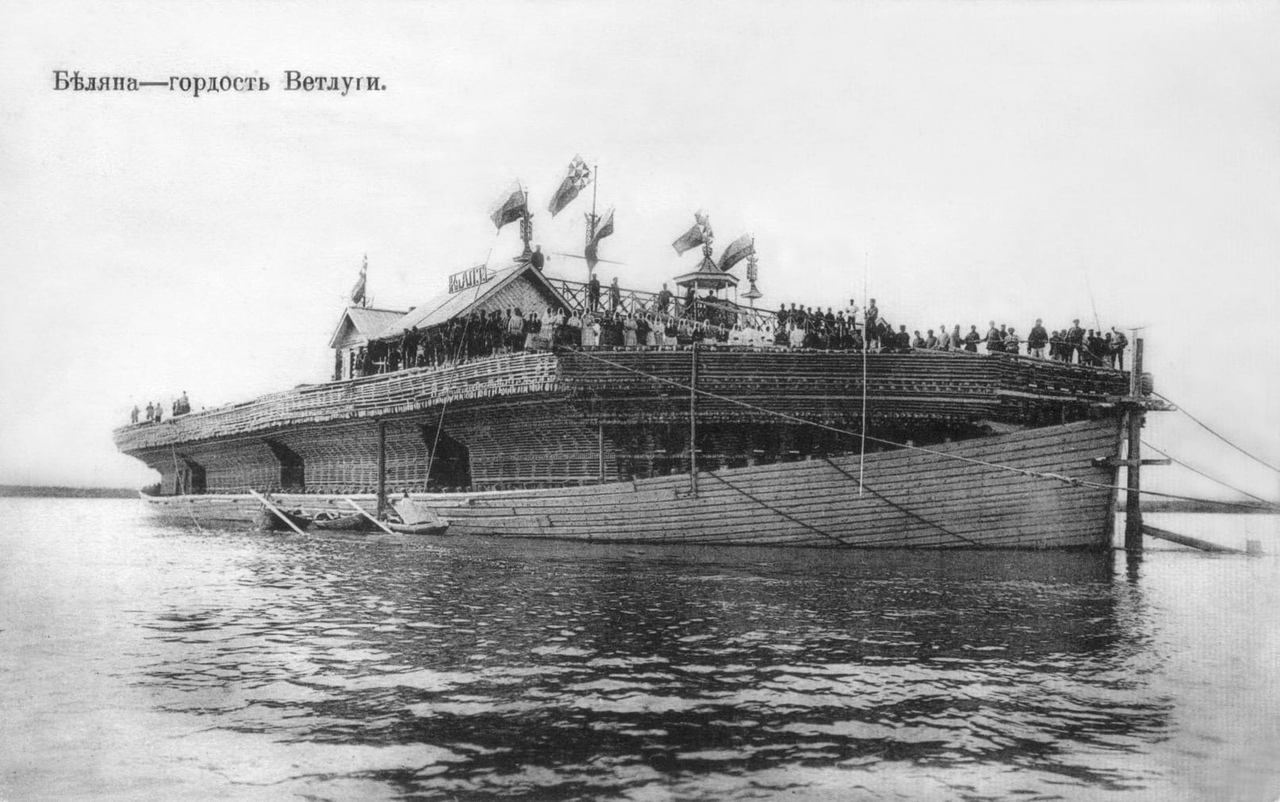
Decorated belyana with 4 spans

== In the Soviet Union ==
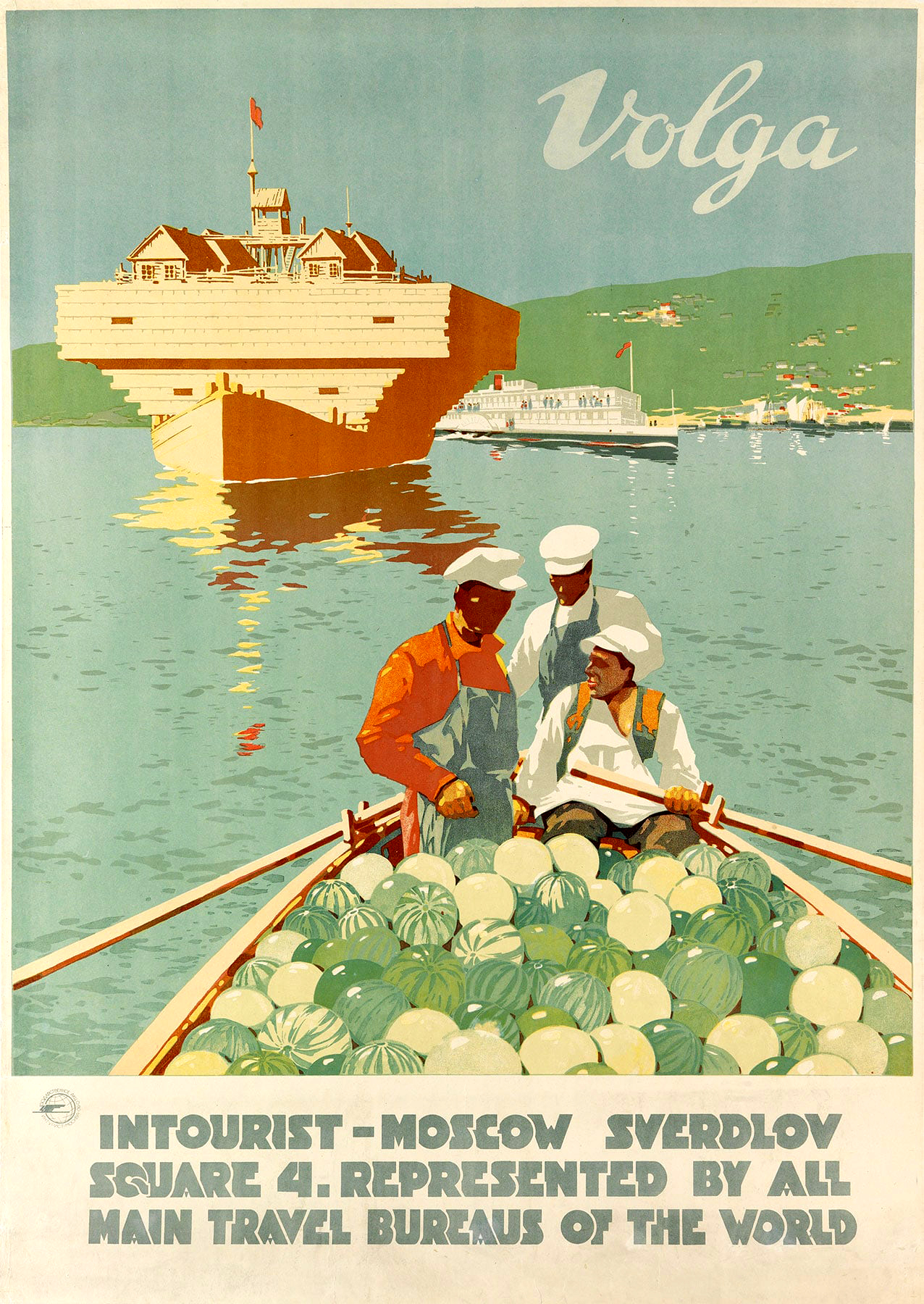
Belyana on a Soviet Intourist travel poster of the Volga region, 1932

Belyanas were used in the early years of the Soviet Union. They were built at Milutin factory, Cheboksary. The last known belyana was built in 1939, though there is anecdotal evidence that two or three belyanas were built after the Second World War and sent to Stalingrad for city rebuilding. Their usage ended because their construction was time-consuming and special skills were needed to float such unique vessels; with the development of the railway system, the cost of transportation by rail became cheaper than by water, so the use of belyanas ended for purely economic reasons.

== Archaeological finding ==
In 2015, tourists found remains of a wooden vessel in a bank of the Vetluga river. It was later determined to be a belyana that had caught fire and been abandoned by its crew. In 2016, archaeologist Yuri Philippov started to work on the site. In 2017, 28 square meters of the site was inspected and the vessel was uncovered. The finding is 80 meters long, 20 meters wide, and approximately 1.5 meters high. It is the only belyana of which remains have been found. Scientists determined the age of the vessel to be approximately 350 years.

== In art ==
- Poet Velimir Khlebnikov mentioned belyanas in his poems, for example in this unnamed one (1915):

В нашей пре заморский лен,
В наших веслах только клен.
На купеческой беляне
Браги груз несется пьяный;
И красивые невольницы
Наливают ковш повольницы.

He also wrote in a letter to his friend in 1915, that "it would be great to hold an Argonaut trip on a special belyana for a lotus from Perm to Astrakhan". (Note: "Хорошо бы летом из Перми на особой беляне устроить поход Аргонавтов за лотосом в Астрахань"; letter from Astrakhan to Petrograd, to M.V. Matushin)

- Science writer Yakov Perelman mentioned belyanas in the first edition of his book Mechanics for entertainment (1930), as an example of how such a big vessel can maneuver using a rudder and a lot, without any engine.
- Several artists created pictures of belyanas:
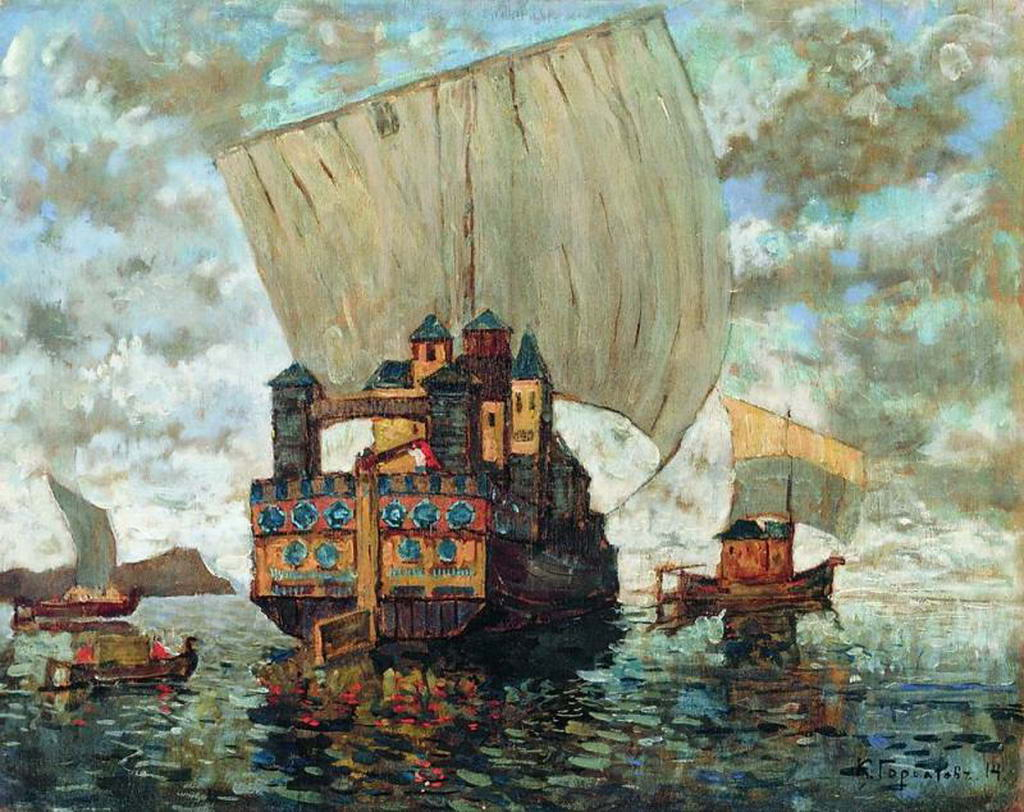
Belyanas. Painting by Konstantin Gorbatov (1914)

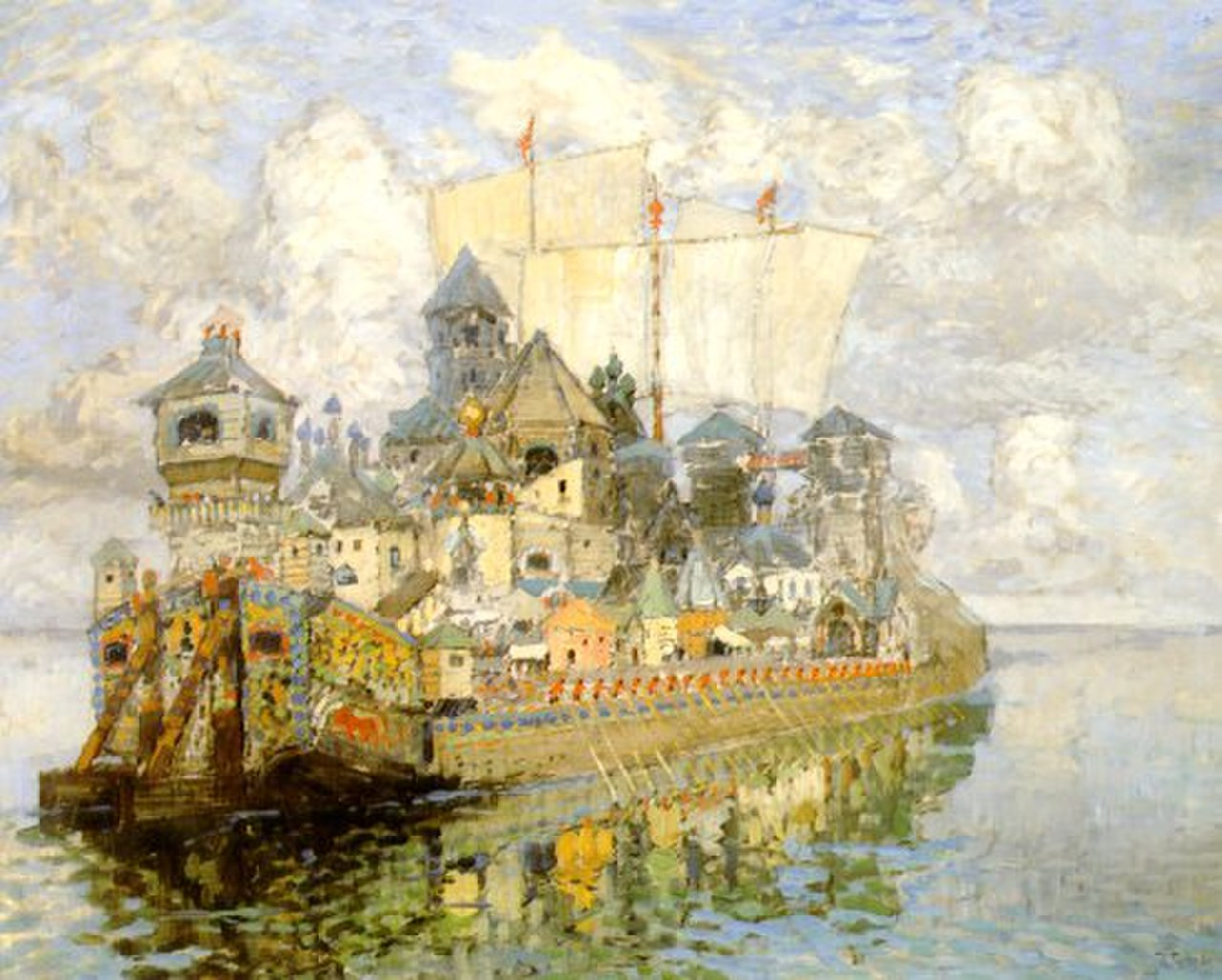
Konstantin Gorbatov painted the town of Kitezh on Belyana (1913)

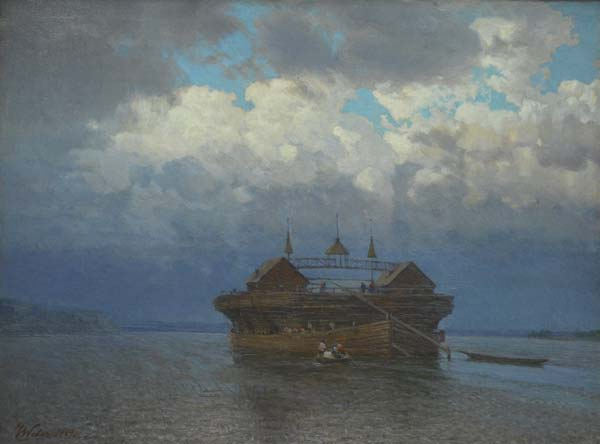
Belyana on Volga, by Y. Weber (1929)

== Sources ==
- Верховский, В.Н. (1911). Беляна [Belyana] (in Russian). Санкт-Петербург: Типография Спб. градоначальства.
- Писаревский, А. А. (1933). Белянный сплав леса: практическое руководство по постройке белян, погрузке и сплаву леса в них [Belyanny rafting of timber: a practical guide to the construction of belyany, loading and rafting of timber in them] (in Russian). Москва: Всесоюзное кооперативное объединенное издательство.
- Окороков, А.В. (2021). Традиционное судостроение как часть культурного наследия народов России. Т. 1 [Traditional shipbuilding as part of the cultural heritage of the peoples of Russia. T. 1] (PDF) (in Russian). Moscow: Институт Наследия. ISBN 978-5-86443-345-4.
- Неуструев, Семен Петрович (1914). Словарь волжских судовых терминов: объяснение современных и старинных слов, в связи с историей волжского судоходства: с рисунками в тексте [старинных и современных судов и портретом автора] [Dictionary of Volga ship terms: an explanation of modern and ancient words in connection with the history of the Volga shipping: with drawings in the text [of ancient and modern ships and a portrait of the author]]. Н. Новгород: Типо-лит. Г. Искольдского. pp. 28–32.
- Шубин, И.А. (1927). Волга и Волжское судоходство. История, развитие и современное состояние судоходства и судостроения [Volga and Volga shipping. History, development and current state of shipping and shipbuilding] (PDF). Moscow: Транспечать. pp. 210–218, 344–347.
