= Timber rafting =

Letting rafts of tree trunks float downriver

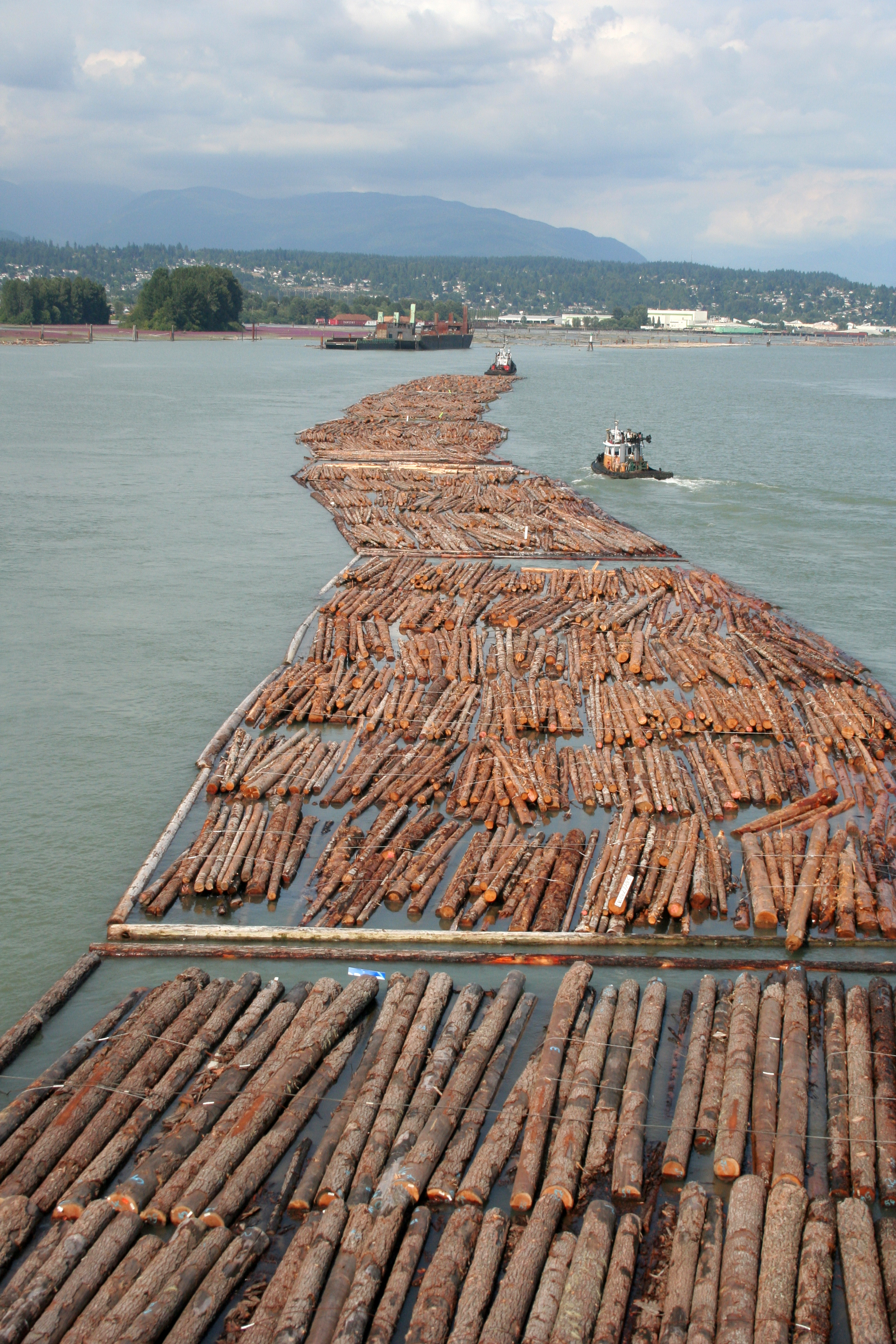
Rafting to Vancouver, British Columbia Canada (August 2006).

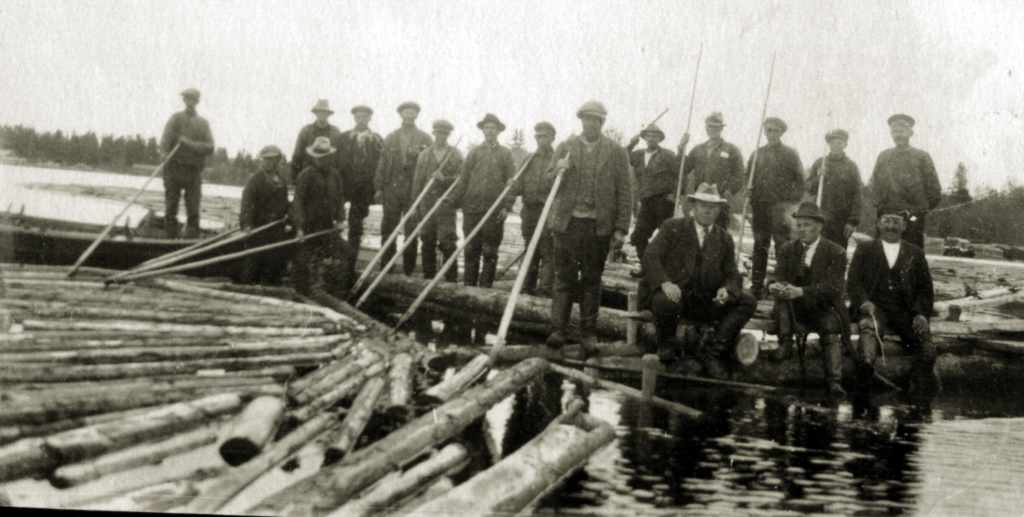
Raftsmen in Northern Finland in the 1930s

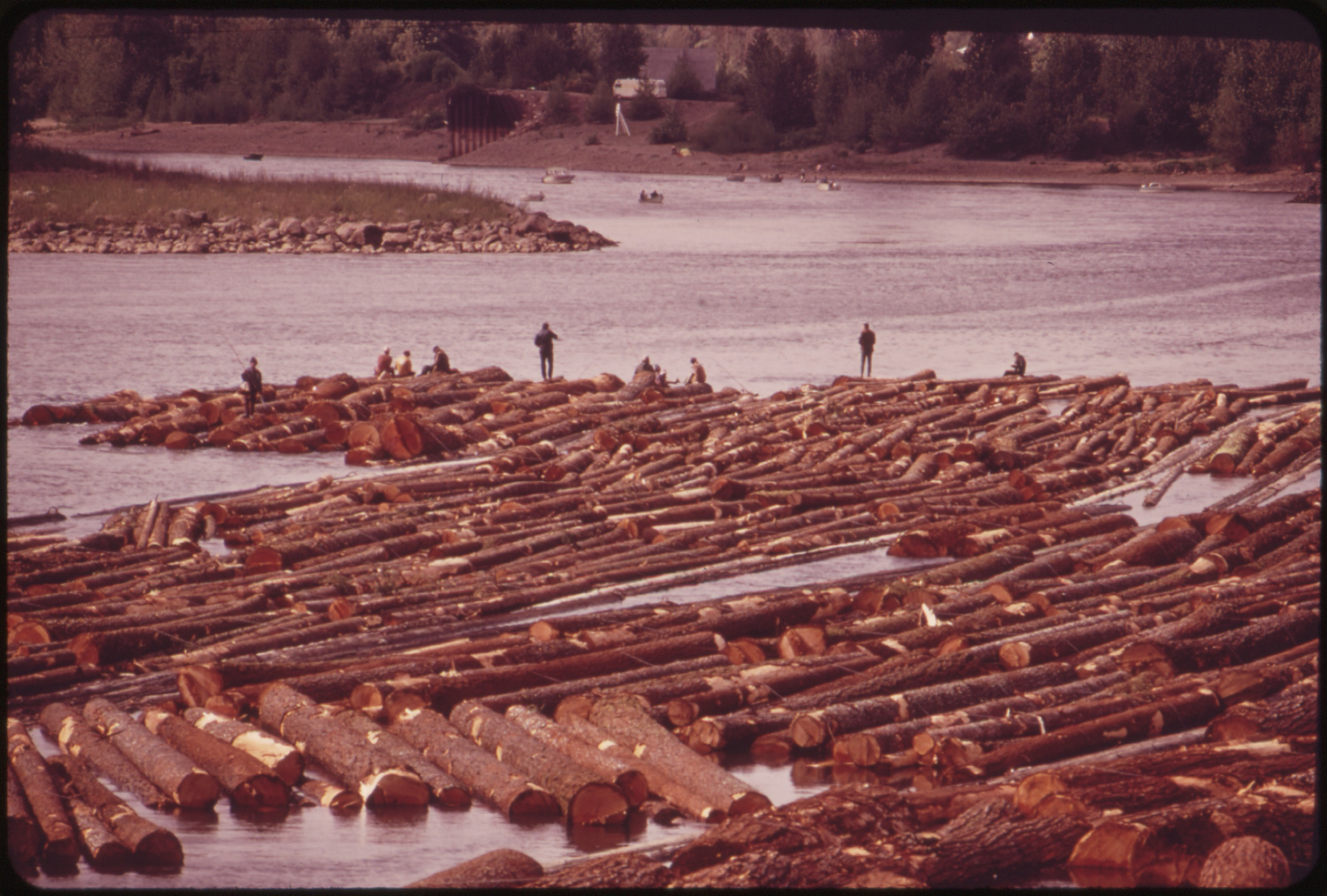
Timber rafting on the Willamette River (May 1973).

Timber rafting is a method of transporting felled tree trunks by tying them together to make rafts, which are then drifted or pulled downriver, or across a lake or other body of water. It is arguably, after log driving, the second cheapest means of transporting felled timber. Both methods may be referred to as timber floating. The tradition of timber rafting cultivated in Austria, the Czech Republic, Germany, Latvia, Poland and Spain was inscribed on UNESCO Representative List of the Intangible Cultural Heritage of Humanity in 2022.

== Historical rafting ==
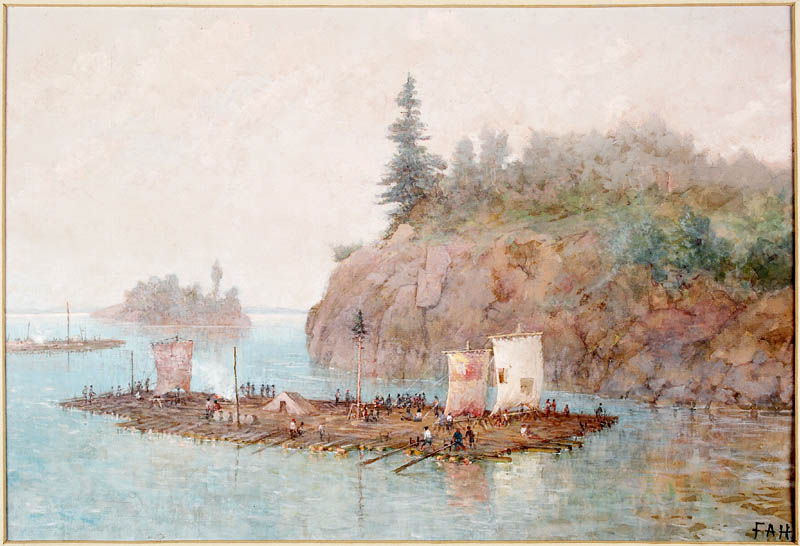
Timber raft by Frances Anne Hopkins, 1868.

Unlike log driving, which was a dangerous task of floating separate logs, floaters or raftsmen could enjoy relative comfort of navigation, with cabins built on rafts, steering by means of oars, and the possibility to make stops. On the other hand, rafting requires wider waterflows.

Timber rafts were also used as a means of transportation of people and goods, both raw (ore, fur, game) and finished.

Theophrastus (Hist. Plant. 5.8.2) records how the Romans imported Corsican timber by way of a huge raft propelled by as many as fifty masts and sails.

This practice used to be common in many parts of the world, especially North America and on all main rivers of Germany. Timber rafting allowed for connecting large continental forests, as in southwestern Germany, via Main, Neckar, Danube, and Rhine with the coastal cities and states. Early modern forestry and remote trading were closely connected. Large pines in the Black Forest were called "Holländer," as they were traded to the Netherlands. Large timber rafts on the Rhine were 200 to 400m in length and 40m wide and consisted of several thousand logs. The crew consisted of 400 to 500 men, and the rafts were provided with shelter, bakeries, ovens and livestock stables.

Timber rafting infrastructure allowed for large interconnected networks all over continental Europe. The advent of the railroad, steam-powered vessels, and improvements in trucking and road networks gradually reduced the use of timber rafts. The practice is still of importance in Finland.

In Spain, this method of transport was used mainly in the Ebro, Tajo, Júcar, Turia, and Segura rivers, and to a lesser extent in the Guadalquivir. There is documentary evidence of timber rafting as early as the sixteenth century, and its use was extended until the middle of the 20th century.

In Latvia, the most notable rafting took place on the Gauja and Daugava rivers. After fading away in the late 1960s, Gauja river rafting was revived in the town of Strenči by enthusiasts in 1996, and the first annual Gauja Rafting Festival took place in May 1998. The practice was added to the Latvian Cultural Canon non-material list in 2018.

In Russia, the use of elaborate timber rafts called belyana continued into the 1930s.

== Construction ==
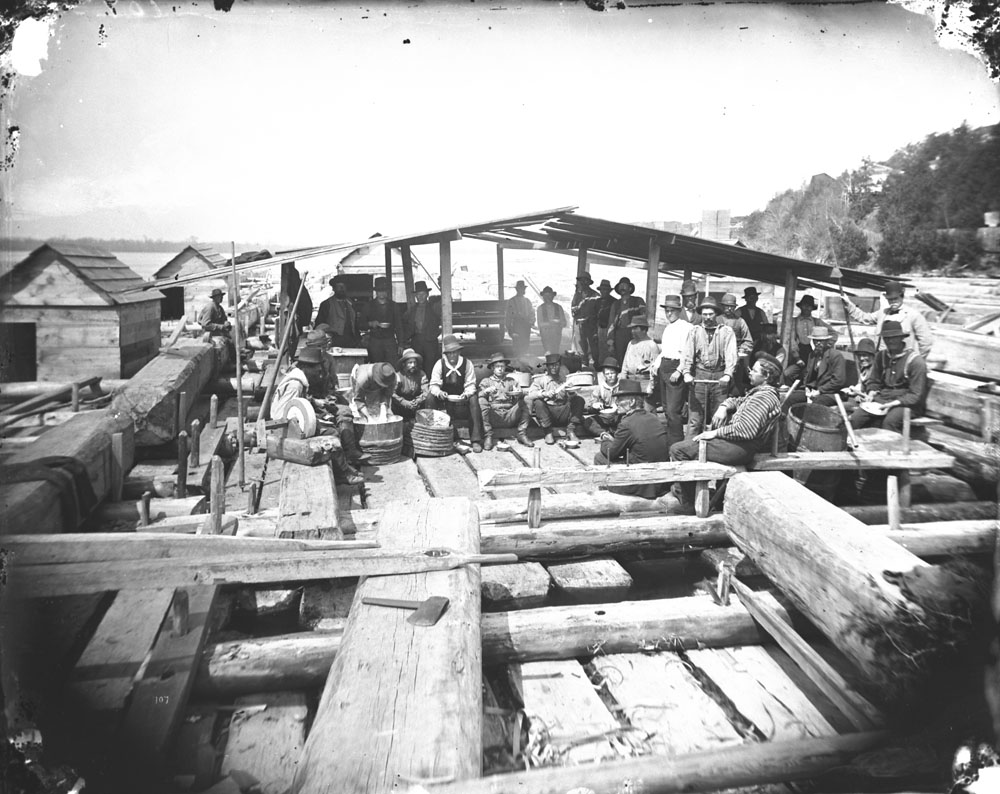
Cookery on J.R. Booth's raft, circa 1880. The raftsmen cooked, ate and slept on these rafts as they floated down the river.

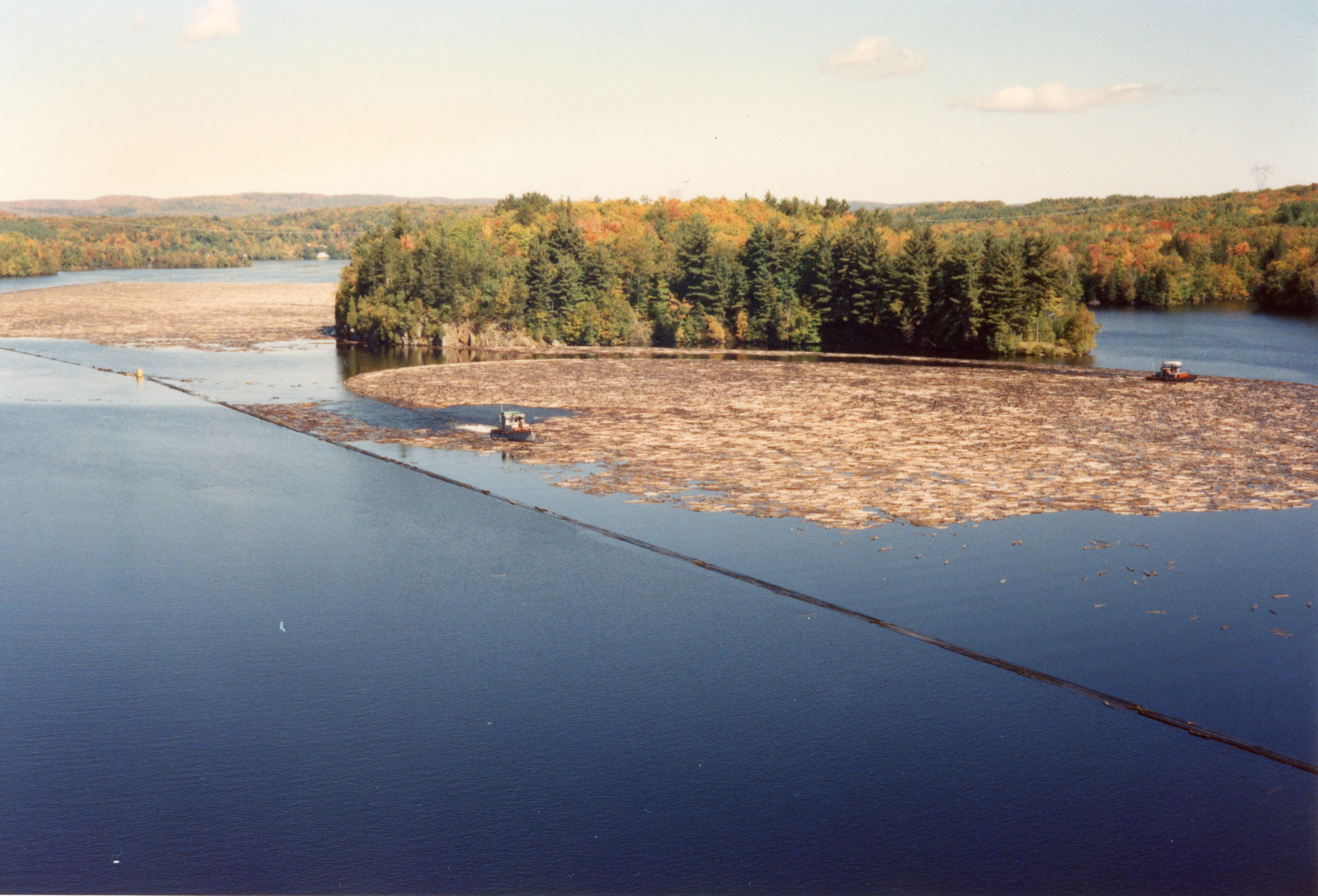
Timber rafting, Saint-Maurice River, Shawinigan, Quebec, Canada, 1994

Timber rafts could be of enormous proportions, sometimes up to 600 metres (2,000 ft) long, 50 metres (160 ft) wide, and stacked 2 metres (6 ft 7 in) high. Such rafts would contain thousands of logs. For the comfort of the raftsmen - which could number up to 500 - logs were also used to build cabins and galleys. Control of the raft was done by oars and later on by tugboats.

Raft construction differs depending on the watercourse. Rocky and windy rivers saw rafts of simple, yet sometimes smart, construction. For example, the front parts of the logs were joined by wooden bars, while the rear parts were loosely roped together. The resulting slack allowed for easy adaptation for narrow and windy waterbeds. Wide and quiet rivers, like the Mississippi River, allowed huge rafts to travel in caravans and even be chained into strings.

These types of constructed log rafts used for timber rafting over long distances by waterways to markets of large populations appeared on the Atlantic coast about 1883. They were there sometimes referred to as Joggins-Leary log ships because they were financed by businessman James T. Leary and originated at Joggins, Nova Scotia. They seem also to have been employed on the Rhine River as early as September 14, 1888. Their use on the Pacific coast was first contemplated by the capitalists James Mervyn Donahue of the San Francisco and North Pacific Railroad and John D. Spreckels of the San Diego and Arizona Railway when they formed the Pacific west coast Joggins Raft Company on September 21, 1889.

== In the southeastern United States ==
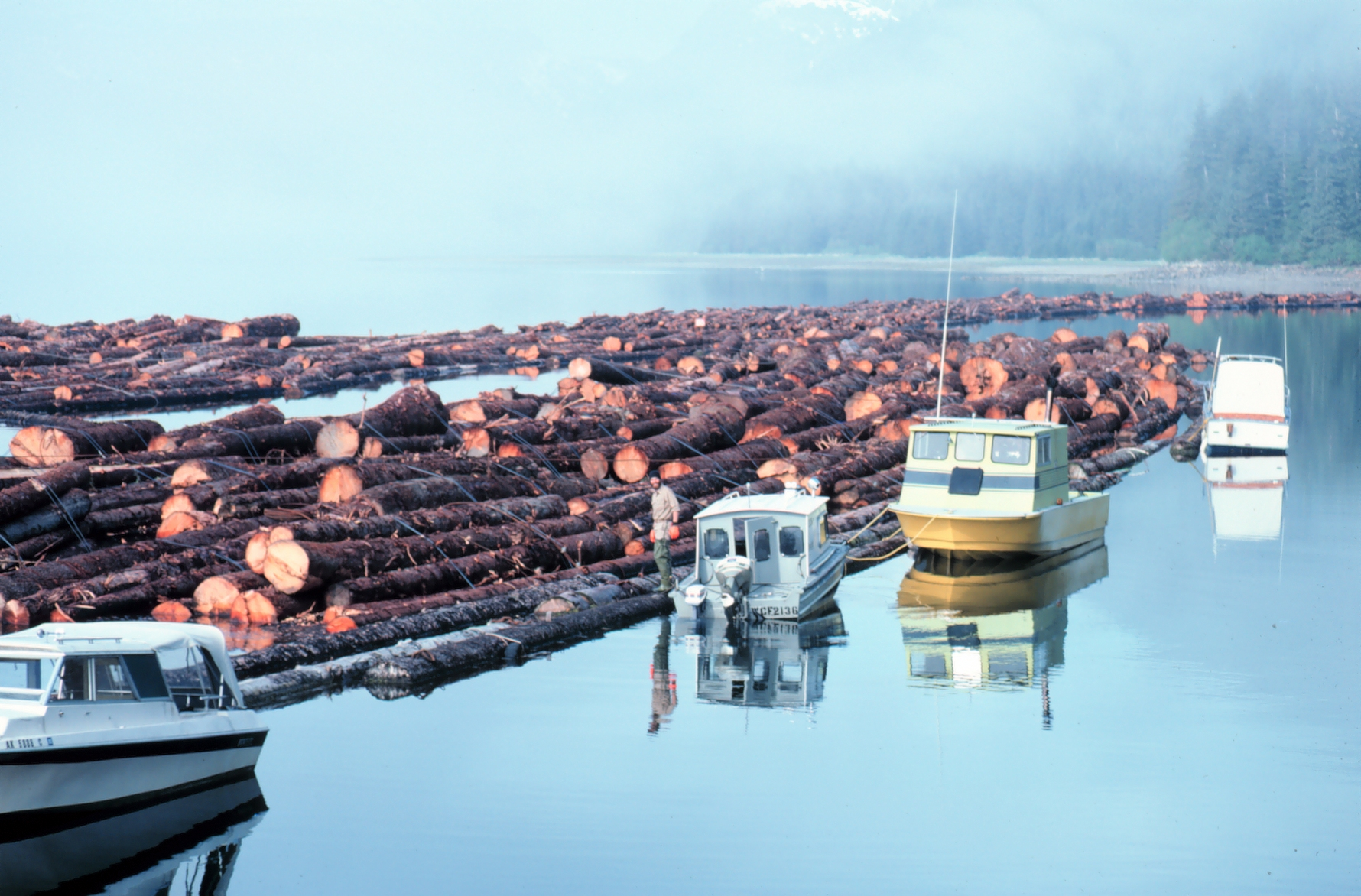
Logs rafted for towing in Alaska (May 1981)

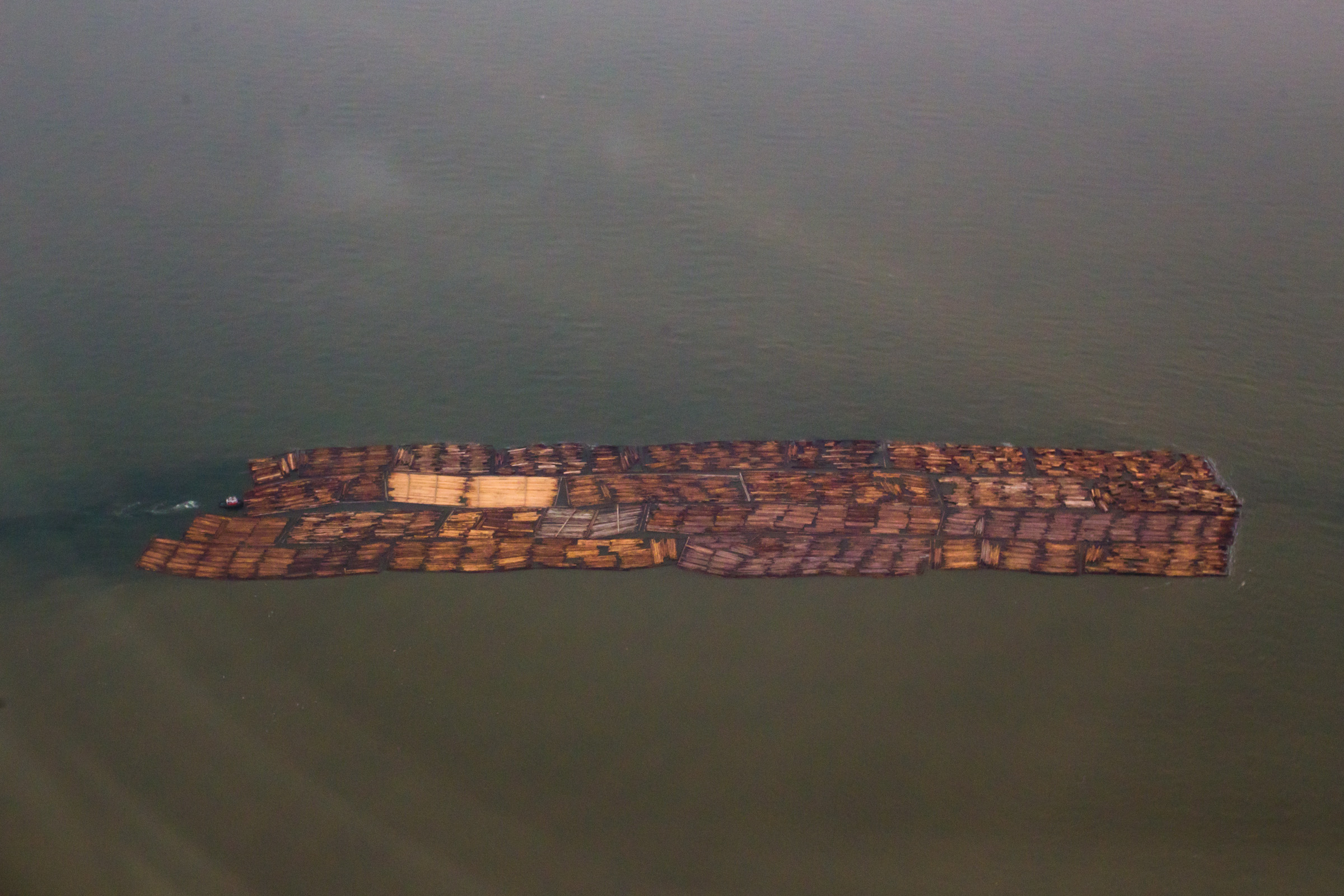
Tug boat pushing a log raft near Vancouver Canada (May 2012)

Rafting was a principal method of transporting timber in the southeastern United States but, except on the Mississippi River, rafts were necessarily smaller than those described above. On Georgia's Altamaha River, for example, the maximum width was about forty feet (12 m), that being the widest that could pass between the pilings of railroad bridges. Maximum length was about 250 feet (76 m), that being the longest that could navigate The Narrows, several miles of the river that were not only very narrow but also very crooked. Each raft had two oars forty to fifty feet long, one in the bow, the other at the stern. The oars were for steering, not propelling, the raft. The minimum raft crew was two men, the pilot who usually manned the stern oar, and his bow hand. Rafts usually had a lean-to shack for shelter and a mound of dirt for a hearth to warm by and cook on. The timber rafts on the Altamaha delivered logs to the port of Brunswick, Georgia, where they were loaded onto timber schooners and transported to international markets like Liverpool, Rio de Janeiro, and Havana. Rivermen assigned colorful names to the various features and hazards along their route down the Atamaha. Among the many "riverman monikers" was Old Hell Bight, where the river marks the border between Long County to the north and Wayne County to the south, and is a particularly troublesome bend, with associated dangerous currents, where a pilot and crew might lose "their wages, their timber, and occasionally their lives"

Most rafts were sharp-chute, that is, V-bowed, rather than square-bowed. Raftsmen had learned that with a V-bow a raft was more likely to hold together and glance off if it drifted out of control and hit the river bank. As one old-time raftsman put it: “With a square bow you were compelled to hold the raft in or near the middle of the river: if it butted the hill it would come to pieces. The sharp-chute could be put together so it would not come apart. And it saved a lot of hard work. Raftsmen didn't mind letting it go to the hill. They’d say: ‘Let’er shoot out.’”

Rafts were assembled in sections. Each section was made up of round or squared timbers, all of the same length except for the outside, or “boom logs,” which extended aft a few feet to enclose the following section. Thus the sections were coupled together. A fairly typical raft would be one of three, four or five sections, each section having timbers twenty to thirty feet in length.

Most rafts were made up of squared timbers, either hewn square by hand or sawn square by upcountry sawmills. Some timbers were carefully, smoothly hewn, and there was a demand for them, especially in England, after steam sawmilling became common. On the Altamaha, for many years during the rafting era, most rafts were made up of “scab” timber, that is, logs roughly squared by broad ax for tighter assembly and for gang sawmills which could cut flat-face timber only.

Although, on the Altamaha, there was rafting to some extent before the Civil War and after World War I, the Altamaha's rafting era is generally considered to have been the years between those wars. During those years, Darien, a town at the mouth of the river with a population of perhaps a couple of thousand, was a major international timber port. Reports of exports from Darien were included in the New York Lumber Trade Journal along with reports of exports from such large ports as New Orleans, Mobile, Jacksonville, Savannah, Charleston, and Norfolk.

== In Quebec ==
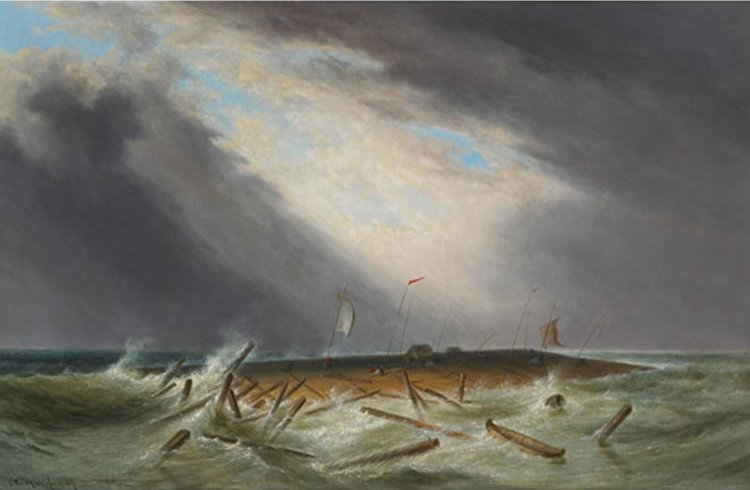
Lumber Raft on S. Lawrence river, oil 1867, Cornelius Krieghoff (1815–1872)

In Quebec, timber was transported by floating downcurrent on the province's rivers, which required the work of cages and log drivers. The first types of trees cut were Pinus strobus and Eastern white pines, to be shipped to Great Britain. The rivers involved in this process included the St. Lawrence, St-Maurice, Batiscan, Saguenay, Jacques-Cartier, and Sainte-Anne (Les Chenaux) rivers.

- A cageux was responsible for assembling the rafts and piloting a huge wooden train made of squared pine, also called a cage, to a port of embarkation.
- A log driver was responsible for controlling free-floating cut tree trunks that were thrown into a watercourse in order to reach sawmills or pulp and paper mills.

== In Finland ==
While the more technically challenging log driving down rivers declined from the 1960s and mostly ended by the early 21st century, timber rafting has continued to some degree along lakes. UPM and Metsähallitus continue timber rafting in the Vuoksi-Saimaa basin. Timber rafting has experienced a resurgence following the Russian invasion of Ukraine. Timber imports from Russia stopped, requiring their replacement with more timber to be procured from the upper reaches of Saimaa, while the Finnish truck fleet was however not large enough to accommodate this. Thus, timber rafting took its place. Timber rafting is 20% cheaper than transport by truck or rail. It is also environmentally friendly, with much lower greenhouse gas emissions than truck transport.

== See also ==
- Barrier Boat
- Belyana
- Benson raft
- Kallai
- Log boom
- Log driving
- Log flume
- Timber slide
- Wood economy
- Eight Hundred Leagues on the Amazon, novel by Jules Verne about a timber raft trip down the Amazon River.
