= Columbus (1824 ship) =

Disposable ship

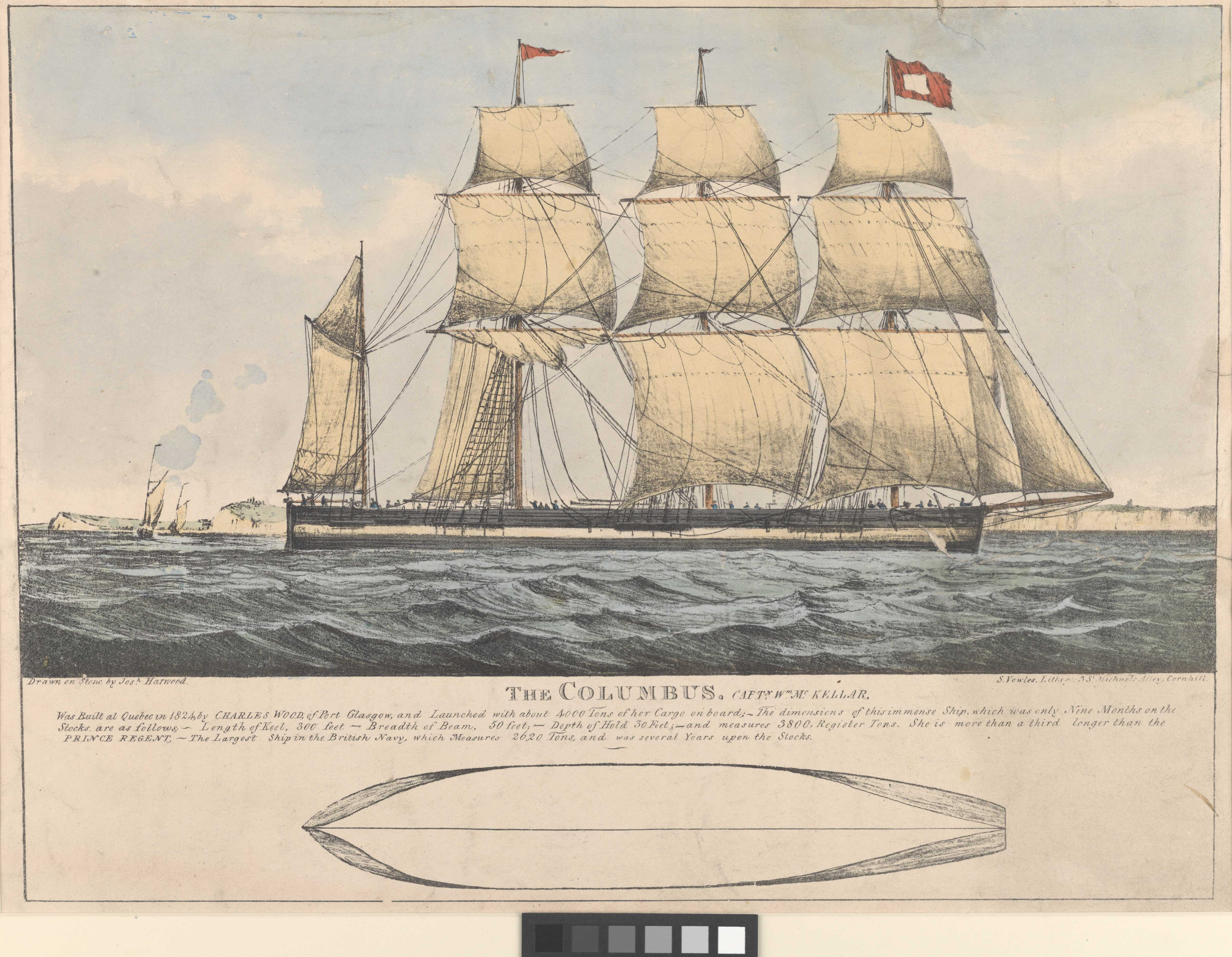
- A contemporary depiction of the Columbus in full sail

History

United Kingdom
- Name: Columbus
- Builder: Charles Wood, Anse-du-Fort, Quebec, Canada
- Launched: 28 July 1824
- Fate: Wrecked 17 May 1825

General characteristics
- Class & type: Disposable ship
- Tonnage: 3,690 GRT
- Length: 301 ft (92 m)
- Beam: 50 ft 6 in (15.39 m)
- Draught: 22 feet 5 inches (6.83 m)
- Sail plan: Four-masted barque
- Complement: 74

The Columbus was a disposable ship built in 1824 to transport timber from British North America to the United Kingdom. She was intended to be dismantled upon arrival and her considerable structure sold, thus avoiding an import duty on timber cargoes. Columbus was ten times the size of traditional timber-carrying cargo vessels and was built for economy, not speed. She made one successful voyage from Quebec to London carrying a cargo of 7,875 long tons (8,001 t) and became a spectacle for tourists in her dock at Blackwall, London. Instead of dismantling it was decided by her owners that the Columbus would return to North America in 1825 to deliver a second load. She hit a storm in the Atlantic and was sunk, her crew being rescued by a passing merchant vessel. A second disposable ship, the Baron of Renfrew, was launched in 1825. Declining freight transport costs, reduced timber prices and a reduction in timber duty thereafter made this method of transport uneconomic and no more disposable ships were built for the Atlantic timber trade.

== Construction ==
In the 1820s Britain maintained an import duty on timber. There was, however, no duty payable on ships broken up and sold. To take advantage of this a merchant decided to construct a large timber vessel as a disposable ship, to be sailed from British North America to Britain where she would be dismantled and sold. The ship would also carry a cargo of loose timber and be built not for speed but to carry the greatest cargo at the lowest cost.

The Columbus was built by Charles Wood at Anse-du-Fort on the Île d'Orléans, Quebec, to fulfil this need. She measured 301 feet (92 m) in length, 50 feet 6 inches (15.39 m) in breadth and 22 feet 5 inches (6.83 m) in depth and was of 3,690 Gross Rated Tonnage. She was flat-bottomed and with straight sides made of square timber to maximise her cargo space and ease of reselling her structure as timber. It had originally been planned to equip the Columbus with two steam engines but she was equipped barque-style with three square-rigged masts and a jiggermast.

Columbus was around ten times the size of usual timber-carrying vessels of the period. It was originally planned that she would carry 15,000 long tons (15,240 t) of timber loose in her shell-like hull; but actually carried 6,300–7,875 long tons (6,401–8,001 t). Such a cargo would normally have required 30 cargo ships of around 560 tons displacement.

== Maiden voyage ==
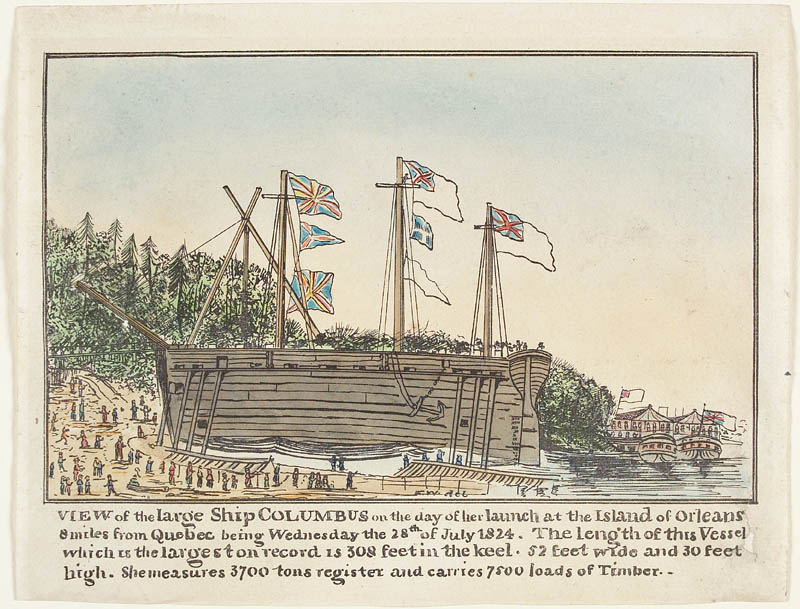
A contemporary depiction of Columbus' launch

The Columbus was launched on 28 July 1824. She was loaded with timber and departed on her maiden voyage on 5 September, under Captain William McKeller. Columbus was grounded at Bersimis on the St Lawrence River on 9 September but was refloated and continued her journey three days later. By 29 October she was off the Scilly Islands and arrived at The Downs on 1 November. She became the largest vessel at that time to have crossed the Atlantic Ocean.

Columbus was leaking by the end of her journey and was brought in under a pilot and steam tugs to Blackwall, London. Her size drew sightseers to the dockyard.

== Shipwreck ==
Instead of dismantling it was decided to send Columbus back to North America for a second load of timber, against the advice of Captain Wood. Under Captain Daniel Nesbitt Munro, and with a 73-man crew, the vessel left The Downs on 26 April 1825. She was loaded only with ballast and was bound for Saint John, New Brunswick. On 17 May at 46°54′N 29°2′W Columbus encountered a storm with strong west-north-westerly winds, causing her to roll and become unmanageable. The storm caused her timbers to open and take on water at the rate of 2 feet (60 cm) per hour. Despite all hands manning the pumps and her steam engine pumping out 1,400 imperial gallons (6,400 L) of water per minute the flooding could not be brought under control.

The crew sighted the merchant vessel Dolphin, the first vessel they had seen since leaving British waters, and signalled her for assistance. The Dolphin stood nearby for eight hours, while efforts continued to save the Columbus. When a severe roll put the steam engine out of action Munro decided he had no alternative and ordered his crew to abandon ship. The first boat lowered was smashed by contact with Columbus' hull but the crew escaped in the last two boats.

The crew of the Columbus were taken aboard the Dolphin. However the Dolphin carried only a modest quantity of water and food for her 13-man crew and it was clear that they had insufficient supplies to make it to her destination, which was also St John. It was decided to return to England but southerly winds prevented her from making for the port at Falmouth. She waited for the weather to change for some days before rations (of 1 imperial pint (570 ml) of water per man per day and 1/3 pound (150 g) of pork, plus some biscuits) ran low. She made for Cork, Ireland, and was within three days of running out of provisions when she landed on 24 May.

== Legacy ==
The Columbus was followed by a similar vessel, the 5,294-ton Baron of Renfrew launched in 1825, which sank en route to Britain. Shortly afterwards, declining freight transport costs reduced timber prices, and a reduction in timber duty made the method uneconomic and no more disposable timber ships were built for the Atlantic trade.
