= Administrative divisions of Yaroslavl Oblast =

Yaroslavl Oblast Russia
- Administrative center: Yaroslavl

Administrative structure (as of 2012)
- Districts: 17
- Cities/towns: 11
- Urban-type settlements: 12
- Selsovets: 224

Municipal structure (as of 2002)
- Rural settlements: 6,024 (inhabited); 1,029 (uninhabited)

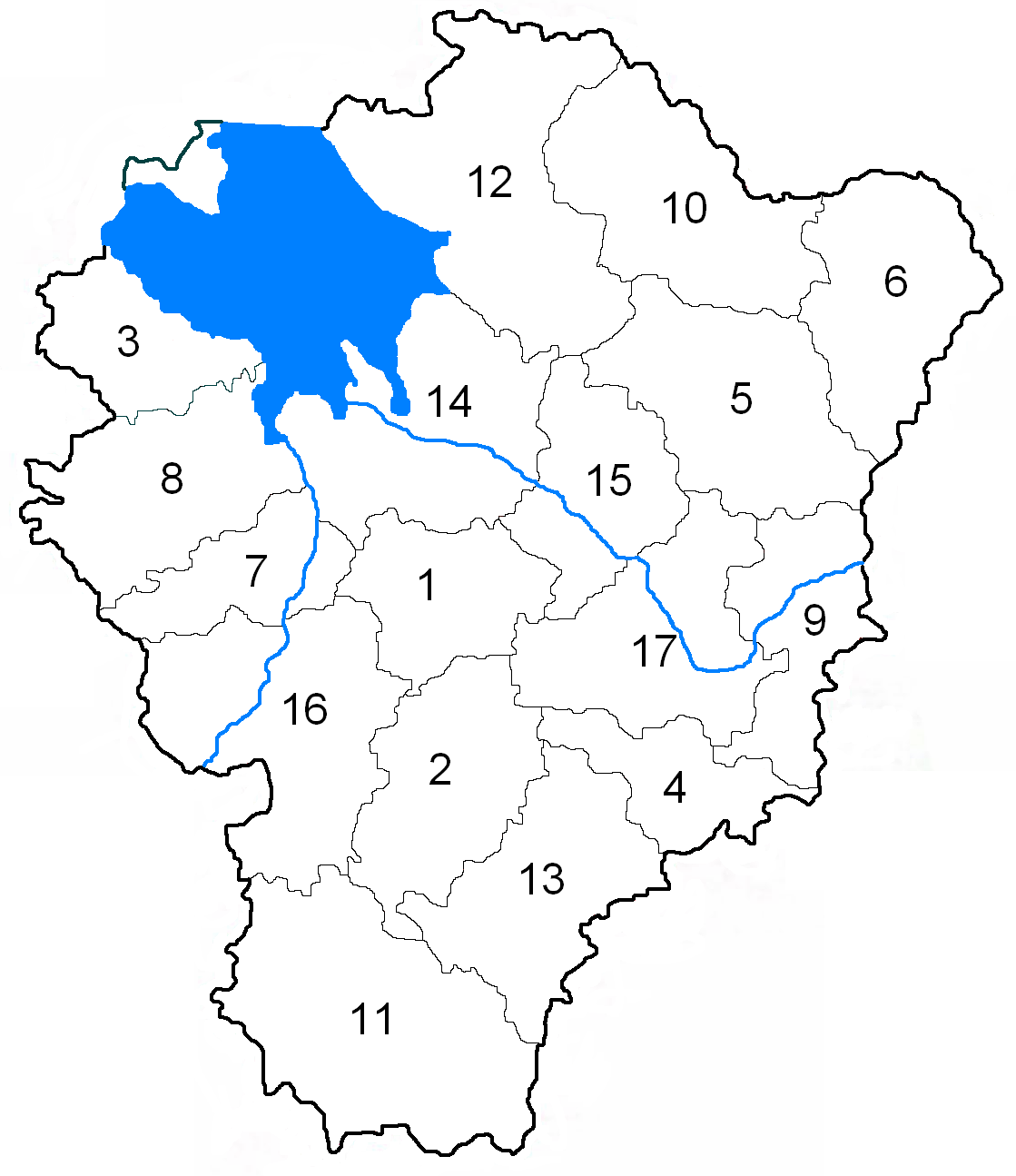
Map of the Yaroslavl Oblast (with numbered)

Yaroslavl Oblast is a federal subject of Russia.

== Administrative and municipal divisions ==
- Cities and towns under the oblast's jurisdiction:
  - Yaroslavl (Ярославль) (administrative center)
    - city districts:
      - Dzerzhinsky (Дзержинский)
      - Frunzensky (Фрунзенский)
      - Kirovsky (Кировский)
      - Krasnoperekopsky (Красноперекопский)
      - Leninsky (Ленинский)
      - Zavolzhsky (Заволжский)
  - Pereslavl-Zalessky (Переславль-Залесский)
  - Rostov (Ростов)
  - Rybinsk (Рыбинск)
  - Tutayev (Тутаев)
  - Uglich (Углич)
- Districts:
  - Bolsheselsky (Большесельский)
    - with 7 rural okrugs under the district's jurisdiction.
  - Borisoglebsky (Борисоглебский)
    - Urban-type settlements under the district's jurisdiction:
      - Borisoglebsky (Борисоглебский)
    - with 12 rural okrugs under the district's jurisdiction.
  - Breytovsky (Брейтовский)
    - with 8 rural okrugs under the district's jurisdiction.
  - Danilovsky (Даниловский)
    - Towns under the district's jurisdiction:
      - Danilov (Данилов)
    - with 19 rural okrugs under the district's jurisdiction.
  - Gavrilov-Yamsky (Гаврилов-Ямский)
    - Towns under the district's jurisdiction:
      - Gavrilov-Yam (Гаврилов-Ям)
    - with 9 rural okrugs under the district's jurisdiction.
  - Lyubimsky (Любимский)
    - Towns under the district's jurisdiction:
      - Lyubim (Любим)
    - with 8 rural okrugs under the district's jurisdiction.
  - Myshkinsky (Мышкинский)
    - Towns under the district's jurisdiction:
      - Myshkin (Мышкин)
    - with 10 rural okrugs under the district's jurisdiction.
  - Nekouzsky (Некоузский)
    - with 11 rural okrugs under the district's jurisdiction.
  - Nekrasovsky (Некрасовский)
    - Urban-type settlements under the district's jurisdiction:
      - Burmakino (Бурмакино)
      - Krasny Profintern (Красный Профинтерн)
      - Nekrasovskoye (Некрасовское)
    - with 14 rural okrugs under the district's jurisdiction.
  - Pereslavsky (Переславский)
    - with 21 rural okrugs under the district's jurisdiction.
  - Pervomaysky (Первомайский)
    - Urban-type settlements under the district's jurisdiction:
      - Prechistoye (Пречистое)
    - with 10 rural okrugs under the district's jurisdiction.
  - Poshekhonsky (Пошехонский)
    - Towns under the district's jurisdiction:
      - Poshekhonye (Пошехонье)
    - with 18 rural okrugs under the district's jurisdiction.
  - Rostovsky (Ростовский)
    - Urban-type settlements under the district's jurisdiction:
      - Ishnya (Ишня)
      - Petrovskoye (Петровское)
      - Porechye-Rybnoye (Поречье-Рыбное)
      - Semibratovo (Семибратово)
    - with 15 rural okrugs under the district's jurisdiction.
  - Rybinsky (Рыбинский)
    - Urban-type settlements under the district's jurisdiction:
      - Pesochnoye (Песочное)
    - with 16 rural okrugs under the district's jurisdiction.
  - Tutayevsky (Тутаевский)
    - Urban-type settlements under the district's jurisdiction:
      - Konstantinovsky (Константиновский)
    - with 10 rural okrugs under the district's jurisdiction.
  - Uglichsky (Угличский)
    - with 17 rural okrugs under the district's jurisdiction.
  - Yaroslavsky (Ярославский)
    - Urban-type settlements under the district's jurisdiction:
      - Krasnye Tkachi (Красные Ткачи)
      - Lesnaya Polyana (Лесная Поляна)
    - with 19 rural okrugs under the district's jurisdiction.
