= Filimonovo =

Filimonovo (Russian: Филимоново) is the name of several rural localities in Russia:

- Filimonovo, Arkhangelsk Oblast, a village in Ilyinsky Selsoviet of Vilegodsky District of Arkhangelsk Oblast
- Filimonovo, Chelyabinsk Oblast, a selo in Filimonovsky Selsoviet of Chebarkulsky District of Chelyabinsk Oblast
- Filimonovo, Kostroma Oblast, a village in Sudayskoye Settlement of Chukhlomsky District of Kostroma Oblast
- Filimonovo, Krasnoyarsk Krai, a selo in Filimonovsky Selsoviet of Kansky District of Krasnoyarsk Krai
- Filimonovo, Kostinskoye Rural Settlement, Dmitrovsky District, Moscow Oblast, a village in Kostinskoye Rural Settlement of Dmitrovsky District of Moscow Oblast
- Filimonovo, Yakhroma, Dmitrovsky District, Moscow Oblast, a village under the administrative jurisdiction of the Town of Yakhroma in Dmitrovsky District of Moscow Oblast
- Filimonovo, Sergiyevo-Posadsky District, Moscow Oblast, a village under the administrative jurisdiction of the Town of Khotkovo in Sergiyevo-Posadsky District of Moscow Oblast
- Filimonovo, Ryazan Oblast, a village in Alyutovsky Rural Okrug of Pronsky District of Ryazan Oblast
- Filimonovo, Smolensk Oblast, a village in Shapovskoye Rural Settlement of Demidovsky District of Smolensk Oblast
- Filimonovo, Tula Oblast, a village in Apukhtinskaya Rural Administration of Odoyevsky District of Tula Oblast
- Filimonovo, Bologovsky District, Tver Oblast, a village in Berezoryadskoye Rural Settlement of Bologovsky District of Tver Oblast
- Filimonovo, Konakovsky District, Tver Oblast, a village in Selikhovskoye Rural Settlement of Konakovsky District of Tver Oblast
- Filimonovo, Udmurt Republic, a village in Pyshketsky Selsoviet of Yukamensky District of the Udmurt Republic
- Filimonovo, Vladimir Oblast, a village in Petushinsky District of Vladimir Oblast
- Filimonovo, Cherepovetsky District, Vologda Oblast, a village in Myaksinsky Selsoviet of Cherepovetsky District of Vologda Oblast
- Filimonovo, Kirillovsky District, Vologda Oblast, a village in Volokoslavinsky Selsoviet of Kirillovsky District of Vologda Oblast
- Filimonovo, Vashkinsky District, Vologda Oblast, a village in Andreyevsky Selsoviet of Vashkinsky District of Vologda Oblast
- Filimonovo, Filimonovsky Rural Okrug, Breytovsky District, Yaroslavl Oblast, a village in Filimonovsky Rural Okrug of Breytovsky District of Yaroslavl Oblast
- Filimonovo, Sevastyantsevsky Rural Okrug, Breytovsky District, Yaroslavl Oblast, a village in Sevastyantsevsky Rural Okrug of Breytovsky District of Yaroslavl Oblast
- Filimonovo, Pereslavsky District, Yaroslavl Oblast, a selo in Dubrovitsky Rural Okrug of Pereslavsky District of Yaroslavl Oblast
- Filimonovo, Fatyanovsky Rural Okrug, Rostovsky District, Yaroslavl Oblast, a selo in Fatyanovsky Rural Okrug of Rostovsky District of Yaroslavl Oblast
- Filimonovo, Nikolsky Rural Okrug, Rostovsky District, Yaroslavl Oblast, a village in Nikolsky Rural Okrug of Rostovsky District of Yaroslavl Oblast
- Filimonovo, Porechye-Rybnoye, Rostovsky District, Yaroslavl Oblast, a selo under the administrative jurisdiction of the work settlement of Porechye-Rybnoye in Rostovsky District of Yaroslavl Oblast
- Filimonovo, Tutayevsky District, Yaroslavl Oblast, a village in Chebakovsky Rural Okrug of Tutayevsky District of Yaroslavl Oblast
