= Flag of Yaroslavl Oblast =

- Use: Banner
- Proportion: 2:3
- Adopted: 27 February 2001
- Design: A field of gold, charged with a bear rampant holding a halberd on its left shoulder

The flag of Yaroslavl Oblast, a federal subject of Russia, was adopted on 27 February 2001. The flag is a field of gold, charged with a bear rampant holding a halberd on its left shoulder. The ratio of the flag is 2:3.

== Other flags ==
Flag	Date	Use	Description
	1996–Present	Flag of Yaroslavl city	Blue background with the emblem on the middle.
	?–Present	Flag of Pereslavl-Zalessky	
	?–Present	Flag of Rostov	
	?–Present	Flag of Rybinsk	
	?–Present	Flag of Tutayev	Blue background with the emblem on the middle.
	?–Present	Flag of Uglich	
	2009–Present	Flag of Bolsheselsky District	
	?–2009	Flag of Bolsheselsky District	
	?–Present	Flag of Borisoglebsky District	
	?–Present	Flag of Danilovsky District	
	?–Present	Flag of Gavrilov-Yamsky District	
	2011–Present	Flag of Lyubimsky District	
	?–2011	Flag of Lyubimsky District	
	?–Present	Flag of Myshkinsky District	
	?–Present	Flag of Nekouzsky District	Blue background with the emblem on the middle.
	?–Present	Flag of Nekrasovsky District	
	?–Present	Flag of Pereslavsky District	
	?–Present	Flag of Pervomaysky District	
	?–Present	Flag of Pervomaysky District, back side	
	?–Present	Flag of Poshekhonsky District	Green background with the emblem on the middle.
	?–Present	Flag of Rostovsky District	
	?–Present	Flag of Rybinsky District	
	?–Present	Flag of Uglichsky District	
	?–Present	Flag of Yaroslavsky District	
