= Stepanchikovo =

Stepanchikovo (Russian: Степанчиково) is the name of several rural localities in Russia:

- Stepanchikovo, Moscow Oblast, a village under the administrative jurisdiction of Domodedovo Town Under Oblast Jurisdiction in Moscow Oblast; 55°22′N 37°52′E
- Stepanchikovo, Gavrilov-Yamsky District, Yaroslavl Oblast, a village in Ilyinsky Rural Okrug of Gavrilov-Yamsky District in Yaroslavl Oblast
- Stepanchikovo, Nekrasovsky District, Yaroslavl Oblast, a village in Lapinsky Rural Okrug of Nekrasovsky District in Yaroslavl Oblast
