= Kabansky =

Kabansky (masculine), Kabanskaya (feminine), or Kabanskoye (neuter) may refer to:

- Kabansky District, a district of the Buryat Republic, Russia
- Kabansky (rural locality) (Kabanskaya, Kabanskoye), name of several rural localities in Russia
