= Pereslavsky =

Pereslavsky (masculine), Pereslavskaya (feminine), or Pereslavskoye (neuter) may refer to:

- Pereslavsky District, a district of Yaroslavl Oblast, Russia
- Pereslavskoye, a rural locality (a settlement) in Kaliningrad Oblast, Russia
