= Krasny Profintern =

Krasny Profintern Красный Профинтерн
- Urban-type settlement
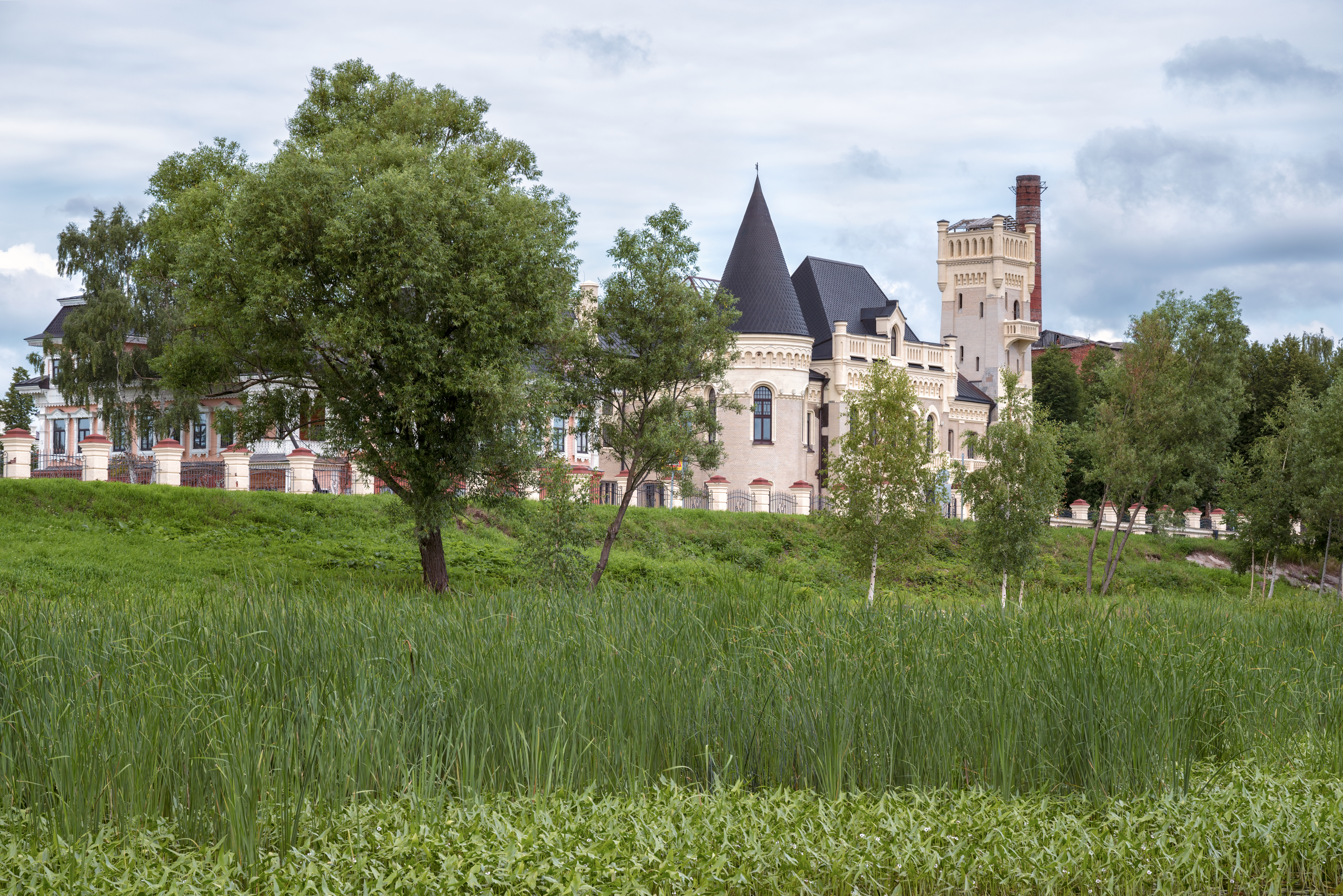
- The Ponizovkin's Palace in Krasny Profintern settlement.
- Interactive map of Krasny Profintern
- Location of Krasny Profintern Krasny Profintern (Yaroslavl Oblast)
- Coordinates: 57.7462°N 40.4366°E
- Country: Russia
- Federal subject: Yaroslavl Oblast
- Administrative district: Nekrasovsky District

Population (2010 Census)
  - Total: 1,256
  - Estimate (1 January 2018): 1,049 (−16.5%)
- Time zone: UTC+3 (MSK)
- Postal code: 152280
- OKTMO ID: 78626444051

Krasny Profintern (Russian: Кра́сный Профинте́рн) is an urban locality (an urban-type settlement) in Nekrasovsky District of Yaroslavl Oblast, Russia. Population: 1,256 (2010 census); 1,499 (2002 census); 1,922 (1989 Soviet census).
