= Konstantinovsky, Yaroslavl Oblast =

Konstantinovsky Константиновский
- Urban-type settlement
- Interactive map of Konstantinovsky
- Location of Konstantinovsky Konstantinovsky (Yaroslavl Oblast)
- Coordinates: 57.8312°N 39.5918°E
- Country: Russia
- Federal subject: Yaroslavl Oblast
- Administrative district: Tutayevsky District

Population (2010 Census)
  - Total: 5,613
  - Estimate (1 January 2018): 5,521 (−1.6%)
- Time zone: UTC+3 (MSK)
- Postal code: 152321
- OKTMO ID: 78643420051

Konstantinovsky (Russian: Константи́новский) is an urban locality (an urban-type settlement) in Tutayevsky District of Yaroslavl Oblast, Russia. Population: 5,613 (2010 census); 5,840 (2002 census); 6,505 (1989 Soviet census).
