= Uglichsky =

Uglichsky (masculine), Uglichskaya (feminine), or Uglichskoye (neuter) may refer to:

- Uglichsky District, a district of Yaroslavl Oblast, Russia
- Uglichsky (cheese), a Russian hard cheese made of cow's milk
