= Kabansky (rural locality) =

Kabansky (Russian: Каба́нский; masculine), Kabanskaya (Каба́нская; feminine), or Kabanskoye (Каба́нское; neuter) is the name of several rural localities in Russia:

- Kabanskoye, Chelyabinsk Oblast, a selo in Bagaryaksky Selsoviet of Kaslinsky District of Chelyabinsk Oblast
- Kabanskoye, Yaroslavl Oblast, a selo in Dubrovitsky Rural Okrug of Pereslavsky District of Yaroslavl Oblast
