= Burmakino =

Burmakino Бурмакино
- Urban-type settlement
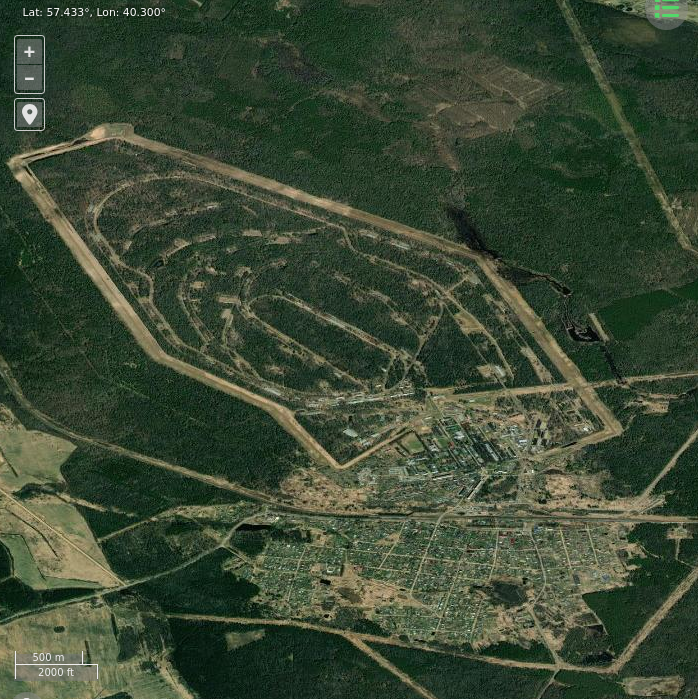
- Satellite imagery of Burmakino with its arsenal
- Interactive map of Burmakino
- Location of Burmakino Burmakino (Yaroslavl Oblast)
- Coordinates: 57.4148°N 40.2351°E
- Country: Russia
- Federal subject: Yaroslavl Oblast
- Administrative district: Nekrasovsky District
- Elevation: 130 m (430 ft)

Population (2010 Census)
  - Total: 2,945
  - Estimate (1 January 2018): 2,368 (−19.6%)
- Time zone: UTC+3 (MSK)
- Postal codes: 152290, 152291, 152295
- OKTMO ID: 78626409051

Burmakino (Russian: Бурма́кино) is an urban locality (an urban-type settlement) in Nekrasovsky District of Yaroslavl Oblast, Russia. Population: 2,945 (2010 census); 3,389 (2002 census); 3,800 (1989 Soviet census).

In 2009 it was listed by Russian media as the location of a ammunition storage area which was vulnerable to fire or explosions, the 6th Arsenal of the Navy of the Ministry of Defence, former V/Ch 09919 - 152291, Burmakino-1 (Бурмакино)) (Yaroslav-55).
