= Ishnya =

Ishnya Ишня
- Urban-type settlement
- Interactive map of Ishnya
- Location of Ishnya Ishnya (Yaroslavl Oblast)
- Coordinates: 57.1936°N 39.3485°E
- Country: Russia
- Federal subject: Yaroslavl Oblast
- Administrative district: Rostovsky District

Population (2010 Census)
  - Total: 3,127
  - Estimate (1 January 2018): 2,903 (−7.2%)
- Time zone: UTC+3 (MSK)
- Postal code: 152120
- OKTMO ID: 78637412051

Ishnya (Russian: Ишня) is an urban locality (an urban-type settlement) in Rostovsky District of Yaroslavl Oblast, Russia. Population: 3,127 (2010 census); 3,368 (2002 census); 3,889 (1989 Soviet census).
