= Andrei Zhirov =

Russian footballer and coach

Personal information
- Full name: Andrei Vasilyevich Zhirov
- Date of birth: 17 June 1971 (age 55)
- Place of birth: Krasnye Tkachi, Russian SFSR
- Height: 1.81 m (5 ft 11 in)
- Position: Defender

Youth career
- Yaroslavets Yaroslavl

Senior career*
Years	Team	Apps	(Gls)
1988–1989	FC Saturn Rybinsk	53	(4)
1990	FC Dynamo-2 Moscow	20	(1)
1990–1991	FC Dynamo Moscow	2	(0)
1991	FC Dinamo Sukhumi	26	(3)
1992	Bukovyna Chernivtsi	3	(0)
1992–1995	FC Chernomorets Novorossiysk	127	(9)
1996–1998	FC Tyumen	73	(1)
1998–2000	FC Chernomorets Novorossiysk	52	(0)
2001–2003	FC Shinnik Yaroslavl	56	(0)
2004–2005	FC Fakel Voronezh	51	(0)
2007	FC Shinnik-2-Vodokanal Yaroslavl		

Managerial career
- 2006: FC Shinnik Yaroslavl (assistant)
- 2008: FC Shinnik Yaroslavl (reserves fitness coach)
- * Club domestic league appearances and goals

Andrei Vasilyevich Zhirov (Russian: Андрей Васильевич Жиров; born 17 June 1971) is a Russian professional football coach and a former player.

== Club career ==
He made his debut in the Soviet Top League in 1990 for FC Dynamo Moscow.

== Honours ==
- Soviet Top League bronze: 1990.
