= Lesnaya Polyana =

Lesnaya Polyana Лесная Поляна
- Urban-type settlement
- Interactive map of Lesnaya Polyana
- Location of Lesnaya Polyana Lesnaya Polyana (Yaroslavl Oblast)
- Coordinates: 57.6887°N 39.8914°E
- Country: Russia
- Federal subject: Yaroslavl Oblast
- Administrative district: Yaroslavsky District
- Founded: 1957

Population (2010 Census)
  - Total: 2,974
  - Estimate (1 January 2018): 2,671 (−10.2%)
- Time zone: UTC+3 (MSK)
- Postal code: 150539
- OKTMO ID: 78650155051

Lesnaya Polyana (Russian: Лесна́я Поля́на) is an urban locality (an urban-type settlement) in Yaroslavsky District of Yaroslavl Oblast, Russia. Population: 2,974 (2010 census); 3,158 (2002 census); 3,312 (1989 Soviet census).
