= Porechye-Rybnoye =

Porechye-Rybnoye Поречье-Рыбное
- Urban-type settlement
- Interactive map of Porechye-Rybnoye
- Location of Porechye-Rybnoye Porechye-Rybnoye (Yaroslavl Oblast)
- Coordinates: 57.0953°N 39.3834°E
- Country: Russia
- Federal subject: Yaroslavl Oblast
- Administrative district: Rostovsky District

Population (2010 Census)
  - Total: 1,727
  - Estimate (1 January 2018): 1,597 (−7.5%)
- Time zone: UTC+3 (MSK)
- Postal code: 152128
- OKTMO ID: 78637442051

Porechye-Rybnoye (Russian: Поре́чье-Ры́бное) is an urban locality (an urban-type settlement) in Rostovsky District of Yaroslavl Oblast, Russia. Population: 1,727 (2010 census); 1,875 (2002 census); 2,505 (1989 Soviet census).
