= Krasnye Tkachi =

Krasnye Tkachi Красные Ткачи
- Urban-type settlement
- Interactive map of Krasnye Tkachi
- Location of Krasnye Tkachi Krasnye Tkachi (Yaroslavl Oblast)
- Coordinates: 57.4944°N 39.7513°E
- Country: Russia
- Federal subject: Yaroslavl Oblast
- Administrative district: Yaroslavsky District

Population (2010 Census)
  - Total: 3,943
  - Estimate (1 January 2018): 4,220 (+7%)
- Time zone: UTC+3 (MSK)
- Postal code: 150522
- OKTMO ID: 78650430193

Krasnye Tkachi (Russian: Кра́сные Ткачи́) is an urban locality (an urban-type settlement) in Yaroslavsky District of Yaroslavl Oblast, Russia. Population: 3,943 (2010 census); 4,141 (2002 census); 4,458 (1989 Soviet census).
