= Semibratovo =

Semibratovo Семибратово
- Urban-type settlement
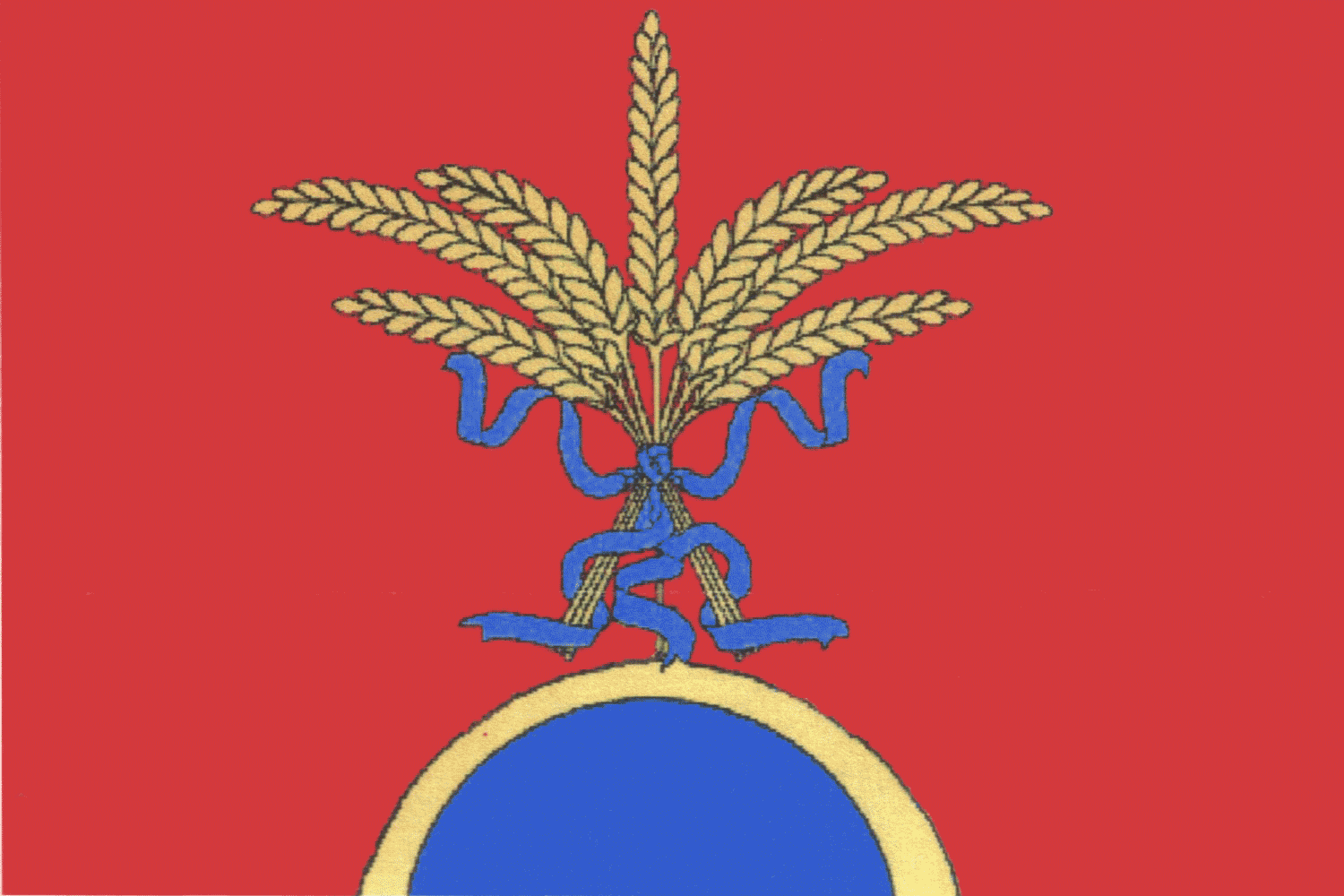
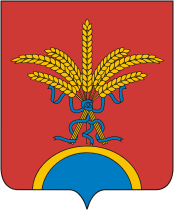
- Flag Coat of arms
- Interactive map of Semibratovo
- Location of Semibratovo Semibratovo (Yaroslavl Oblast)
- Coordinates: 57.3002°N 39.5392°E
- Country: Russia
- Federal subject: Yaroslavl Oblast
- Administrative district: Rostovsky District

Population (2010 Census)
  - Total: 7,096
  - Estimate (1 January 2018): 6,734 (−5.1%)
- Time zone: UTC+3 (MSK)
- Postal code: 152101
- OKTMO ID: 78637447051

Semibratovo (Russian: Семибра́тово) is an urban locality (an urban-type settlement) in Rostovsky District of Yaroslavl Oblast, Russia. Population: 7,096 (2010 census); 7,672 (2002 census); 8,485 (1989 Soviet census).
