= Gavrilov-Yam =

Town in Yaroslavl Oblast, Russia

Gavrilov-Yam Гаврилов-Ям
- Town
- Flag Coat of arms
- Interactive map of Gavrilov-Yam
- Location of Gavrilov-Yam Gavrilov-Yam (Yaroslavl Oblast)
- Coordinates: 57°19′N 39°51′E
- Country: Russia
- Federal subject: Yaroslavl Oblast
- Administrative district: Gavrilov-Yamsky District
- Town of district significanceSelsoviet: Gavrilov-Yam
- Founded: 1545
- Town status since: 1938
- Elevation: 100 m (330 ft)

Population (2010 Census)
  - Total: 17,791
  - Estimate (2025): 15,379 (−13.6%)

Administrative status
  - Capital of: town of district significance of Gavrilov-Yam

Municipal status
  - Municipal district: Gavrilov-Yamsky Municipal District
  - Urban settlement: Gavrilov-Yam Urban Settlement
  - Capital of: Gavrilov-Yamsky Municipal District, Gavrilov-Yam Urban Settlement
- Time zone: UTC+3 (MSK)
- Postal codes: 152240, 152241
- OKTMO ID: 78612101001
- Website: www.gavrilovyamgor.ru

Gavrilov-Yam (Russian: Гаври́лов-Ям) is a town and the administrative center of Gavrilov-Yamsky (or Gavrilov-Yamskiy) District in Yaroslavl Oblast, Russia, located on the Kotorosl River. Population: 17,791 (2010 census); 19,105 (2002 census); 21,353 (1989 Soviet census).

== History ==
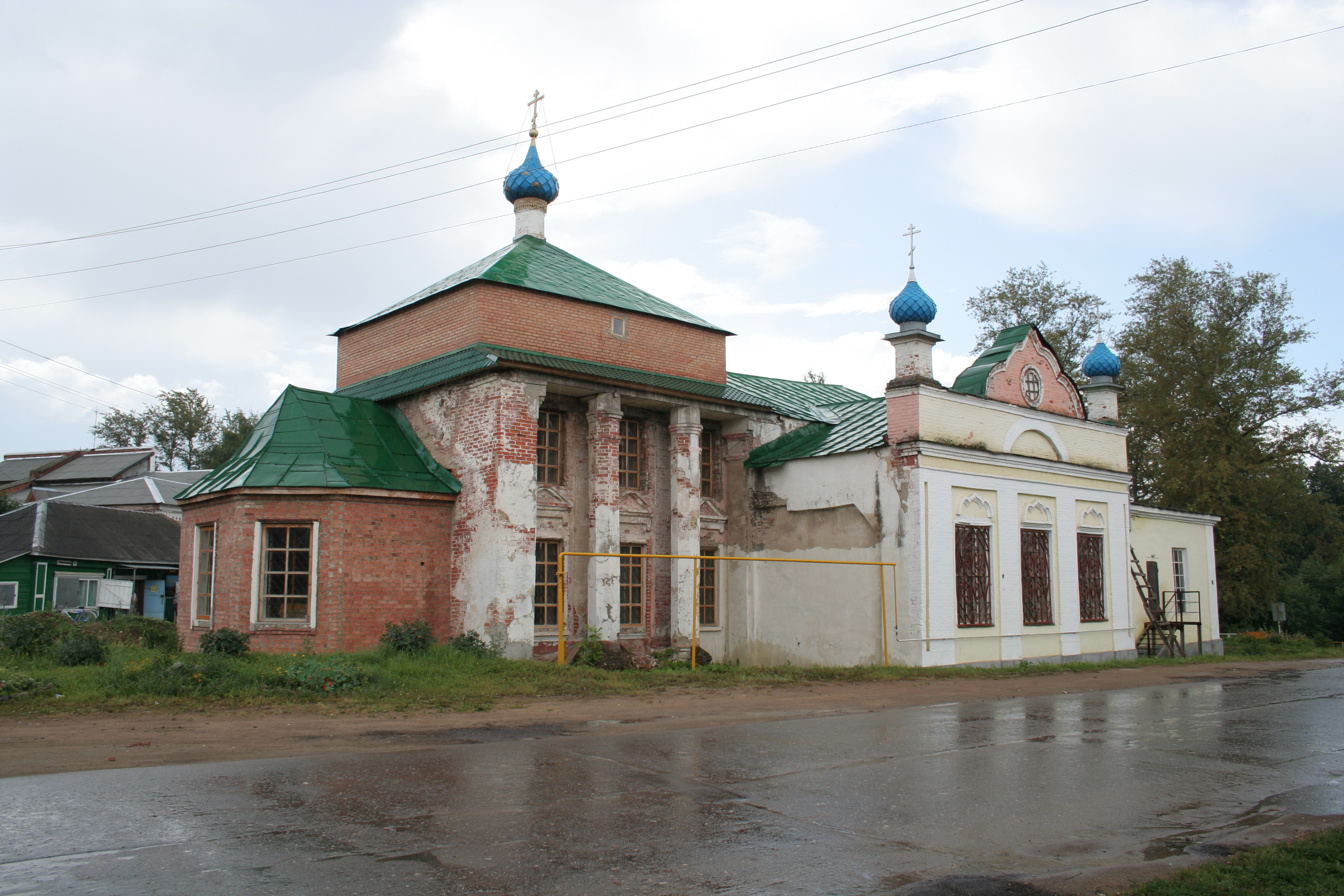
Church

The first mention of a settlement on the site of modern Gavrilov-Yam dates back to 1545. Then it was a small village of Gavrilovo, in which there were only 7 courtyards and it belonged to the Varnitsky Trinity-Sergius Monastery.

At the end of the 16th century, by decree of Tsar Ivan the Terrible, the village was renamed into Gavrilov Yam, later into Gavrilov-Yamskaya Sloboda, and at the end of the 18th century, in connection with the construction of a stone church - and into the village of Gavrilov-Yam. Town status was granted in 1938.

In the early 2000s, the weaving production of the Moscow-based factory, Trekhgornaya Manufactory, was transferred to the oblast to which the town belongs.

The Gavrilov-Yamskiy Flax Mill traces its history back to the Lokalov textile factory. The mill carries out all stages of flax processing, from flax-combed production to finished products (linen and mixed fabrics, patterned tablecloths, napkins, towels, etc.). The plant is the only one in the country that produces art canvas.

== Administrative and municipal status ==
Within the framework of administrative divisions, Gavrilov-Yam serves as the administrative center of the Gavrilov-Yamsky (or Gavrilov-Yamskiy) District. As an administrative division, it is incorporated within Gavrilov-Yamsky (or Gavrilov-Yamskiy) District as the town of district significance of Gavrilov-Yam. As a municipal division, the town of district significance of Gavrilov-Yam is incorporated within Gavrilov-Yamsky (Gavrilov-Yamskiy) Municipal District as Gavrilov-Yam Urban Settlement.
