= Tutayev =

Town in Yaroslavl Oblast, Russia

Tutayev Тутаев
- Town
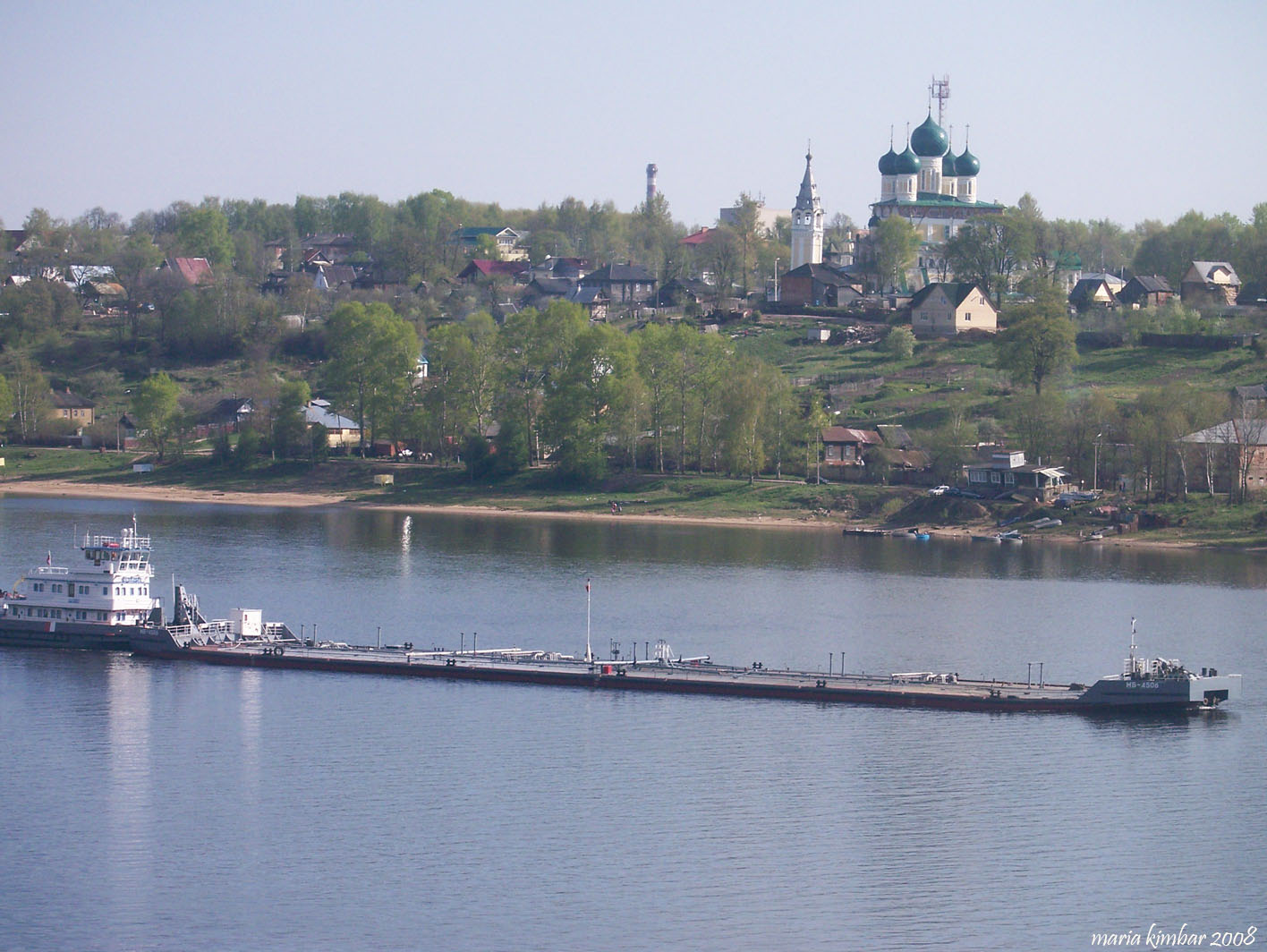
- View across the Volga of Tutayev's Borisoglebsk side (right bank) seen from the Romanov side on the left bank

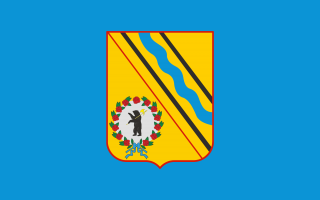
- Flag Coat of arms
- Interactive map of Tutayev
- Location of Tutayev Tutayev (Yaroslavl Oblast)
- Coordinates: 57°53′N 39°33′E
- Country: Russia
- Federal subject: Yaroslavl Oblast
- Founded: 1822
- Elevation: 130 m (430 ft)

Population (2010 Census)
  - Total: 41,005
  - Estimate (2025): 39,009 (−4.9%)

Administrative status
  - Subordinated to: Town of oblast significance of Tutayev
  - Capital of: Tutayevsky District, Town of oblast significance of Tutayev

Municipal status
  - Municipal district: Tutayevsky Municipal District
  - Urban settlement: Tutayev Urban Settlement
  - Capital of: Tutayevsky Municipal District, Tutayev Urban Settlement
- Time zone: UTC+3 (MSK)
- Postal code: 152300–152303
- OKTMO ID: 78643101001

Tutayev (Russian: Тута́ев) is a town in Yaroslavl Oblast, Russia. It was established in 1822 as Romanov-Borisoglebsk from two much older towns on opposite sides of the Volga River: Romanov and Borisoglebsk.

Tutayev's population is 39,643 as of 2020. In comparison, population totals from past censuses were: 41,005 (2010 census); 42,644 (2002 census); 39,822 (1989 Soviet census).

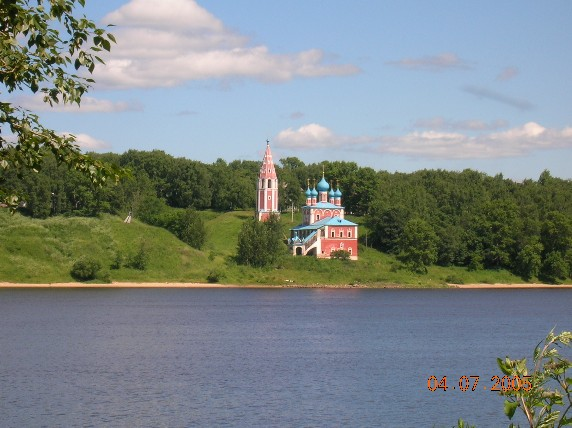
The Volga divides Tutayev into two parts

== History ==
Before 1918, the town was called Romanov-Borisoglebsk (Рома́нов-Борисогле́бск); the Bolshevik government of the USSR renamed it Tutayev, after a Red Army officer. Until 1822, when an order of the Tsar united them, there were two separate towns: Romanov, founded in the late-14th century, and Borisoglebsk, established in the 15th century. The right bank of the town is still referred to by locals as the "Borisoglebsk side", and the left as the "Romanov side".

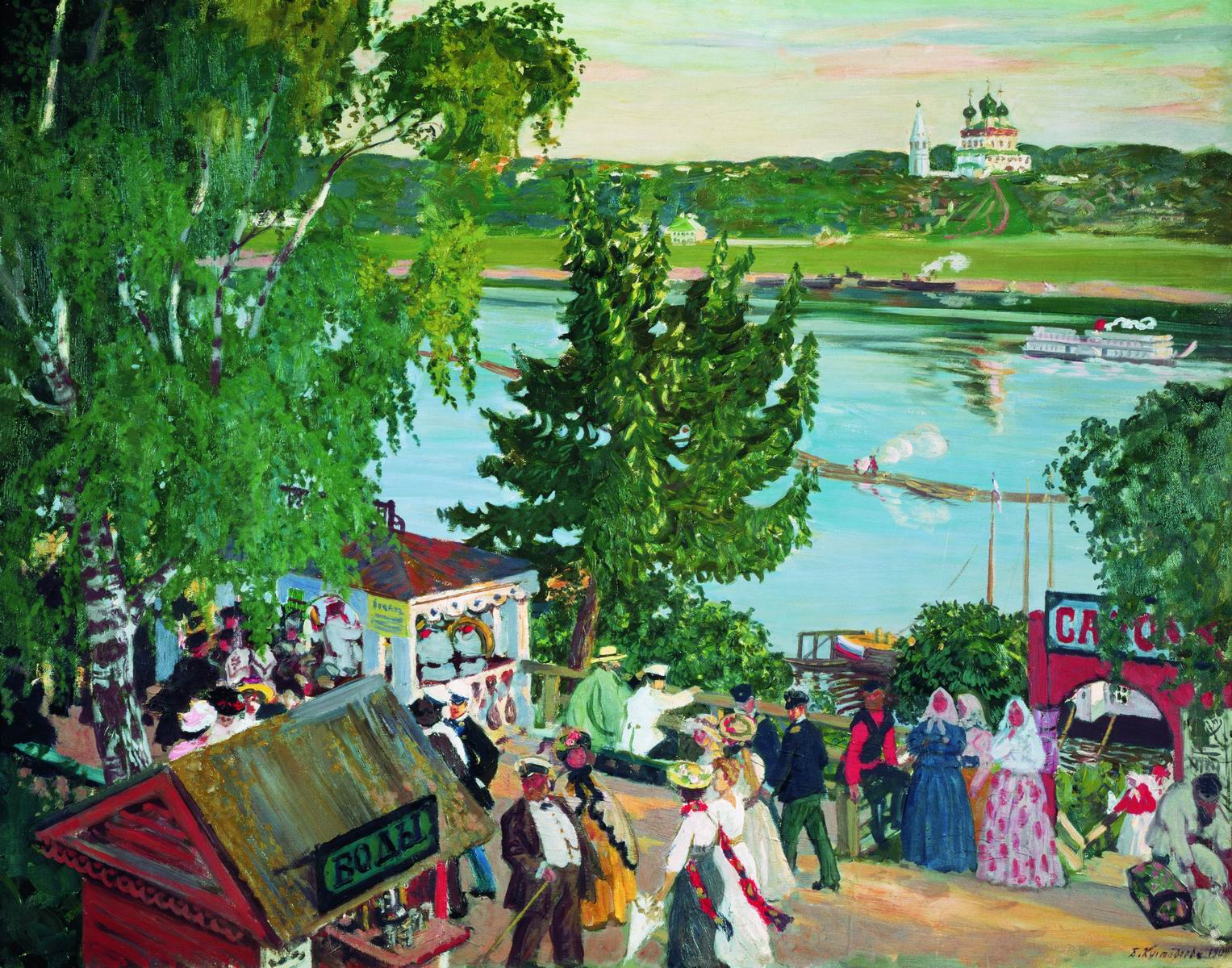
Promenade Along the Volga was painted by Boris Kustodiev in Romanov in 1907

== Geography ==
The majority of the population lives on the Borisoglebsk side, on the right bank of the river. The areas of town nearest to the Volga's right bank have many old wooden houses and historical buildings —including the Cathedral of the Resurrection— but further away from the river, Soviet-era apartment buildings predominate. There is no bridge across the Volga in Tutayev, so people have to use a ferry or, alternatively, travel north to Rybinsk or south to Yaroslavl to cross.

== Paleontology ==
Fossils of Early Triassic temnospondyls are known from Tutayev. Remains of Thoosuchus yakovlevi and Benthosuchus korobkovi were found in the Lower Olenekian deposits of this location.

== Architecture and sights ==
=== Historic churches ===
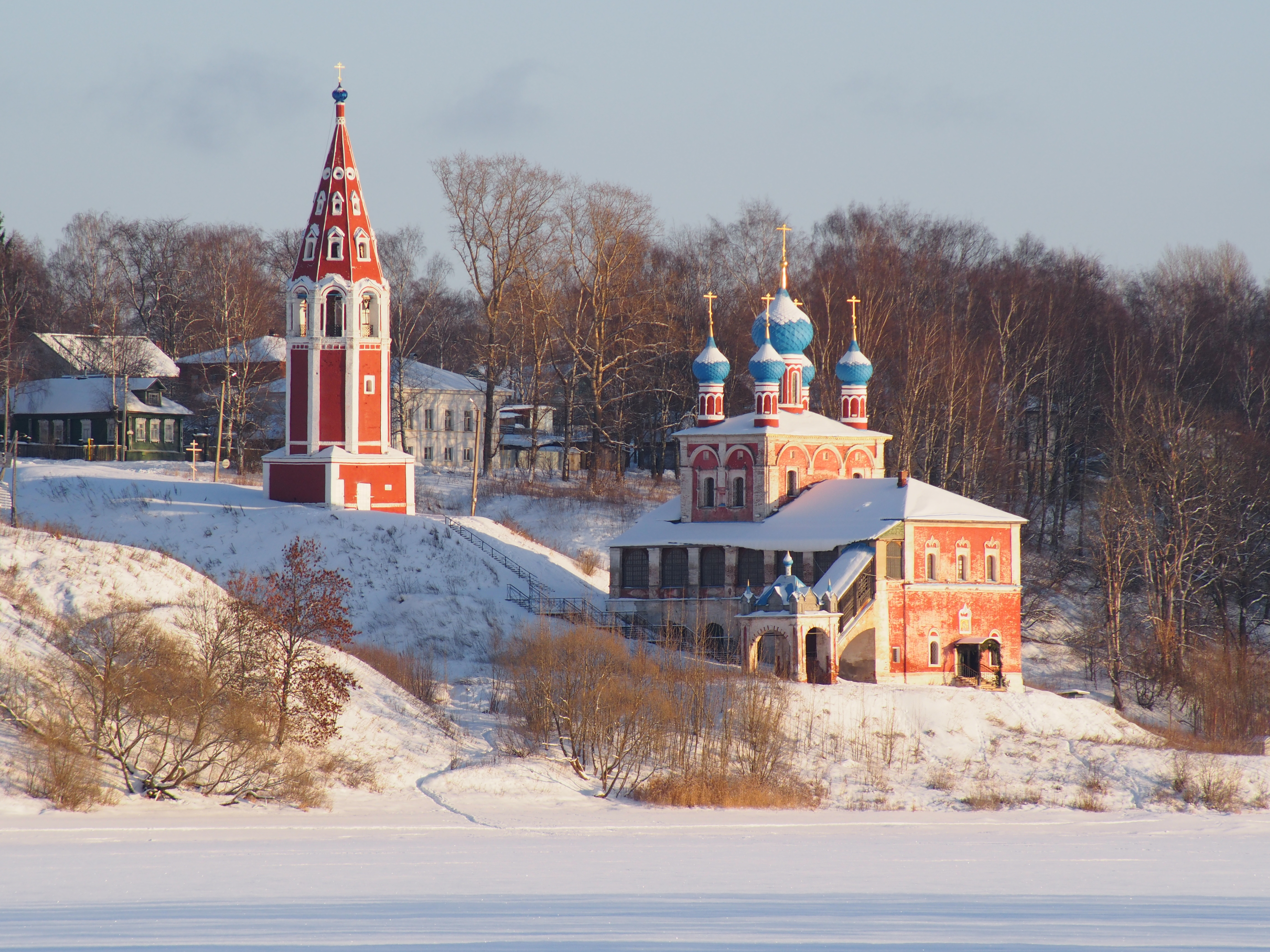
Church of the Transfiguration

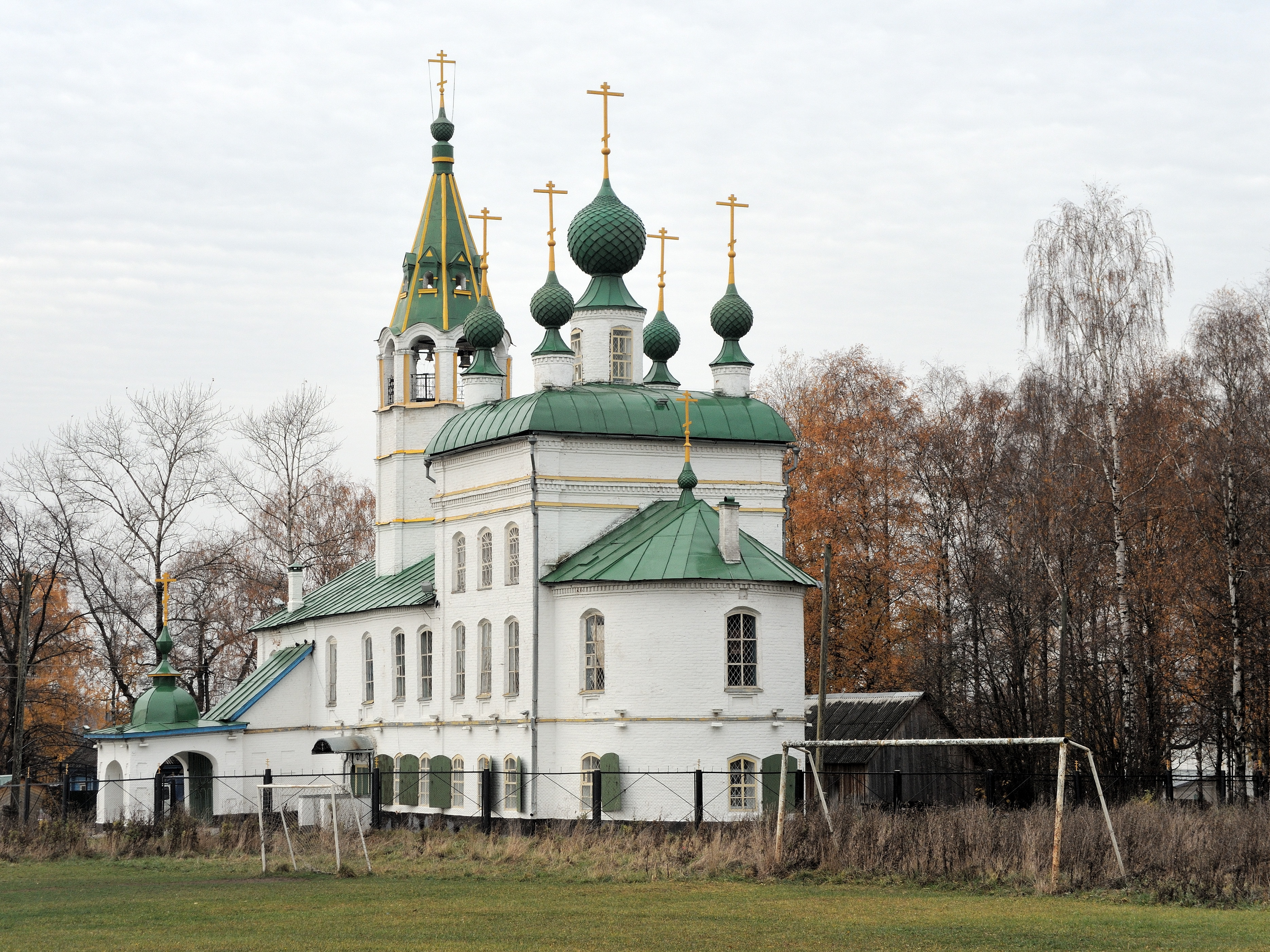
Church of the Ascension

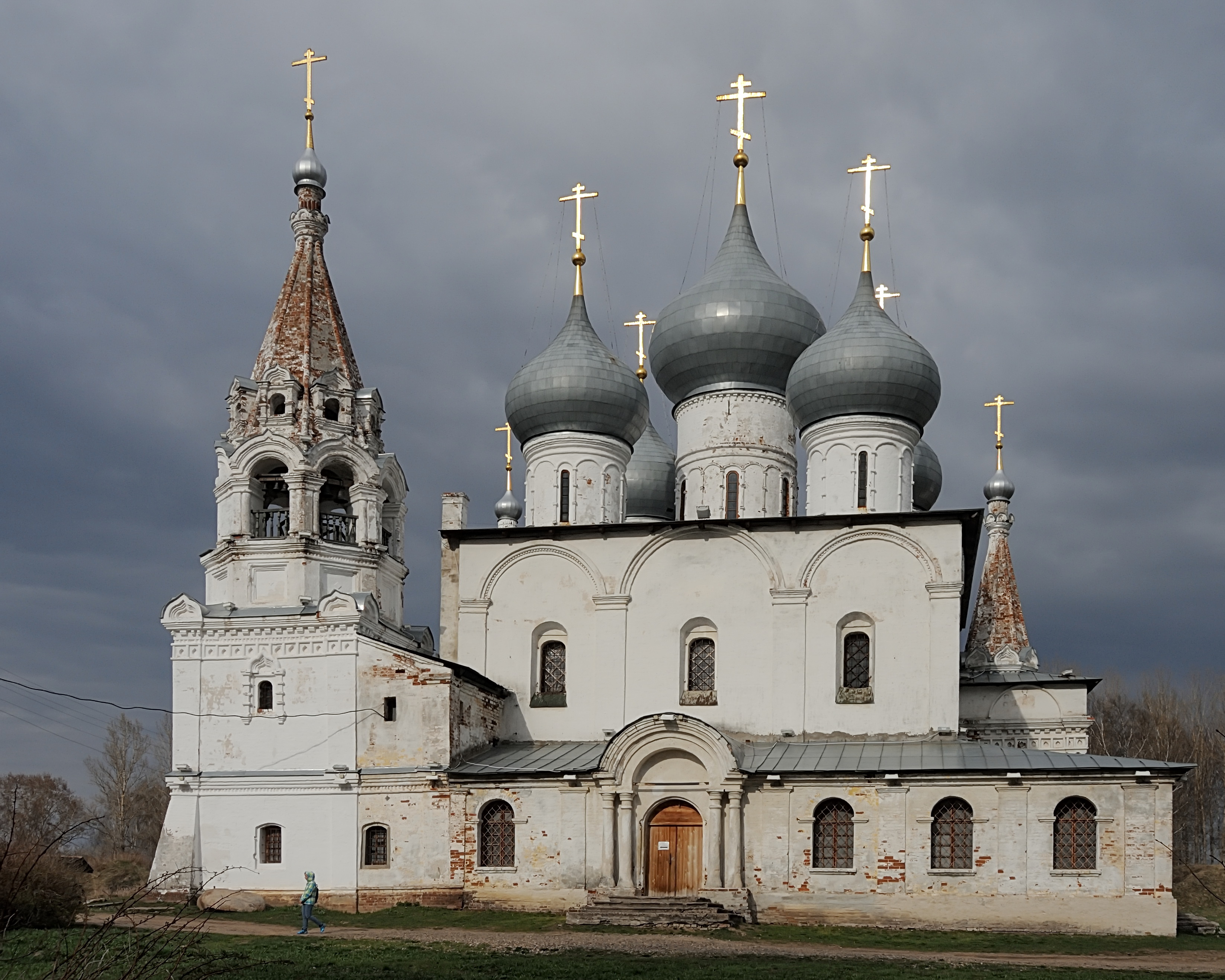
Holy Cross Cathedral

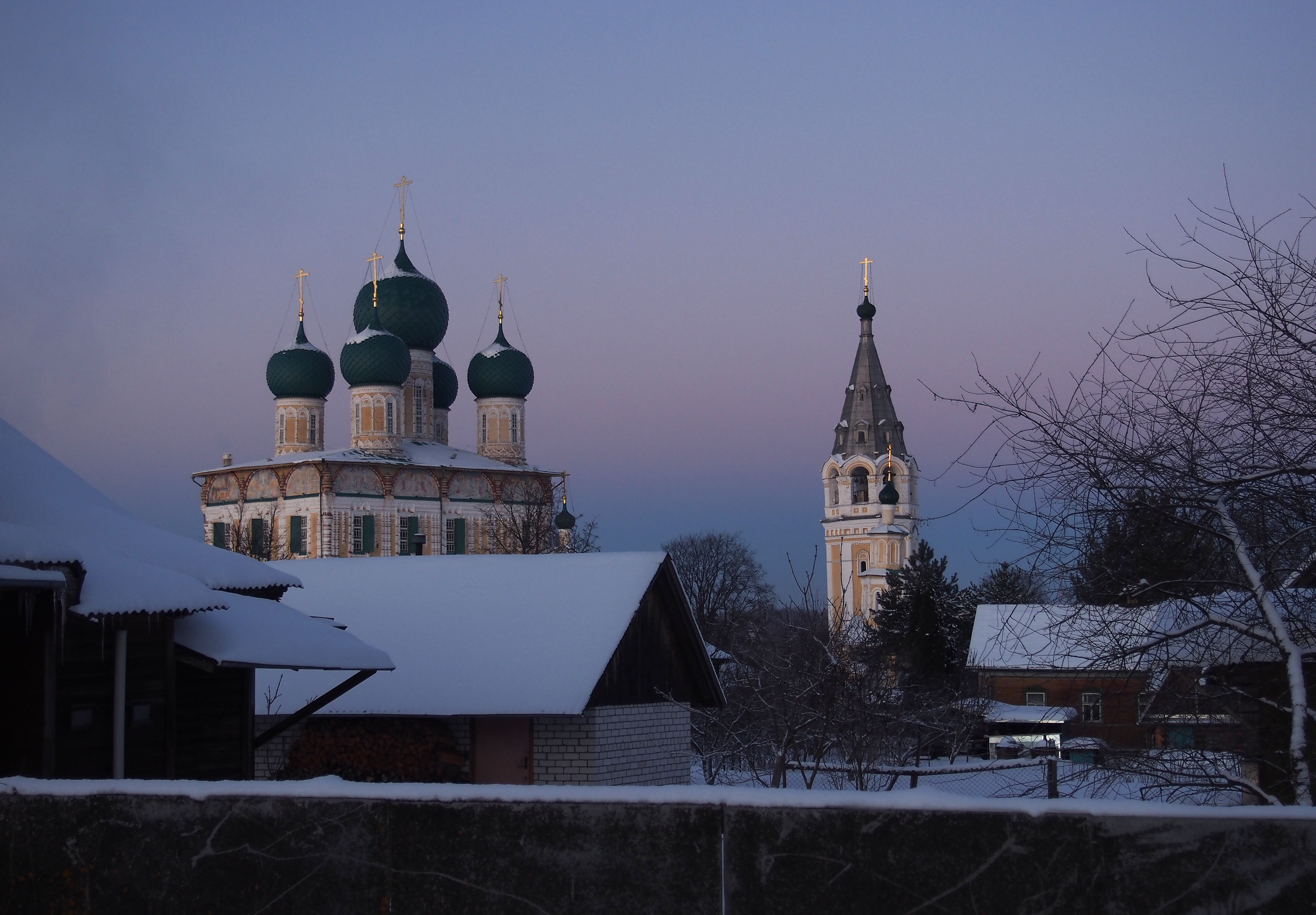
The Resurrection Cathedral in Tutayev

On the right, Borisoglebsk, riverbank:

- Resurrection Cathedral (1652–1678)

Churches located on the left, Romanov, bank of the river:

- Romanovsky Holy Cross Cathedral (1658)
- Church of the Annunciation of the Blessed Virgin Mary (Romanov-Borisoglebsk) (1660)
- Saviour-Archangel Church (Russian: Спасо-Архангельская церковь; 1746–1751)
- Church of the Kazan-Transfiguration (1758)
- Church of the Intercession (Покровская церковь; first mentioned in historical records, 1781)
- Church of the Life-Giving Trinity on Pogost (on the 'country church-grange', or simply "Trinity Church"; Russian: Церковь Живоначальной Троицы на погосте; 1783)
- Leontievskaya Church of the Ascension (Церковь Вознесения (Леонтьевская); 1795)
- Church of St. Tikhon (Церковь Святителя Тихона; 1911–1913)
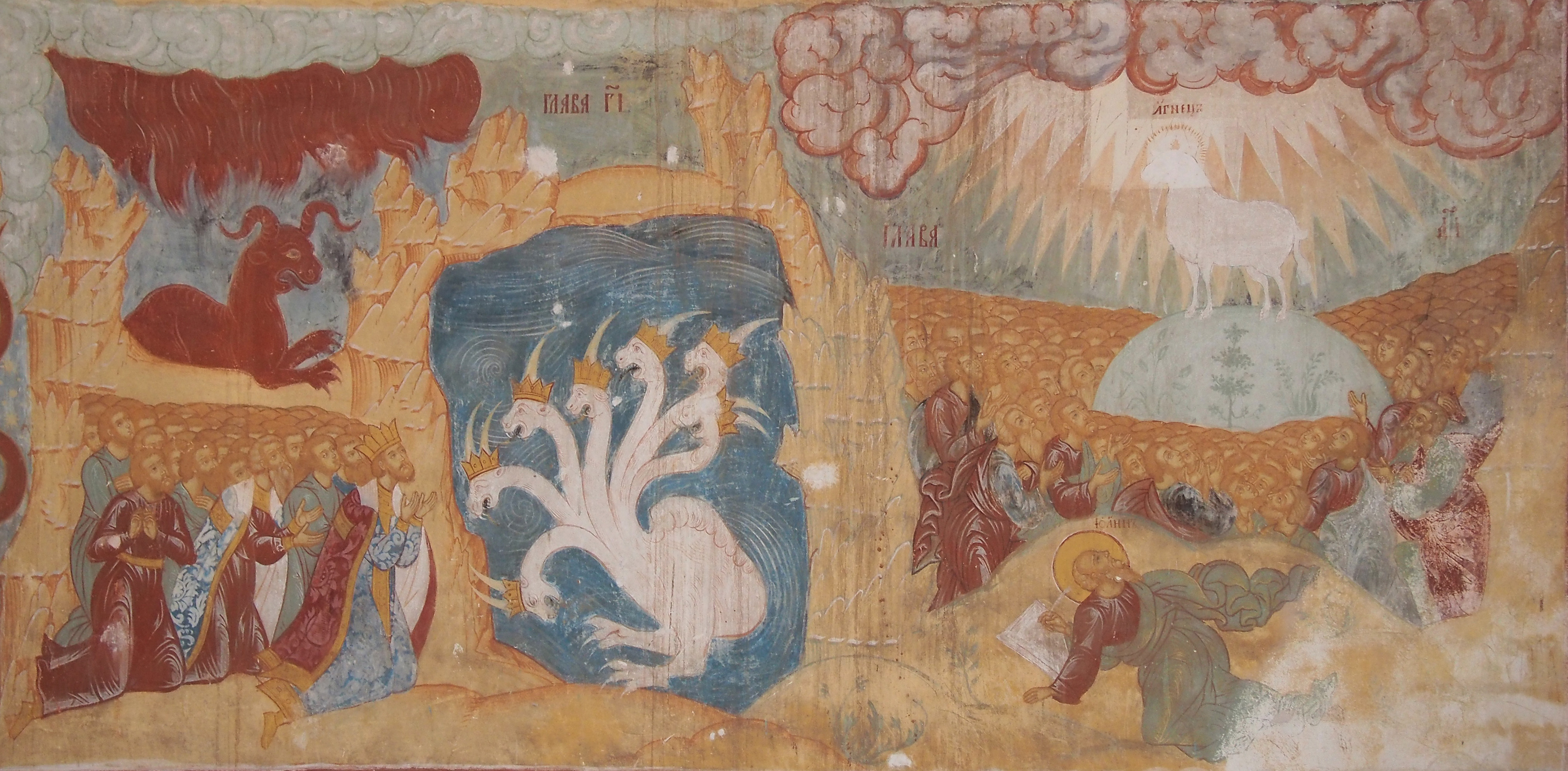
Apocalypse fresco by Nikitin, Holy Cross Cathedral

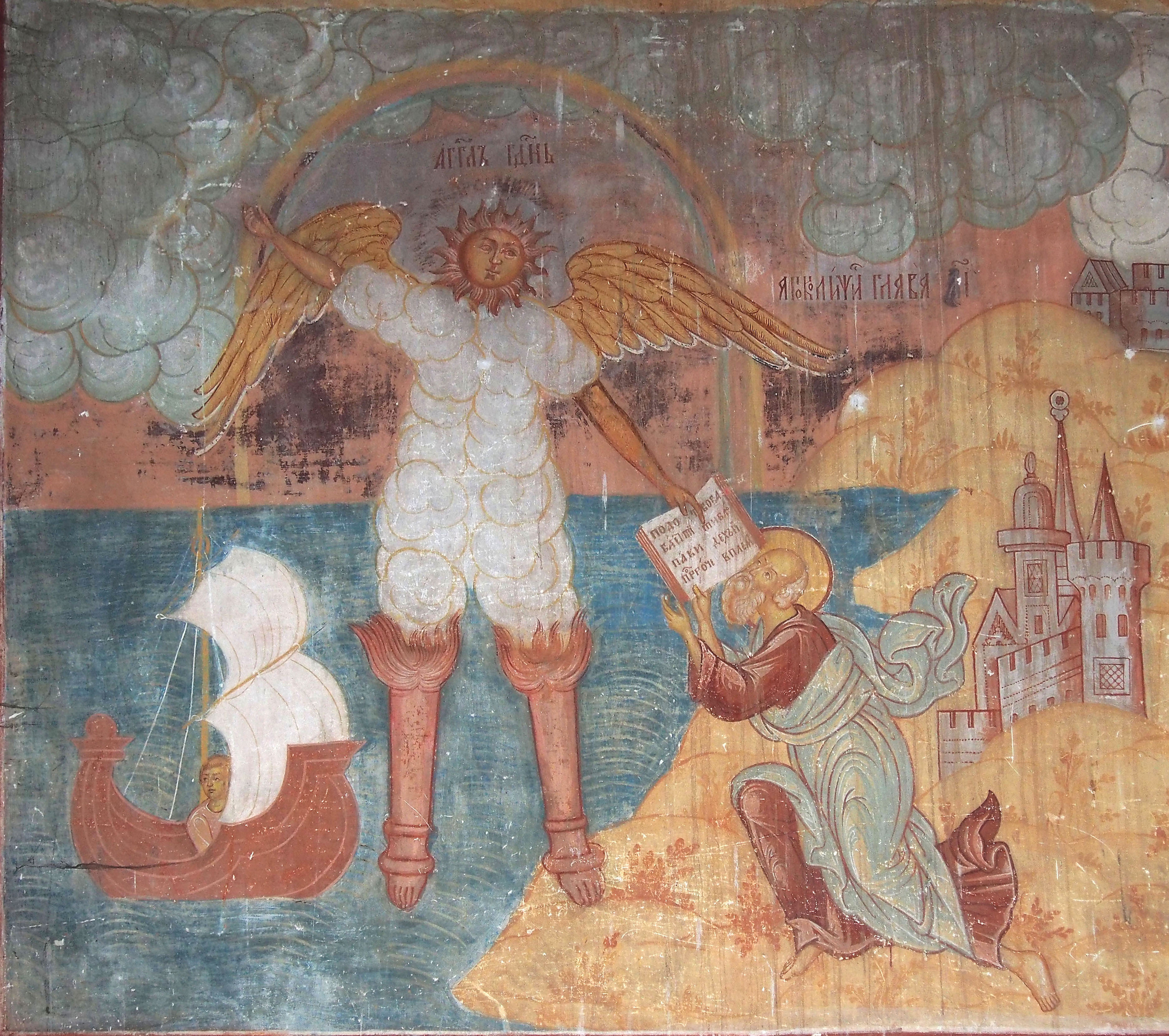
Angel of the Lord fresco by Nikitin, Holy Cross Cathedral

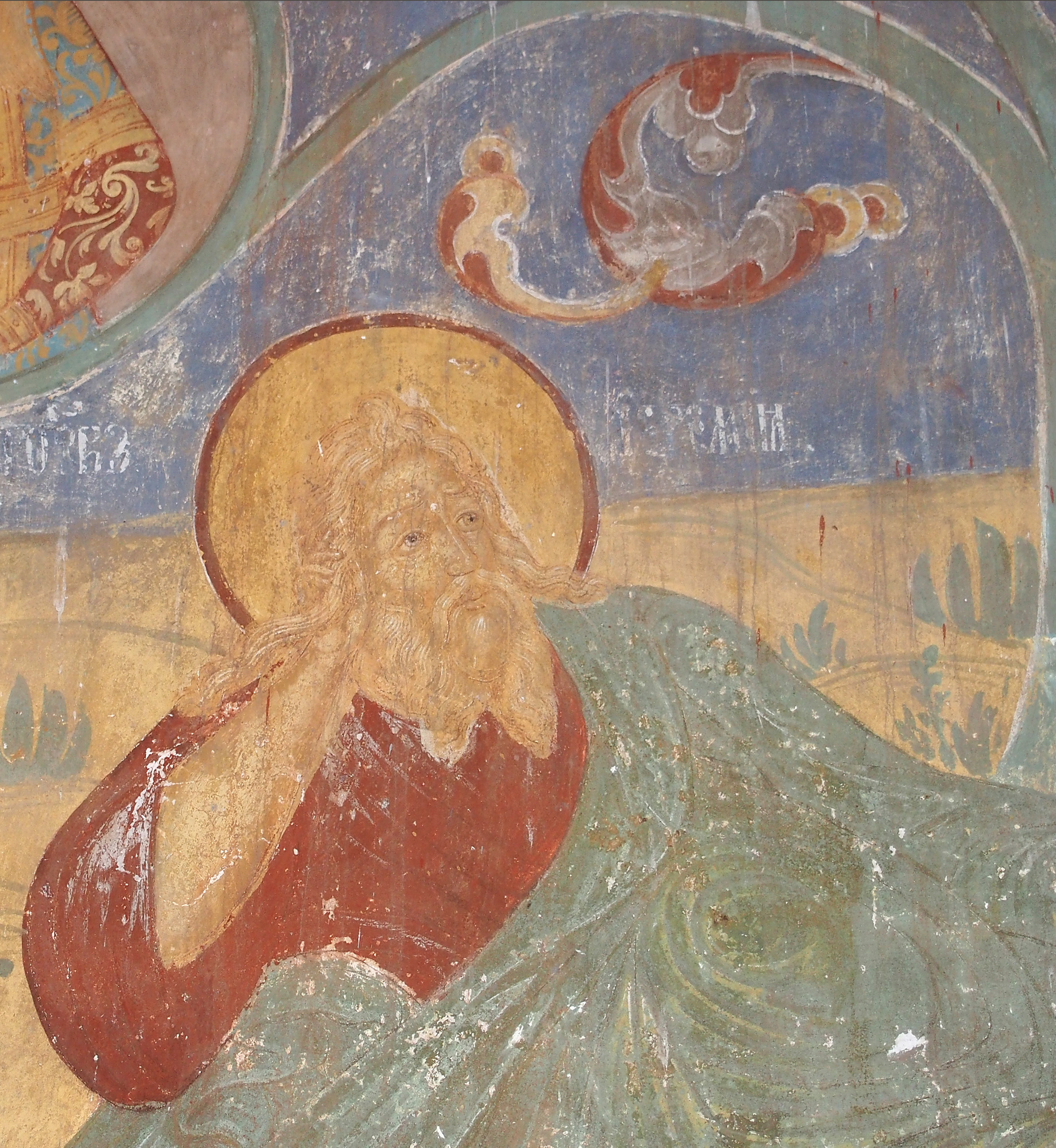
Fresco by Gury Nikitin—Prophet Jeremiah, Holy Cross Cathedral, southern wall

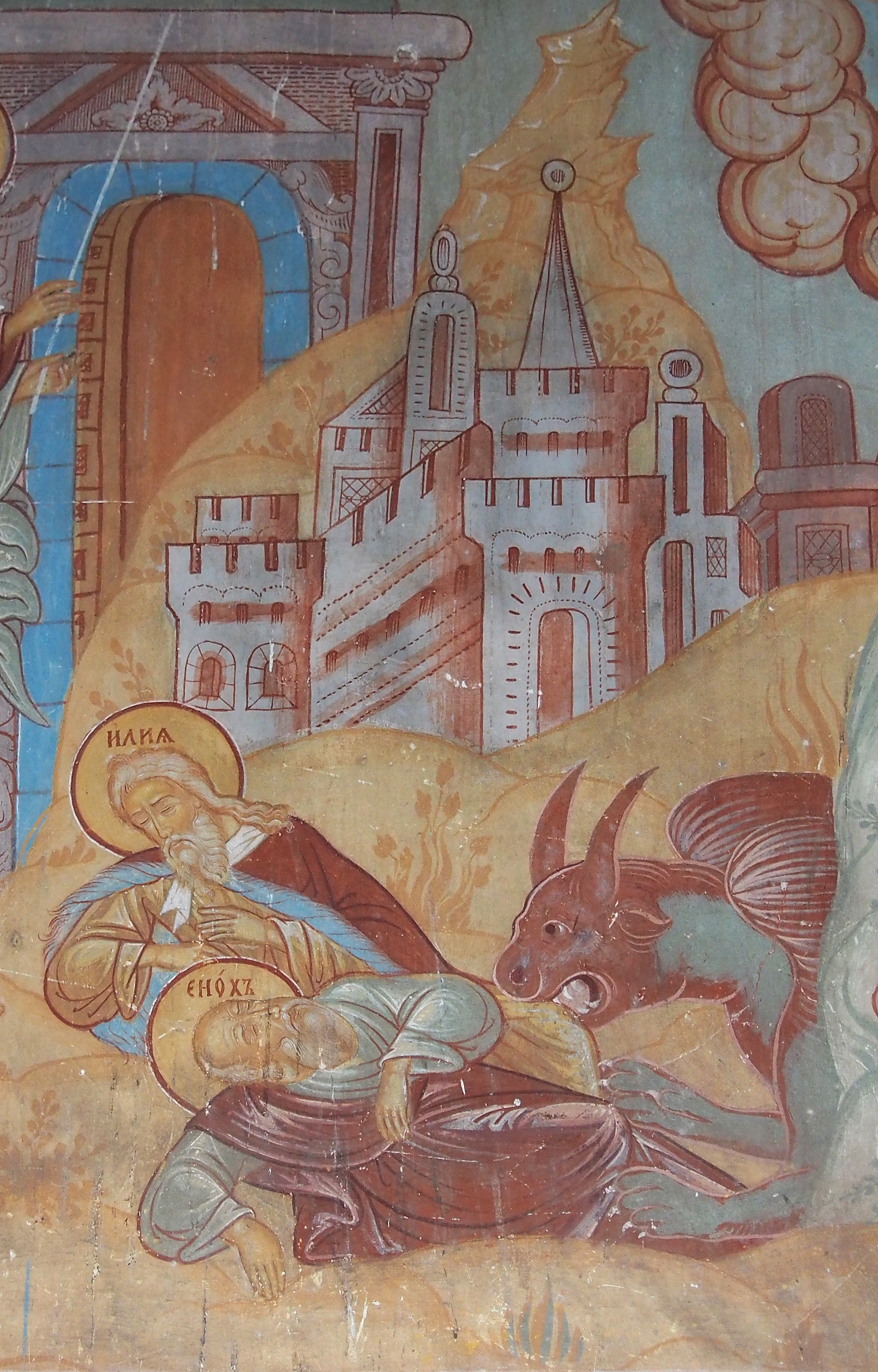
Prophets Elijah and Enoch, Holy Cross Cathedral, western wall of the quadrangle, fresco by Nikitin

== Administrative and municipal status ==
Within the framework of administrative divisions, Tutayev serves as the administrative center of Tutayevsky District, even though it is not a part of it. As an administrative division, it is incorporated separately as the town of oblast significance of Tutayev—an administrative unit with the status equal to that of the districts. As a municipal division, the town of oblast significance of Tutayev is incorporated within Tutayevsky Municipal District as Tutayev Urban Settlement.

== Economy ==
Tutayev is home to the Tutayev Motor Plant, which is one of the largest producers of diesel engines for automobiles and tractors in the Commonwealth of Independent States.

== See also ==
- Romanov (sheep), a breed of sheep that takes its name from the town of Romanov
