= Filimonovo, Kirillovsky District, Vologda Oblast =

Filimonovo Филимоново
- Village
- Location within Vologda Oblast Location within Russia
- Coordinates: 59°55′N 38°44′E
- Country: Russia
- Region: Vologda Oblast
- District: Kirillovsky District
- Time zone: UTC+3:00

Filimonovo (Russian: Филимоново) is a rural locality (a village) in Nikolotorzhskoye Rural Settlement, Kirillovsky District, Vologda Oblast, Russia. The population was 12 as of 2002.

== Geography ==
Filimonovo is located 30 km northeast of Kirillov (the district's administrative centre) by road. Sitkovo is the nearest rural locality.
