= Filimonovo, Vladimir Oblast =

Filimonovo Филимоново
- Village
- Location within Vladimir Oblast Location within Russia
- Coordinates: 55°58′N 39°15′E
- Country: Russia
- Region: Vladimir Oblast
- District: Petushinsky District
- Time zone: UTC+3:00

Filimonovo (Russian: Филимоново) is a rural locality (a village) in Nagornoye Rural Settlement, Petushinsky District, Vladimir Oblast, Russia. The population was 10 as of 2010. There are 5 streets.

== Geography ==
Filimonovo is located 24 km northwest of Petushki (the district's administrative centre) by road. Volginsky is the nearest rural locality.
