= Nekrasovskoye =

Nekrasovskoye Некрасовское
- Urban-type settlement
- Location of Nekrasovskoye
- Location of Nekrasovskoye Nekrasovskoye (Yaroslavl Oblast)
- Coordinates: 57°40′00″N 40°22′00″E
- Country: Russia
- Federal subject: Yaroslavl Oblast
- Administrative district: Nekrasovsky District
- Urban-type settlement status since: 1940

Population (2010 Census)
  - Total: 6,164
  - Estimate (2018): 5,797 (−6%)

Municipal status
  - Municipal district: Nekrasovsky Municipal District
  - Capital of: Nekrasovsky Municipal District, Nekrasovskoy Urban Settlement
- Time zone: UTC+3 (MSK)
- Postal code(s): 152260
- Dialing code(s): +7 48531
- OKTMO ID: 78626457051

Nekrasovskoye (Russian: Некра́совское) is an urban locality (a work settlement) the administrative center of Nekrasovsky District in Yaroslavl Oblast.

== History ==
First mentioned in 1214 as the village of Sol Vilikaya (Russian: Соль Великая) in the fight Rostov Principality Konstantin and Vladimir - George for local salt sources. Later, the settlement was known as Bolshie Soli (Russian: Большие Соли). In the 15th to 17th centuries mid saltworks worked here (at the end of the 16th century was Varnitsa). In subsequent years, more salt famous for their wood-carvers and masons.

On February 20, 1934, the Presidium of the Central Executive Committee decided to transfer the administrative center of the district of the village Bolshesolskogo Babaiki to the Nekrovskoye.
