= Uglichsky District =

Uglichsky District Угличский район (Russian)
- District
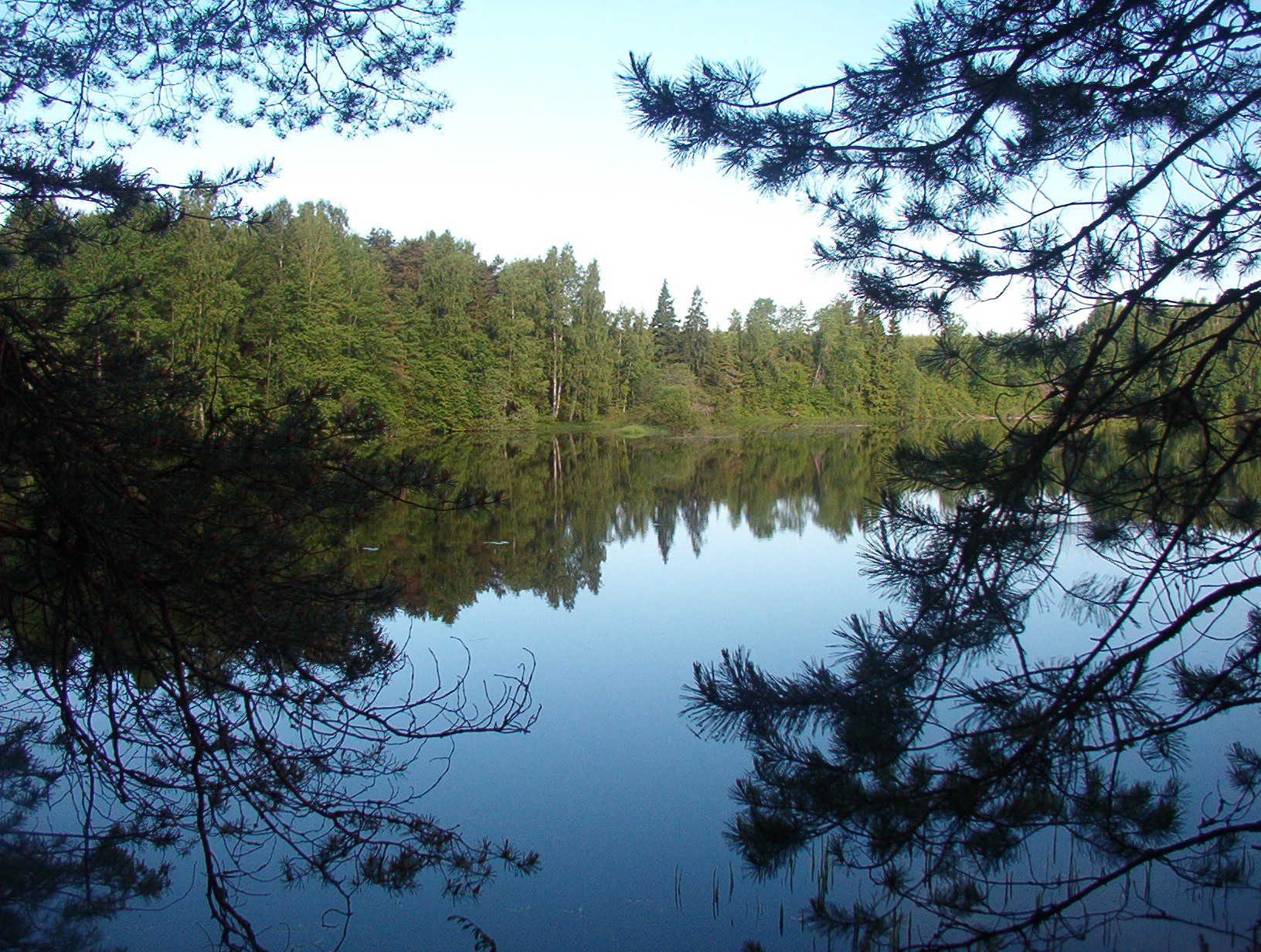
- The Uleyma River in Uglichsky District

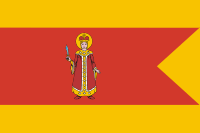
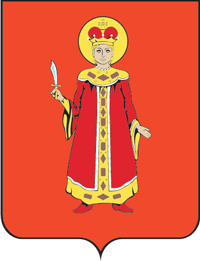
- Flag Coat of arms
- Location of Uglichsky District in Yaroslavl Oblast
- Coordinates: 57°32′N 38°20′E
- Country: Russia
- Federal subject: Yaroslavl Oblast
- Established: 1929
- Administrative center: Uglich

Area
  - Total: 2,568 km^{2} (992 sq mi)

Population (2010 Census)
  - Total: 13,255
  - Estimate (2018): 45,259 (+241.4%)
  - Density: 5.162/km^{2} (13.37/sq mi)
  - Urban: 0%
  - Rural: 100%

Administrative structure
  - Administrative divisions: 17 Rural okrugs
  - Inhabited localities: 500 rural localities

Municipal structure
  - Municipally incorporated as: Uglichsky Municipal District
  - Municipal divisions: 1 urban settlements, 5 rural settlements
- Time zone: UTC+3 (MSK)
- OKTMO ID: 78646000
- Website: http://www.uglich.ru/

Uglichsky District (Russian: У́гличский райо́н) is an administrative and municipal district (raion), one of the seventeen in Yaroslavl Oblast, Russia. It is located in the southwest of the oblast. The area of the district is 2,568 square kilometers (992 sq mi). Its administrative center is the town of Uglich (which is not administratively a part of the district). Population: 13,255 (2010 Census); 15,540 (2002 census); 18,069 (1989 Soviet census).

== Administrative and municipal status ==
Within the framework of administrative divisions, Uglichsky District is one of the seventeen in the oblast. The town of Uglich serves as its administrative center, despite being incorporated separately as a town of oblast significance—an administrative unit with the status equal to that of the districts.

As a municipal division, the district is incorporated as Uglichsky Municipal District, with the town of oblast significance of Uglich being incorporated within it as Uglich Urban Settlement.
