= Gavrilov-Yamsky District =

Gavrilov-Yamsky District Гаврилов-Ямский район (Russian)
- District
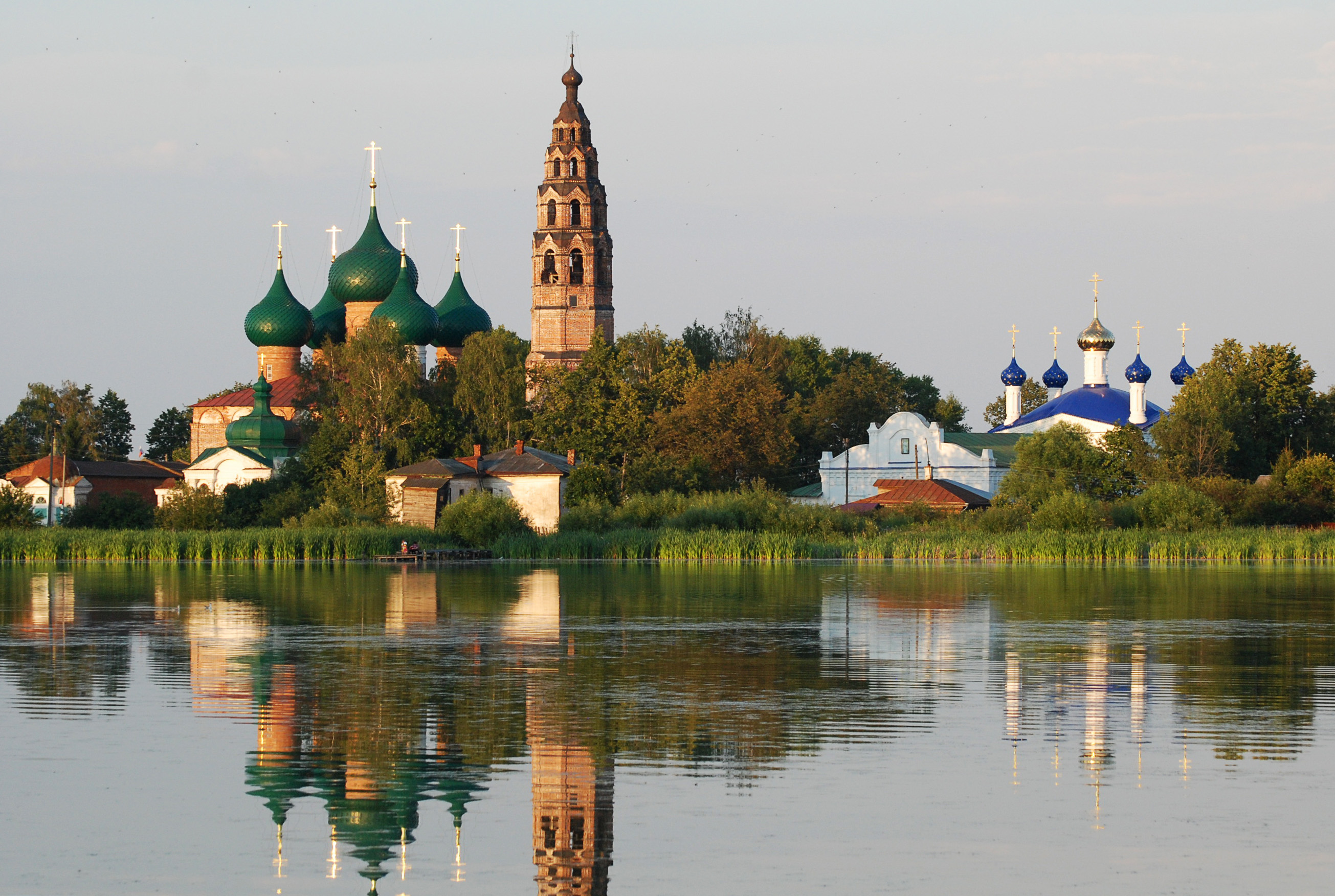
- Velikoselsky Kremlin

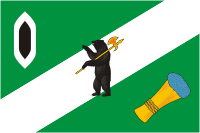
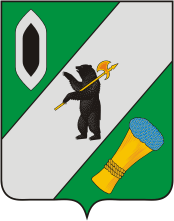
- Flag Coat of arms
- Location of Gavrilov-Yamsky District in Yaroslavl Oblast
- Coordinates: 57°18′N 39°52′E
- Country: Russia
- Federal subject: Yaroslavl Oblast
- Established: 10 June 1929
- Administrative center: Gavrilov-Yam

Area
  - Total: 1,120 km^{2} (430 sq mi)

Population (2010 Census)
  - Total: 26,558
  - Estimate (2018): 25,912 (−2.4%)
  - Density: 23.7/km^{2} (61.4/sq mi)
  - Urban: 67.0%
  - Rural: 33.0%

Administrative structure
  - Administrative divisions: 1 Towns of district significance, 9 Rural okrugs
  - Inhabited localities: 1 cities/towns, 195 rural localities

Municipal structure
  - Municipally incorporated as: Gavrilov-Yamsky Municipal District
  - Municipal divisions: 1 urban settlements, 4 rural settlements
- Time zone: UTC+3 (MSK)
- OKTMO ID: 78612000
- Website: http://www.gavyam.ru/

Gavrilov-Yamsky District (Russian: Гаврилов-Ямский райо́н or Gavrilov-Yamskiy District) is an administrative and municipal district (raion), one of the seventeen in Yaroslavl Oblast, Russia. It is located in the east of the oblast. The area of the district is 1,120 square kilometers (430 sq mi). Its administrative center is the town of Gavrilov-Yam. Population: 26,558 (2010 Census); 28,923 (2002 census); 32,770 (1989 Soviet census). The population of Gavrilov-Yam accounts for 67.0% of the district's total population.
