= Tutayevsky District =

Tutayevsky District Тутаевский район (Russian)
- District
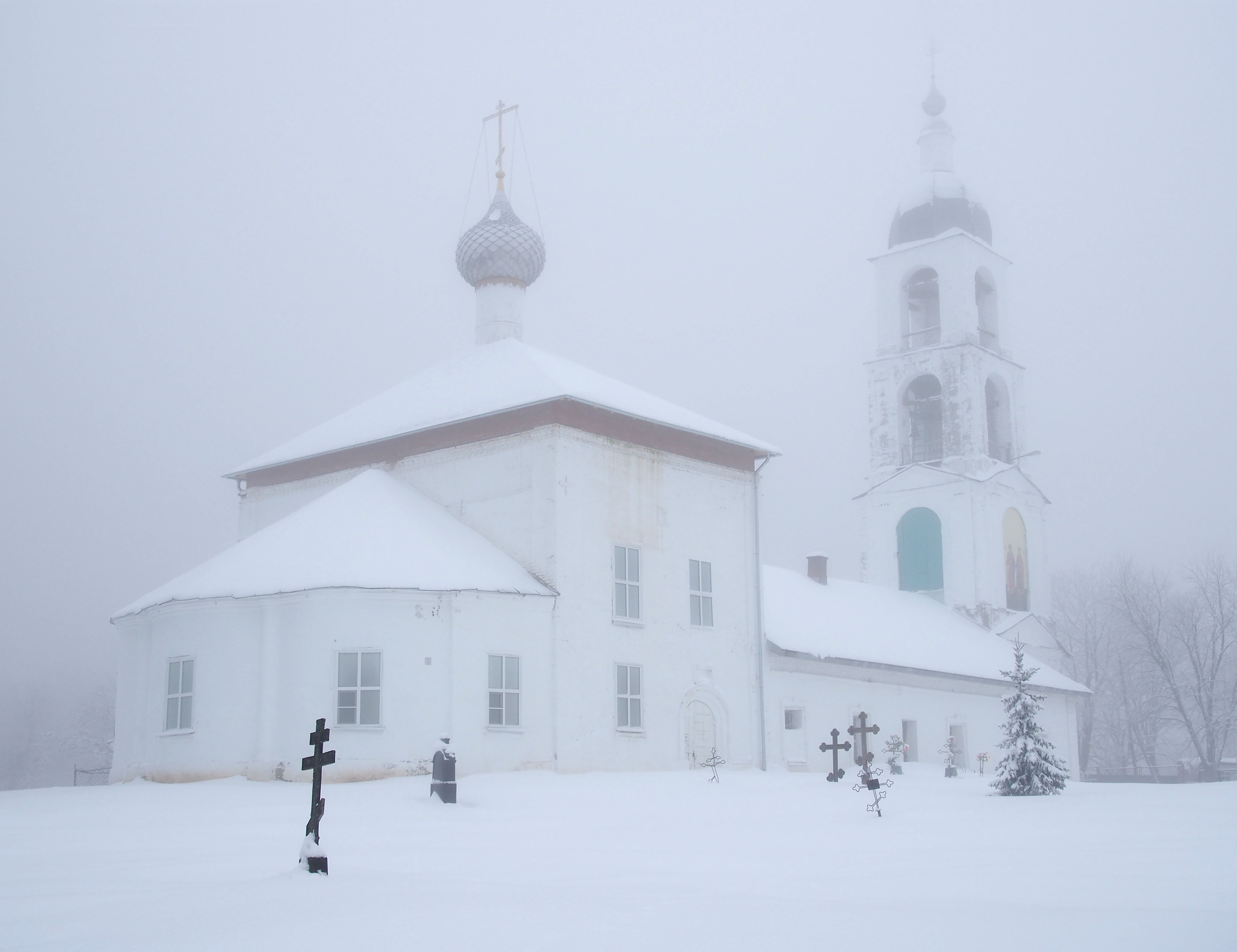
- Church of Elijah the Prophet in Tutayevsky District

- Coat of arms
- Location of Tutayevsky District in Yaroslavl Oblast
- Coordinates: 57°53′N 39°33′E
- Country: Russia
- Federal subject: Yaroslavl Oblast
- Established: 1929
- Administrative center: Tutayev

Area
  - Total: 1,444 km^{2} (558 sq mi)

Population (2010 Census)
  - Total: 15,949
  - Estimate (2018): 56,112 (+251.8%)
  - Density: 11.05/km^{2} (28.61/sq mi)
  - Urban: 35.2%
  - Rural: 64.8%

Administrative structure
  - Administrative divisions: 1 Work settlements, 10 Rural okrugs
  - Inhabited localities: 1 urban-type settlements, 332 rural localities

Municipal structure
  - Municipally incorporated as: Tutayevsky Municipal District
  - Municipal divisions: 1 urban settlements, 4 rural settlements
- Time zone: UTC+3 (MSK)
- OKTMO ID: 78643000
- Website: http://www.tutaev.ru/

Tutayevsky District (Russian: Тутáевский райо́н) is an administrative and municipal district (raion), one of the seventeen in Yaroslavl Oblast, Russia. It is located in the northern central part of the oblast. The area of the district is 1,444 square kilometers (558 sq mi). Its administrative center is the town of Tutayev (which is not administratively a part of the district). Population: 15,949 (2010 Census); 17,131 (2002 census); 19,575 (1989 Soviet census).

== Administrative and municipal status ==
Within the framework of administrative divisions, Tutayevsky District is one of the seventeen in the oblast. The town of Tutayev serves as its administrative center, despite being incorporated separately as a town of oblast significance—an administrative unit with the status equal to that of the districts.

As a municipal division, the district is incorporated as Tutayevsky Municipal District, with the town of oblast significance of Tutayev being incorporated within it as Tutayev Urban Settlement.
