= Yaroslavsky District, Yaroslavl Oblast =

Yaroslavsky District Ярославский район (Russian)
- District
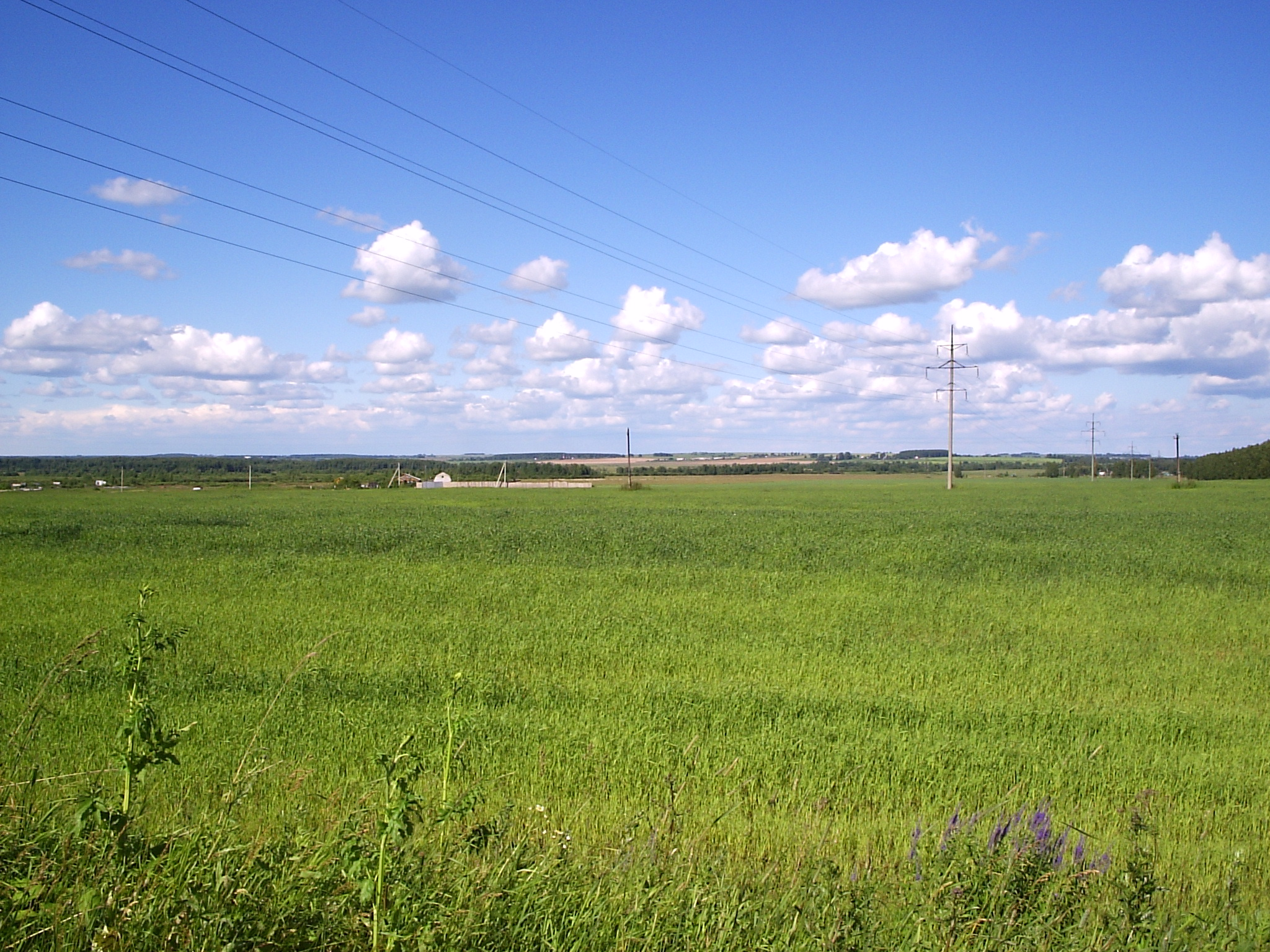
- Landscape near the settlement of Zavolzhye in Yaroslavsky District

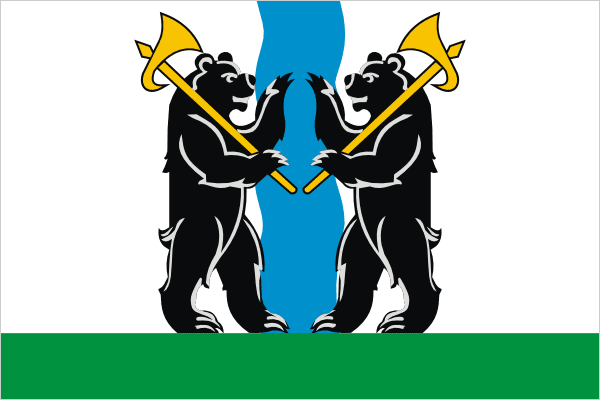
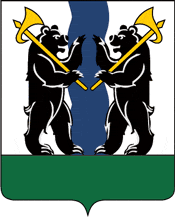
- Flag Coat of arms
- Location of Yaroslavsky District in Yaroslavl Oblast
- Coordinates: 57°37′N 39°51′E
- Country: Russia
- Federal subject: Yaroslavl Oblast
- Established: 1929
- Administrative center: Yaroslavl

Area
  - Total: 1,936.7 km^{2} (747.8 sq mi)

Population (2010 Census)
  - Total: 52,328
  - Estimate (2018): 63,574 (+21.5%)
  - Density: 27.019/km^{2} (69.979/sq mi)
  - Urban: 13.2%
  - Rural: 87.8%

Administrative structure
  - Administrative divisions: 2 Work settlements, 19 Rural okrugs
  - Inhabited localities: 2 urban-type settlements, 577 rural localities

Municipal structure
  - Municipally incorporated as: Yaroslavsky Municipal District
  - Municipal divisions: 1 urban settlements, 7 rural settlements
- Time zone: UTC+3 (MSK)
- OKTMO ID: 78650000
- Website: https://yamo.adm.yar.ru/

Yaroslavsky District (Russian: Яросла́вский райо́н) is an administrative and municipal district (raion), one of the seventeen in Yaroslavl Oblast, Russia. It is located in the east of the oblast. The area of the district is 1,936.7 square kilometers (747.8 sq mi). Its administrative center is the city of Yaroslavl (which is not administratively a part of the district). Population: 52,328 (2010 Census); 53,579 (2002 census); 55,636 (1989 Soviet census).

== Administrative and municipal status ==
Within the framework of administrative divisions, Yaroslavsky District is one of the seventeen in the oblast. The city of Yaroslavl serves as its administrative center, despite being incorporated separately as a city of oblast significance—an administrative unit with the status equal to that of the districts.

As a municipal division, the district is incorporated as Yaroslavsky Municipal District. The city of oblast significance of Yaroslavl is incorporated separately from the district as Yaroslavl Urban Okrug.
