= Pereslavsky District =

Pereslavsky District Переславский район (Russian)
- District
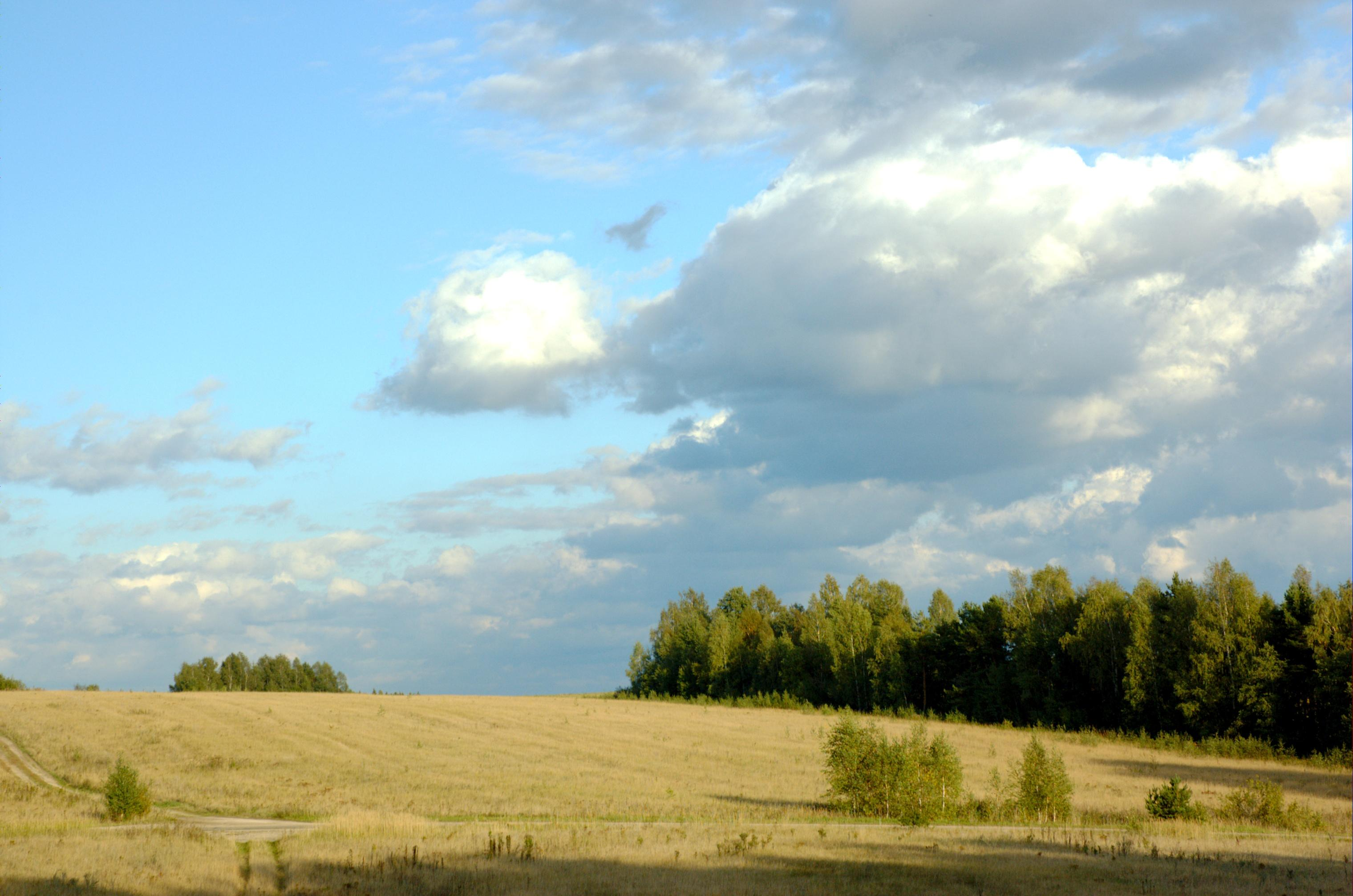
- Landscape near the village of Rushinovo in Pereslavsky District

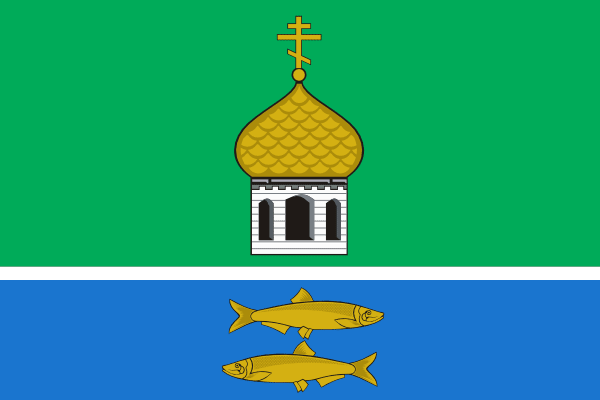
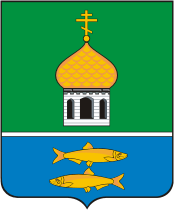
- Flag Coat of arms
- Location of Pereslavsky District in Yaroslavl Oblast
- Coordinates: 56°44′N 38°51′E
- Country: Russia
- Federal subject: Yaroslavl Oblast
- Established: 10 June 1929
- Administrative center: Pereslavl-Zalessky

Area
  - Total: 3,130 km^{2} (1,210 sq mi)

Population (2010 Census)
  - Total: 20,352
  - Estimate (2018): 20,076 (−1.4%)
  - Density: 6.50/km^{2} (16.8/sq mi)
  - Urban: 0%
  - Rural: 100%

Administrative structure
  - Administrative divisions: 21 Rural okrugs
  - Inhabited localities: 307 rural localities

Municipal structure
  - Municipally incorporated as: Pereslavsky Municipal District
  - Municipal divisions: 0 urban settlements, 3 rural settlements
- Website: http://pereslavl-rayon.ru/

Pereslavsky District (Russian: Пересла́вский райо́н) is an administrative and municipal district (raion), one of the seventeen in Yaroslavl Oblast, Russia. It is located in the south of the oblast. The area of the district is 3,130 square kilometers (1,210 sq mi). Its administrative center is the town of Pereslavl-Zalessky (which is not administratively a part of the district). Population: 20,352 (2010 Census); 22,576 (2002 census); 27,971 (1989 Soviet census).

== Administrative and municipal status ==
Within the framework of administrative divisions, Pereslavsky District is one of the seventeen in the oblast. The town of Pereslavl-Zalessky serves as its administrative center, despite being incorporated separately as a town of oblast significance—an administrative unit with the status equal to that of the districts.

As a municipal division, the district is incorporated as Pereslavsky Municipal District. The town of oblast significance of Pereslavl-Zalessky is incorporated separately from the district as Pereslavl-Zalessky Urban Okrug.
