= Nekrasovsky District =

Nekrasovsky District Некрасовский район (Russian)
- District
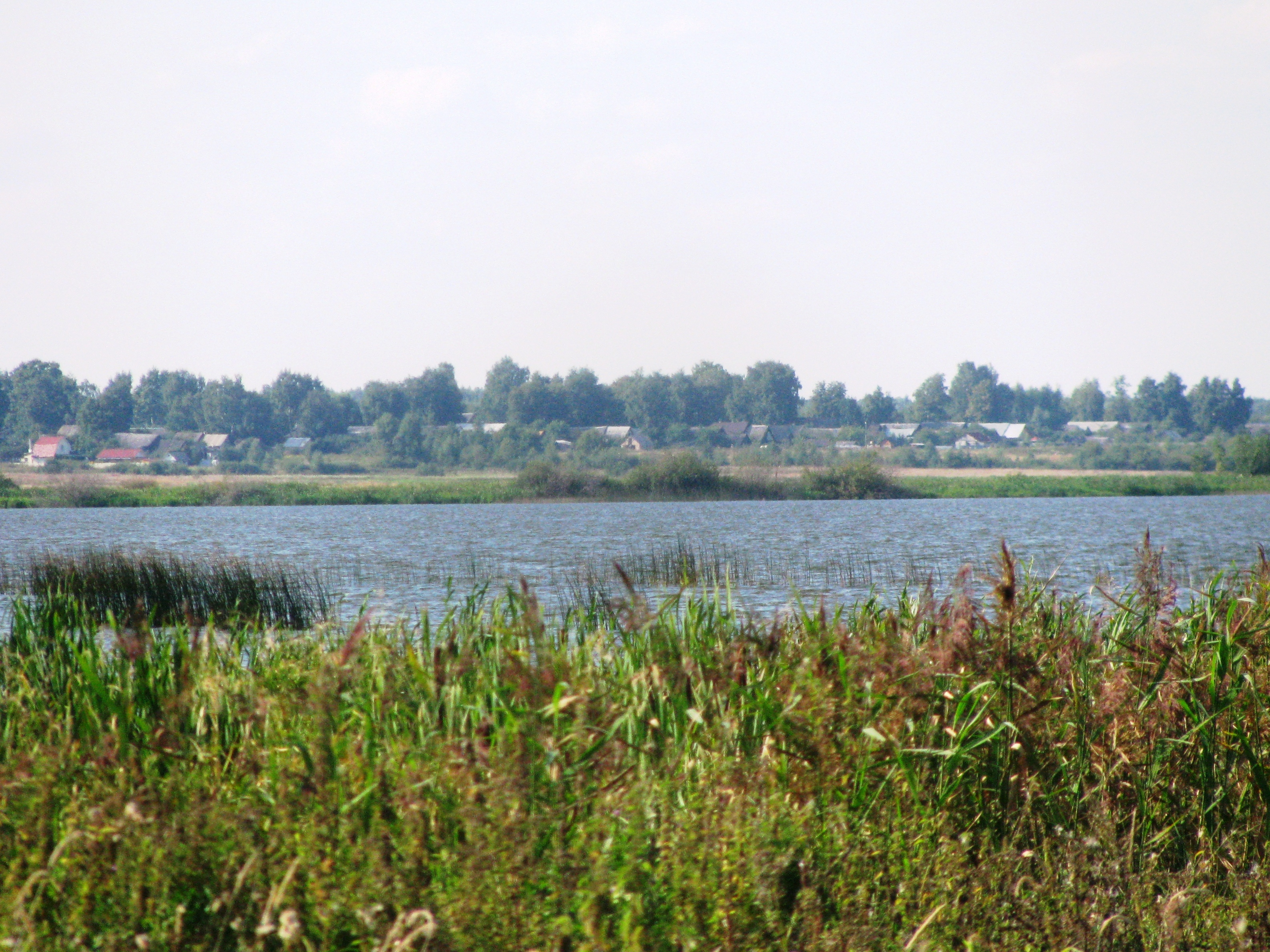
- Lake Yakhrobolskoye in Nekrasovsky District

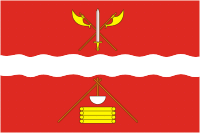
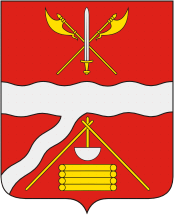
- Flag Coat of arms
- Location of Nekrasovsky District in Yaroslavl Oblast
- Coordinates: 57°41′01″N 40°22′26″E
- Country: Russia
- Federal subject: Yaroslavl Oblast
- Established: 10 June 1929
- Administrative center: Nekrasovskoye

Area
  - Total: 1,380 km^{2} (530 sq mi)

Population (2010 Census)
  - Total: 21,573
  - Estimate (2018): 19,196 (−11%)
  - Density: 15.6/km^{2} (40.5/sq mi)
  - Urban: 48.0%
  - Rural: 52.0%

Administrative structure
  - Administrative divisions: 3 Work settlements, 14 Rural okrugs
  - Inhabited localities: 3 urban-type settlements, 296 rural localities

Municipal structure
  - Municipally incorporated as: Nekrasovsky Municipal District
  - Municipal divisions: 0 urban settlements, 3 rural settlements
- Time zone: UTC+3 (MSK)
- OKTMO ID: 78626000
- Website: http://nekrasovskoe.yarregion.ru/

Nekrasovsky District (Russian: Некра́совский райо́н) is an administrative and municipal district (raion), one of the seventeen in Yaroslavl Oblast, Russia. It is located in the east of the oblast. The area of the district is 1,380 square kilometers (530 sq mi). Its administrative center is the urban locality (a work settlement) of Nekrasovskoye. Population: 21,573 (2010 Census); 24,487 (2002 census); 28,238 (1989 Soviet census). The population of Nekrasovskoye accounts for 28.5% of the district's total population.
