= Rostovsky District =

Rostovsky District Ростовский район (Russian)
- District
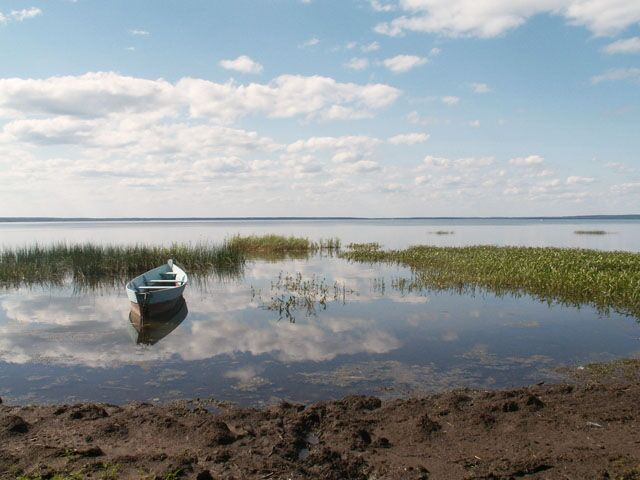
- Lake Nero, a protected area of Russia in Rostovsky District

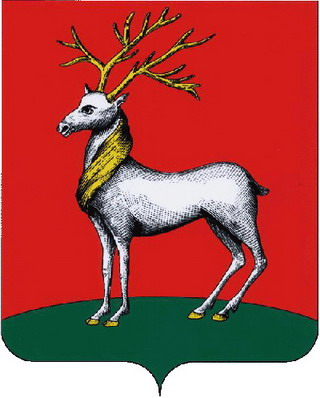
- Flag Coat of arms
- Location of Rostovsky District in Yaroslavl Oblast
- Coordinates: 57°11′N 39°25′E
- Country: Russia
- Federal subject: Yaroslavl Oblast
- Established: 10 June 1929
- Administrative center: Rostov

Area
  - Total: 2,081.82 km^{2} (803.80 sq mi)

Population (2010 Census)
  - Total: 34,062
  - Estimate (2018): 63,640 (+86.8%)
  - Density: 16.362/km^{2} (42.376/sq mi)
  - Urban: 49.4%
  - Rural: 50.6%

Administrative structure
  - Administrative divisions: 4 Work settlements, 17 Rural okrugs
  - Inhabited localities: 4 urban-type settlements, 303 rural localities

Municipal structure
  - Municipally incorporated as: Rostovsky Municipal District
  - Municipal divisions: 1 urban settlements, 4 rural settlements
- Time zone: UTC+3 (MSK)
- OKTMO ID: 78637000
- Website: http://www.admrostov.ru

Population of Rostovsky District
- 2010 Census: 34,062
- 2002 Census: 38,593
- 1989 Census: 43,047
- 1979 Census: 41,671

Rostovsky District (Russian: Росто́вский райо́н) is an administrative and municipal district (raion), one of the seventeen in Yaroslavl Oblast, Russia. It is located in the southeast of the oblast. The area of the district is 2,081.82 square kilometers (803.80 sq mi). Its administrative center is the town of Rostov (which is not administratively a part of the district). As of the 2010 Census, the total population of the district was 34,062.

== Administrative and municipal status ==
Within the framework of administrative divisions, Rostovsky District is one of the seventeen in the oblast. The town of Rostov serves as its administrative center, despite being incorporated separately as a town of oblast significance—an administrative unit with the status equal to that of the districts.

As a municipal division, the district is incorporated as Rostovsky Municipal District, with the town of oblast significance of Rostov being incorporated within it as Rostov Urban Settlement.
