= Yaroslavl Oblast =

First-level administrative division of Russia

Yaroslavl Oblast Ярославская область (Russian)
- Oblast
- Flag Coat of arms

- Coordinates: 57°52′N 39°12′E
- Country: Russia
- Federal district: Central
- Economic region: Central
- Established: 11 March 1936
- Administrative center: Yaroslavl

Government
  - Body: Oblast Duma
  - Governor: Mikhail Yevrayev

Area
  - Total: 36,177 km^{2} (13,968 sq mi)
  - Rank: 60th

Population (2021 census)
  - Total: 1,209,811
  - Estimate (2018): 1,265,684
  - Rank: 37th
  - Density: 33.441/km^{2} (86.613/sq mi)
  - Urban: 81.1%
  - Rural: 18.9%

GDP (nominal, 2024)
  - Total: ₽1.03 trillion (US$12.06 billion)
  - Per capita: ₽868,435 (US$10,190.39)
- Time zone: UTC+3 (MSK)
- ISO 3166 code: RU-YAR
- License plates: 76
- OKTMO ID: 78000000
- Official languages: Russian
- Website: http://www.adm.yar.ru

small coat of arms of Yaroslavl Oblast

Yaroslavl Oblast (Note: Russian: Ярославская область, romanized: Yaroslavskaya oblast', IPA: [jɪrɐˈsɫafskəjə ˈobɫəsʲtʲ]) is a federal subject of Russia (an oblast), which is located in the Central Federal District, surrounded by the Tver, Moscow, Ivanovo, Vladimir, Kostroma, and Vologda oblasts.

This geographic location gives the oblast the advantages of proximity to Moscow and Saint Petersburg. Additionally, the city of Yaroslavl, the administrative center of the oblast, is served by major highways, railroads, and waterways. The population of the oblast was 1,272,468 as of the 2010 Census.

== Geography ==
The climate of Yaroslavl Oblast is temperate continental; there are four clearly established seasons and most of the precipitation falls as showers during the warm half of the year. Winters are cold and snowy winters, and summers are quite warm. The coldest month is January, when the average temperature is about −8.2 °C (17.2 °F), while the warmest is July when the average temperature is +18.9 °C (66.0 °F).

Formerly almost all territory was covered with thick conifer forest (fir, pine). After much of this was harvested, now a large portion of territory has been replaced by second-growth birch-and-aspen forests and crop fields. Swamps also take up considerable areas.

Large animals have been much reduced in numbers, but there are still some bears, wolves, foxes, moose, and wild boars. A great number of wild birds live and nest in the oblast. In cities, the most common birds are pigeons, jackdaws, hooded crows, rooks, house sparrows, and great tits.

The oblast is bordered by Vologda Oblast to the north, Kostroma Oblast and Ivanovo Oblast to the east, Vladimir Oblast to the south and Moscow Oblast and Tver Oblast to the west.

The Volga River flows through Yaroslavl Oblast; major dams and hydroelectric stations were built at Uglich and Rybinsk. The Rybinsk Reservoir, filled between 1941 and 1947, is one of the largest in Europe. As it was filled the former town of Mologa and several hundreds of villages were flooded. Some 150,000 people in Yaroslavl, Vologda, and Kalinin (now Tver) oblasts had to be relocated in connection with this project.

Mineral resources are limited to construction materials (such as sand, gravel, clay) and peat. There are also mineral water springs and wells.

== History ==
People first settled in the area of the modern-day Yaroslavl Oblast during the Paleolithic Era at the end of the last glacial period. The Fatyanovo–Balanovo culture is believed to have introduced agriculture in the region not later than the beginning of the 2nd millennium BC. The earliest historically documented inhabitants of the Yaroslavl region were the Volga Finnic Merya people. They were known to come into close contact with Balto-Slavic tribes of Krivichs and Slovens from the 9th to the 10th centuries AD; they eventually blended into a single cultural community with other people of the Kievan Rus'.

=== Early medieval Rus' ===
The oblast has belonged to the core of the Russian lands since the early Middle Ages. Rostov, the oldest city in the region, was first mentioned in records in 862 A.D. It soon became the main political and religious centers of the Northeast Kievan Rus'. (The Rostov eparchy established in 991 was one of the earliest in Russia.) Many notable Rurikid princes had their fief in Rostov: among them were St. Boris and Yaroslav the Wise, the founder of the city of Yaroslavl.

In 1054 Rostov and other North-Eastern lands were inherited by Yaroslav's son Vsevolod, who also ruled the southern Principality of Pereyaslavl. Remaining in their distant capital, the princes of Pereyaslavl ruled the province through their viceregents. In that period the 1071 smerd rebellion was led by still powerful magi of Yarsolavl, during which bishop Leontius of Rostov was murdered.

In the early 12th century, Rostov got its own prince, Yuri Dolgoruky, the grandson of Vsevolod. He moved his capital to Suzdal in 1125, diminishing the influence of Rostov. During his reign, Dolgoruky founded many major cities of the Northeast Rus, including Pereslavl, Uglich, and Romanov of the modern-day Yaroslavl Oblast. Prince Andrey Bogolyubsky, who succeeded his father Yury as a ruler of the Rostov-Suzdal lands in 1157, was the first Russian ruler to give up his claims for the thrones of Kiev and Pereyaslavl. He proclaimed himself a Grand Prince and moved his capital to the city of Vladimir, near Suzdal, marking the beginning of the Vladimir-Suzdal Principality.

After the death of Andrey's brother Vsevolod the Big Nest in 1212, the Russian North-East suffered a period of feudal fragmentation. Rostov, Yaroslavl, Pereslavl and Uglich became principalities in their own right, while their princes still recognized the formal suzerainty of the Grand Princes of Vladimir.

=== Tatar Yoke era ===
Northeastern Rus was attacked by the Mongol-Tatar armies in the winter of 1238. Pereslavl struggled against the attack for five days, losing most of its population. Rostov and Uglich both fell without a fight. Grand Prince Yuri II of Vladimir was killed, along with his nephews, princes of Rostov and Yaroslavl, in the Battle of the Sit River in the northern part of the region. As a result of the invasion, the Vladimir-Suzdal domain was obliged to pay tribute to the conquerors and submit to their political will.

During the 13th and 14th centuries, Rostov and Yaroslavl principalities continued to split up and weaken. They became easy targets for other, more powerful princes, most importantly the House of Moscow. In 1302 Ivan of Pereslavl bequeathed his principality to Daniel of Moscow. In 1328 Ivan I of Moscow bought out the Uglich principality. Starting with 1332, Muscovites began to acquire parts of the Rostov Principality little by little, completely subduing it by the middle of the 15th century. In 1380 soldiers of the Rostov and Yaroslavl principalities joined the allied army of Moscow prince Dmitry Donskoy in the Battle of Kulikovo.

Ivan III the Great completed the gathering of the Russian lands in the Yaroslavl Oblast. In 1463 he forced the last prince of Yaroslavl, Alexander Bryukhaty, to sell all of his possessions. In 1474 Ivan III bought the rest of the territories that were still co-owned with Moscow by the House of Rostov.

=== Tsardom of Russia ===
In the 16th century Yaroslavl became a major trade center, connecting Central Russia with the lower regions of Volga, as well as Arkhangelsk, the main trading outpost of the British Muscovy Company. At the same time Rostov continued as a center of the richest and one of the most influential eparchies of the Russian Orthodox Church. Rostov archbishops were granted a metropolitan status in 1589.

During the Time of Troubles of the early 17th century, Rostov and Yaroslavl provinces were raided by the rebel forces of False Dmitry II and his Polish–Lithuanian allies. From 1609 to 1610 the invaders were driven out by a Russian militia of Gagarin and Vysheslavtsev, who gathered their forces in Vologda. In late 1614, the northern part of the region (Poshekhonye) was terrorized by a rogue cossack unit led by ataman Baloven. The next year surrounding areas of Uglich and Romanov were reached by the notorious Polish–Lithuanian Lisowczycy raiders. In 1618 Zaporozhian Cossacks of hetman Sahaidachny captured Yaroslavl, Pereslavl and Romanov, as allies with a Polish invasion of Russia.

Later in the 17th century, Yaroslavl's commercial growth made it more important than ever. By the middle of the century, it was the second-biggest Russian city, with population of 15,000 people. Starting in 1692, Pereslavl and Rostov were finally subjected to Yaroslavl. In 1719, after a new administrative reform, territories of the modern oblast were divided between the Yaroslavl and Uglich provinces of the Saint Petersburg Governorate, and the Pereslavl and Kostroma provinces of the Moscow Governorate. In 1727 Yaroslavl and Uglich were also taken over by Moscow.

=== Russian Empire ===
After the foundation of Saint Petersburg and a subsequent decline of the northern trading routes, Yaroslav lost its role as a major trade center and second-most important Russian city. The city continued to be integral to development of its region and industrial growth. In 1718 the first public elementary school was established in Yaroslavl; in 1747 Spaso-Preobrazhensky monastery opened a seminary. In 1750 young Yaroslavl socialite Fyodor Volkov organized the first permanent theater in Russia.

In 1777 a separate Yaroslavl Governorate (then viceroyalty) was established; it included surrounding areas of Yaroslavl, Rostov and Uglich. As a part of the reform, many settlements of the region were granted town status, namely Rybinsk, Poshekhonye, Myshkin and Mologa. The archbishop of Rostov moved his permanent residence from Rostov to Yaroslavl. In 1803 Pavel Demidov founded the Yaroslavl School of Higher Studies, the first university college in the governorate.

From the 18th century, Rostov became widely known for its finift-enamel jewelry crafts. In 1850 the first Russian tobacco factory, Balkanskaya Zvezda, was opened in Yaroslavl. Railroads were constructed and connected the Yaroslavl region with Moscow in 1870 and Vologda in 1872. In 1879 Dmitri Mendeleev helped to create the first oil refinery in the empire near Romanov-Borisoglebsk. During the 1910s the region began to develop as a major center of the burgeoning automotive industry: in 1916 new factories were founded in Rybinsk (Russky Renault) and Yaroslavl (Lebedev Automobile Factory).

=== Soviet years ===
After the Russian Revolution and Civil War, Soviet power in the Yaroslavl Governorate was installed in a relatively peaceful way. The Yaroslavl and Rybinsk revolts of July 1918 had been organized by Boris Savinkov's Union for the Defense of the Motherland and Freedom. In Rybinsk, Cheka aided by the Red Army dealt with the rebels in one day, but in Yaroslavl the clashes continued for two weeks. To put the Yaroslavl rebels down, the Reds used their artillery and aviation. Both sides lost more than a thousand people during those events, and thousands of Yaroslavl families lost their homes in the subsequent fires. Although the revolts were unsuccessful, they drew a significant part of Bolshevik forces to Central Russia. In that period, the opposition Whites captured Yekaterinburg, Simbirsk, and Kazan.

From 1921 to 1923, the northern part of the governorate became a separate Rybinsk Governorate; it was later returned to Yaroslavl jurisdiction. In 1929, the region was split between Yaroslavl and Rybinsk okrugs, which became a part of the newly established Ivanovo Industrial Oblast.

Yaroslavl Oblast was created on 11 March 1936, and it included most of the former Yaroslavl Governorate, together with a big par itself, and Pereslavl-Zalessky of the Vladimir Governorate. In 1944, the Yaroslavl Oblast gained its current borders after the Kostroma Oblast was organized as a separate region.

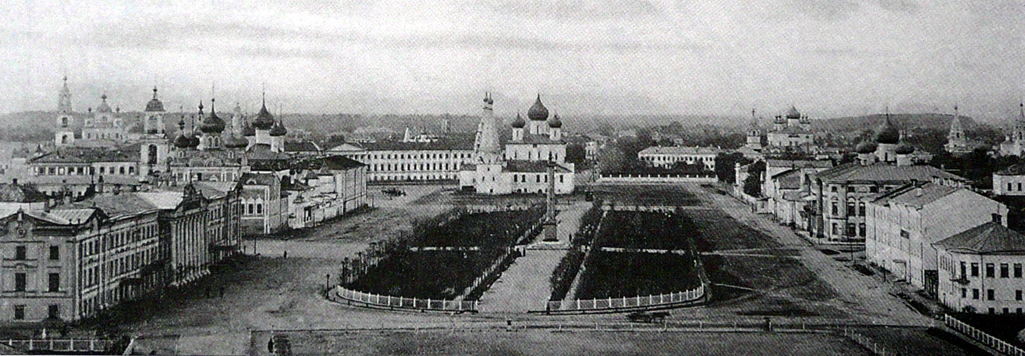
Ilyinskaya square in Yaroslavl

During the 1930s under Josef Stalin, the Yaroslavl Oblast went through rapid forced industrialization under the first five year plans. In 1935, construction of the Rybinsk dam began; it was followed by creation of the Rybinsk Reservoir, the largest man-made body of water on Earth at that time, which inundated the entire former city of Mologa. Some 150,000 people had to be relocated from the city and other villages that were flooded by filling the reservoir.

By the early 1940s, the oblast had become one of the most industrialized regions of Russia. Its biggest economic centers were Yaroslavl (53% of the industrial output), Rybinsk (17%), and Kostroma (11%). Economic growth was accompanied with social and cultural development. A number of higher education institutes, theaters, and a philharmonia were founded in Yaroslavl and Rybinsk. The region was also significantly affected by the political repressions of that time and Stalin's purges. During the period from 1918 to 1975, some 18,155 people were given sentences for political crimes, and 2,219 were sentenced to death.

Although this was a rear region in the course of World War II, the Yaroslavl Oblast was in danger of invasion by Nazi Germany. Many regional manufacturers were relocated eastwards, and two strong lines of defense were constructed in late 1941. Out of 500,000 residents of the oblast sent to fight on the front lines, 200,000 (1/10 of the entire population) never returned and were presumed dead.

Soon after the end of the war, the oblast and national government completed such projects as construction of the Rybinsk Hydroelectric Power Station and establishing new industries. From the late 1960s, the local Poshekhonye brand of cheese received recognition throughout Russia. In 1979, Yarslavl started to host what is now the oldest jazz festival in Russia, Jazz Nad Volgoi ('Jazz on the Volga').

=== Modern history ===
On 30 October 1997, Yaroslavl, alongside Astrakhan, Kirov, Murmansk, and Ulyanovsk signed a power-sharing agreement with the government of Russia; it and the other oblasts gained autonomy. After the dissolution of the Soviet Union, Russia abolished this agreement on 15 March 2002.

== Politics ==
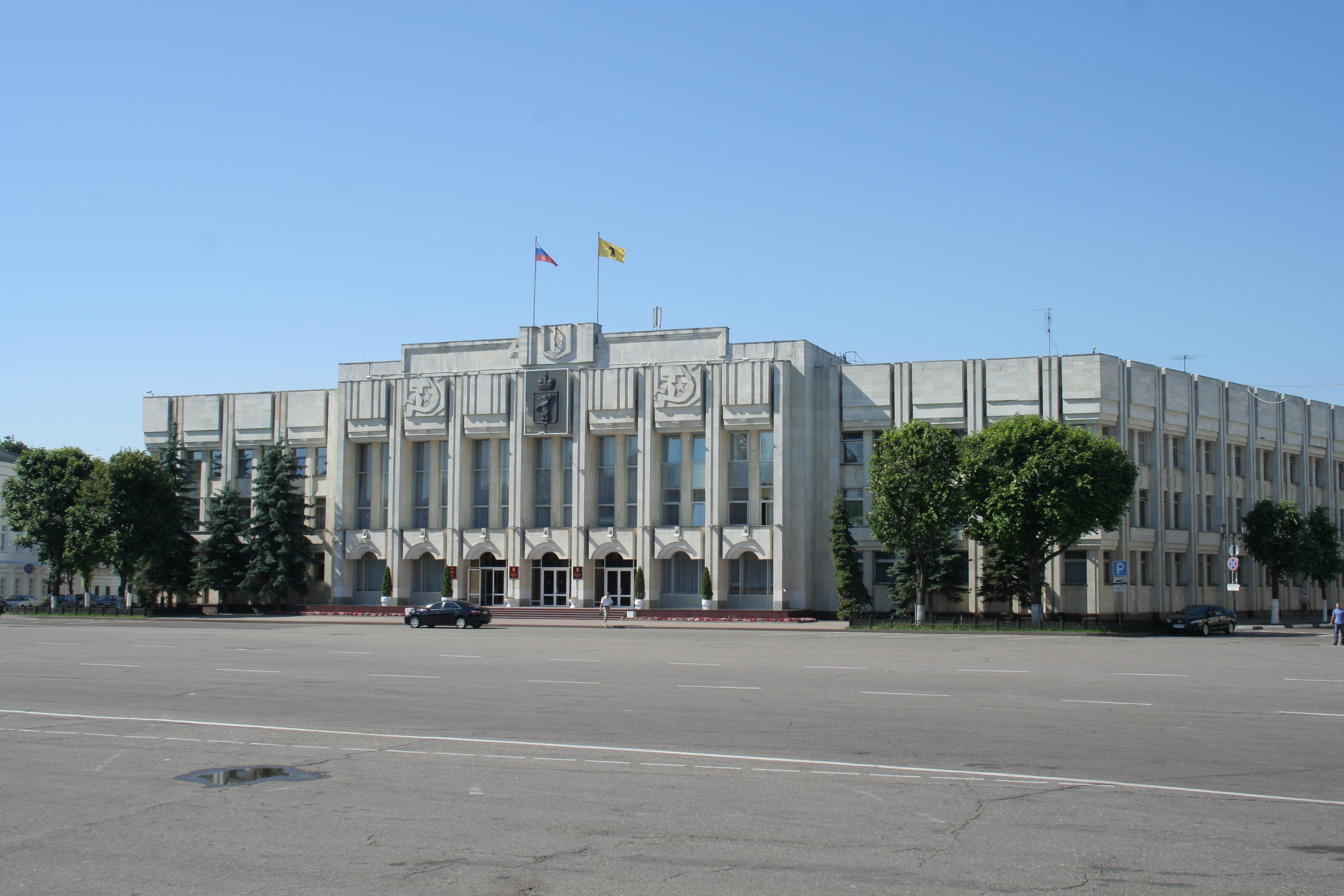
Seat of the Oblast government in Sovetskaya Square

During the Soviet period, the high authority in the oblast was shared among three persons: The first secretary of the Yaroslavl CPSU Committee (who in reality had the biggest authority), the chairman of the oblast Soviet (legislative power), and the Chairman of the oblast Executive Committee (executive power). Since 1991, CPSU lost this predominant power. The head of the Oblast administration, and eventually the governor, were appointed/elected alongside the members of the elected regional parliament.

In the 21st century, the Charter of Yaroslavl Oblast is the fundamental law of the region. The Yaroslavl Oblast Duma is the province's standing legislative (representative) body. The Legislative Assembly passes laws, resolutions, and other legal acts and supervises the implementation and observance of such acts. The highest executive body is the Oblast Government, which includes territorial executive bodies, such as district administrations, committees, and commissions that facilitate development and run the day-to-day matters of the province. The Oblast administration supports the activities of the Governor, who is the highest official, and acts as guarantor of the observance of the oblast Charter in accordance with the Constitution of Russia.

== Demographics ==
Population: 1,209,811 (2021 census); 1,272,468 (2010 census); 1,367,398 (2002 census); 1,470,357 (1989 Soviet census).

Vital statistics for 2024:

- Births: 8,471 (7.2 per 1,000)
- Deaths: 18,265 (15.4 per 1,000)

Total fertility rate (2024):
1.27 children per woman

Life expectancy (2021):
Total — 69.07 years (male — 63.78, female — 74.25)

=== Settlements ===
Largest cities or towns in Yaroslavl Oblast 2010 Russian Census
Rank		Administrative Division	Pop.
1	Yaroslavl	Yaroslavsky District	591,486
2	Rybinsk	Rybinsky District	200,771
3	Pereslavl-Zalessky	Pereslavsky District	41,925
4	Tutayev	Tutayevsky District	41,005
5	Uglich	Uglichsky District	34,507
6	Rostov	Rostovsky District	31,792
7	Gavrilov-Yam	Gavrilov-Yamsky District	17,791
8	Danilov	Danilovsky District	15,861
9	Semibratovo	Rostovsky District	7,097
10	Nekrasovskoye	Nekrasovsky District	6,154

=== Ethnic composition ===
Historical population
Year	Pop.	±%
1897	1,071,355	—
1926	1,343,163	+25.4%
1959	1,395,627	+3.9%
1970	1,400,224	+0.3%
1979	1,424,806	+1.8%
1989	1,470,357	+3.2%
2002	1,367,398	−7.0%
2010	1,272,468	−6.9%
2021	1,209,811	−4.9%
2024	1,187,558	−1.8%
Source: Census data

Population (2010)
Russians – 96%
Ukrainians – 0.8%
Armenians – 0.6%
Azerbaijanis – 0.4%
Tatars – 0.4%
Yazidis – 0.3%
Belarusians – 0.2%
Others – 1.3%

There were 51,001 people registered from administrative databases, and could not declare an ethnicity. It is estimated that the proportion of ethnicities in this group is the same as that of the declared group.

Life expectancy:

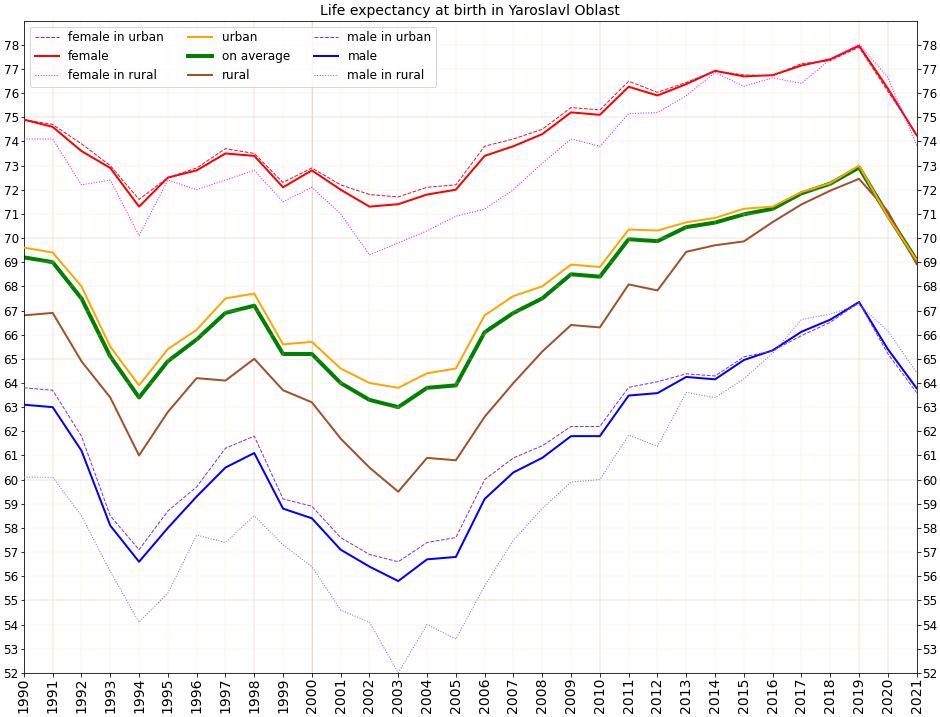
Life expectancy at birth in Yaroslavl Oblast

According to Rosstat.

	2019	2021
Average:	72.9 years	69.1 years
Male:	67.4 years	63.8 years
Female:	78.0 years	74.3 years

=== Religion ===
Religion in Yaroslavl Oblast as of 2012 (Sreda Arena Atlas)
Russian Orthodoxy	32.6%
Other Orthodox	1.7%
Other Christians	4.9%
Islam	0.7%
Spiritual but not religious	33.9%
Atheism and irreligion	14.6%
Other and undeclared	11.6%

Christianity is the largest religion in Yaroslavl Oblast. According to a 2012 survey 32.6% of the population of Yaroslavl Oblast adheres to the Russian Orthodox Church, 5% are unaffiliated generic Christians, 2% are Eastern Orthodox Christians who do not belong to church or are members of other (non-Russian) Eastern Orthodox churches, and 1% are Muslims. In addition, 34% of the population declares to be "spiritual but not religious", 15% is atheist, and 10.4% follows other religions or did not give an answer to the question.

== Economy ==
The engineering and metalworking industry is the region's primary industrial sector, which supplies Russia with a wide variety of products. This industry is actively involved in foreign economic relations with CIS and other foreign countries.

Agriculture in the Oblast is mainly concerned with growing potatoes, vegetables, and flax, raising beef and dairy cattle, pigs, and sheep and fishing (on the Rybinskoe Reservoir).

=== Natural resources ===
Yaroslavl Oblast's greatest natural resources are water and forests. This part of Russia has enormous water reserves; Yaroslavl Oblast has 4327 rivers with a total length of nearly 20,000 km. There are also 83 lakes with total area of nearly 5,000 km2. The largest lakes are Nero Lake in Rostovsky District and Pleshcheyevo Lake in Pereslavsky District. Pleshcheevo, Somino, Vashutinskoe, Chashnikovskoe, Ryumnikovskoe, and Lovetskoe lakes are located in the State Natural History Park. These lakes were formed from melting glaciers about 70,000 years ago. The region's mineral resource base includes brick clay and clay aggregate, gravel and sand-gravel mix, peat, and sapropel.

== See also ==
- List of Chairmen of Yaroslavl Oblast Duma
