= List of rural localities in Yaroslavl Oblast =

Map of Russia with Yaroslavl Oblast highlighted

This is a list of rural localities in Yaroslavl Oblast. Yaroslavl Oblast (Russian: Яросла́вская о́бласть, Yaroslavskaya oblast) is a federal subject of Russia (an oblast), which is located in the Central Federal District, surrounded by Tver, Moscow, Ivanovo, Vladimir, Kostroma, and Vologda Oblasts. This geographic location affords the oblast the advantages of proximity to Moscow and St. Petersburg. Additionally, the administrative center of the oblast—the city of Yaroslavl—is an intersection of major highways, railroads, and waterways. Population: 1,272,468 (2010 Census).

== Locations ==
- Abashevo
- Abbakumtsevo
- Bolshoye Maslennikovo
- Bolshoye Selo
- Breytovo
- Glushitsy
- Greshnevo
- Isanino
- Karabikha
- Labunino
- Nazarovo
- Novy Nekouz
- Petrakovo
- Shurskol
- Vyatskoye

== See also ==
- Lists of rural localities in Russia
