= Sit (river) =

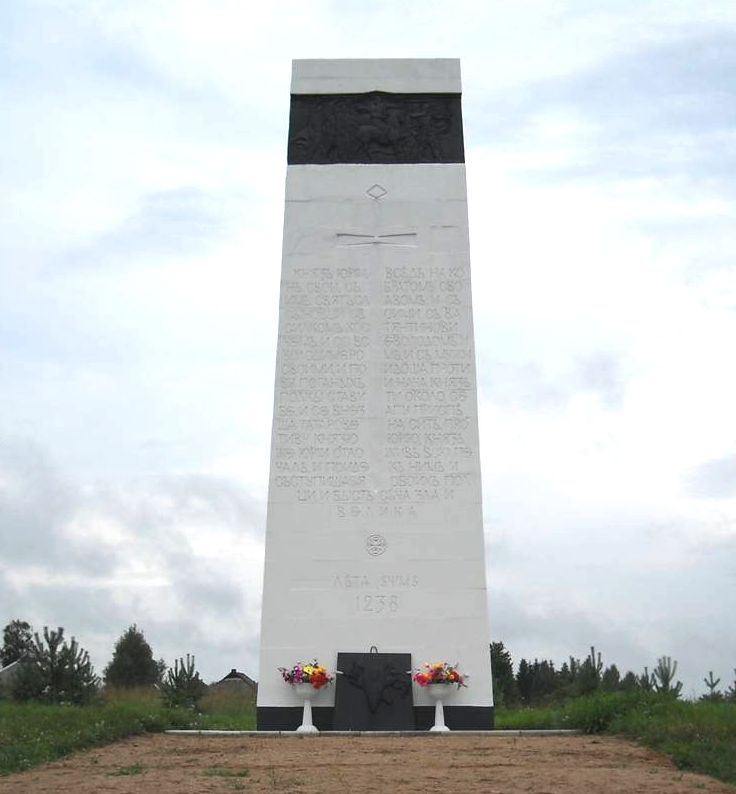
- The memorial on the Sit' battlefield

- Map of the Rybinsk Reservoir basin. The Sit is shown on the map.
- Native name: Сить (Russian)

Location
- Country: Russia

Physical characteristics
- Mouth: Rybinsk Reservoir
  - coordinates: 58°18′41″N 37°52′53″E
- Length: 113 km (70 mi)
- Basin size: 2,370 km^{2} (920 sq mi)

Basin features
- Progression: Rybinsk Reservoir→ Volga→ Caspian Sea

The Sit (Russian: Сить) is a tributary of the Rybinsk Reservoir (nominally, of the Mologa, into which the Sit used to flow before the reservoir was filled). The river flows for 159 kilometres (99 mi) through Sonkovsky District of Tver Oblast and Nekouzsky and Breytovsky Districts of Yaroslavl Oblasts, Russia, before entering the Rybinsk Reservoir near the large village of Breitovo. Its average width varies from 40 to 50 metres (130 to 160 ft). The river mouth is about 1,500 metres (4,900 ft) wide. The drainage basin occupies some 1,900 square kilometres (730 mi^{2}). The river is 159 kilometres (99 mi) long.

== Description ==
The source of the Sit is in the north of Sonkovsky District, close to the village of Saburovo. The river flows northeast, enters Yaroslavl Oblast, and turns south. Near the selo (village) of Voznesenskoye, it turns east and eventually north. The mouth of the Sit is in the selo of Breytovo.

The drainage basin of the Sit includes the eastern part of Krasnokholmsky District of Tver Oblast, the eastern part of Sonkovsky District, the western part of Nekouzsky District, and some areas in Breytovsky District. The district centers Sonkovo and Breytovo lie in the drainage basin of the Sit.

== History ==
The name of the river is associated with the Battle of the Sit River on 4 March 1238. A Mongol army led by Burundai confronted Yuri II of Vladimir on the river, while another army besieged the town of Torzhok, which belonged to Novgorod. The residents of Torzhok surrendered on 5 March, the day after the battle on the river, although the Mongol army failed to follow up on its success by marching to Novgorod. The Mongols left Russia in the summer but returned the following year to continue their campaign.

In the Middle Ages, the valley of the Sit belonged to a branch of the princely house of Yaroslavl. The appanage princes of Sit joined the service of the grand princes of Muscovy in the 15th century. The family survived into the 17th century and was closely related by blood to the Romanovs.

In the early 20th century, the valley of the Sit River was home to the sitskari, an ethnic group of short fair-haired people speaking a northern dialect of the Russian language. It is thought that they had a mixture of Lithuanian or some other Baltic ancestry.
