= Korobeiniki (disambiguation) =

Korobeiniki, nineteenth-century Russian folk song, best known outside Russia as the Tetris theme tune.

Korobeiniki or Korobeyniki may also refer to:

- Plural for Korobeinik, historical Russian travelling peddler
- Korobeiniki (poem), poem by Nekrasov base on which the song was created
- Korobeiniki, 1910 silent film by the poem
- Korobeyniki, Perm Krai, village in Russia
- VIA "Korobeiniki", Russian popular music band (VIA)
