= Korobeinik (surname) =

Korobeinik or Korobeynik is a Russian-language occupational surname, literally meaning the occupation of korobeinik, historical Russian travelling peddler.

Notable people with this surname include:

- Andrei Korobeinik, Estonian computer programmer, entrepreneur, and politician, MP
- Tatiana Korobeinik (Tatyana Korobeynik), Russian rifle shooting sportswoman
- Yuri Korobeinik (1930-2021), Russian professor of mathematics

== See also ==
- Korobeiniki (disambiguation)
- Korobeynikov
