= Korobeynikov =

Korobeynikov or Korobeinikov (Russian: Коробейников, from korobeinik meaning peddler) is a Russian masculine surname, its feminine counterpart is Korobeynikova or Korobeinikova. It may refer to:

- Larisa Korobeynikova (born 1987), Russian fencer
- Mikhail Korobeinikov, Russian anti-communist
- Polina Korobeynikova (born 1996), Russian figure skater
- Trifon Korobeynikov, 16th-century Russian merchant and traveler

== See also ==
- Korobeinik (surname)
