= Natural school =

The natural school (Russian: Натуральная школа, romanized: Naturalnaya shkola) was a literary movement that arose under the influence of Nikolai Gogol in the 1840s up to the 1850s in Russia, and included such diverse authors as Nikolai Nekrasov, Ivan Goncharov, Ivan Turgenev, Mikhail Saltykov-Shchedrin, Ivan Panayev, Dmitry Grigorovich, Alexander Hertzen, Aleksey Pisemsky, Vladimir Dal, Fyodor Dostoyevsky and Evgeny Grebyonka, among others. Modern-day Russian historians of literature use the term only in its historical context, otherwise preferring to speak of "the earliest stage of Social realism in Russia."

== History ==
The label natural school was coined by Faddey Bulgarin, who initially used it in a derogatory sense. In an essay of February 26, 1846, in Severnaya Ptchela, Bulgarin criticized young writers—followers of Gogol—for producing prose that imitated real life but lacked artistry and inspiration. The term was picked up and used in a positive sense by Vissarion Belinsky, in relation to what he saw as the new social realism movement, pioneered by Gogol and now taking hold among the new generation of authors. Analyzing the trend in his essay "On the Russian novel and novels by Gogol" he traced its roots back to 1835. The natural-school doctrine's general idea, as Belinsky saw it, was that literature should "mirror reality." In this respect it was very much a development of French Enlightenment ideas.

The natural-school movement gained ground in 1842–1845 when a group of authors—Nekrasov, Turgenev, Grigorovich, Dal, Grebenka, Panayev (joined later by Dostoyevsky and Saltykov-Shchedrin)—published in Otechestvennye Zapiski, under the ideological guidance of Belinsky. Most of these writers contributed to The Physiology of Saint Petersburg (1845, parts 1 and 2) and the St. Petersburg Collection (1846), two almanacs propagating the quintessential natural-school ideology. The former consisted mostly of so-called 'physiological sketches', a set of essays portraying the life and customs of certain types and groups from among the city's working people and minor officials, as well as outcasts and marginals – a genre born in France in the 1820s and imported into Russia almost wholesale. The latter was more diverse and featured Poor Folk by Dostoyevsky, poems by Nekrasov, Turgenev's short stories and Hertzen's political essays.

Belinsky's Preface to The Physiology of Saint Petersburg is seen in retrospect as a natural-school manifesto. In it the critic wrote of literature's social mission, its "duty not just to reflect life but explore it… examine things, but also pass judgement." "To take away from Art its right to serve social interests means to debase it, stripping off it live thought, that is, its true power," the critic insisted. Belinsky continued to lay out the theoretical basis for his natural-school doctrine in his essays "Replying to Moskvityanin", "Reviewing the Russian Literature of 1846" and "Reviewing the Russian Literature of 1847".

Detractors accused the natural-school authors of negativism, tendentiousness, plagiarizing French authors and lack of patriotism. Dramatist and actor Pyotr Karatygin ridiculed them in his 1847 play Natural School. Despite this, in 1848 (according to Belinsky) the natural school became the dominant trend in Russian literature. After Belinsky's death in the same year, the term natural school was banned by the authorities. In the 1850s it resurfaced under the moniker "the Gogol tradition", as in "Sketches from the Gogol period of Russian Literature" by Chernyshevsky.
