= Russian Women =

Two-poem cycle by Nikolai Nekrasov

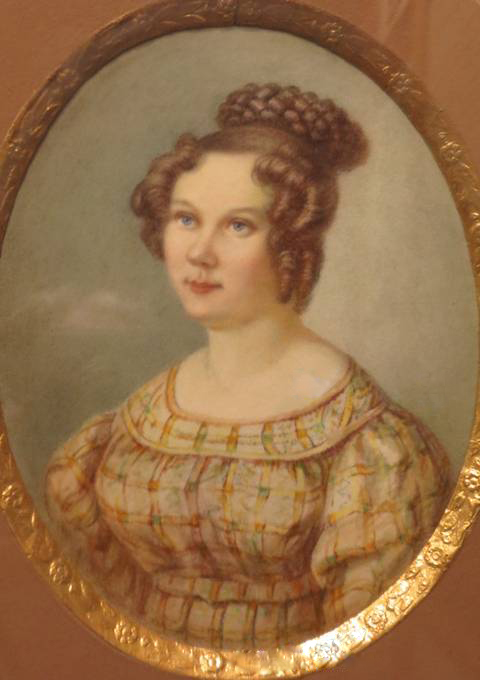
- 1928 portrait of Yekaterina Trubetskaya (nee Catherine Loubrevie de Laval, 1800-1854)
- Author: Nikolai Nekrasov
- Original title: Русские женщины
- Language: Russian
- Publisher: Otechestvennye Zapiski
- Publication date: 1872 (Princess Trubetskaya); 1873 (Princess M.N. Volkonskaya)
- Publication place: Russian Empire
- Media type: Print (hardback & paperback)

Russian Women (Russian: Ру́сские же́нщины, romanized: Russkiye zhenshchiny) is a two-poem cycle by Nikolai Nekrasov, telling the stories of two women, the wives of the Decembrists, who followed their husbands, Sergey Trubetskoy and Sergey Volkonsky, to their exile in Siberia. Part one, Princess Trubetskaya (Княгиня Трубецкая), was written in July 1871; part two, Princess M.N. Volkonskaya (Княгиня М.Н. Волконская, based upon Volkonskaya's memoirs), a year later. Both were published by Otechestvennye Zapiski, in April 1872 and January 1873, respectively, in 'softened', censorship-friendly versions. Both were included into the 1873 Stikhotvoreniya (Стихотворения, Poems) collection, now as a single, two-part work.
