= Greshnevo =

Greshnevo may refer to:

- Greshnevo, Moscow Oblast, a village in Moscow Oblast, Russia
- Greshnevo, Yaroslavl Oblast, a village in Yaroslavl Oblast, Russia
