= The Railway (poem) =

1865 poem by Nikolay Nekrasov

- Author: Nikolai Nekrasov
- Original title: Железная дорога
- Language: Russian
- Genre: Poem
- Publisher: Sovremennik (original version)
- Publication date: 1865
- Publication place: Russia
- Media type: Print (hardback & paperback)

The Railway (Russian: Железная дорога, romanized: Zheleznaya doroga) is a poem by Nikolai Nekrasov written in early 1864. Banned by censors in May and first published on November 24, 1865 in the October issue of Sovremennik, it is regarded as one of the most powerful anti-capitalist statements of 19th-century Russian literature.

== Background ==
The poem is based upon the real history of the construction of the Nikolayevskaya (now Saint Petersburg–Moscow Railway) between 1843 and 1851 by the American engineers Thomas and William Winans under contract with the Tsar who wanted the first railway system in Russia. The workers, most of whom were peasant serfs, were paid the average 3 rubles per month, cheated even out of this by their supervisors and punished by lashes for misconduct. The loss of life among the workers was heavy, the exact number of victims remained unknown, although Nekrasov in his poem mentions five thousand.

Responsible for the project was Count Pyotr Kleinmichel, then the Russia' Transport minister and a ruthless administrator. Hence the short introduction in the form of an epigraph: "Vanya (in cabman's jacket): "Father, who's built this railway?" Father (in a coat with red lining): "Count Pyotr Andreyevich Kleinmikhel, my dear!"

== History ==
Nekrasov wrote the poem in the early 1864. In May of that year he tried to pass it through censorship but failed. Encouraged by the new law, abolishing the preliminary censorship procedures but toughening penalties for the actual publications, he published The Railway in Sovremennik's No.10, 1865, issue. On this very day, November 24, censor Yelenev sent his seniors the report condemning the "reprehensible nature" of the poem. After the Ministry of Press and Publishing Council's special meeting in the end of November, the Minister of Interior Pyotr Valuyev on December 4 gave Sovremennik his second notification bringing the magazine to the brink of closure. In May 1866 the magazine was finally closed, and The Railway was cited as one of its most politically dangerous publications.

== Plot summary ==
Part I

The narrator contemplates the beautiful moonlit autumnal landscapes from his wagon window. The boy travelling in the same compartment with his father asks the latter who the builders of this railway were, and the latter says, Count Kleinmikhel was.

Part II

The narrator imagines how he tells the boy about the real people who'd built this railway. Suddenly the boy is struck by the horrible vision: thousands of ghosts of emaciated, mangled men rise up by the sides of the rails, each trying to tell his story, asking the people of the future if they remember at all those on whose bones they are now travelling.

Part III

The boy tells his father about the vision and of their vis-à-vis maintaining those were the real builders of the railway. The General, outraged, suggests his own line of argument: he's been in Rome, Vienna and Athens and seen there the beautiful creations of man. But have those masterpieces been created by "the common man"? No, common people are but vandals, able only of destroying beauty. He demands that their neighbor should give his son the brighter side of the story.

Part IV

The narrator imagines a rather tongue-in-cheek happy end. The work is over, the dead are buried, and the workers, expecting to be paid, gather at the accountant's office. Here they learn that they actually are indebted to the authorities for having used baths, hospital treatment, et cetera. The contractor arrives and, as a gesture of generosity cancels the workers' debts, rolling out a barrel of wine for everybody to drink and celebrate. The General's reaction to this is not revealed.
