= Korobeiniki (poem) =

1861 poem by Nikolai Nekrasov

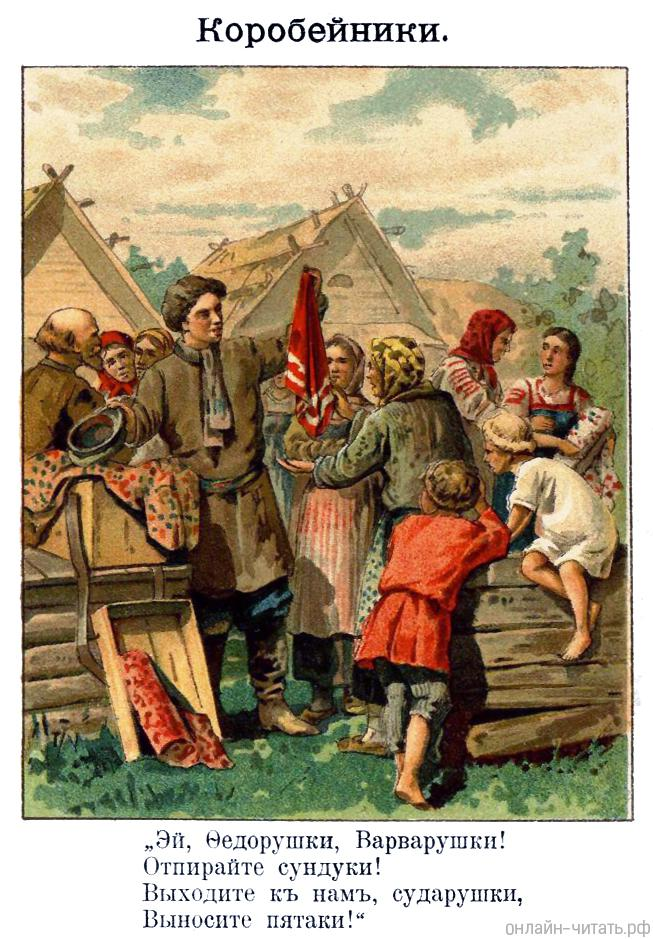
- A 1902 illustration to the poem
- Author: Nikolai Nekrasov
- Original title: Коробейники
- Language: Russian
- Genre: Poem
- Publisher: Sovremennik (original version)
- Publication date: October 1861
- Publication place: Russia
- Original text: Коробейники at Russian Wikisource

"Korobeiniki" (Russian: Коробейники) is a poem written by Nikolai Nekrasov on 23 August 1861 in Greshnevo and published in the October 1861 issue of Sovremennik magazine.

== History ==
In its poetic preamble, Nekrasov dedicated the poem to Gavrila Zakharov, his peasant friend and a regular hunting companion who had prompted him the storyline of the poem. According to the memoirs of Nekrasov's sister Anna Alekseyevna, her brother wrote the poem in his home village, right after returning from a hunting trip. Prior to its appearance in Sovremennik, "Korobeiniki" was published in the Red Books series started by Nekrasov specifically for the peasant readership; these books were distributed by the "ophens", vagrant traders, in the rural areas of Russia.

Soon after "Korobeiniki" was published, Nikolai Chernyshevsky used one of its fragments, "The Song of a Humble Strannik" (Песня убогого странника), in his proclamation campaign promoting the idea of the peasant revolution. The same song was quoted by Alexander Hertsen in the issue of Kolokol printed on 1 February 1862.

== Storyline ==
Part one

Ivan, the younger of the two peddlers (korobeiniks) seduces Katerina in the fields at night. The girl who is in love with him, chooses to buy just one turquoise ring, refusing to take any presents. Departing, he promises to marry her on return.

Part two

Ivan and Tikhonych enter another village and get surrounded by the local women fascinated by their goods. The old man proves to be a shrewd bargainer; his younger friend is embarrassed by his ways of holding the price.

Part three

Out of the village and seeing a church, Tikhonych becomes remorseful, ashamed of the lies he had to tell poor women. He blames the war for the dire state of the market, with mothers crying for their soldier sons and having no money for dresses and finery.
One line: "What's fun and games for the Tsar/Is grief for a common man" proved especially controversial: all the pre-1917 editions featured the changed version with "царь" (the Tsar) replaced by "враг" (vrag, the enemy).

Part four

In the morning the two continue their journey. Again complaining about the poor trade, Tikhonych blames Paris for the way Russian women have suddenly all gone fashion minded ("Should you dislike your own nose /They'll glue you another one there," goes one line).

Part five

Katerina works alone in the fields. Pining for Ivan whom she badly wants to marry, she extols her own virtues, including good character and the willingness to do all the hard work for her future husband.

Part six

Looking for a shorter way back to Kostroma the travelers find themselves in the moors. A gloomy looking forest ranger with a gun offers himself as a companion. Having figured out there should be a lot of money with the men whose boxes are empty, he kills and robs them. Later in the village's pothouse he launches a spree and inadvertently lets his story out. The police arrives, the murderer is arrested, the dead bodies are found.

== Influence ==
The beginning of the poem (its 24 lines) evolved into a well-known folk song of the same name, which became widely known outside Russia as the "Tetris theme tune".

In 1910 the silent film Korobeiniki was released, based on the plot of the poem, directed by Vasily Goncharov.

== See also ==
- Ukhar Kupets
