= The Physiology of Saint Petersburg =

- Author: various
- Original title: Физиология Петербурга
- Language: Russian
- Genre: literary almanac
- Publication date: 1845
- Publication place: Russia
- Media type: Print (hardback & paperback)
- Followed by: Saint Petersburg Collection

The Physiology of Saint Petersburg (Russian: Физиология Петербурга) is the first of three major literary almanacs compiled and edited in the 1840s by Nikolai Nekrasov. It came out in two volumes in Saint Petersburg in 1845, to be followed by The Petersburg Collection (Петербургский сборник) and April the First. The Illustrated Comical Almanac (Первое апреля. Комический иллюстрированный альманах). The Physiology of Saint Petersburg had considerable success and is regarded in retrospect as a major incentive for the development of realism in the Russian literature.

== History ==
In spring 1844 Nikolai Nekrasov tried to publish "The Petersburg Corners", an excerpt from his autobiographical novel The Life and Adventures of Tikhon Trostnikov, in Literaturnaya Gazeta, but the piece, described by biographer Korney Chukovsky as "by far superior to everything he'd written before," was stopped by censors. It was then that the author came up with the idea of compiling an almanac which would unite the authors of the Nikolai Gogol-led "natural school". He found an enthusiastic supporter in Vissarion Belinsky who at the moment was "waging the war for Gogol" against the Russian literary retrogrades and instantly recognized in the proposed project a handy vehicle for his agenda. In fact, the style of the introduction written by Belinsky suggested he was a de facto co-editor who took at least some part in compiling the material, Chukovsky argued.

Among the works included into the collection were pieces by Dmitry Grigorovich, Ivan Panayev, Vladimir Dal, Yevhen Hrebinka as well as four articles by Vissarion Belinsky ("The Introduction", "The Alexandrinsky Theatre", "Petersburg and Moscow", "The Literature of St. Petersburg"), but Nekrasov's novelette was its centerpiece. Again, it caused trouble: censor Amply Otchkin found "The Petersburg Corners" "outrageous and indecent," and Nekrasov had to wait almost a year before the offending item was finally censor-approved in February 1845.

The publication proved hugely successful. Gogol himself expressed interest, asking his friend Smirnova-Rossette to send a copy to Germany where he was staying at the time. The conservative critics denounced the book unanimously. L. Brandt wrote in Severnaya Ptchela: "Nekrasov is just another component of this newest trend, set by Gogol, tending to shy all things sensitive and solemn, preferring instead to reveal scenes that are dirty and dark..., seeing art's goal as the glorification of all things ugly and obscene."

== Legacy ==
The almanac, aiming to bring the readership as close to the real life in Russia as it was possible (by exposing "all the dark corners of our social life, and all the hidden mechanisms of our existence," as Nekrasov put it), became the triumph for the "natural school". This publication, along with the 1845's Saint Petersburg Collection (the latter featuring among other works, the Poor Folk, Dostoyevsky's debut) are seen as precursors of Nekrasov's Sovremennik.
