= Isanino =

Village in Yaroslavl Oblast, Russia

Coordinates: 57°58′N 38°44′E

Isanino (Russian: Иса́нино) is a rural locality (a village) in Rybinsky District of Yaroslavl Oblast, Russia. Population: 6 (2007 est.).
