= Korobeiniki =

Russian folk song used as the Tetris theme

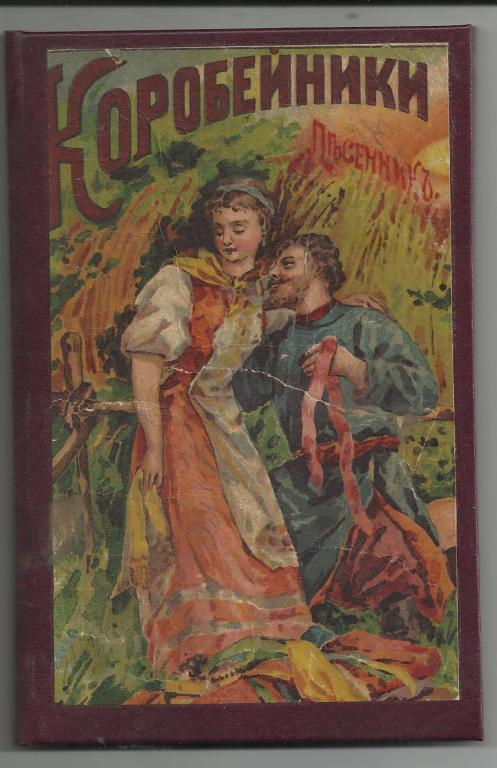
A song book cover, 1900

"Korobeiniki" (Russian: Коробе́йники, romanized: Korobéyniki, IPA: [kərɐˈbʲejnʲɪkʲɪ], lit. 'The Peddlers') is a nineteenth-century Russian folk song that tells the story of a meeting between a korobeinik (peddler) and a girl, describing their haggling over goods in a metaphor for seduction. Outside Russia, "Korobeiniki" is widely known as the Tetris theme tune.

The song "Korobeiniki" is based on the poem of the same name by Nikolay Nekrasov, which was first printed in the Sovremennik magazine in 1861. Its increasing tempo and the dance style led to it quickly becoming a popular Russian folk song. Early musical compositions of the song were published by Yakov Prigozhy and Alexander N. Chernyavsky (Чернявский, Александр Николаевич) in 1898. Varvara Panina made gramophone records of the song with several recording companies in 1905 and later. In 1950, an instrumental recording was released by Kostya Poliansky and his Balalaika Orchestra.

== Lyrics sample ==
There are several variants of the lyrics, all being minor variations of the beginning of the poem.

	Russian lyrics	Transliteration	English translation
1	Ой полным полна моя коробушка Есть и ситец, и парча. Пожалей, душа-зазнобушка, Молодецкого плеча.	Oy polnym polna moya korobushka Yest' i sitets i parcha. Pozhaley, dusha-zaznobushka, Molodetskogo plecha.	Oh, my crate is so full, I've got both calico and brocade. Take pity, oh sweetie, Of this lad's shoulder
2	Выйду, выйду в рожь высокую, Там до ночки погожу, Как завижу черноокую, Все товары разложу.	Vyydu, vyydu v rozh' vysokuyu, Tam do nochki pogozhu, Kak zavizhu chernookuyu, Vse tovary razlozhu.	I will, I will go out into the tall rye, (Note: "into the tall rye" is a sexual innuendo akin to Comin' Thro' the Rye by Robert Burns); I will wait there till the night comes, Once I see the black-eyed lass, I will showcase all my goods.
3	Цены сам платил не малые, Не торгуйся, не скупись: Подставляй-ка губы алые, Ближе к милому садись!	Tseny sam platil ne malye, Ne torguysya, ne skupis': Podstavlyay-ka guby alye, blizhe k milomu sadis'!	I paid no small prices myself, Don't bargain, don't be stingy: Bring your scarlet lips here, Sit closer to the dear lad!

== Arrangements of the song ==
Russian language performances of the song include the following

- Ivan Rebroff in his 1968 Album Ivan Rebroff Sings Folk Songs from Old Russia under the title "Karobushka"
- Chanticleer in their 1997 album Wondrous Love - A World Folk Song Collection under the title "Oy Polná, Polná Koróbushka"
- Alexandrov Ensemble in their 1988 album The Red Army Ensemble At The Royal Albert Hall under the title "Korobeiniki"

=== Tetris ===
Tetris: Theme A
Piano arrangement version used in the Tetris game

After arrangements of "Korobeiniki" first appeared in Spectrum Holobyte's Apple IIGS and Mac versions of Tetris, the song was re-arranged in 1989 by Hirokazu Tanaka as the "Type A" accompaniment in Nintendo's Game Boy version. This melody is slightly different than the Russian folksong and has since become closely associated with the game in Western popular culture and the Tetris Company has required its inclusion in every version of the game since 2002. In 2008, UGO listed the song as the 3rd best piece of video game music of all time.

The Tetris Company holds a sound trademark on this variation of the song for use in video games. The official Tetris website wrote that Korobeiniki was "memorable enough on its own as both a poem and folk tune", independent of its adaption into the Tetris theme.

Doctor Spin's 1992 novelty Eurodance cover version under the name "Tetris" reached No. 6 on the UK singles chart.

The 2023 song "Hold on Tight", performed by aespa and featured in the 2023 film Tetris, samples the Tetris theme song.

In November 2024, Hiiragi Magnetite released the song "Tetoris" (featuring Kasane Teto), inspired by the Tetris theme. The song spread rapidly on social media immediately after its release, debuting at number one on both the JAPAN Heatseekers Songs and Niconico Vocaloid Songs Top 20 charts. It also debuted at number 71 on the Billboard Japan Hot 100 chart for the week of December 23, 2024, eventually reaching number 35. The music video reached 10 million views on YouTube in December, followed by reaching 100 million views on December 1st 2025, becoming the first solo song for Kasane Teto's Synth V Voicebank.

=== Other adaptations and versions ===
- Tokyo Ska Paradise Orchestra has recorded and performed versions of the song under the title "Peddlers" (sometimes ぺドラーズ "Pedorāzu") since their eponymous debut EP in 1989. Most recently, it can be found on their 2014 album Ska Me Forever.
- String quartet Bond included a version on their 2000 debut album Born called "Korobushka", which they often perform at their live concerts.
- American rock band Ozma released a rock version on their 2001 album The Doubble Donkey Disc; it was used in the 2013 film Kick Ass 2.
- An Italian house remix of the song, "Cammino Contento", was featured on the 2005 Gigi D'Agostino compilation album Disco Tanz.
- The song has also been arranged by Yoko Shimomura for Super Smash Bros. Brawl. The song is retained in later entries of the Super Smash Bros. series as well.
- The Timbers Army performs the melody with altered lyrics during Portland Timbers games, usually accompanied by a simple dance with a large visual effect.
- German band dArtagnan used the music for their song "Trink mein Freund" and released a folk rock version of "Korobeiniki" (in Russian) on their 2022 album Felsenfest.
- The song was used for the song Quem ficar parado é petista disfarçado, a popular Brazilian funk that became popular during the 2026 Brazilian general elections. The influent right-wing politicians Lucas Pavanato, the most-voted federal deputy for São Paulo and Eduarda Campopiano, the most-voted state deputy for São Paulo, danced along with the song at rallies.
