= Nekouzsky District =

Nekouzsky District Некоузский район (Russian)
- District
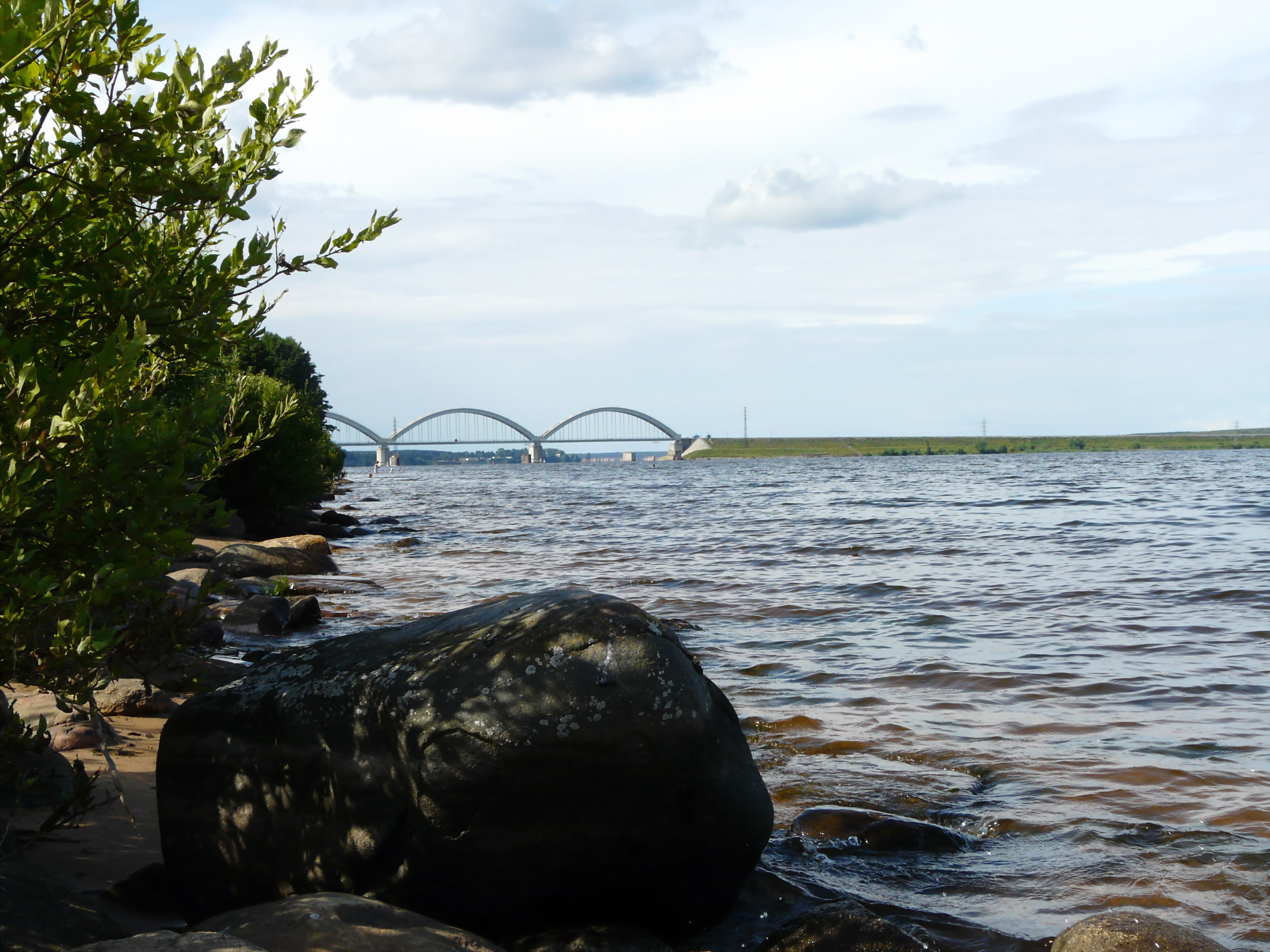
- Railway bridge across the Volga River connecting Nekouzsky and Rybinsky Districts

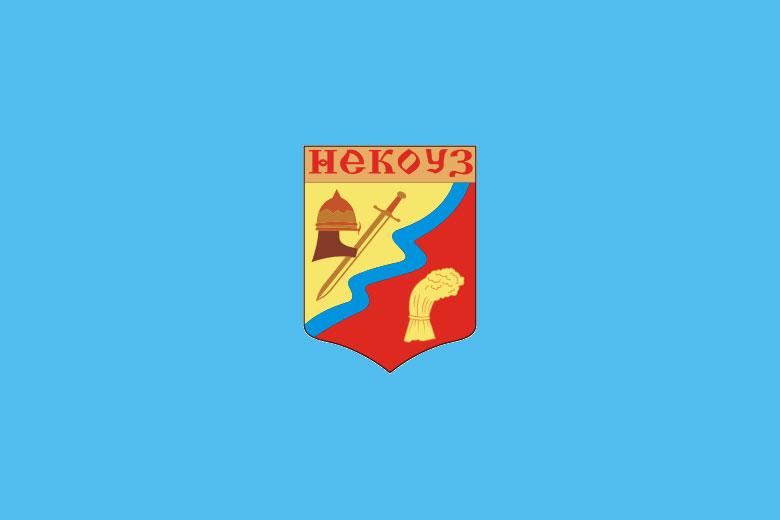
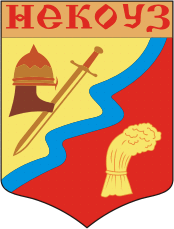
- Flag Coat of arms
- Location of Nekouzsky District in Yaroslavl Oblast
- Coordinates: 57°54′17″N 38°04′02″E
- Country: Russia
- Federal subject: Yaroslavl Oblast
- Established: 1929
- Administrative center: Novy Nekouz

Area
  - Total: 1,954.3 km^{2} (754.6 sq mi)

Population (2010 Census)
  - Total: 15,688
  - Estimate (2018): 14,133 (−9.9%)
  - Density: 8.0274/km^{2} (20.791/sq mi)
  - Urban: 0%
  - Rural: 100%

Administrative structure
  - Administrative divisions: 11 Rural okrugs
  - Inhabited localities: 386 rural localities

Municipal structure
  - Municipally incorporated as: Nekouzsky Municipal District
  - Municipal divisions: 0 urban settlements, 4 rural settlements
- Time zone: UTC+3 (MSK)
- OKTMO ID: 78623000
- Website: http://www.nekouz.ru/

Nekouzsky District (Russian: Некоу́зский райо́н) is an administrative and municipal district (raion), one of the seventeen in Yaroslavl Oblast, Russia. It is located in the west of the oblast. The area of the district is 1,954.3 square kilometers (754.6 sq mi). Its administrative center is the rural locality (a selo) of Novy Nekouz. Population: 15,688 (2010 Census); 19,756 (2002 census); 23,931 (1989 Soviet census). The population of Novy Nekouz accounts for 22.1% of the district's total population.
