= Glushitsy =

Village in the Rybinsk District of the Yaroslavl Region of Russia

Coordinates: 58°02′22″N 38°39′13″E

Glushitsy (Russian: Глушицы) is a rural locality (a village) in Rybinsky District of Yaroslavl Oblast, Russia. Population: 2.
