= Breytovsky District =

Breytovsky District Брейтовский район (Russian)
- District
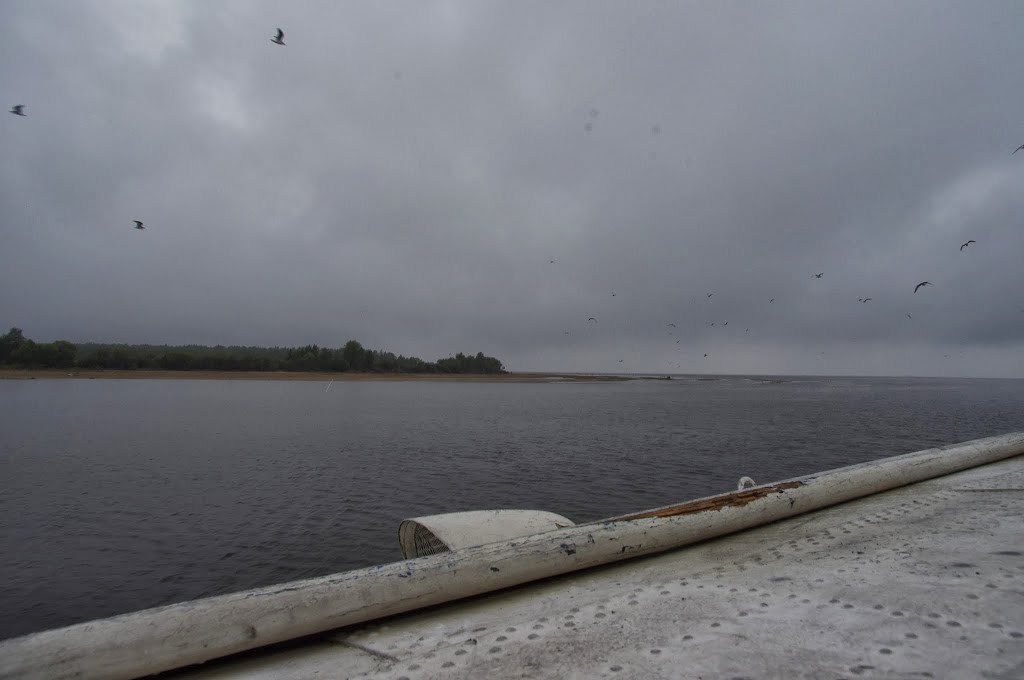
- Lake scene, Breytovsky District

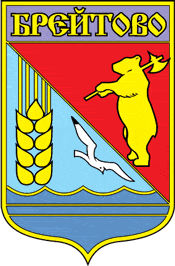
- Coat of arms
- Location of Breytovsky District in Yaroslavl Oblast
- Coordinates: 58°18′N 37°52′E
- Country: Russia
- Federal subject: Yaroslavl Oblast
- Established: 10 June 1929
- Administrative center: Breytovo

Area
  - Total: 2,160 km^{2} (830 sq mi)

Population (2010 Census)
  - Total: 7,034
  - Estimate (2018): 6,116 (−13.1%)
  - Density: 3.26/km^{2} (8.43/sq mi)
  - Urban: 0%
  - Rural: 100%

Administrative structure
  - Administrative divisions: 8 Rural okrugs
  - Inhabited localities: 166 rural localities

Municipal structure
  - Municipally incorporated as: Breytovsky Municipal District
  - Municipal divisions: 0 urban settlements, 3 rural settlements
- Time zone: UTC+3 (MSK)
- OKTMO ID: 78609000
- Website: http://breitovo.narod.ru/

Breytovsky District (Russian: Брейтовский райо́н) is an administrative and municipal district (raion), one of the seventeen in Yaroslavl Oblast, Russia. It is located in the northwest of the oblast. The area of the district is 2,160 square kilometers (830 sq mi). Its administrative center is the rural locality (a selo) of Breytovo. Population: 7,034 (2010 Census); 9,183 (2002 census); 11,019 (1989 Soviet census). The population of Breytovo accounts for 47.0% of the district's total population.
