= Karabikha =

Village in Yaroslavl, Russia

Coordinates: 57°30′34″N 39°45′22″E

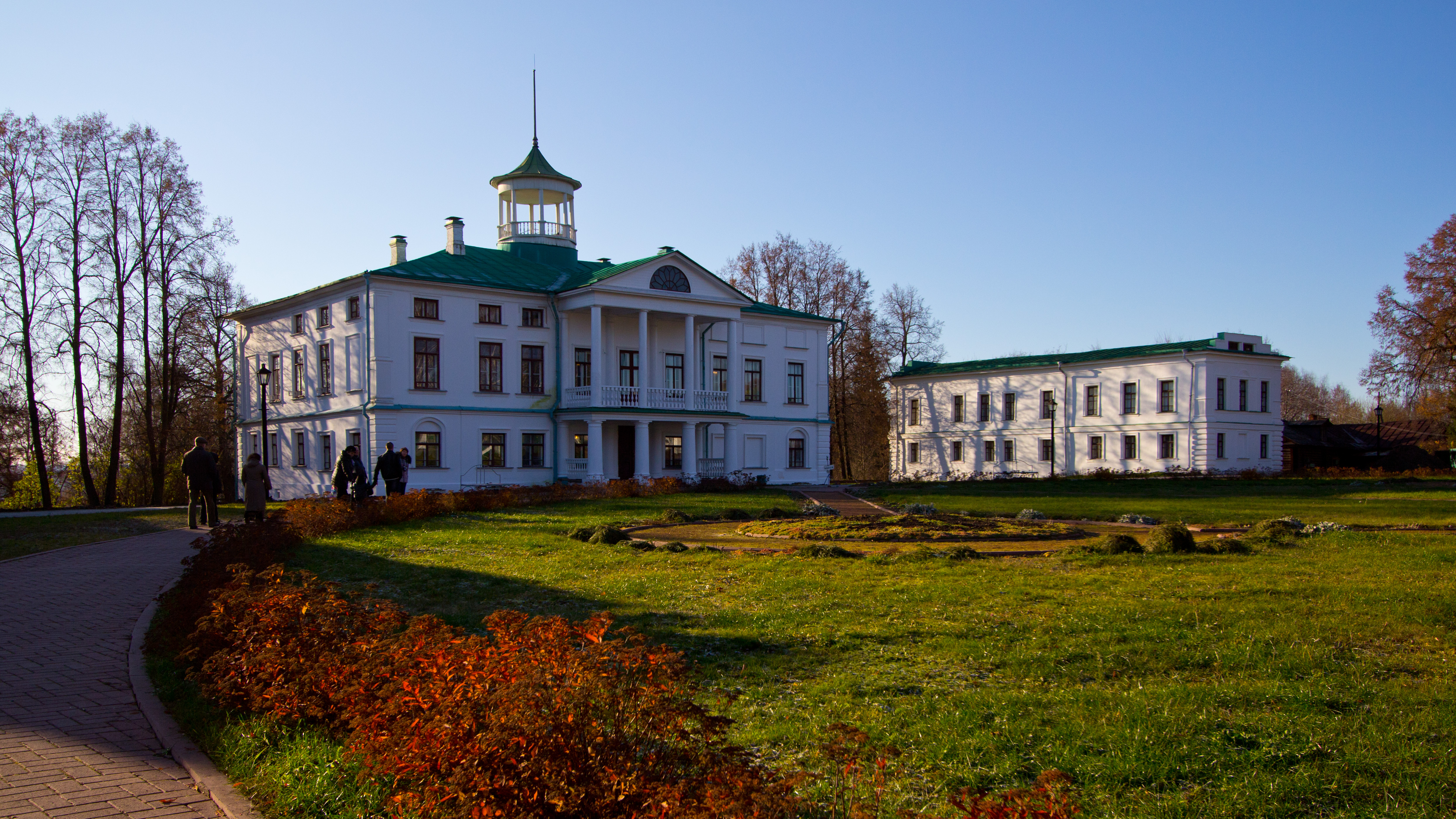
Karabikha Palace of Prince Galitzine

Karabikha (Russian: Кара́биха) is a village in Yaroslavl Oblast, Russia, located 15 kilometers to the south of Yaroslavl center. The great Russian poet Nikolay Nekrasov lived and worked there for some time. There is now a Nekrasov museum in the village.
