= Labunino =

Rural locality in Yaroslavl Oblast, Russia

Coordinates: 57°57′N 38°49′E

Labunino (Russian: Лабунино) is a rural locality (a village) in Rybinsky District of Yaroslavl Oblast, Russia. Population: 3 (2007 est.).
