= Korobeyniki, Perm Krai =

Korobeyniki Коробейники
- Village
- Location within Perm Krai Location within Russia
- Coordinates: 56°42′N 56°15′E
- Country: Russia
- Region: Perm Krai
- District: Chernushinsky District
- Time zone: UTC+5:00

Korobeyniki (Russian: Коробейники) is a rural locality (a village) in Chernushinsky District, Perm Krai, Russia. The population was 197 as of 2010. There are 7 streets.

== Geography ==
Korobeyniki is located 33 km north of Chernushka (the district's administrative centre) by road. Demenevo is the nearest rural locality.
