= Novy Nekouz =

Novy Nekouz Новый Некоуз
- Selo
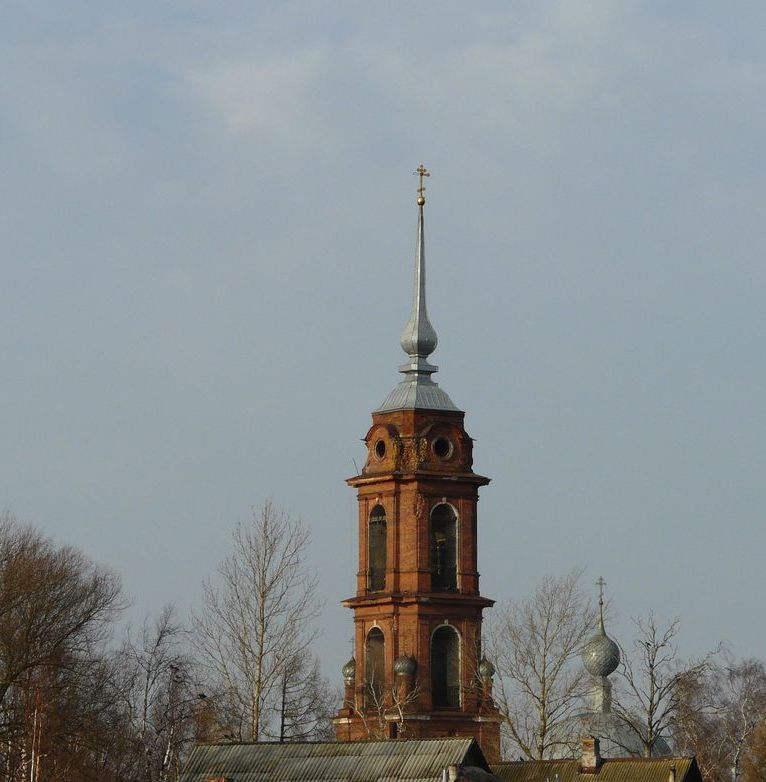
- Interactive map of Novy Nekouz
- Location of Novy Nekouz Novy Nekouz (Yaroslavl Oblast)
- Coordinates: 57°54′N 38°04′E
- Country: Russia
- Federal subject: Yaroslavl Oblast
- Administrative district: Nekouzsky District

Population (2010 Census)
  - Total: 3,462

Administrative status
  - Capital of: Nekouzsky District
- Time zone: UTC+3 (MSK)
- Postal code: 152730
- OKTMO ID: 78623415101

Novy Nekouz (Russian: Но́вый Не́коуз) is a rural locality (a selo) and the administrative center of Nekouzsky District of Yaroslavl Oblast, Russia. Population: 3,462 (2010 census); 3,707 (2002 census); 3,796 (1989 Soviet census).

== History ==
Between 1975 and 1993, Novy Nekouz had the status of an urban settlement. An important poultry farm was founded in the town in 1993.
