= Morbid love =

Morbid love (French: l’amour morbide) was a term used in psychiatric texts of the late nineteenth and early twentieth centuries. It referred to what was becoming more commonly described as sexual perversion or pathology. It was a term inspired by decadent French fiction, especially the poetry of Charles Baudelaire, and Rachilde.

== Historical relevance ==
=== Art and literature ===
The idea of morbid love originated from early Romantic and ancient texts where love-disease imagery was conceptualised in poetry (as opposed to medical papers). However, significant proliferation of this idea, sparked in late nineteenth century France, where there were developments in the Decadence movement, pioneered by the aforementioned Charles Baudelaire, as well as other names such as Théophile Gautier, and Félicien Rops. The movement followed an anti-bourgeoisie and immoral aesthetic to art and literature, encapsulating it as a hedonistic, sensual indulgence in onanism (masturbation), superficial sex and fantasy, while also disregarding the logical nature of the universe.

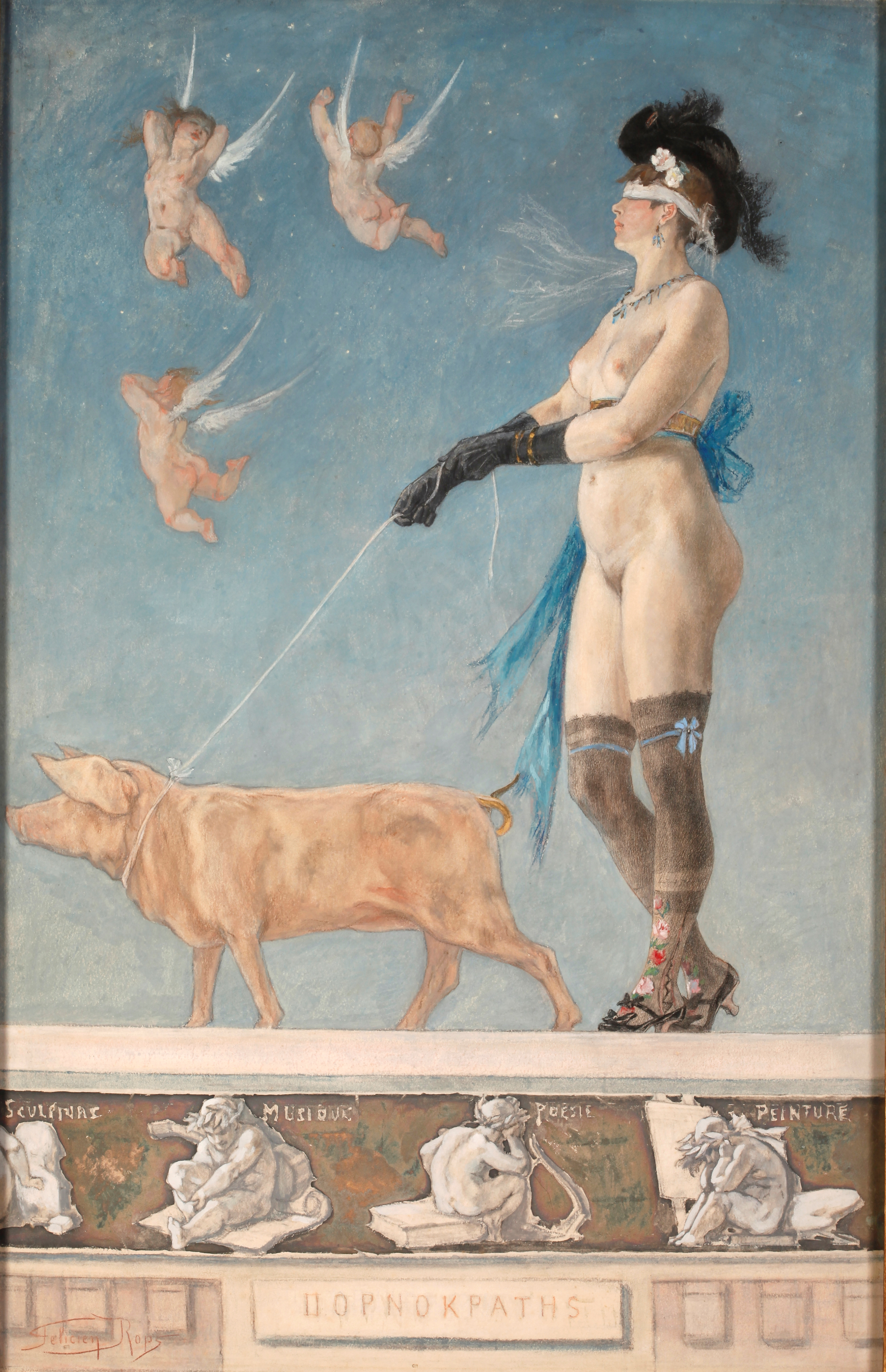
Félicien Rops' 1878 painting titled "Pornokratès"

French Decadence in literature often portrayed images of the supernatural, and referred to perverse, gruesome and fantastical descriptions of Satan, women and human horrors. Decadent poetry "requires a strong stomach," and attempts to undermine cultural values and the supposed progressive trajectory of society, putting pleasure ahead of them both. French philosopher Montesquieu proposed that one of the reasons for the decline in the Roman Empire was due to décadence, or, simply put, the eroding of morality and social customs. Often confused with Symbolism, Romanticism and Aestheticism, Decadence outside of France saw influence from gothic fiction from authors such as Edgar Allan Poe, Arthur Symons and later on, Oscar Wilde, presenting disconformity through artistic mediums.

During the 1890s, Decadence dominated the cultural sphere, where there were debates on whether or not such degenerate behaviour would lead to the fin de siècle, meaning "end of the century," in French. Hence, by this time, Decadence had led to a larger acceptance for different forms of morbid love, which included homosexuality and lesbianism. These were extremely contentious ideas at the time which resulted in the mob violence commonly experienced by members of the gay community.

== Social psychopathology ==
=== Causes ===
Morbid love, in psychiatric terms, refers to any love-related disease, most commonly lovesickness, but it can also refer to other mental disorders, often associated with degrading or toxic social interactions with romantic or sexual partners, such as erotomania, nymphomania, stalking, love addiction, disappointment from love, hypersexuality and obsessive sexual thinking. Extreme levels of sexual perversion, psychopathy and lust induce symptoms of pathological jealousy and love, which damage the quality of interpersonal encounters and neglect the needs of oneself to cater to those of others.

Pathological jealousy refers to a continual perceived likelihood of losing one's romantic partner to a rival, has its origins in attachment theory: if child-rearing conditions were less than ideal, or if the connection between the new-born and primary care-giver is absent or insubstantial, this can reduce the security of forthcoming relationships and thus is likely to carry over onto adulthood. Having a secure and loving attachment during childhood has been linked with a low chance of someone experiencing pathological jealousy. On the other hand, pathological love is unrestrained and persistent compassion and affection shown towards a romantic partner, which, if unmediated, can lead to obsessive devotion to a person, despite the dissatisfaction and corruption the relationship poses.

=== Clinical treatments ===
Despite the fact that morbid love entrenches obsessive tendencies associated with sex, death and violence within relationships, its use in the psychiatric and psychological field has diminished and it has slowly become more redundant towards the end of the twentieth century, particularly when lovesickness as a diagnosable disorder declined in its relevance in the clinical space. Before which, treatment for lovesickness often included cognitive behavioural therapy (CBT), recommended by Frank Tallis, as well as anti-depressants, twelve-step behavioural treatment and psychotherapy, of which Fisher was a large proponent. When morbid love was more conceptualised as a love addiction in the early nineties, treatment usually consisted of changing thoughts and behaviours with what is known as rational self-counselling, similar to rational emotional therapy.

Tallis, a leading clinical psychologist in the field of romance, drew connections between love and addiction: ‘addicts feel incomplete, they obsess, crave, and feel out of control; they experience severe mood disturbance…they become dependent and, when denied, suffer from a withdrawal syndrome; addicts accept that their behaviour is irrational, but feel compelled to continue.’ However, clinical studies and medical papers have struggled to come up with a cogent relationship between love addiction and morbid love, primarily because both concepts were developed outside of academia. Psychiatric papers also historically disregarded the inclusion of psychopathologies of love and relationships, usually due to a lack of scientific rigour.
