= Abbakumtsevo =

Abbakumtsevo Аббакумцево
- Selo
- Location within Yaroslavl Oblast Location within Russia
- Coordinates: 57°43′N 40°09′E
- Country: Russia
- Region: Yaroslavl Oblast
- District: Nekrasovsky District
- Time zone: [[UTC+3:00]]

Abbakumtsevo (Russian: Аббакумцево) is a rural locality (a selo) in Krasny Profintern of Nekrasovsky District, Yaroslavl Oblast, Russia. The population was 2 as of 2002. There are 6 streets.

== Geography ==
The village is located on the left bank of the Volga River, 31 km northwest of Nekrasovskoye (the district's administrative centre) by road. Igumnovo is the nearest rural locality.
