= Breytovo =

Breytovo Брейтово
- Selo
- Interactive map of Breytovo
- Location of Breytovo Breytovo (Yaroslavl Oblast)
- Coordinates: 58°18′N 37°52′E
- Country: Russia
- Federal subject: Yaroslavl Oblast
- Administrative district: Breytovsky District
- Elevation: 109 m (358 ft)

Population (2010 Census)
  - Total: 3,308
  - Estimate (2010): 3,308 (0%)

Administrative status
  - Capital of: Breytovsky District
- Time zone: UTC+3 (MSK)
- Postal code: 152760
- OKTMO ID: 78609411101

Breytovo (Russian: Бре́йтово) is a rural locality (a selo) and the administrative center of Breytovsky District of Yaroslavl Oblast, Russia. Population: 3,308 (2010 census); 3,710 (2002 census); 4,015 (1989 Soviet census).

== History ==
The first written sources mentioning the place and its surroundings are related to weaving crafts in ancient Russia. Breytovo is mentioned on November 17, 1613, in a book of account of the crown. On February 28, 1934, the village of Breytovo was officially reunited with the neighboring village of Zaruchye, all taking the name Breytovo.

When the huge Rybinsk Reservoir was built, after the construction of the Rybinsk Dam (1935–1941), Breitovo was engulfed by the water and the houses were moved.

Between 1986 and 1991, Breytovo had the status of an urban village.

Breitovo is also known, as well as its surrounding villages, for having been the place of breeding from the beginning of the 20th century of a pig breed, Breitovo.
