= Petrakovo, Yaroslavl Oblast =

Russian village

Petrakovo Петраково
- Village
- Location within Yaroslavl Oblast Location within Russia
- Coordinates: 57°17′11″N 39°54′14″E
- Country: Russia
- Republic: Yaroslavl
- District: Gavrilov-Yamsky
- Rural settlement district: Zayachye-Kholmsky
- Rural district: Stavotinsky

Area
  - Total: 0.06 km^{2} (0.023 sq mi)
- Elevation: 139 m (456 ft)

Population (2025)
  - Total: 149
  - Density: 2,500/km^{2} (6,400/sq mi)
- Time zone: UTC+3 (MSK)
- Postal code: 152241

Petrakovo (Russian: Петраково) is a village in Gavrilov-Yamsky District, Yaroslavl Oblast, Russia.

== Geography and climate ==
=== Physical geography ===
The village is located in the south-eastern part of the Yaroslavl Oblast, in a zone of coniferous-broad-leaved forests, on the 78K-0007 highway and the 1846 "Velikoselskaya" trade road. It is approximately 1 kilometer southeast of the town Gavrilov-Yam, which is the administrative center of Zayachye-Kholmsky district. The village has an elevation of 139 meters above sea level.

=== Climate ===
The climate is characterized as moderately continental, with moderately cold winters and relatively warm summers. The average annual air temperature is 3–3.5 °C. The average air temperature of the coldest month (January) is -13.3 °C; the warmest month (July) is 18 °C. The growing season lasts about 165–170 days. The annual amount of precipitation is 500–600 mm, most of which falls during the warm period.

=== Demographics ===
Petrakovo's population has fluctuated from 2002 to 2010, from 2 in 2002 (entirely Russian ethnicity), to 9 in 2007, to 5 in 2010. But this rose sharply throughout the following 15 years, with the population reaching 149 as of 2025.

As of 2025:

- The village is inhabited by 4 people under 7 years old, 7 people from 8 to 18 years old, 18 people from 19 to 30 years old, 69 people from 31 to 60 years old, 43 people from 60 to 80 years old, and 8 people over 80 years old.
- The gender distribution is 65 men and 84 women.
- 62% of the population has attended higher education, 15% has attended up to high school education equivalent, and the remaining 23% has not attended high school education equivalent.
- The village has a 5.8% unemployment rate, with the remaining being 59.6% employed and 34.6% on pensions.
- There are 12 people in the village with disabilities.

The village also has its own cemetery.

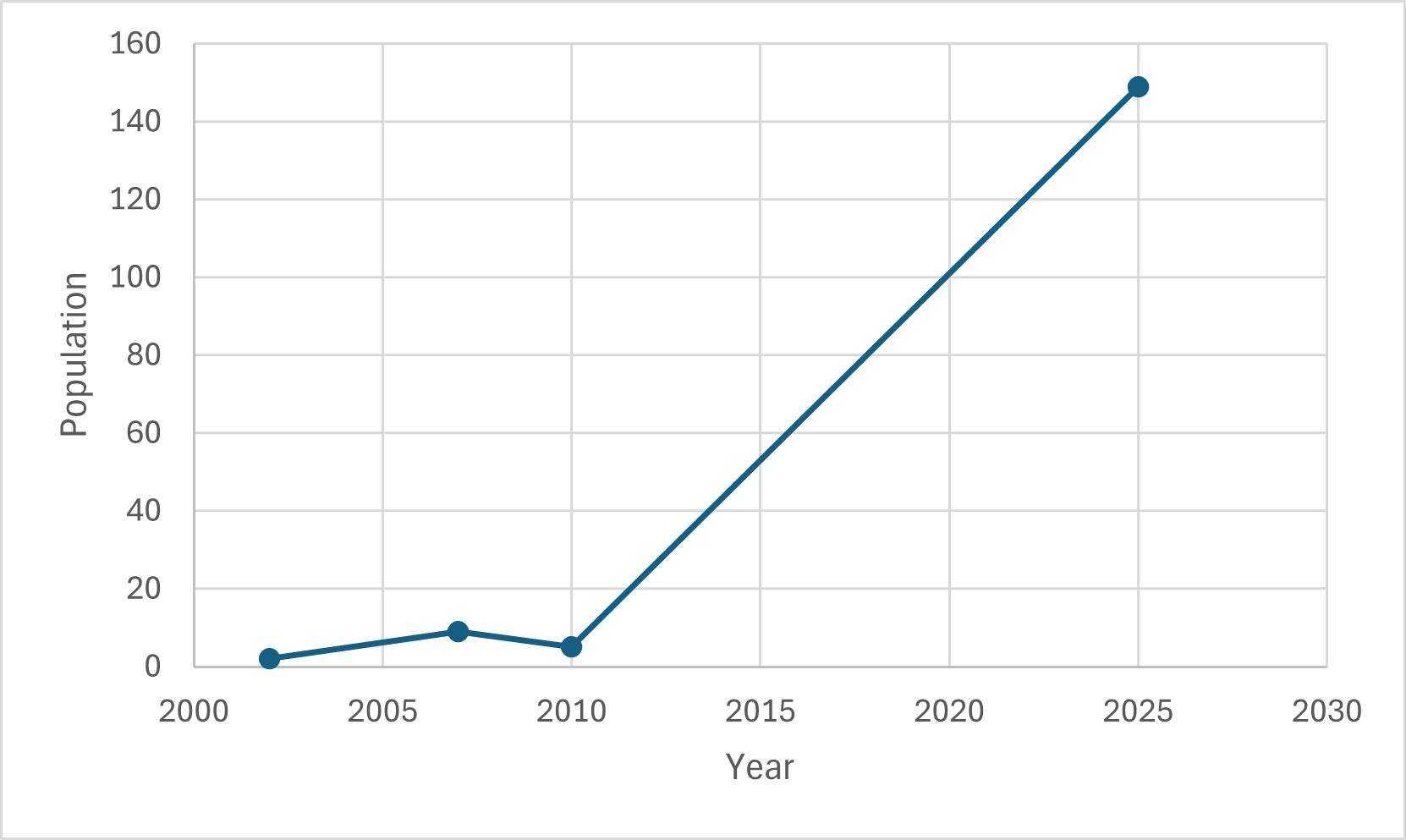
Population chart of Petrakovo

== History and events ==
- In 1918 and 1932, according to official documents, the Soviet government arrested the same resident, Averin Konstantin Federovich, twice for suspected "counter-revolutionary agitation". The first time, he was imprisoned for six months, and the second time he was sent to a concentration camp for five years.
- In 1939, a concert took place on a government-owned farm in Petrakovo as part of a music festival.
- In 2013, a pension fund office was built in Petrakovo.
- In 2015, a car accident occurred in Petrakovo, leaving three people injured.
- In January 2017, a private residential building in Petrakovo caught fire. After three crews of 11 firefighters attended the scene and spent an hour extinguishing the fire, the building's roof and an adjacent farm yard has been burnt down and the building's walls were damaged. There was at least one injury that occurred from the incident. Another fire in the village occurred May 2017, where property was damaged but there were no injuries.
- In 2019, the Yaroslavl oblast government announced it would be providing natural gas access to 45 households in the village as part of its regional "Let's Decide Together!" project, after Petrakovo residents voted unanimously for the construction of gas distribution networks and collectively planned in coordination with the regional government - although it was funded by the residents themselves rather than taxes.

== Notable people ==
- Golitsyn Anatoly Vasilyevich - military leader and Hero of the Soviet Union, 1908-1978.
