= Shurskol =

Shurskol Шу́рскол
- Selo
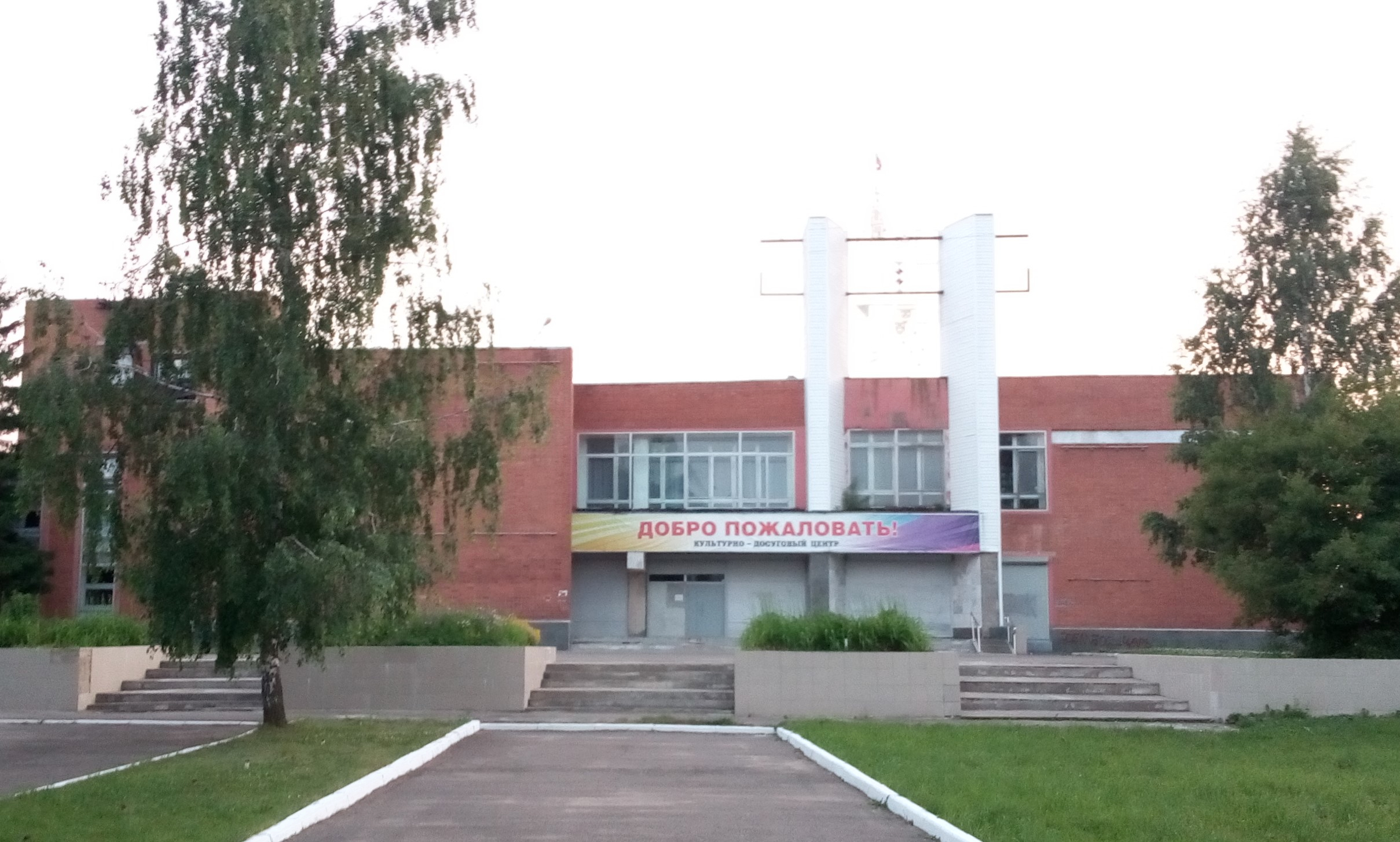
- Shurskol House of culture (June 2018)
- Interactive map of Shurskol
- Location of Shurskol Shurskol (Yaroslavl Oblast)
- Coordinates: 57.1531°N 39.2896°E
- Country: Russia
- Federal subject: Yaroslavl Oblast
- Administrative district: Rostovsky District
- Elevation: 153 m (502 ft)

Population (2010 Census)
  - Total: 2,123
- Time zone: UTC+3 (MSK)
- Postal code: 152124
- Dialing code: +7 48536
- OKTMO ID: 78637412381

Shurskol (Russian: Шу́рскол) is a village (selo) in Rostovsky District of Yaroslavl Oblast, Russia. It is located 189 kilometres (117 mi) from Moscow, 59 kilometres (37 mi) from Yaroslavl, 5 kilometres (3.1 mi) from Rostov, 4 kilometres (2.5 mi) from the Moscow-Arkhangelsk federal highway (part of European route E115), and 2 kilometres (1.2 mi) from the Moscow-Yaroslavl railway line. The nearest railway station, Rostov-Yaroslavsky, is 9 km from the village. Shurskol is located on the left bank of the Mazikha River, covering the slopes of two gentle hills, forming a ravine. Population: 2,123 (2010 census); 2,298 (2002 census); the area is 1.1 km^{2}.
