= Greshnevo, Yaroslavl Oblast =

Rural locality in Nekrasovsky District, Yaroslavl Oblast, Russia

Coordinates: 57.7047°N 40.2158°E

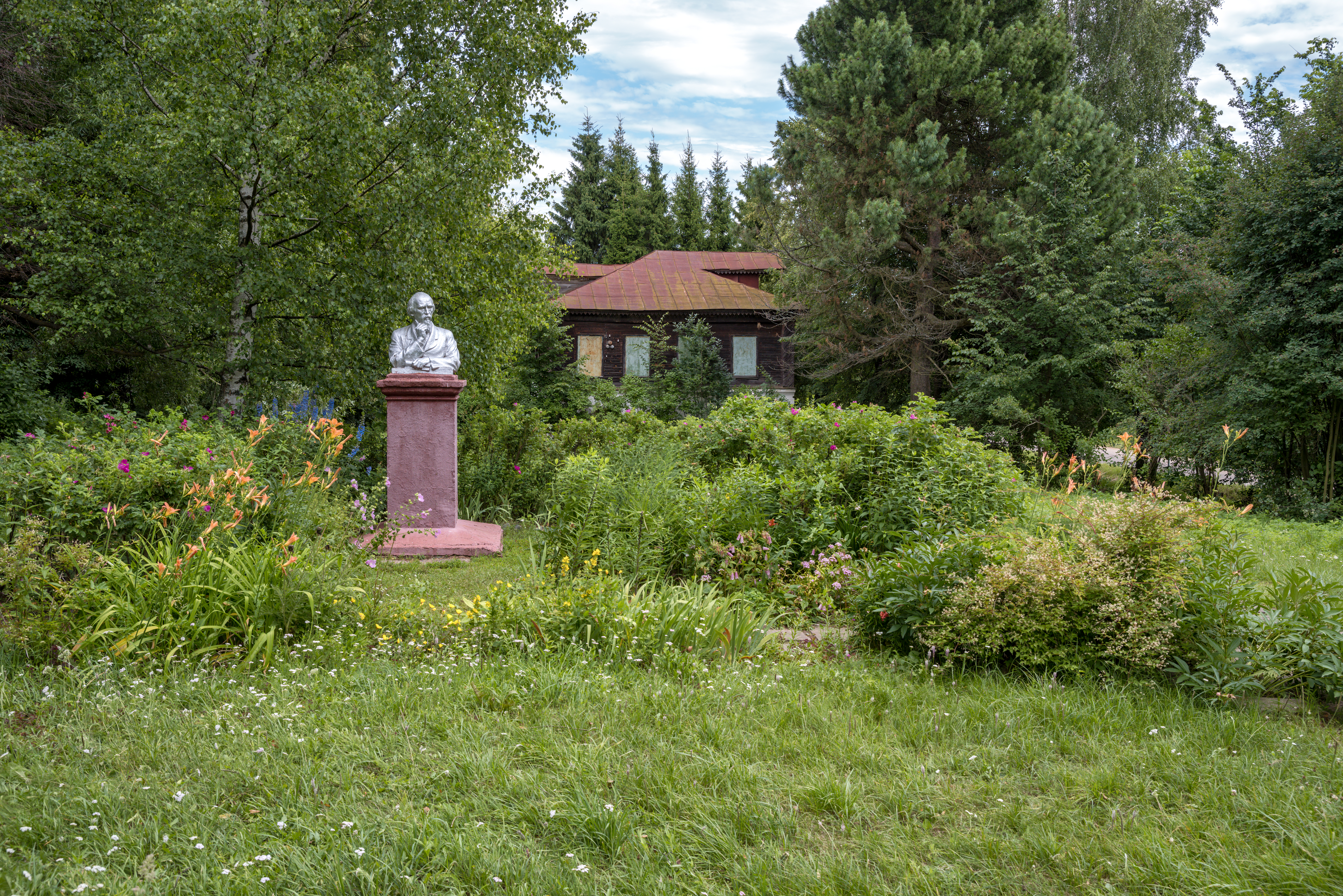
Greshnevo Memorial Park, Greshnevo

Greshnevo (Russian: Гре́шнево) is a village in Nekrasovsky District of Yaroslavl Oblast, Russia. Population: 588.

The great Russian poet Nikolay Nekrasov lived here during his childhood. Presently, the village is home to a Nekrasov museum. The village was renamed Nekrasovo in the past, but the original name Greshnevo has been restored since then.
