= Breitovo =

Breed of pig

- Other names: Russian: Бpeйтoвcкaя; Breitovskaya
- Distribution: Russia

Traits

The Breitovo or Breit (Russian: Бpeйтoвcкaя, Breitovskaya) is a general purpose pig breed from Russia. It was derived from the crossing of Large White, Danish Landrace, Belarusian Polessye, Lithuanian and Latvian breeds.
