= Korobeinik =

Imperial Russian term for a peddler

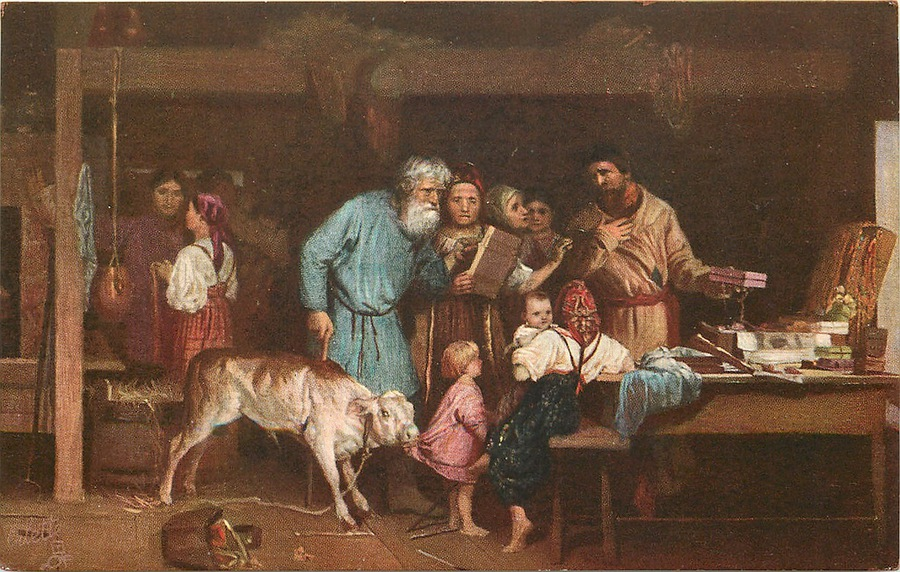
Ofenya-korobeinik, Nikolay Koshelev, 1865

Korobeinik (Russian: коробейник) was an occupation in the Russian Empire, a petty peddler. The name comes from the word korob, a box, in which he carried the goods, usually haberdashery and small manufactured items around the countryside.

== In popular culture ==
There is a Russian folk song "Korobeiniki" based on the poem of the same name by Nikolay Nekrasov.

In 1910 Vasily Goncharov made a 15 min. silent film based on the poem.
