= Mikhaylovsky, Russia =

Mikhaylovsky (Russian: Миха́йловский; masculine), Mikhaylovskaya (Миха́йловская; feminine), or Mikhaylovskoye (Миха́йловское; neuter) is the name of several rural localities in Russia.

== Altai Krai ==
As of 2010, one rural locality in Altai Krai bears this name:

- Mikhaylovskoye, Altai Krai, a selo in Mikhaylovsky Selsoviet of Mikhaylovsky District

== Arkhangelsk Oblast ==
As of 2010, six rural localities in Arkhangelsk Oblast bear this name:

- Mikhaylovskaya, Kargopolsky District, Arkhangelsk Oblast, a village in Tikhmangsky Selsoviet of Kargopolsky District
- Mikhaylovskaya, Rovdinsky Selsoviet, Shenkursky District, Arkhangelsk Oblast, a village in Rovdinsky Selsoviet of Shenkursky District
- Mikhaylovskaya, Ust-Padengsky Selsoviet, Shenkursky District, Arkhangelsk Oblast, a village in Ust-Padengsky Selsoviet of Shenkursky District
- Mikhaylovskaya, Ustyansky District, Arkhangelsk Oblast, a village in Chadromsky Selsoviet of Ustyansky District
- Mikhaylovskaya, Verkhnetoyemsky District, Arkhangelsk Oblast, a village in Novovershinsky Selsoviet of Verkhnetoyemsky District
- Mikhaylovskaya, Vinogradovsky District, Arkhangelsk Oblast, a village in Boretsky Selsoviet of Vinogradovsky District

== Republic of Bashkortostan ==
As of 2010, one rural locality in the Republic of Bashkortostan bears this name:

- Mikhaylovsky, Republic of Bashkortostan, a village in Yermolkinsky Selsoviet of Belebeyevsky District

== Belgorod Oblast ==
As of 2010, one rural locality in Belgorod Oblast bears this name:

- Mikhaylovsky, Belgorod Oblast, a khutor in Gubkinsky District

== Bryansk Oblast ==
As of 2010, four rural localities in Bryansk Oblast bear this name:

- Mikhaylovsky, Sevsky District, Bryansk Oblast, a settlement in Dobrovodsky Selsoviet of Sevsky District
- Mikhaylovsky, Trubchevsky District, Bryansk Oblast, a settlement in Plyuskovsky Selsoviet of Trubchevsky District
- Mikhaylovsky, Sosnovobolotsky Selsoviet, Vygonichsky District, Bryansk Oblast, a settlement in Sosnovobolotsky Selsoviet of Vygonichsky District
- Mikhaylovsky, Vygonichi Settlement Council, Vygonichsky District, Bryansk Oblast, a settlement in Vygonichi Settlement Council of Vygonichsky District

== Ivanovo Oblast ==
As of 2010, four rural localities in Ivanovo Oblast bear this name:

- Mikhaylovskoye, Furmanovsky District, Ivanovo Oblast, a selo in Furmanovsky District
- Mikhaylovskoye, Rodnikovsky District, Ivanovo Oblast, a selo in Rodnikovsky District
- Mikhaylovskaya, Pestyakovsky District, Ivanovo Oblast, a village in Pestyakovsky District
- Mikhaylovskaya, Zavolzhsky District, Ivanovo Oblast, a village in Zavolzhsky District

== Kaluga Oblast ==
As of 2010, four rural localities in Kaluga Oblast bear this name:

- Mikhaylovsky, Kuybyshevsky District, Kaluga Oblast, a settlement in Kuybyshevsky District
- Mikhaylovsky, Spas-Demensky District, Kaluga Oblast, a khutor in Spas-Demensky District
- Mikhaylovskoye, Iznoskovsky District, Kaluga Oblast, a village in Iznoskovsky District
- Mikhaylovskoye, Peremyshlsky District, Kaluga Oblast, a village in Peremyshlsky District

== Republic of Karelia ==
As of 2010, one rural locality in the Republic of Karelia bears this name:

- Mikhaylovskoye, Republic of Karelia, a selo in Olonetsky District

== Kemerovo Oblast ==
As of 2010, two rural localities in Kemerovo Oblast bear this name:

- Mikhaylovsky, Kemerovsky District, Kemerovo Oblast, a settlement in Yelykayevskaya Rural Territory of Kemerovsky District
- Mikhaylovsky, Krapivinsky District, Kemerovo Oblast, a settlement in Bannovskaya Rural Territory of Krapivinsky District

== Kirov Oblast ==
As of 2010, one rural locality in Kirov Oblast bears this name:

- Mikhaylovskoye, Kirov Oblast, a selo in Mikhaylovsky Rural Okrug of Tuzhinsky District

== Kostroma Oblast ==
As of 2010, three rural localities in Kostroma Oblast bear this name:

- Mikhaylovskoye, Antropovsky District, Kostroma Oblast, a selo in Kotelnikovskoye Settlement of Antropovsky District
- Mikhaylovskoye, Galichsky District, Kostroma Oblast, a selo in Dmitriyevskoye Settlement of Galichsky District
- Mikhaylovskoye, Sudislavsky District, Kostroma Oblast, a village in Raslovskoye Settlement of Sudislavsky District

== Krasnodar Krai ==
As of 2010, two rural localities in Krasnodar Krai bear this name:

- Mikhaylovskoye, Krasnodar Krai, a selo in Mikhaylovsky Rural Okrug of Seversky District
- Mikhaylovskaya, Krasnodar Krai, a stanitsa in Mikhaylovsky Rural Okrug of Kurganinsky District

== Kursk Oblast ==
As of 2010, one rural locality in Kursk Oblast bears this name:

- Mikhaylovsky, Kursk Oblast, a settlement in Razvetyevsky Selsoviet of Zheleznogorsky District

== Leningrad Oblast ==
As of 2010, two rural localities in Leningrad Oblast bear this name:

- Mikhaylovsky, Leningrad Oblast, a logging depot settlement in Mginskoye Settlement Municipal Formation of Kirovsky District
- Mikhaylovskaya, Leningrad Oblast, a village in Ropshinskoye Settlement Municipal Formation of Lomonosovsky District

== Lipetsk Oblast ==
As of 2010, one rural locality in Lipetsk Oblast bears this name:

- Mikhaylovsky, Lipetsk Oblast, a settlement in Menshekolodezsky Selsoviet of Dolgorukovsky District

== Republic of Mordovia ==
As of 2010, one rural locality in the Republic of Mordovia bears this name:

- Mikhaylovskoye, Republic of Mordovia, a selo in Bolsheazyassky Selsoviet of Kovylkinsky District

== Moscow Oblast ==
As of 2010, twelve rural localities in Moscow Oblast bear this name:

- Mikhaylovskoye, Domodedovo, Moscow Oblast, a selo under the administrative jurisdiction of the Domodedovo Town Under Oblast Jurisdiction
- Mikhaylovskoye, Dmitrovsky District, Moscow Oblast, a village in Yakotskoye Rural Settlement of Dmitrovsky District
- Mikhaylovskoye, Klinsky District, Moscow Oblast, a village in Nudolskoye Rural Settlement of Klinsky District
- Mikhaylovskoye, Borisovskoye Rural Settlement, Mozhaysky District, Moscow Oblast, a village in Borisovskoye Rural Settlement of Mozhaysky District
- Mikhaylovskoye, Sputnik Rural Settlement, Mozhaysky District, Moscow Oblast, a village in Sputnik Rural Settlement of Mozhaysky District
- Mikhaylovskoye, Odintsovsky District, Moscow Oblast, a selo in Yershovskoye Rural Settlement of Odintsovsky District
- Mikhaylovskoye, Podolsky District, Moscow Oblast, a selo in Mikhaylovo-Yartsevskoye Rural Settlement of Podolsky District
- Mikhaylovskoye, Pushkinsky District, Moscow Oblast, a village in Tsarevskoye Rural Settlement of Pushkinsky District
- Mikhaylovskoye, Ruzsky District, Moscow Oblast, a village in Volkovskoye Rural Settlement of Ruzsky District
- Mikhaylovskoye, Shakhovskoy District, Moscow Oblast, a village in Ramenskoye Rural Settlement of Shakhovskoy District
- Mikhaylovskoye, Volokolamsky District, Moscow Oblast, a village in Yaropoletskoye Rural Settlement of Volokolamsky District
- Mikhaylovskaya, Moscow Oblast, a village in Dmitrovskoye Rural Settlement of Shatursky District

== Nizhny Novgorod Oblast ==
As of 2010, two rural localities in Nizhny Novgorod Oblast bear this name:

- Mikhaylovskoye, Chkalovsky District, Nizhny Novgorod Oblast, a selo in Purekhovsky Selsoviet of Chkalovsky District
- Mikhaylovskoye, Vorotynsky District, Nizhny Novgorod Oblast, a selo in Mikhaylovsky Selsoviet of Vorotynsky District

== Republic of North Ossetia–Alania ==
As of 2010, one rural locality in the Republic of North Ossetia–Alania bears this name:

- Mikhaylovskoye, Republic of North Ossetia–Alania, a selo in Mikhaylovsky Rural Okrug of Prigorodny District

== Novgorod Oblast ==
As of 2010, one rural locality in Novgorod Oblast bears this name:

- Mikhaylovskoye, Novgorod Oblast, a village in Peredolskoye Settlement of Batetsky District

== Novosibirsk Oblast ==
As of 2010, one rural locality in Novosibirsk Oblast bears this name:

- Mikhaylovsky, Novosibirsk Oblast, a settlement in Chulymsky District

== Orenburg Oblast ==
As of 2010, one rural locality in Orenburg Oblast bears this name:

- Mikhaylovsky, Orenburg Oblast, a settlement in Rossiysky Selsoviet of Oktyabrsky District

== Oryol Oblast ==
As of 2010, five rural localities in Oryol Oblast bear this name:

- Mikhaylovsky, Dmitrovsky District, Oryol Oblast, a settlement in Druzhensky Selsoviet of Dmitrovsky District
- Mikhaylovsky, Kromskoy District, Oryol Oblast, a settlement in Kutafinsky Selsoviet of Kromskoy District
- Mikhaylovsky, Livensky District, Oryol Oblast, a settlement in Sergiyevsky Selsoviet of Livensky District
- Mikhaylovsky, Orlovsky District, Oryol Oblast, a settlement in Zhilyayevsky Selsoviet of Orlovsky District
- Mikhaylovsky, Verkhovsky District, Oryol Oblast, a settlement in Vasilyevsky Selsoviet of Verkhovsky District

== Pskov Oblast ==
As of 2010, one rural locality in Pskov Oblast bears this name:

- Mikhaylovskoye, Pskov Oblast, a village in Kunyinsky District

== Rostov Oblast ==
As of 2010, two rural localities in Rostov Oblast bear this name:

- Mikhaylovsky, Konstantinovsky District, Rostov Oblast, a khutor under the administrative jurisdiction of Konstantinovskoye Urban Settlement of Konstantinovsky District
- Mikhaylovsky, Verkhnedonskoy District, Rostov Oblast, a khutor in Verkhnyakovskoye Rural Settlement of Verkhnedonskoy District

== Samara Oblast ==
As of 2010, one rural locality in Samara Oblast bears this name:

- Mikhaylovsky, Samara Oblast, a settlement in Kinelsky District

== Saratov Oblast ==
As of 2010, one rural locality in Saratov Oblast bears this name:

- Mikhaylovsky, Saratov Oblast, a closed settlement

== Smolensk Oblast ==
As of 2010, one rural locality in Smolensk Oblast bears this name:

- Mikhaylovskoye, Smolensk Oblast, a village in Baklanovskoye Rural Settlement of Demidovsky District

== Tula Oblast ==
As of 2010, nine rural localities in Tula Oblast bear this name:

- Mikhaylovsky, Chernsky District, Tula Oblast, a settlement in Popovskaya Rural Administration of Chernsky District
- Mikhaylovsky, Kamensky District, Tula Oblast, a settlement in Sitovsky Rural Okrug of Kamensky District
- Mikhaylovsky, Kimovsky District, Tula Oblast, a settlement in Khitrovshchinsky Rural Okrug of Kimovsky District
- Mikhaylovsky, Kurkinsky District, Tula Oblast, a settlement in Mikhaylovskaya Volost of Kurkinsky District
- Mikhaylovsky, Suvorovsky District, Tula Oblast, a settlement in Krasnomikhaylovskaya Rural Territory of Suvorovsky District
- Mikhaylovsky, Volovsky District, Tula Oblast, a settlement in Krasnodubrovsky Rural Okrug of Volovsky District
- Mikhaylovsky, Yefremovsky District, Tula Oblast, a settlement in Lobanovsky Rural Okrug of Yefremovsky District
- Mikhaylovskoye, Plavsky District, Tula Oblast, a selo in Gorbachevsky Rural Okrug of Plavsky District
- Mikhaylovskoye, Yasnogorsky District, Tula Oblast, a village in Pervomayskaya Rural Territory of Yasnogorsky District

== Tver Oblast ==
As of 2010, seven rural localities in Tver Oblast bear this name:

- Mikhaylovskoye (Vypolzovskoye Rural Settlement), Bologovsky District, Tver Oblast, a village in Bologovsky District; municipally, a part of Vypolzovskoye Rural Settlement of that district
- Mikhaylovskoye (Valdayskoye Rural Settlement), Bologovsky District, Tver Oblast, a village in Bologovsky District; municipally, a part of Valdayskoye Rural Settlement of that district
- Mikhaylovskoye, Kalininsky District, Tver Oblast, a selo in Kalininsky District
- Mikhaylovskoye, Lesnoy District, Tver Oblast, a selo in Lesnoy District
- Mikhaylovskoye, Likhoslavlsky District, Tver Oblast, a village in Likhoslavlsky District
- Mikhaylovskoye, Molokovsky District, Tver Oblast, a village in Molokovsky District
- Mikhaylovskoye, Toropetsky District, Tver Oblast, a village in Toropetsky District

== Udmurt Republic ==
As of 2010, one rural locality in the Udmurt Republic bears this name:

- Mikhaylovsky, Udmurt Republic, a pochinok in Shaberdinsky Selsoviet of Zavyalovsky District

== Vladimir Oblast ==
As of 2010, one rural locality in Vladimir Oblast bears this name:

- Mikhaylovskaya, Vladimir Oblast, a village in Gorokhovetsky District

== Volgograd Oblast ==
As of 2010, one rural locality in Volgograd Oblast bears this name:

- Mikhaylovskaya, Volgograd Oblast, a stanitsa in Mikhaylovsky Selsoviet of Uryupinsky District

== Vologda Oblast ==
As of 2010, ten rural localities in Vologda Oblast bear this name:

- Mikhaylovskoye, Cherepovetsky District, Vologda Oblast, a village in Shchetinsky Selsoviet of Cherepovetsky District
- Mikhaylovskoye, Kharovsky District, Vologda Oblast, a selo in Mikhaylovsky Selsoviet of Kharovsky District
- Mikhaylovskoye, Sheksninsky District, Vologda Oblast, a village in Churovsky Selsoviet of Sheksninsky District
- Mikhaylovskoye, Ustyuzhensky District, Vologda Oblast, a selo in Ustyuzhensky Selsoviet of Ustyuzhensky District
- Mikhaylovskaya, Kaduysky District, Vologda Oblast, a village in Nikolsky Selsoviet of Kaduysky District
- Mikhaylovskaya, Tarnogsky District, Vologda Oblast, a village in Ozeretsky Selsoviet of Tarnogsky District
- Mikhaylovskaya, Ust-Kubinsky District, Vologda Oblast, a village in Troitsky Selsoviet of Ust-Kubinsky District
- Mikhaylovskaya, Velikoustyugsky District, Vologda Oblast, a village in Pokrovsky Selsoviet of Velikoustyugsky District
- Mikhaylovskaya, Verkhovazhsky District, Vologda Oblast, a village in Morozovsky Selsoviet of Verkhovazhsky District
- Mikhaylovskaya, Vozhegodsky District, Vologda Oblast, a village in Ramensky Selsoviet of Vozhegodsky District

== Voronezh Oblast ==
As of 2010, four rural localities in Voronezh Oblast bear this name:

- Mikhaylovsky, Liskinsky District, Voronezh Oblast, a khutor in Petrovskoye Rural Settlement of Liskinsky District
- Mikhaylovsky, Novokhopyorsky District, Voronezh Oblast, a settlement in Mikhaylovskoye Rural Settlement of Novokhopyorsky District
- Mikhaylovsky, Paninsky District, Voronezh Oblast, a settlement in Mikhaylovskoye Rural Settlement of Paninsky District
- Mikhaylovsky, Talovsky District, Voronezh Oblast, a settlement in Voznesenovskoye Rural Settlement of Talovsky District

== Yaroslavl Oblast ==
As of 2010, nine rural localities in Yaroslavl Oblast bear this name:

- Mikhaylovsky, Yaroslavl Oblast, a settlement in Nekrasovsky Rural Okrug of Yaroslavsky District
- Mikhaylovskoye, Breytovsky District, Yaroslavl Oblast, a village in Pokrovo-Sitsky Rural Okrug of Breytovsky District
- Mikhaylovskoye, Lyubimsky District, Yaroslavl Oblast, a selo in Osetsky Rural Okrug of Lyubimsky District
- Mikhaylovskoye, Nekrasovsky District, Yaroslavl Oblast, a selo in Burmakinsky Rural Okrug of Nekrasovsky District
- Mikhaylovskoye, Rostovsky District, Yaroslavl Oblast, a village in Nikolsky Rural Okrug of Rostovsky District
- Mikhaylovskoye, Rybinsky District, Yaroslavl Oblast, a selo in Mikhaylovsky Rural Okrug of Rybinsky District
- Mikhaylovskoye, Tutayevsky District, Yaroslavl Oblast, a village in Chebakovsky Rural Okrug of Tutayevsky District
- Mikhaylovskoye, Kurbsky Rural Okrug, Yaroslavsky District, Yaroslavl Oblast, a selo in Kurbsky Rural Okrug of Yaroslavsky District
- Mikhaylovskoye, Tochishchensky Rural Okrug, Yaroslavsky District, Yaroslavl Oblast, a village in Tochishchensky Rural Okrug of Yaroslavsky District

== See also ==
- 5-go otdeleniya sovkhoza "Mikhaylovsky", a rural locality (a settlement) in Mikhaylovskoye Rural Settlement of Paninsky District of Voronezh Oblast
