= Zaozerye =

Zaozerye (Russian: Заозерье) is the name of several rural localities in Russia.

Zaozerye is a Russian word which translates to "place beyond the lake" or "land behind the lake".

== Arkhangelsk Oblast ==
As of 2010, ten rural localities in Arkhangelsk Oblast bear this name:

- Zaozerye, Khavrogorsky Selsoviet, Kholmogorsky District, Arkhangelsk Oblast, a village in Khavrogorsky Selsoviet of Kholmogorsky District
- Zaozerye, Matigorsky Selsoviet, Kholmogorsky District, Arkhangelsk Oblast, a village in Matigorsky Selsoviet of Kholmogorsky District
- Zaozerye, Konoshsky District, Arkhangelsk Oblast, a village in Klimovsky Selsoviet of Konoshsky District
- Zaozerye, Leshukonsky District, Arkhangelsk Oblast, a village in Nisogorsky Selsoviet of Leshukonsky District
- Zaozerye, Mezensky District, Arkhangelsk Oblast, a village in Lampozhensky Selsoviet of Mezensky District
- Zaozerye, Trufanogorsky Selsoviet, Pinezhsky District, Arkhangelsk Oblast, a village in Trufanogorsky Selsoviet of Pinezhsky District
- Zaozerye, Yurolsky Selsoviet, Pinezhsky District, Arkhangelsk Oblast, a village in Yurolsky Selsoviet of Pinezhsky District
- Zaozerye, Primorsky District, Arkhangelsk Oblast, a village in Lisestrovsky Selsoviet of Primorsky District
- Zaozerye, Verkhnetoyemsky District, Arkhangelsk Oblast, a village in Vyysky Selsoviet of Verkhnetoyemsky District
- Zaozerye, Vilegodsky District, Arkhangelsk Oblast, a village in Pavlovsky Selsoviet of Vilegodsky District

== Ivanovo Oblast ==
As of 2010, one rural locality in Ivanovo Oblast bears this name:

- Zaozerye, Ivanovo Oblast, a village in Savinsky District

== Kaliningrad Oblast ==
As of 2010, one rural locality in Kaliningrad Oblast bears this name:

- Zaozerye, Kaliningrad Oblast, a settlement in Nizovsky Rural Okrug of Guryevsky District

== Republic of Karelia ==
As of 2010, two rural localities in the Republic of Karelia bear this name:

- Zaozerye, Prionezhsky District, Republic of Karelia, a selo in Prionezhsky District
- Zaozerye, Pudozhsky District, Republic of Karelia, a village in Pudozhsky District

== Kirov Oblast ==
As of 2010, one rural locality in Kirov Oblast bears this name:

- Zaozerye, Kirov Oblast, a village in Smetaninsky Rural Okrug of Sanchursky District

== Komi Republic ==
As of 2010, two rural localities in the Komi Republic bear this name:

- Zaozerye (settlement), Komi Republic, a settlement in Zaozerye Rural-Type Settlement Administrative Territory of Sysolsky District
- Zaozerye (village), Komi Republic, a village in Zaozerye Rural-Type Settlement Administrative Territory of Sysolsky District

== Kostroma Oblast ==
As of 2010, one rural locality in Kostroma Oblast bears this name:

- Zaozerye, Kostroma Oblast, a khutor in Sandogorskoye Settlement of Kostromskoy District

== Leningrad Oblast ==
As of 2010, seven rural localities in Leningrad Oblast bear this name:

- Zaozerye, Gatchinsky District, Leningrad Oblast, a village in Druzhnogorskoye Settlement Municipal Formation of Gatchinsky District
- Zaozerye, Kingiseppsky District, Leningrad Oblast, a village in Nezhnovskoye Settlement Municipal Formation of Kingiseppsky District
- Zaozerye, Lodeynopolsky District, Leningrad Oblast, a village in Alekhovshchinskoye Settlement Municipal Formation of Lodeynopolsky District
- Zaozerye, Dzerzhinskoye Settlement Municipal Formation, Luzhsky District, Leningrad Oblast, a village in Dzerzhinskoye Settlement Municipal Formation of Luzhsky District
- Zaozerye, Volodarskoye Settlement Municipal Formation, Luzhsky District, Leningrad Oblast, a village in Volodarskoye Settlement Municipal Formation of Luzhsky District
- Zaozerye, Tolmachevskoye Settlement Municipal Formation, Luzhsky District, Leningrad Oblast, a village under the administrative jurisdiction of Tolmachevskoye Settlement Municipal Formation of Luzhsky District
- Zaozerye, Podporozhsky District, Leningrad Oblast, a village in Vazhinskoye Settlement Municipal Formation of Podporozhsky District

== Moscow Oblast ==
As of 2010, two rural localities in Moscow Oblast bear this name:

- Zaozerye, Pavlovo-Posadsky District, Moscow Oblast, a village in Kuznetsovskoye Rural Settlement of Pavlovo-Posadsky District
- Zaozerye, Ramensky District, Moscow Oblast, a village in Ostrovetskoye Rural Settlement of Ramensky District

== Nizhny Novgorod Oblast ==
As of 2010, two rural localities in Nizhny Novgorod Oblast bear this name:

- Zaozerye, Bogorodsky District, Nizhny Novgorod Oblast, a village in Dudenevsky Selsoviet of Bogorodsky District
- Zaozerye, Voskresensky District, Nizhny Novgorod Oblast, a village in Nestiarsky Selsoviet of Voskresensky District

== Novgorod Oblast ==
As of 2010, seven rural localities in Novgorod Oblast bear this name:

- Zaozerye, Demyansky District, Novgorod Oblast, a village in Pesotskoye Settlement of Demyansky District
- Zaozerye, Khvoyninsky District, Novgorod Oblast, a village in Ostakhnovskoye Settlement of Khvoyninsky District
- Zaozerye, Lyubytinsky District, Novgorod Oblast, a village under the administrative jurisdiction of the urban-type settlement of Lyubytino in Lyubytinsky District
- Zaozerye (railway station), Berezovikskoye Settlement, Okulovsky District, Novgorod Oblast, a railway station in Berezovikskoye Settlement of Okulovsky District
- Zaozerye (village), Berezovikskoye Settlement, Okulovsky District, Novgorod Oblast, a village in Berezovikskoye Settlement of Okulovsky District
- Zaozerye, Uglovka, Okulovsky District, Novgorod Oblast, a village under the administrative jurisdiction of the urban-type settlement of Uglovka in Okulovsky District
- Zaozerye, Poddorsky District, Novgorod Oblast, a village in Belebelkovskoye Settlement of Poddorsky District

== Perm Krai ==
As of 2010, four rural localities in Perm Krai bear this name:

- Zaozerye (Nikiforovskoye Rural Settlement), Chusovoy, Perm Krai, a village under the administrative jurisdiction of the town of krai significance of Chusovoy; municipally, a part of Nikiforovskoye Rural Settlement of Chusovskoy Municipal District
- Zaozerye (Verkhnekalinskoye Rural Settlement), Chusovoy, Perm Krai, a village under the administrative jurisdiction of the town of krai significance of Chusovoy; municipally, a part of Verkhnekalinskoye Rural Settlement of Chusovskoy Municipal District
- Zaozerye (Khokhlovskoye Rural Settlement), Permsky District, Perm Krai, a village in Permsky District; municipally, a part of Khokhlovskoye Rural Settlement of that district
- Zaozerye (Ust-Kachkinskoye Rural Settlement), Permsky District, Perm Krai, a village in Permsky District; municipally, a part of Ust-Kachkinskoye Rural Settlement of that district

== Pskov Oblast ==
As of 2010, eleven rural localities in Pskov Oblast bear this name:

- Zaozerye, Dedovichsky District, Pskov Oblast, a village in Dedovichsky District
- Zaozerye, Dedovichsky District, Pskov Oblast, a village in Dedovichsky District
- Zaozerye, Gdovsky District, Pskov Oblast, a village in Gdovsky District
- Zaozerye (Lyadskaya Rural Settlement), Plyussky District, Pskov Oblast, a village in Plyussky District; municipally, a part of Lyadskaya Rural Settlement of that district
- Zaozerye (Lyadskaya Rural Settlement), Plyussky District, Pskov Oblast, a village in Plyussky District; municipally, a part of Lyadskaya Rural Settlement of that district
- Zaozerye (Plyusskaya Rural Settlement), Plyussky District, Pskov Oblast, a village in Plyussky District; municipally, a part of Plyusskaya Rural Settlement of that district
- Zaozerye, Porkhovsky District, Pskov Oblast, a village in Porkhovsky District
- Zaozerye, Pustoshkinsky District, Pskov Oblast, a village in Pustoshkinsky District
- Zaozerye, Pytalovsky District, Pskov Oblast, a village in Pytalovsky District
- Zaozerye (Novoselskaya Rural Settlement), Strugo-Krasnensky District, Pskov Oblast, a village in Strugo-Krasnensky District; municipally, a part of Novoselskaya Rural Settlement of that district
- Zaozerye (Maryinskaya Rural Settlement), Strugo-Krasnensky District, Pskov Oblast, a village in Strugo-Krasnensky District; municipally, a part of Maryinskaya Rural Settlement of that district

== Rostov Oblast ==
As of 2010, one rural locality in Rostov Oblast bears this name:

- Zaozerye, Rostov Oblast, a settlement in Kommunarskoye Rural Settlement of Oktyabrsky District

== Smolensk Oblast ==
As of 2010, four rural localities in Smolensk Oblast bear this name:

- Zaozerye, Demidovsky District, Smolensk Oblast, a village in Baklanovskoye Rural Settlement of Demidovsky District
- Zaozerye, Rudnyansky District, Smolensk Oblast, a village in Perevolochskoye Rural Settlement of Rudnyansky District
- Zaozerye, Smolensky District, Smolensk Oblast, a village in Novoselskoye Rural Settlement of Smolensky District
- Zaozerye, Velizhsky District, Smolensk Oblast, a village in Zaozerskoye Rural Settlement of Velizhsky District

== Tver Oblast ==
As of 2010, eight rural localities in Tver Oblast bear this name:

- Zaozerye, Andreapolsky District, Tver Oblast, a village in Andreapolsky District
- Zaozerye, Andreapolsky District, Tver Oblast, a village in Andreapolsky District
- Zaozerye, Bologovsky District, Tver Oblast, a village in Bologovsky District
- Zaozerye, Kalininsky District, Tver Oblast, a village in Kalininsky District
- Zaozerye, Konakovsky District, Tver Oblast, a village in Konakovsky District
- Zaozerye (Shchuchyenskoye Rural Settlement), Ostashkovsky District, Tver Oblast, a village in Ostashkovsky District; municipally, a part of Shchuchyenskoye Rural Settlement of that district
- Zaozerye (Zaluchyenskoye Rural Settlement), Ostashkovsky District, Tver Oblast, a village in Ostashkovsky District; municipally, a part of Zaluchyenskoye Rural Settlement of that district
- Zaozerye, Selizharovsky District, Tver Oblast, a village in Selizharovsky District

== Vladimir Oblast ==
As of 2010, one rural locality in Vladimir Oblast bears this name:

- Zaozerye, Vladimir Oblast, a village in Gorokhovetsky District

== Vologda Oblast ==
As of 2010, four rural localities in Vologda Oblast bear this name:

- Zaozerye, Kaduysky District, Vologda Oblast, a village in Chuprinsky Selsoviet of Kaduysky District
- Zaozerye, Sheksninsky District, Vologda Oblast, a village in Yershovsky Selsoviet of Sheksninsky District
- Zaozerye, Velikoustyugsky District, Vologda Oblast, a village in Tregubovsky Selsoviet of Velikoustyugsky District
- Zaozerye, Vozhegodsky District, Vologda Oblast, a village in Nizhneslobodsky Selsoviet of Vozhegodsky District

== Yaroslavl Oblast ==
As of 2010, two rural localities in Yaroslavl Oblast bear this name:

- Zaozerye, Rostovsky District, Yaroslavl Oblast, a village in Itlarsky Rural Okrug of Rostovsky District
- Zaozerye, Uglichsky District, Yaroslavl Oblast, a selo in Zaozersky Rural Okrug of Uglichsky District
