= Balandino =

Balandino (Russian: Баландино) is the name of several rural localities in Russia:

- Balandino, Perm Krai, a village in Lobanovskoye Rural Settlement, Permsky District, Perm Krai
- Balandino, Vladimir Oblast, a village in Fominskoye Rural Settlement, Gorokhovetsky District, Vladimir Oblast
