= Slukino =

Slukino Слукино
- Village
- Location within Vladimir Oblast Location within Russia
- Coordinates: 56°11′N 42°38′E
- Country: Russia
- Region: Vladimir Oblast
- District: Gorokhovetsky District
- Time zone: UTC+3:00

Slukino (Russian: Слукино) is a rural locality (a village) in Kupriyanovskoye Rural Settlement, Gorokhovetsky District, Vladimir Oblast, Russia. The population was 21 as of 2010. There are 4 streets.

== Geography ==
Slukino is located on the Klyazma River, 5 km west of Gorokhovets (the district's administrative centre) by road. Gorodishchi is the nearest rural locality.
