= Ovinishchi =

Ovinishchi (Russian: Овинищи) is the name of several rural localities in Russia:

- Ovinishchi, Pytalovsky District, Pskov Oblast, a village in Pytalovsky District, Pskov Oblast
- Ovinishchi, Sebezhsky District, Pskov Oblast, a village in Sebezhsky District, Pskov Oblast
- Ovinishchi, Krasnokholmsky District, Tver Oblast, a village in Likhachevskoye Rural Settlement of Krasnokholmsky District of Tver Oblast
- Ovinishchi, Vesyegonsky District, Tver Oblast, a settlement in Kesemskoye Rural Settlement of Vesyegonsky District of Tver Oblast
- Ovinishchi, Vladimir Oblast, a village in Gorokhovetsky District of Vladimir Oblast
- Ovinishchi, Yaroslavl Oblast, a village in Shopshinsky Rural Okrug of Gavrilov-Yamsky District of Yaroslavl Oblast
