= Krutovo =

Krutovo Крутово
- Village
- Location within Vladimir Oblast Location within Russia
- Coordinates: 56°10′N 42°25′E
- Country: Russia
- Region: Vladimir Oblast
- District: Gorokhovetsky District
- Time zone: UTC+3:00

Krutovo (Russian: Крутово) is a rural locality (a village) in Denisovskoye Rural Settlement, Gorokhovetsky District, Vladimir Oblast, Russia. The population was 247 as of 2010. There are 2 streets.

== Geography ==
Krutovo is located 27 km west of Gorokhovets (the district's administrative centre) by road. Mitino is the nearest rural locality.
