= Rotkovo =

Rotkovo Ротьково
- Village
- Location within Vladimir Oblast Location within Russia
- Coordinates: 56°00′N 42°19′E
- Country: Russia
- Region: Vladimir Oblast
- District: Gorokhovetsky District
- Time zone: UTC+3:00

Rotkovo (Russian: Ротьково) is a rural locality (a village) in Fominskoye Rural Settlement, Gorokhovetsky District, Vladimir Oblast, Russia. The population was 3 as of 2010. The village has 2 streets.

== Geography ==
Rotkovo is located 38 km southwest of Gorokhovets (the district's administrative centre) by road. Grishino is the nearest rural locality.
