= Telepovo =

Telepovo Телепово
- Village
- Location within Vladimir Oblast Location within Russia
- Coordinates: 56°06′N 42°25′E
- Country: Russia
- Region: Vladimir Oblast
- District: Gorokhovetsky District
- Time zone: UTC+3:00

Telepovo (Russian: Телепово) is a rural locality (a village) in Denisovskoye Rural Settlement, Gorokhovetsky District, Vladimir Oblast, Russia. The population was 7 as of 2010.

== Geography ==
Telepovo is located 25 km southwest of Gorokhovets (the district's administrative centre) by road. Krasnaya Yablon is the nearest rural locality.
