= Vnukovo, Gorokhovetsky District, Vladimir Oblast =

Vnukovo Внуково
- Village
- Location within Vladimir Oblast Location within Russia
- Coordinates: 56°04′N 42°26′E
- Country: Russia
- Region: Vladimir Oblast
- District: Gorokhovetsky District
- Time zone: UTC+3:00

Vnukovo (Russian: Внуково) is a rural locality (a village) in Denisovskoye Rural Settlement, Gorokhovetsky District, Vladimir Oblast, Russia. The population was 5 in 2010.

== Geography ==
Vnukovo is located on the Ilinda River, 25 km southwest of Gorokhovets (the district's administrative centre) by road. Dubrovo is the nearest rural locality.
