= Gonchary =

Gonchary Гончары
- Village
- Location within Vladimir Oblast Location within Russia
- Coordinates: 56°00′N 42°29′E
- Country: Russia
- Region: Vladimir Oblast
- District: Gorokhovetsky District
- Time zone: UTC+3:00

Gonchary (Russian: Гончары) is a rural locality (a village) in Fominskoye Rural Settlement, Gorokhovetsky District, Vladimir Oblast, Russia. The population was 3 as of 2010.

== Geography ==
Gonchary is located 40 km southwest of Gorokhovets (the district's administrative centre) by road. Chudskaya is the nearest rural locality.
