= Murakovo =

Murakovo Мураково
- Village
- Location within Vladimir Oblast Location within Russia
- Coordinates: 56°07′N 42°32′E
- Country: Russia
- Region: Vladimir Oblast
- District: Gorokhovetsky District
- Time zone: UTC+3:00

Murakovo (Russian: Мураково) is a rural locality (a village) in Denisovskoye Rural Settlement, Gorokhovetsky District, Vladimir Oblast, Russia. The population was 5 as of 2010.

== Geography ==
Murakovo is located on the Singer Lake, 19 km southwest of Gorokhovets (the district's administrative centre) by road. Malaya Karpovka is the nearest rural locality.
