= Yurovo =

Yurovo Юрово
- Village
- Location within Vladimir Oblast Location within Russia
- Coordinates: 56°09′N 42°50′E
- Country: Russia
- Region: Vladimir Oblast
- District: Gorokhovetsky District
- Time zone: UTC+3:00

Yurovo (Russian: Юрово) is a rural locality (a village) in Kupriyanovskoye Rural Settlement, Gorokhovetsky District, Vladimir Oblast, Russia. The population was 206 as of 2010. There are 6 streets.

== Geography ==
Yurovo is located on the Suvoroshch River, 12 km southeast of Gorokhovets (the district's administrative centre) by road. Semyonovka is the nearest rural locality.
