= Krasnaya Yablon =

Krasnaya Yablon Красная Яблонь
- Village
- Location within Vladimir Oblast Location within Russia
- Coordinates: 56°06′N 42°26′E
- Country: Russia
- Region: Vladimir Oblast
- District: Gorokhovetsky District
- Time zone: UTC+3:00

Krasnaya Yablon (Russian: Красная Яблонь) is a rural locality (a village) in Denisovskoye Rural Settlement, Gorokhovetsky District, Vladimir Oblast, Russia. The population was five people as of 2010.

== Geography ==
Krasnaya Yablon is located 24 km southwest of Gorokhovets (the district's administrative centre) by road. Telepovo is the nearest rural locality.
