= Misyurevo =

Misyurevo Мисюрево
- Village
- Location within Vladimir Oblast Location within Russia
- Coordinates: 56°09′N 42°28′E
- Country: Russia
- Region: Vladimir Oblast
- District: Gorokhovetsky District
- Time zone: UTC+3:00

Misyurevo (Russian: Мисюрево) is a rural locality (a village) in Kupriyanovskoye Rural Settlement, Gorokhovetsky District, Vladimir Oblast, Russia. The population was 2 as of 2010.

== Geography ==
Misyurevo is located on the Klyazma River, 18 km west of Gorokhovets (the district's administrative centre) by road. Sofryaki is the nearest rural locality.
