= Kopsovo =

Kopsovo Копсово
- Village
- Location within Vladimir Oblast Location within Russia
- Coordinates: 56°10′N 42°54′E
- Country: Russia
- Region: Vladimir Oblast
- District: Gorokhovetsky District
- Time zone: UTC+3:00

Kopsovo (Russian: Копсово) is a rural locality (a village) in Kupriyanovskoye Rural Settlement, Gorokhovetsky District, Vladimir Oblast, Russia. The population was 6 as of 2010.

== Geography ==
Kopsovo is located 17 km southeast of Gorokhovets (the district's administrative centre) by road. Krylovo is the nearest rural locality.
