= Shankovo =

Shankovo Шаньково
- Village
- Location within Vladimir Oblast Location within Russia
- Coordinates: 56°08′N 42°47′E
- Country: Russia
- Region: Vladimir Oblast
- District: Gorokhovetsky District
- Time zone: UTC+3:00

Shankovo (Russian: Шаньково) is a rural locality (a village) in Kupriyanovskoye Rural Settlement, Gorokhovetsky District, Vladimir Oblast, Russia. The population was 18 as of 2010.

== Geography ==
Shankovo is located on the Suvoroshch River, 16 km southeast of Gorokhovets (the district's administrative centre) by road. Timiryazevo is the nearest rural locality.
