= Gornoye Tatarintsevo =

Gornoye Tatarintsevo Горное Татаринцево
- Village
- Location within Vladimir Oblast Location within Russia
- Coordinates: 56°09′N 42°24′E
- Country: Russia
- Region: Vladimir Oblast
- District: Gorokhovetsky District
- Time zone: UTC+3:00

Gornoye Tatarintsevo (Russian: Горное Татаринцево) is a rural locality (a village) in Denisovskoye Rural Settlement, Gorokhovetsky District, Vladimir Oblast, Russia. The population was 4 as of 2010.

== Geography ==
Gornoye Tatarintsevo is located 21 km west of Gorokhovets (the district's administrative centre) by road. Petrunino is the nearest rural locality.
