= Vyezd =

Vyezd Выезд
- Village
- Location within Vladimir Oblast Location within Russia
- Coordinates: 56°09′N 42°41′E
- Country: Russia
- Region: Vladimir Oblast
- District: Gorokhovetsky District
- Time zone: UTC+3:00

Vyezd (Russian: Выезд) is a rural locality (a village) and the administrative center of Kupriyanovskoye Rural Settlement, Gorokhovetsky District, Vladimir Oblast, Russia. The population was 257 as of 2010. There are 3 streets.

== Geography ==
Vyezd is located 5 km south of Gorokhovets (the district's administrative centre) by road. Morozovka is the nearest rural locality.
