= Byltsyno =

Byltsyno Быльцыно
- Village
- Location within Vladimir Oblast Location within Russia
- Coordinates: 56°07′N 42°31′E
- Country: Russia
- Region: Vladimir Oblast
- District: Gorokhovetsky District
- Time zone: UTC+3:00

Byltsyno (Russian: Быльцыно) is a rural locality (a village) in Denisovskoye Rural Settlement, Gorokhovetsky District, Vladimir Oblast, Russia. The population was 1 as of 2010.

== Geography ==
Byltsyno is located on the Vazhnya River, 23 km (14 mi) southwest of Gorokhovets (the district's administrative centre) by road. Otvodnoye is the nearest rural locality.
