= Litovka =

Litovka Литовка
- Village
- Location within Vladimir Oblast Location within Russia
- Coordinates: 56°09′N 42°30′E
- Country: Russia
- Region: Vladimir Oblast
- District: Gorokhovetsky District
- Time zone: UTC+3:00

Litovka (Russian: Литовка) is a rural locality (a village) in Kupriyanovskoye Rural Settlement, Gorokhovetsky District, Vladimir Oblast, Russia. The population was 16 as of 2010.

== Geography ==
Litovka is located 15 km west of Gorokhovets (the district's administrative centre) by road. Gavriltsevo is the nearest rural locality.
