= Svetilnovo =

Svetilnovo Светильново
- Village
- Location within Vladimir Oblast Location within Russia
- Coordinates: 56°09′N 42°47′E
- Country: Russia
- Region: Vladimir Oblast
- District: Gorokhovetsky District
- Time zone: UTC+3:00

Svetilnovo (Russian: Светильново) is a rural locality (a village) in Kupriyanovskoye Rural Settlement, Gorokhovetsky District, Vladimir Oblast, Russia. The population was 8 as of 2010. There are 2 streets.

== Geography ==
Svetilnovo is located 10 km southeast of Gorokhovets (the district's administrative centre) by road. Velikovo is the nearest rural locality.
