= Rozhdestveno, Gorokhovetsky District, Vladimir Oblast =

Rozhdestveno Рождествено
- Village
- Location within Vladimir Oblast Location within Russia
- Coordinates: 55°55′N 42°28′E
- Country: Russia
- Region: Vladimir Oblast
- District: Gorokhovetsky District
- Time zone: UTC+3:00

Rozhdestveno (Russian: Рождествено) is a rural locality (a village) in Fominskoye Rural Settlement, Gorokhovetsky District, Vladimir Oblast, Russia. The population was 48 as of 2010. There are 3 streets.

== Geography ==
Rozhdestveno is located on the Visha River, 47 km south of Gorokhovets (the district's administrative centre) by road. Istomino is the nearest rural locality.
