= Zykovo =

Zykovo Зыково
- Village
- Location within Vladimir Oblast Location within Russia
- Coordinates: 56°00′N 42°22′E
- Country: Russia
- Region: Vladimir Oblast
- District: Gorokhovetsky District
- Time zone: UTC+3:00

Zykovo (Russian: Зыково) is a rural locality (a village) in Fominskoye Rural Settlement, Gorokhovetsky District, Vladimir Oblast, Russia. The population was 2 as of 2010.

== Geography ==
Zykovo is located 35 km southwest of Gorokhovets (the district's administrative centre) by road. Prosye is the nearest rural locality.
