= Veretenkovo =

Veretenkovo Веретеньково
- Village
- Location within Vladimir Oblast Location within Russia
- Coordinates: 56°06′N 42°17′E
- Country: Russia
- Region: Vladimir Oblast
- District: Gorokhovetsky District
- Time zone: UTC+3:00

Veretenkovo (Russian: Веретеньково) is a rural locality (a village) in Denisovskoye Rural Settlement, Gorokhovetsky District, Vladimir Oblast, Russia. The population was 12 as of 2010.

== Geography ==
Veretenkovo is located 33 km southwest of Gorokhovets (the district's administrative centre) by road. Proletarsky is the nearest rural locality.
