= Alfyorovo, Gorokhovetsky District, Vladimir Oblast =

Alfyorovo Алфёрово
- Village
- Location within Vladimir Oblast Location within Russia
- Coordinates: 56°07′N 42°28′E
- Country: Russia
- Region: Vladimir Oblast
- District: Gorokhovetsky District
- Time zone: UTC+3:00

Alfyorovo (Russian: Алфёрово) is a rural locality (a village) in Denisovskoye Rural Settlement, Gorokhovetsky District, Vladimir Oblast, Russia. The population was 2 as of 2010.

== Geography ==
Alfyorovo is located 20 km (12 mi) southwest of Gorokhovets (the district's administrative centre) by road. Leonovo is the nearest rural locality.
