= Sapunovo =

Sapunovo Сапуново
- Village
- Location within Vladimir Oblast Location within Russia
- Coordinates: 56°06′N 42°40′E
- Country: Russia
- Region: Vladimir Oblast
- District: Gorokhovetsky District
- Time zone: UTC+3:00

Sapunovo (Russian: Сапуново) is a rural locality (a village) in Kupriyanovskoye Rural Settlement, Gorokhovetsky District, Vladimir Oblast, Russia. The population was 16 as of 2010.

== Geography ==
Sapunovo is located 14 km south of Gorokhovets (the district's administrative centre) by road. Pogost is the nearest rural locality.
