= Shubino =

Shubino Шубино
- Village
- Location within Vladimir Oblast Location within Russia
- Coordinates: 56°04′N 42°35′E
- Country: Russia
- Region: Vladimir Oblast
- District: Gorokhovetsky District
- Time zone: UTC+3:00

Shubino (Russian: Шубино) is a rural locality (a village) in Denisovskoye Rural Settlement, Gorokhovetsky District, Vladimir Oblast, Russia. The population was 8 as of 2010.

== Geography ==
Shubino is located 19 km southwest of Gorokhovets (the district's administrative centre) by road. Yakutino is the nearest rural locality.
