= Rastrigino =

Rastrigino Растригино
- Village
- Location within Vladimir Oblast Location within Russia
- Coordinates: 55°59′N 42°24′E
- Country: Russia
- Region: Vladimir Oblast
- District: Gorokhovetsky District
- Time zone: UTC+3:00

Rastrigino (Russian: Растригино) is a rural locality (a village) in Fominskoye Rural Settlement, Gorokhovetsky District, Vladimir Oblast, Russia. The population was 37 as of 2010.

== Geography ==
Rastrigino is located 36 km southwest of Gorokhovets (the district's administrative centre) by road. Pochinki is the nearest rural locality.
