= Kondyurino =

Kondyurino Кондюрино
- Village
- Location within Vladimir Oblast Location within Russia
- Coordinates: 56°11′N 42°46′E
- Country: Russia
- Region: Vladimir Oblast
- District: Gorokhovetsky District
- Time zone: UTC+3:00

Kondyurino (Russian: Кондюрино) is a rural locality (a village) in Kupriyanovskoye Rural Settlement, Gorokhovetsky District, Vladimir Oblast, Russia. The population was 86 as of 2010.

== Geography ==
Kondyurino is located 6 km southeast of Gorokhovets (the district's administrative centre) by road. Kruglovo is the nearest rural locality.
