= Kupriyanovo, Vladimir Oblast =

Kupriyanovo Куприяново
- Village
- Location within Vladimir Oblast Location within Russia
- Coordinates: 56°08′N 42°41′E
- Country: Russia
- Region: Vladimir Oblast
- District: Gorokhovetsky District
- Time zone: UTC+3:00

Kupriyanovo (Russian: Куприяново) is a rural locality (a village) in Kupriyanovskoye Rural Settlement, Gorokhovetsky District, Vladimir Oblast, Russia. The population was 157 as of 2010. There are 3 streets.

== Geography ==
Kupriyanovo is located 8 km south of Gorokhovets (the district's administrative centre) by road. Vetelnitsy is the nearest rural locality.
