= Chulkovo =

Chulkovo (Russian: Чулково) may refer to the following localities in Russia:

- Chulkovo, Nizhny Novgorod Oblast
- Chulkovo, Oryol Oblast
- Chulkovo, Krasnoyarsk Krai
- Chulkovo, Leningrad Oblast
- Chulkovo, Moscow Oblast
- Chulkovo, Omsk Oblast
- Chulkovo (village), Vladimir Oblast
- Chulkovo (settlement), Vladimir Oblast
- Chulkovo, Vologda Oblast
