= Manylovo =

Manylovo Манылово
- Village
- Location within Vladimir Oblast Location within Russia
- Coordinates: 56°06′N 42°37′E
- Country: Russia
- Region: Vladimir Oblast
- District: Gorokhovetsky District
- Time zone: UTC+3:00

Manylovo (Russian: Манылово) is a rural locality (a village) in Kupriyanovskoye Rural Settlement, Gorokhovetsky District, Vladimir Oblast, Russia. The population was 13 as of 2010.

== Geography ==
Manylovo is located on the Vazhnya River, 14 km southwest of Gorokhovets (the district's administrative centre) by road. Molodniki is the nearest rural locality.
