= Chudskaya =

Chudskaya Чудская
- Village
- Location within Vladimir Oblast Location within Russia
- Coordinates: 56°00′N 42°26′E
- Country: Russia
- Region: Vladimir Oblast
- District: Gorokhovetsky District
- Time zone: UTC+3:00

Chudskaya (Russian: Чудская) is a rural locality (a village) in Fominskoye Rural Settlement, Gorokhovetsky District, Vladimir Oblast, Russia. The population was 9 as of 2010.

== Geography ==
Chudskaya is located 36 km southwest of Gorokhovets (the district's administrative centre) by road. Gonchary is the nearest rural locality.
