= Zolotovo =

Zolotovo Золотово
- Village
- Location within Vladimir Oblast Location within Russia
- Coordinates: 56°01′N 42°13′E
- Country: Russia
- Region: Vladimir Oblast
- District: Gorokhovetsky District
- Time zone: UTC+3:00

Zolotovo (Russian: Золотово) is a rural locality (a village) in Fominskoye Rural Settlement, Gorokhovetsky District, Vladimir Oblast, Russia. The population was 46 as of 2010. There are 4 streets.

== Geography ==
Zolotovo is located on the Indrus River, 47 km southwest of Gorokhovets (the district's administrative centre) by road. Myasnikovo is the nearest rural locality.
