= Leonovo =

Leonovo Леоново
- Village
- Location within Vladimir Oblast Location within Russia
- Coordinates: 56°08′N 42°29′E
- Country: Russia
- Region: Vladimir Oblast
- District: Gorokhovetsky District
- Time zone: UTC+3:00

Leonovo (Russian: Леоново) is a rural locality (a village) in Denisovskoye Rural Settlement, Gorokhovetsky District, Vladimir Oblast, Russia. The population was 2 as of 2010.

== Geography ==
Leonovo is located 21 km southwest of Gorokhovets (the district's administrative centre) by road. Alferovo is the nearest rural locality.
