= Vamna =

Vamna Вамна
- Village
- Location within Vladimir Oblast Location within Russia
- Coordinates: 55°53′N 42°14′E
- Country: Russia
- Region: Vladimir Oblast
- District: Gorokhovetsky District
- Time zone: UTC+3:00

Vamna (Russian: Вамна) is a rural locality (a village) in Fominskoye Rural Settlement, Gorokhovetsky District, Vladimir Oblast, Russia. The population was 10 as of 2010.

== Geography ==
Vamna is located 53 km southwest of Gorokhovets (the district's administrative centre) by road. Taranovo is the nearest rural locality.
