= Kolesnikovo =

Kolesnikovo Колесниково
- Village
- Location within Vladimir Oblast Location within Russia
- Coordinates: 56°08′N 42°25′E
- Country: Russia
- Region: Vladimir Oblast
- District: Gorokhovetsky District
- Time zone: UTC+3:00

Kolesnikovo (Russian: Колесниково) is a rural locality (a village) in Denisovskoye Rural Settlement, Gorokhovetsky District, Vladimir Oblast, Russia. The population was 29 as of 2010.

== Geography ==
Kolesnikovo is located 23 km southwest of Gorokhovets (the district's administrative centre) by road. Korovkino is the nearest rural locality.
