= Melkishevo =

Melkishevo Мелкишево
- Village
- Location within Vladimir Oblast Location within Russia
- Coordinates: 56°04′N 42°30′E
- Country: Russia
- Region: Vladimir Oblast
- District: Gorokhovetsky District
- Time zone: UTC+3:00

Melkishevo (Russian: Мелкишево) is a rural locality (a village) in Denisovskoye Rural Settlement, Gorokhovetsky District, Vladimir Oblast, Russia. The population was 12 as of 2010.

== Geography ==
Melkishevo is located 25 km southwest of Gorokhovets (the district's administrative centre) by road. Kozhino is the nearest rural locality.
