= Pavlikovo =

Pavlikovo Павликово
- Village
- Location within Vladimir Oblast Location within Russia
- Coordinates: 55°59′N 42°34′E
- Country: Russia
- Region: Vladimir Oblast
- District: Gorokhovetsky District
- Time zone: UTC+3:00

Pavlikovo (Russian: Павликово) is a rural locality (a village) in Fominskoye Rural Settlement, Gorokhovetsky District, Vladimir Oblast, Russia. The population was 13 as of 2010. There are 2 streets.

== Geography ==
Pavlikovo is located on the Chucha River, 57 km south of Gorokhovets (the district's administrative centre) by road. Povalikhino is the nearest rural locality.
