= Torfopredpriyatiya Bolshoye =

Torfopredpriyatiya Bolshoye Торфопредприятия «Большое»
- Settlement
- Location within Vladimir Oblast Location within Russia
- Coordinates: 56°05′N 42°41′E
- Country: Russia
- Region: Vladimir Oblast
- District: Gorokhovetsky District
- Time zone: UTC+3:00

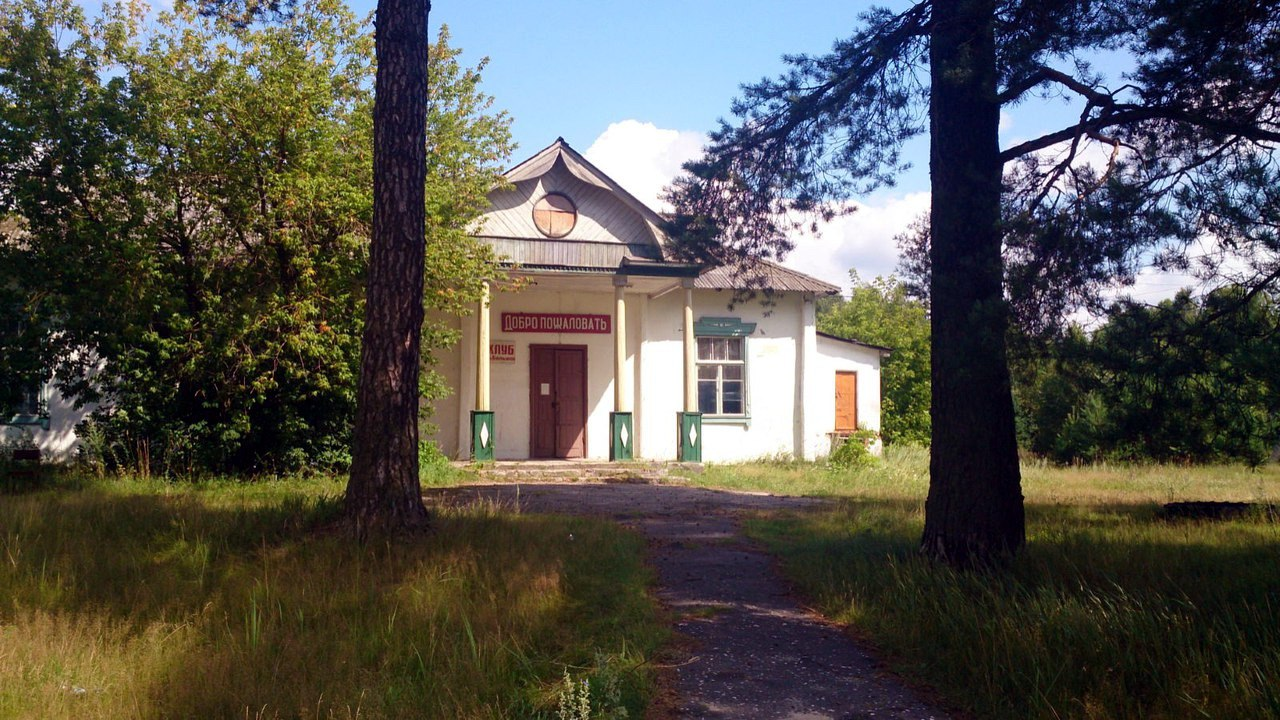
Torfopredpriyatiya Clubhouse

Torfopredpriyatiya Bolshoye (Russian: Торфопредприятия «Большое») is a rural locality (a settlement) in Kupriyanovskoye Rural Settlement, Gorokhovetsky District, Vladimir Oblast, Russia. The population was 162 as of 2010. There are 6 streets.

== Geography ==
Torfopredpriyatiya Bolshoye is located 16 km south of Gorokhovets (the district's administrative centre) by road. Sapunovo is the nearest rural locality.
