= Bereznitsy =

Bereznitsy Березницы
- Village
- Location within Vladimir Oblast Location within Russia
- Coordinates: 56°03′50″N 42°30′24″E
- Country: Russia
- Region: Vladimir Oblast
- District: Gorokhovetsky District
- Time zone: UTC+3:00

Bereznitsy (Russian: Березницы) is a rural locality (a village) in Denisovskoye Rural Settlement, Gorokhovetsky District, Vladimir Oblast, Russia. The population was 4 as of 2010.

== Geography ==
Bereznitsy is located 27 km (17 mi) southwest of Gorokhovets (the district's administrative centre) by road. Melkishevo is the nearest rural locality.
