= Mitino, Gorokhovetsky District, Vladimir Oblast =

Mitino Митино
- Village
- Location within Vladimir Oblast Location within Russia
- Coordinates: 56°10′N 42°24′E
- Country: Russia
- Region: Vladimir Oblast
- District: Gorokhovetsky District
- Time zone: UTC+3:00

Mitino (Russian: Митино) is a rural locality (a village) in Denisovskoye Rural Settlement, Gorokhovetsky District, Vladimir Oblast, Russia. The population was 9 as of 2010.

== Geography ==
Mitino is located 26 km west of Gorokhovets (the district's administrative centre) by road. Krutovo is the nearest rural locality.
