= Bykasovo =

Bykasovo Быкасово
- Village
- Location within Vladimir Oblast Location within Russia
- Coordinates: 55°57′N 42°35′E
- Country: Russia
- Region: Vladimir Oblast
- District: Gorokhovetsky District
- Time zone: UTC+3:00

Bykasovo (Russian: Быкасово) is a rural locality (a village) in Fominskoye Rural Settlement, Gorokhovetsky District, Vladimir Oblast, Russia. The population was 215 as of 2010. There are 6 streets.

== Geography ==
Bykasovo is located on the Chucha River, 57 km southwest of Gorokhovets (the district's administrative centre) by road. Chernenkovo is the nearest rural locality.
