= Lykshino =

Lykshino Лыкшино
- Village
- Location within Vladimir Oblast Location within Russia
- Coordinates: 56°07′N 42°48′E
- Country: Russia
- Region: Vladimir Oblast
- District: Gorokhovetsky District
- Time zone: UTC+3:00

Lykshino (Russian: Лыкшино) is a rural locality (a village) in Kupriyanovskoye Rural Settlement, Gorokhovetsky District, Vladimir Oblast, Russia. The population was 12 as of 2010.

== Geography ==
Lykshino is located on the Suvoroshch, 15 km southeast of Gorokhovets (the district's administrative centre) by road. Gruzdevsky is the nearest rural locality.
