= Taranovo =

Taranovo Тараново
- Village
- Location within Vladimir Oblast Location within Russia
- Coordinates: 55°54′N 42°15′E
- Country: Russia
- Region: Vladimir Oblast
- District: Gorokhovetsky District
- Time zone: UTC+3:00

Taranovo (Russian: Тараново) is a rural locality (a village) in Fominskoye Rural Settlement, Gorokhovetsky District, Vladimir Oblast, Russia. The population was 13 as of 2010.

== Geography ==
Taranovo is located 51 km southwest of Gorokhovets (the district's administrative centre) by road. Lisino is the nearest rural locality.
