= Mikhaylovskaya, Vladimir Oblast =

Mikhaylovskaya Михайловская
- Village
- Location within Vladimir Oblast Location within Russia
- Coordinates: 56°03′N 42°22′E
- Country: Russia
- Region: Vladimir Oblast
- District: Gorokhovetsky District
- Time zone: UTC+3:00

Mikhaylovskaya (Russian: Михайловская) is a rural locality (a village) in Denisovskoye Rural Settlement, Gorokhovetsky District, Vladimir Oblast, Russia. The population was 11 as of 2010.

== Geography ==
The village is located 7 km south from Proletarsky, 32 km south-west from Gorokhovets.
