= Galitsy =

Galitsy Галицы
- Settlement
- Location within Vladimir Oblast Location within Russia
- Coordinates: 56°10′N 42°50′E
- Country: Russia
- Region: Vladimir Oblast
- District: Gorokhovetsky District
- Time zone: UTC+3:00

Galitsy (Russian: Галицы) is a rural locality (a settlement) in Kupriyanovskoye Rural Settlement, Gorokhovetsky District, Vladimir Oblast, Russia. The population was 850 as of 2010. There are 23 streets.

== Geography ==
Galitsy is located between Klyazma and Suvoroshch Rivers, 12 km southeast of Gorokhovets (the district's administrative centre) by road. Semyonovka is the nearest rural locality.
