= Kartaganovo =

Kartaganovo Картаганово
- Village
- Location within Vladimir Oblast Location within Russia
- Coordinates: 56°10′N 42°52′E
- Country: Russia
- Region: Vladimir Oblast
- District: Gorokhovetsky District
- Time zone: UTC+3:00

Kartaganovo (Russian: Картаганово) is a rural locality (a village) in Kupriyanovskoye Rural Settlement, Gorokhovetsky District, Vladimir Oblast, Russia. The population was 5 as of 2010.

== Geography ==
Kartaganovo is located 15 km southeast of Gorokhovets (the district's administrative centre) by road. Krylovo is the nearest rural locality.
