= Novovladimirovka =

Novovladimirovka Нововладимировка
- Village
- Location within Vladimir Oblast Location within Russia
- Coordinates: 56°08′N 42°36′E
- Country: Russia
- Region: Vladimir Oblast
- District: Gorokhovetsky District
- Time zone: UTC+3:00

Novovladimirovka (Russian: Нововладимировка) is a rural locality (a village) in Kupriyanovskoye Rural Settlement, Gorokhovetsky District, Vladimir Oblast, Russia. The population was 65 as of 2010.

== Geography ==
Novovladimirovka is located 10 km southwest of Gorokhovets (the district's administrative centre) by road. Kuplya is the nearest rural locality.
