= Petrunino, Vladimir Oblast =

Village in Vladimir Oblast, Russia

Petrunino Петрунино
- Village
- Location within Vladimir Oblast Location within Russia
- Coordinates: 56°09′N 42°23′E
- Country: Russia
- Region: Vladimir Oblast
- District: Gorokhovetsky District
- Time zone: UTC+3:00

Petrunino (Russian: Петрунино) is a rural locality (a village) in Denisovskoye Rural Settlement, Gorokhovetsky District, Vladimir Oblast, Russia. The population was 3 as of 2010.

== Geography ==
Petrunino is located 24 km west of Gorokhovets (the district's administrative centre) by road. Gornoye Tatarintsevo is the nearest rural locality.
