= Ivachevo, Vladimir Oblast =

Ivachevo Ивачево
- Village
- Location within Vladimir Oblast Location within Russia
- Coordinates: 55°56′N 42°30′E
- Country: Russia
- Region: Vladimir Oblast
- District: Gorokhovetsky District
- Time zone: UTC+3:00

Ivachevo (Russian: Ивачево) is a rural locality (a village) in Fominskoye Rural Settlement, Gorokhovetsky District, Vladimir Oblast, Russia. The population was 72 as of 2010. There are 4 streets.

== Geography ==
Ivachevo is located 51 km southwest of Gorokhovets (the district's administrative centre) by road. Rozhdestveno is the nearest rural locality.
