= Knyazhichi =

Knyazhichi Княжичи
- Village
- Location within Vladimir Oblast Location within Russia
- Coordinates: 56°10′N 42°37′E
- Country: Russia
- Region: Vladimir Oblast
- District: Gorokhovetsky District
- Time zone: UTC+3:00

Knyazhichi (Russian: Княжичи) is a rural locality (a village) in Kupriyanovskoye Rural Settlement, Gorokhovetsky District, Vladimir Oblast, Russia. The population was 2 as of 2010.

== Geography ==
Knyazhichi is located 18 km southwest of Gorokhovets (the district's administrative centre) by road. Arefino is the nearest rural locality.
