= Molodniki =

Molodniki Молодники
- Village
- Location within Vladimir Oblast Location within Russia
- Coordinates: 56°07′N 42°38′E
- Country: Russia
- Region: Vladimir Oblast
- District: Gorokhovetsky District
- Time zone: UTC+3:00

Molodniki (Russian: Молодники) is a rural locality (a village) in Kupriyanovskoye Rural Settlement, Gorokhovetsky District, Vladimir Oblast, Russia. The population was 3 as of 2010.

== Geography ==
Molodniki is located on the Sukhodol River, 13 km south of Gorokhovets (the district's administrative centre) by road. Pogost is the nearest rural locality.
