= Grishino, Gorokhovetsky District, Vladimir Oblast =

Grishino Гришино
- Selo
- Location within Vladimir Oblast Location within Russia
- Coordinates: 56°00′N 42°17′E
- Country: Russia
- Region: Vladimir Oblast
- District: Gorokhovetsky District
- Time zone: UTC+3:00

Grishino (Russian: Гри́шино) is a rural locality (a selo) in Fominskoye Rural Settlement, Gorokhovetsky District, Vladimir Oblast, Russia. The population was 263 as of 2010. There are 5 streets.

== Geography ==
Grishino is located 41 km southwest of Gorokhovets (the district's administrative centre) by road. Rotkovo is the nearest rural locality.
