= Lesnoye Tatarintsevo =

Lesnoye Tatarintsevo Лесное Татаринцево
- Village
- Location within Vladimir Oblast Location within Russia
- Coordinates: 56°05′N 42°22′E
- Country: Russia
- Region: Vladimir Oblast
- District: Gorokhovetsky District
- Time zone: UTC+3:00

Lesnoye Tatarintsevo (Russian: Лесное Татаринцево) is a rural locality (a village) in Denisovskoye Rural Settlement, Gorokhovetsky District, Vladimir Oblast, Russia. The population was 4 as of 2010.

== Geography ==
Lesnoye Tatarintsevo is located 32 km southwest of Gorokhovets (the district's administrative centre) by road. Denisovo is the nearest rural locality.
