= Vasenino =

Vasenino Васенино
- Village
- Location within Vladimir Oblast Location within Russia
- Coordinates: 56°05′N 42°16′E
- Country: Russia
- Region: Vladimir Oblast
- District: Gorokhovetsky District
- Time zone: UTC+3:00

Vasenino (Russian: Васенино) is a rural locality (a village) in Denisovskoye Rural Settlement, Gorokhovetsky District, Vladimir Oblast, Russia. The population was 9 as of 2010.

== Geography ==
Vasenino is located on the Shumar River, 35 km southwest of Gorokhovets (the district's administrative centre) by road. Veretenkovo is the nearest rural locality.
