= Chernenkovo =

Chernenkovo Черненково
- Village
- Location within Vladimir Oblast Location within Russia
- Coordinates: 55°59′N 42°33′E
- Country: Russia
- Region: Vladimir Oblast
- District: Gorokhovetsky District
- Time zone: UTC+3:00

Chernenkovo (Russian: Черненково) is a rural locality (a village) in Fominskoye Rural Settlement, Gorokhovetsky District, Vladimir Oblast, Russia. The population was 2 as of 2010.

== Geography ==
Chernenkovo is located 57 km south of Gorokhovets (the district's administrative centre) by road. Povalikhino is the nearest rural locality.
