= Bolshoye Sokurovo =

Bolshoye Sokurovo Большое Сокурово
- Village
- Location within Vladimir Oblast Location within Russia
- Coordinates: 56°09′N 42°20′E
- Country: Russia
- Region: Vladimir Oblast
- District: Gorokhovetsky District
- Time zone: UTC+3:00

Bolshoye Sokurovo (Russian: Большое Сокурово) is a rural locality (a village) in Denisovskoye Rural Settlement, Gorokhovetsky District, Vladimir Oblast, Russia. The population was 34 as of 2010.

== Geography ==
Bolshoye Sokurovo is located on the Trema River, 35 km west of Gorokhovets (the district's administrative centre) by road. Maloye Sokurovo is the nearest rural locality.
