= Arefino =

Arefino Арефино
- Village
- Location within Vladimir Oblast Location within Russia
- Coordinates: 56°10′N 42°38′E
- Country: Russia
- Region: Vladimir Oblast
- District: Gorokhovetsky District
- Time zone: UTC+3:00

Arefino (Russian: Арефино) is a rural locality (a village) that is situated in the Kupriyanovskoye Rural Settlement of Gorokhovetsky District, Vladimir Oblast, Russia. The population was 401 as of 2010. There are 4 streets.

== Geography ==
Arefino is located 19 km (12 mi) southwest of Gorokhovets (the district's administrative centre) by road. Knyazhichi is the nearest rural locality.

== Paleontology ==
The fossil of temnospondyl amphibian Tupilakosaurus was found in the lower Triassic (Lower Induan) deposits of Arefino.
