= Svyato =

Svyato Свято
- Selo
- Location within Vladimir Oblast Location within Russia
- Coordinates: 55°55′N 42°13′E
- Country: Russia
- Region: Vladimir Oblast
- District: Gorokhovetsky District
- Time zone: UTC+3:00

Svyato (Russian: Свято) is a rural locality (a selo) in Fominskoye Rural Settlement, Gorokhovetsky District, Vladimir Oblast, Russia. The population was 8 as of 2010.

== Geography ==
Svyato is located 49 km southwest of Gorokhovets (the district's administrative centre) by road. Gorlovka is the nearest rural locality.
