= Otvodnoye =

Otvodnoye Отводное
- Village
- Location within Vladimir Oblast Location within Russia
- Coordinates: 56°05′N 42°29′E
- Country: Russia
- Region: Vladimir Oblast
- District: Gorokhovetsky District
- Time zone: UTC+3:00

Otvodnoye (Russian: Отводное) is a rural locality (a village) in Denisovskoye Rural Settlement, Gorokhovetsky District, Vladimir Oblast, Russia. The population was 53 as of 2010. There are 2 streets.

== Geography ==
Otvodnoye is located on the Kurzha River, 23 km southwest of Gorokhovets (the district's administrative centre) by road. Chulkovo is the nearest rural locality.
