= Slobodishchi =

Slobodishchi Слободищи
- Village
- Location within Vladimir Oblast Location within Russia
- Coordinates: 56°10′N 42°26′E
- Country: Russia
- Region: Vladimir Oblast
- District: Gorokhovetsky District
- Time zone: UTC+3:00

Slobodishchi (Russian: Слободищи) is a rural locality (a village) in Denisovskoye Rural Settlement, Gorokhovetsky District, Vladimir Oblast, Russia. The population was 39 as of 2010.

== Geography ==
Slobodishchi is located 19 km west of Gorokhovets (the district's administrative centre) by road. Krutovo is the nearest rural locality.
