= Yeskino =

Yeskino Ескино
- Village
- Location within Vladimir Oblast Location within Russia
- Coordinates: 56°04′N 42°28′E
- Country: Russia
- Region: Vladimir Oblast
- District: Gorokhovetsky District
- Time zone: UTC+3:00

Yeskino (Russian: Ескино) is a rural locality (a village) in Denisovskoye Rural Settlement, Gorokhovetsky District, Vladimir Oblast, Russia. The population was 9 as of 2010.

== Geography ==
Yeskino is located 23 km southwest of Gorokhovets (the district's administrative centre) by road. Aksakovo is the nearest rural locality.
