= Bolshiye Luzhki =

Bolshiye Luzhki Большие Лужки
- Village
- Location within Vladimir Oblast Location within Russia
- Coordinates: 56°10′N 42°35′E
- Country: Russia
- Region: Vladimir Oblast
- District: Gorokhovetsky District
- Time zone: UTC+3:00

Bolshiye Luzhki (Russian: Большие Лужки) is a rural locality (a village) in Kupriyanovskoye Rural Settlement, Gorokhovetsky District, Vladimir Oblast, Russia. The population was 29 as of 2010.

== Geography ==
Bolshiye Luzhki is located on the Klyazma River, 16 km southwest of Gorokhovets (the district's administrative centre) by road. Malye Luzhki is the nearest rural locality.
