= Gorlovka (disambiguation) =

Gorlovka (Russian: Горловка) is the Russian name for Horlivka, a city in the Donetsk Oblast of eastern Ukraine.

It is also the name of several rural localities in Russia:

- Gorlovka, Kaliningrad Oblast, a settlement in Khrabrovsky Rural Okrug of Guryevsky District in Kaliningrad Oblast
- Gorlovka, Moscow Oblast, a village under the administrative jurisdiction of Bolshiye Vyazyomy Work Settlement in Odintsovsky District of Moscow Oblast
- Gorlovka, Vladimir Oblast, a village in Gorokhovetsky District of Vladimir Oblast
