= Myasnikovo =

Myasnikovo Мясниково
- Village
- Location within Vladimir Oblast Location within Russia
- Coordinates: 56°01′N 42°14′E
- Country: Russia
- Region: Vladimir Oblast
- District: Gorokhovetsky District
- Time zone: UTC+3:00

Myasnikovo (Russian: Мясниково) is a rural locality (a village) in Fominskoye Rural Settlement, Gorokhovetsky District, Vladimir Oblast, Russia. The population was 24 as of 2010.

== Geography ==
Myasnikovo is located 45 km southwest of Gorokhovets (the district's administrative centre) by road. Zolotovo is the nearest rural locality.
