= Turakovo =

Turakovo Тураково
- Village
- Location within Vladimir Oblast Location within Russia
- Coordinates: 56°04′N 42°19′E
- Country: Russia
- Region: Vladimir Oblast
- District: Gorokhovetsky District
- Time zone: UTC+3:00

Turakovo (Russian: Тураково) is a rural locality (a village) in Denisovskoye Rural Settlement, Gorokhovetsky District, Vladimir Oblast, Russia. The population was 26 as of 2010.

== Geography ==
Turakovo is located 32 km southwest of Gorokhovets (the district's administrative centre) by road. Denisovo is the nearest rural locality.
