= Botulino =

Botulino Ботулино
- Village
- Location within Vladimir Oblast Location within Russia
- Coordinates: 56°11′N 42°25′E
- Country: Russia
- Region: Vladimir Oblast
- District: Gorokhovetsky District
- Time zone: UTC+3:00

Botulino (Russian: Ботулино) is a rural locality (a village) in Denisovskoye Rural Settlement, Gorokhovetsky District, Vladimir Oblast, Russia. The population was 7 as of 2010.

== Geography ==
Botulino is located near the Klyazma River, 30 km west of Gorokhovets (the district's administrative centre) by road. Tarkhanovo is the nearest rural locality.
