= Rebrovo, Vladimir Oblast =

Rebrovo Реброво
- Village
- Location within Vladimir Oblast Location within Russia
- Coordinates: 55°55′N 42°20′E
- Country: Russia
- Region: Vladimir Oblast
- District: Gorokhovetsky District
- Time zone: UTC+3:00

Rebrovo (Russian: Реброво) is a rural locality (a village) in Fominskoye Rural Settlement, Gorokhovetsky District, Vladimir Oblast, Russia. The population was 43 as of 2010.

== Geography ==
Rebrovo is located 43 km southwest of Gorokhovets (the district's administrative centre) by road. Rassvet is the nearest rural locality.
