= Gashkino =

Gashkino Гашкино
- Village
- Location within Vladimir Oblast Location within Russia
- Coordinates: 56°07′N 42°33′E
- Country: Russia
- Region: Vladimir Oblast
- District: Gorokhovetsky District
- Time zone: UTC+3:00

Gashkino (Russian: Гашкино) is a rural locality (a village) in Denisovskoye Rural Settlement, Gorokhovetsky District, Vladimir Oblast, Russia. The population was 7 as of 2010.

== Geography ==
Gashkino is located on the bank of the Gashkinsky pond, 20 km southwest of Gorokhovets (the district's administrative centre) by road. Murakovo is the nearest rural locality.
