= Zelyony Dol =

Zelyony Dol Зелёный Дол
- Village
- Location within Vladimir Oblast Location within Russia
- Coordinates: 56°09′N 42°45′E
- Country: Russia
- Region: Vladimir Oblast
- District: Gorokhovetsky District
- Time zone: UTC+3:00

Zelyony Dol (Russian: Зелёный Дол) is a rural locality (a village) in Kupriyanovskoye Rural Settlement, Gorokhovetsky District, Vladimir Oblast, Russia. The population was 3 as of 2010.

== Geography ==
Zelyony Dol is located 12 km southeast of Gorokhovets (the district's administrative centre) by road. Timiryazevo is the nearest rural locality.
