= Prosye =

Prosye Просье
- Village
- Location within Vladimir Oblast Location within Russia
- Coordinates: 56°00′N 42°23′E
- Country: Russia
- Region: Vladimir Oblast
- District: Gorokhovetsky District
- Time zone: UTC+3:00

Prosye (Russian: Просье) is a rural locality (a village) in Fominskoye Rural Settlement, Gorokhovetsky District, Vladimir Oblast, Russia. The population was 13 as of 2010. There are 2 streets.

== Geography ==
Prosye is located 34 km southwest of Gorokhovets (the district's administrative centre) by road. Zykovo is the nearest rural locality.
