= Osinki, Gorokhovetsky District, Vladimir Oblast =

Osinki Осинки
- Village
- Location within Vladimir Oblast Location within Russia
- Coordinates: 55°54′N 42°25′E
- Country: Russia
- Region: Vladimir Oblast
- District: Gorokhovetsky District
- Time zone: UTC+3:00

Osinki (Russian: Осинки) is a rural locality (a village) in Fominskoye Rural Settlement, Gorokhovetsky District, Vladimir Oblast, Russia. The population was 5 as of 2010.

== Geography ==
Osinki is located on the Visha River, 46 km southwest of Gorokhovets (the district's administrative centre) by road. Istomino is the nearest rural locality.
