= Sluchkovo =

Sluchkovo Случково
- Village
- Location within Vladimir Oblast Location within Russia
- Coordinates: 56°07′N 42°40′E
- Country: Russia
- Region: Vladimir Oblast
- District: Gorokhovetsky District
- Time zone: UTC+3:00

Sluchkovo (Russian: Случково) is a rural locality (a village) in Kupriyanovskoye Rural Settlement, Gorokhovetsky District, Vladimir Oblast, Russia. The population was 1 as of 2010.

== Geography ==
Sluchkovo is located 14 km south of Gorokhovets (the district's administrative centre) by road. Malinovo is the nearest rural locality.
