= Bolshaya Karpovka =

Bolshaya Karpovka Большая Карповка
- Village
- Location within Vladimir Oblast Location within Russia
- Coordinates: 56°06′N 42°31′E
- Country: Russia
- Region: Vladimir Oblast
- District: Gorokhovetsky District
- Time zone: UTC+3:00

Bolshaya Karpovka (Russian: Большая Карповка) is a rural locality (a village) in Denisovskoye Rural Settlement, Gorokhovetsky District, Vladimir Oblast, Russia. The population was 27 as of 2010.

== Geography ==
Bolshaya Karpovka is located 22 km southwest of Gorokhovets (the district's administrative centre) by road. Chulkovo is the nearest rural locality.
