= Lipovka, Vladimir Oblast =

Lipovka Липовка
- Village
- Location within Vladimir Oblast Location within Russia
- Coordinates: 55°57′N 42°38′E
- Country: Russia
- Region: Vladimir Oblast
- District: Gorokhovetsky District
- Time zone: UTC+3:00

Lipovka (Russian: Липовка) is a rural locality (a village) in Fominskoye Rural Settlement, Gorokhovetsky District, Vladimir Oblast, Russia. The population was 2 as of 2010.

== Geography ==
Lipovka is located on the Oka River, 94 km south of Gorokhovets (the district's administrative centre) by road. Bykasovo is the nearest rural locality.
