= Morozovka, Vladimir Oblast =

Morozovka Морозовка
- Village
- Location within Vladimir Oblast Location within Russia
- Coordinates: 56°10′N 42°42′E
- Country: Russia
- Region: Vladimir Oblast
- District: Gorokhovetsky District
- Time zone: UTC+3:00

Morozovka (Russian: Морозовка) is a rural locality (a village) in Kupriyanovskoye Rural Settlement, Gorokhovetsky District, Vladimir Oblast, Russia. The population was 118 as of 2010.

== Geography ==
Morozovka is located 4 km south of Gorokhovets (the district's administrative centre) by road. Vyezd is the nearest rural locality.
