= Pogost, Gorokhovetsky District, Vladimir Oblast =

Pogost Погост
- Village
- Location within Vladimir Oblast Location within Russia
- Coordinates: 56°06′N 42°38′E
- Country: Russia
- Region: Vladimir Oblast
- District: Gorokhovetsky District
- Time zone: UTC+3:00

Pogost (Russian: Погост) is a rural locality (a village) in Kupriyanovskoye Rural Settlement, Gorokhovetsky District, Vladimir Oblast, Russia. As of 2010, the population was 5.

== Geography ==
The village is located 10 km south-west from Vyezd, 14 km south-west from Gorokhovets.
