= Kraskovo, Vladimir Oblast =

Kraskovo Красково
- Village
- Location within Vladimir Oblast Location within Russia
- Coordinates: 56°06′N 42°28′E
- Country: Russia
- Region: Vladimir Oblast
- District: Gorokhovetsky District
- Time zone: UTC+3:00

Kraskovo (Russian: Красково) is a rural locality (a village) in Denisovskoye Rural Settlement, Gorokhovetsky District, Vladimir Oblast, Russia. The population was 3 as of 2010.

== Geography ==
Kraskovo is located 21 km southwest of Gorokhovets (the district's administrative centre) by road. Krasnaya Yablon is the nearest rural locality.
