= Gruzdevsky =

Gruzdevsky Груздевский
- Settlement
- Location within Vladimir Oblast Location within Russia
- Coordinates: 56°07′N 42°49′E
- Country: Russia
- Region: Vladimir Oblast
- District: Gorokhovetsky District
- Time zone: UTC+3:00

Gruzdevsky (Russian: Груздевский) is a rural locality (a settlement) in Kupriyanovskoye Rural Settlement, Gorokhovetsky District, Vladimir Oblast, Russia. The population was 18 as of 2010. There are 8 streets.

== Geography ==
Gruzdevsky is located on the Suvoroshch River, 19 km southeast of Gorokhovets (the district's administrative centre) by road. Lykshino is the nearest rural locality.
