= Yuryatino =

Yuryatino Юрятино
- Village
- Location within Vladimir Oblast Location within Russia
- Coordinates: 56°06′N 42°42′E
- Country: Russia
- Region: Vladimir Oblast
- District: Gorokhovetsky District
- Time zone: UTC+3:00

Yuryatino (Russian: Юрятино) is a rural locality (a village) in Kupriyanovskoye Rural Settlement, Gorokhovetsky District, Vladimir Oblast, Russia. The population was 5 as of 2010.

== Geography ==
Yuryatino is located on the Suvoroshch River, 16 km south of Gorokhovets (the district's administrative centre) by road. Sapunovo is the nearest rural locality.
