= Vetelnitsy =

Vetelnitsy Ветельницы
- Village
- Location within Vladimir Oblast Location within Russia
- Coordinates: 56°08′N 42°40′E
- Country: Russia
- Region: Vladimir Oblast
- District: Gorokhovetsky District
- Time zone: UTC+3:00

Vetelnitsy (Russian: Ветельницы) is a rural locality (a village) in Kupriyanovskoye Rural Settlement, Gorokhovetsky District, Vladimir Oblast, Russia. The population was 48 as of 2010.

== Geography ==
Vetelnitsy is located 3 km south-west from Vyezd, 8 km south of Gorokhovets (the district's administrative centre) by road. Kupriyanovo is the nearest rural locality.
