= Fominki =

Fominki Фоминки
- Selo
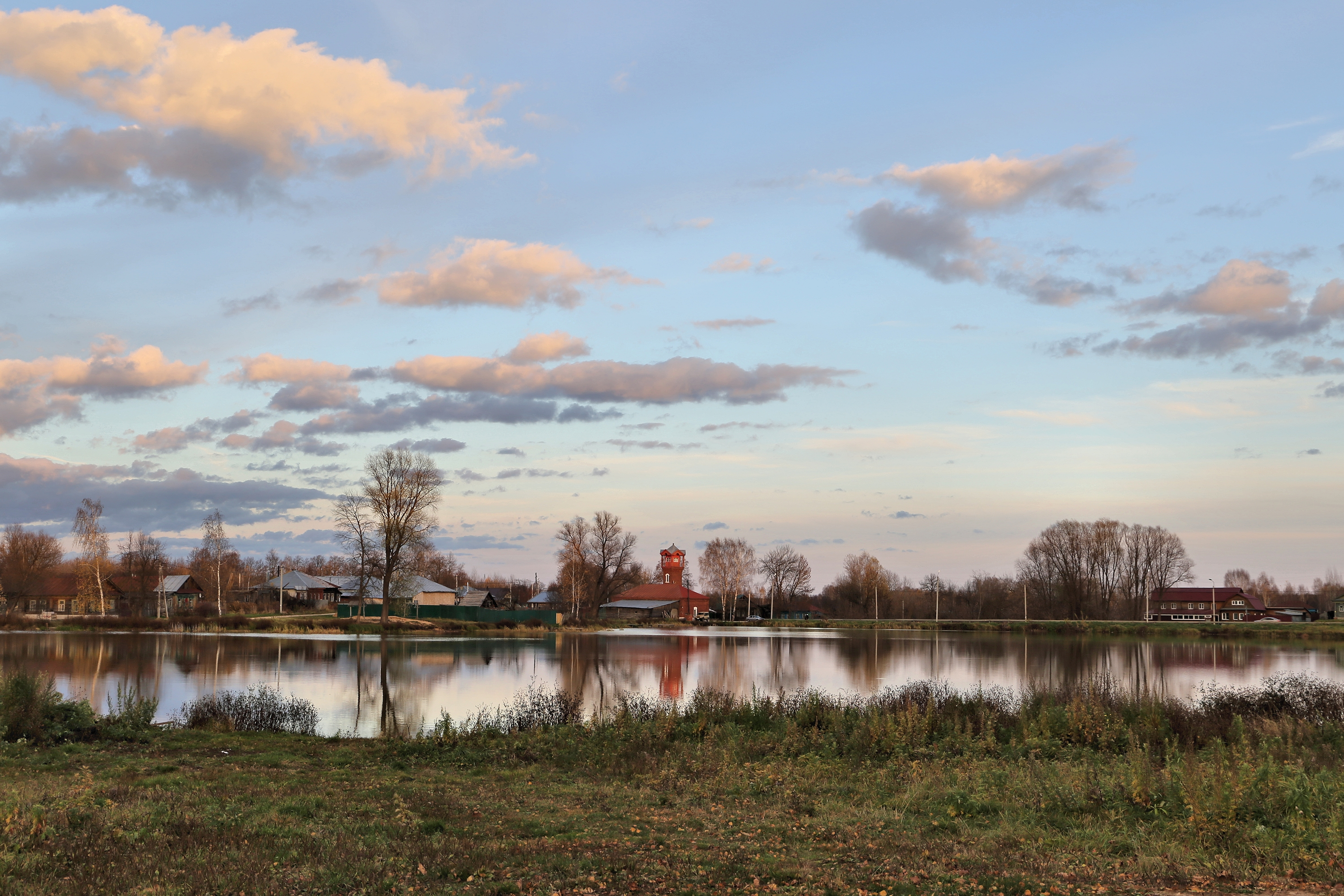
- Central Lake: in the center of the village, Fominki, Gorokhovetsky District, Vladimir Region

- Location within Vladimir Oblast Location within Russia
- Coordinates: 55°57′N 42°22′E
- Country: Russia
- Region: Vladimir Oblast
- District: Gorokhovetsky District
- Time zone: UTC+3:00

Fominki (Russian: Фоминки) is a rural locality (a selo) and the administrative center of Fominskoye Rural Settlement, Gorokhovetsky District, Vladimir Oblast, Russia. The population was 1,305 as of 2010. There are 17 streets.

== Geography ==
Fominki is located 38 km southwest of Gorokhovets (the district's administrative centre) by road. Rassvet is the nearest rural locality.
