= Shuklino =

Shuklino Шуклино
- Village
- Location within Vladimir Oblast Location within Russia
- Coordinates: 56°10′N 42°33′E
- Country: Russia
- Region: Vladimir Oblast
- District: Gorokhovetsky District
- Time zone: UTC+3:00

Shuklino (Russian: Шуклино) is a rural locality (a village) in Kupriyanovskoye Rural Settlement, Gorokhovetsky District, Vladimir Oblast, Russia. The population was 6 as of 2010.

== Geography ==
Shuklino is located on the Klyazma River, 14 km west of Gorokhovets (the district's administrative centre) by road. Khabalevo is the nearest rural locality.
