= Nikitkino =

Nikitkino Никиткино
- Village
- Location within Vladimir Oblast Location within Russia
- Coordinates: 56°07′N 42°21′E
- Country: Russia
- Region: Vladimir Oblast
- District: Gorokhovetsky District
- Time zone: UTC+3:00

Nikitkino (Russian: Никиткино) is a rural locality (a village) in Denisovskoye Rural Settlement, Gorokhovetsky District, Vladimir Oblast, Russia. The population was 6 as of 2010.

== Geography ==
Nikitkino is located 27 km southwest of Gorokhovets (the district's administrative centre) by road. Safoneyevo is the nearest rural locality.
