= Malaya Karpovka =

Malaya Karpovka Малая Карповка
- Village
- Location within Vladimir Oblast Location within Russia
- Coordinates: 56°08′N 42°32′E
- Country: Russia
- Region: Vladimir Oblast
- District: Gorokhovetsky District
- Time zone: UTC+3:00

Malaya Karpovka (Russian: Малая Карповка) is a rural locality (a village) in Denisovskoye Rural Settlement, Gorokhovetsky District, Vladimir Oblast, Russia. The population was 1 as of 2010.

== Geography ==
Malaya Karpovka is located 19 km (12 mi) southwest of Gorokhovets (the district's administrative centre) by road. Murakovo is the nearest rural locality.
