= Balandino, Vladimir Oblast =

Balandino Баландино
- Village
- Location within Vladimir Oblast Location within Russia
- Coordinates: 55°53′N 42°22′E
- Country: Russia
- Region: Vladimir Oblast
- District: Gorokhovetsky District
- Time zone: UTC+3:00

Balandino (Russian: Баландино) is a rural locality (a village) in Fominskoye Rural Settlement, Gorokhovetsky District, Vladimir Oblast, Russia. The population was 16 as of 2010.

== Geography ==
Balandino is located 48 km (30 mi) southwest of Gorokhovets (the district's administrative centre) by road. Zimenki is the nearest rural locality.
