= Proletarsky, Vladimir Oblast =

Proletarsky Пролетарский
- Settlement
- Location within Vladimir Oblast Location within Russia
- Coordinates: 56°06′N 42°19′E
- Country: Russia
- Region: Vladimir Oblast
- District: Gorokhovetsky District
- Time zone: UTC+3:00

Proletarsky (Russian: Пролетарский) is a rural locality (a settlement) and the administrative center of Denisovskoye Rural Settlement, Gorokhovetsky District, Vladimir Oblast, Russia. The population was 1,261 as of 2010. There are 22 streets.

== Geography ==
Proletarsky is located 30 km southwest of Gorokhovets (the district's administrative centre) by road. Denisovo is the nearest rural locality.
