= Ovinishchi, Vladimir Oblast =

Ovinishchi Овинищи
- Village
- Location within Vladimir Oblast Location within Russia
- Coordinates: 56°09′N 42°56′E
- Country: Russia
- Region: Vladimir Oblast
- District: Gorokhovetsky District
- Time zone: UTC+3:00

Ovinishchi (Russian: Овинищи) is a rural locality (a village) in Kupriyanovskoye Rural Settlement, Gorokhovetsky District, Vladimir Oblast, Russia. The population was 22 as of 2010.

== Geography ==
Ovinishchi is located near the Oka River, 18 km southeast of Gorokhovets (the district's administrative centre) by road. Kopsovo is the nearest rural locality.
