= Chulkovo (settlement), Vladimir Oblast =

Chulkovo Чулково
- Settlement
- Location within Vladimir Oblast Location within Russia
- Coordinates: 56°06′N 42°31′E
- Country: Russia
- Region: Vladimir Oblast
- District: Gorokhovetsky District
- Time zone: UTC+3:00

Chulkovo (Russian: Чулково) is a rural locality (a settlement) in Denisovskoye Rural Settlement, Gorokhovetsky District, Vladimir Oblast, Russia. The population was 745 as of 2010. There are 18 streets.

== Geography ==
Chulkovo is located 20 km southwest of Gorokhovets (the district's administrative centre) by road. Bolshaya Karpovka is the nearest rural locality.
