= Chulkovo (village), Vladimir Oblast =

Chulkovo Чулково
- Village
- Location within Vladimir Oblast Location within Russia
- Coordinates: 56°07′N 42°30′E
- Country: Russia
- Region: Vladimir Oblast
- District: Gorokhovetsky District
- Time zone: UTC+3:00

Chulkovo (Russian: Чулково) is a rural locality (a village) in Denisovskoye Rural Settlement, Gorokhovetsky District, Vladimir Oblast, Russia. The population was 4 as of 2010.

== Geography ==
Chulkovo is located 18 km southwest of Gorokhovets (the district's administrative centre) by road. Chulkovo (settlement) is the nearest rural locality.
