= Zaozerye, Vladimir Oblast =

Zaozerye Заозерье
- Village
- Location within Vladimir Oblast Location within Russia
- Coordinates: 55°58′N 42°18′E
- Country: Russia
- Region: Vladimir Oblast
- District: Gorokhovetsky District
- Time zone: UTC+3:00

Zaozerye (Russian: Заозерье) is a rural locality (a village) in Fominskoye Rural Settlement, Gorokhovetsky District, Vladimir Oblast, Russia. The population was 9 as of 2010. There are 2 streets.

== Geography ==
Zaozerye is located on the Krivtsovo Lake, 43 km southwest of Gorokhovets (the district's administrative centre) by road. Fominki is the nearest rural locality.
