= Myachkovo Airport =

Airport in Moscow Oblast, Russia

Myachkovo Мячково
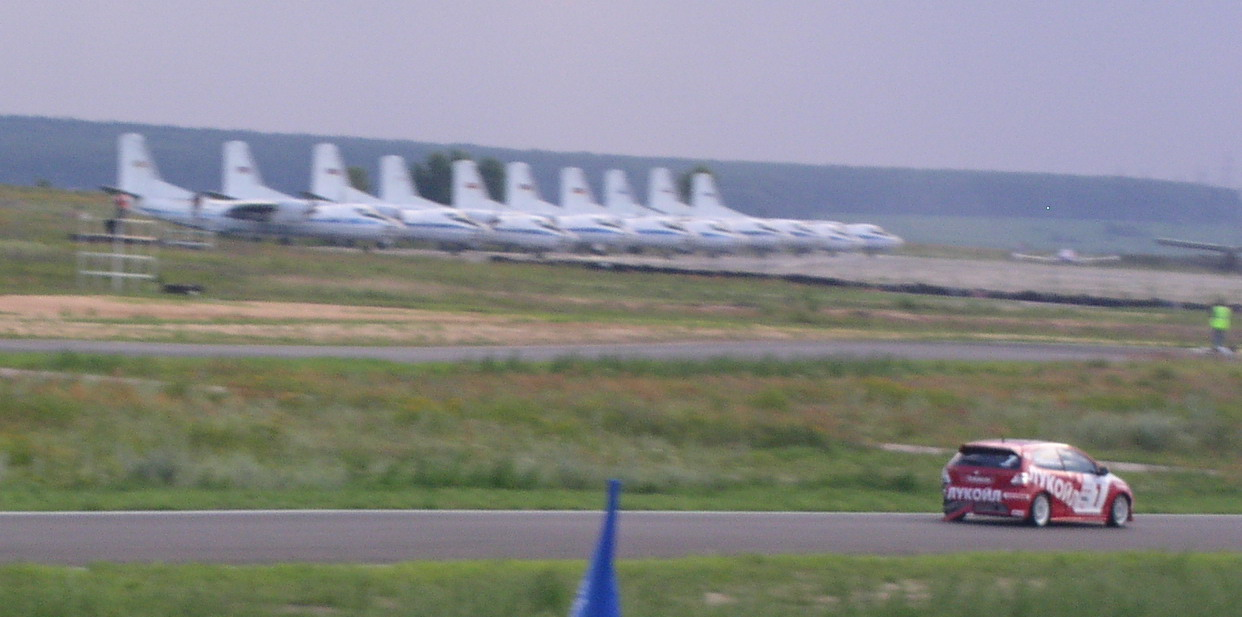
- IATA: none; ICAO: UUBM

Summary
- Airport type: public
- Operator: JSC "Myachkovo Aviation Services"
- Serves: Moscow
- Elevation AMSL: 410 ft / 125 m
- Coordinates: 55°33′36″N 37°59′6″E
- Interactive map of Myachkovo

Runways
Direction	Length		Surface
Direction	ft	m	Surface
06/24	4,593	1,400	Asphalt

Myachkovo (Russian: Мячково) (ICAO: UUBM) is an airport in Moscow Oblast, Russia, located 31 km (19 mi) southeast of Moscow. The runway length including overrun is 1650 m. The facility services transport aircraft up to the size of Ilyushin Il-76 cargo jets. It is owned by Finpromko company.

It is the largest of 19 airports for small planes, helicopters and private flights in Moscow Oblast.

== Accidents and incidents ==
- On 26 June 2004, Lisunov Li-2T RA-1300K of FLA RF crashed at Zaozerye shortly after take-off and was destroyed. The aircraft was operating a domestic non-scheduled passenger flight to Grabtsevo Airport, Kaluga. Two of the five people on board were killed.

== See also ==
- Autodrom Moscow
