= Mikhaylovskaya, Vinogradovsky District, Arkhangelsk Oblast =

Mikhaylovskaya Михайловская
- Village
- Location within Arkhangelsk Oblast Location within Russia
- Coordinates: 62°29′N 43°54′E
- Country: Russia
- Region: Arkhangelsk Oblast
- District: Vinogradovsky District
- Time zone: UTC+3:00

Mikhaylovskaya (Russian: Михайловская) is a rural locality (a village) in Vinogradovsky District, Arkhangelsk Oblast, Russia. The population was 25 as of 2010.

== Geography ==
Mikhaylovskaya is located on the Tyoda River, 80 km southeast of Bereznik (the district's administrative centre) by road. Zauytovskaya is the nearest rural locality.
