= Mikhaylovsky, Paninsky District, Voronezh Oblast =

Mikhaylovsky Михайловский
- Settlement
- Location within Voronezh Oblast Location within Russia
- Coordinates: 51°36′N 40°16′E
- Country: Russia
- Region: Voronezh Oblast
- District: Paninsky District
- Time zone: UTC+3:00

Mikhaylovsky (Russian: Михайловский) is a rural locality (a settlement) and the administrative center of Mikhaylovskoye Rural Settlement, Paninsky District, Voronezh Oblast, Russia. The population was 675 as of 2010. There are 11 streets.

== Geography ==
Mikhaylovsky is located 12 km southeast of Panino (the district's administrative centre) by road. Michurinsky is the nearest rural locality.
