= Mikhaylovsky, Novokhopyorsky District, Voronezh Oblast =

Mikhaylovsky Михайловский
- Settlement
- Location within Voronezh Oblast Location within Russia
- Coordinates: 50°54′N 41°16′E
- Country: Russia
- Region: Voronezh Oblast
- District: Novokhopyorsky District
- Time zone: UTC+3:00

Mikhaylovsky (Russian: Миха́йловский) is a rural locality (a settlement) and the administrative center of Mikhaylovskoye Rural Settlement, Novokhopyorsky District, Voronezh Oblast, Russia. The population was 435 as of 2010. There are 4 streets.

== Geography ==
Mikhaylovsky is located 37 km southwest of Novokhopyorsk (the district's administrative centre) by road. Tsentral is the nearest rural locality.

== Climate ==
The climate is moderately continental. The climate is influenced by the -forming current (Voeykov current) that flows from Transbaikalia, Altai, and Mongolia.
