= Mikhaylovskoye, Ustyuzhensky District, Vologda Oblast =

Mikhaylovskoye Михайловское
- Selo
- Location within Vologda Oblast Location within Russia
- Coordinates: 58°49′N 36°25′E
- Country: Russia
- Region: Vologda Oblast
- District: Ustyuzhensky District
- Time zone: UTC+3:00

Mikhaylovskoye (Russian: Михайловское) is a rural locality (a selo) in Ustyuzhenskoye Rural Settlement, Ustyuzhensky District, Vologda Oblast, Russia. The population was 234 as of 2002.

== Geography ==
Mikhaylovskoye is located 4 km (2.5 mi) southwest of Ustyuzhna (the district's administrative centre) by road. Romankovo is the nearest rural locality.
