= Zaozerye (Khokhlovskoye Rural Settlement), Permsky District, Perm Krai =

Zaozerye Заозерье
- Village
- Location within Perm Krai Location within Russia
- Coordinates: 58°10′N 56°19′E
- Country: Russia
- Region: Perm Krai
- District: Permsky District
- Time zone: UTC+5:00

Zaozerye (Russian: Заозерье) is a rural locality (a village) in Khokhlovskoye Rural Settlement, Permsky District, Perm Krai, Russia. The population was 62 as of 2010. There are 21 streets.

== Geography ==
It is located 7 km south-east from Skobelevka.
