= Mikhaylovskoye, Kharovsky District, Vologda Oblast =

Mikhaylovskoye Михайловское
- Selo
- Location within Vologda Oblast Location within Russia
- Coordinates: 59°58′N 40°29′E
- Country: Russia
- Region: Vologda Oblast
- District: Kharovsky District
- Time zone: UTC+3:00

Mikhaylovskoye (Russian: Михайловское) is a rural locality (a selo) and the administrative center of Mikhaylovskoye Rural Settlement, Kharovsky District, Vologda Oblast, Russia. The population was 274 as of 2002. There are 8 streets.

== Geography ==
Mikhaylovskoye is located 17 km east of Kharovsk (the district's administrative centre) by road. Parshinskaya is the nearest rural locality.
