= Mikhaylovskoye, Sheksninsky District, Vologda Oblast =

Mikhaylovskoye Михайловское
- Village
- Location within Vologda Oblast Location within Russia
- Coordinates: 59°12′N 38°36′E
- Country: Russia
- Region: Vologda Oblast
- District: Sheksninsky District
- Time zone: UTC+3:00

Mikhaylovskoye (Russian: Михайловское) is a rural locality (a village) in Churovskoye Rural Settlement, Sheksninsky District, Vologda Oblast, Russia. The population was 20 as of 2002.

== Geography ==
Mikhaylovskoye is located 8 km east of Sheksna (the district's administrative centre) by road. Mys is the nearest rural locality.
