= Zaozerye (Ust-Kachkinskoye Rural Settlement), Permsky District, Perm Krai =

Zaozerye Заозерье
- Village
- Location within Perm Krai Location within Russia
- Coordinates: 57°57′N 55°36′E
- Country: Russia
- Region: Perm Krai
- District: Permsky District
- Time zone: UTC+5:00

Zaozerye (Russian: Заозерье) is a rural locality (a village) in Ust-Kachkinskoye Rural Settlement, Permsky District, Perm Krai, Russia. The population was 43 as of 2010. There are 6 streets.

== Geography ==
It is located 11 km south-west from Ust-Kachka.
