= Balandino, Perm Krai =

Balandino Баландино
- Village
- Location within Perm Krai Location within Russia
- Coordinates: 57°49′N 56°21′E
- Country: Russia
- Region: Perm Krai
- District: Permsky District
- Time zone: UTC+5:00

Balandino (Russian: Баландино) is a rural locality (a village) in Lobanovskoye Rural Settlement, Permsky District, Perm Krai, Russia. The population was 6 as of 2010. There is 1 street.

== Geography ==
Balandino is located 25 km south of Perm (the district's administrative centre) by road. Maly Burtym is the nearest rural locality.
