= Zaozerye, Vozhegodsky District, Vologda Oblast =

Zaozerye Заозерье
- Village
- Location within Vologda Oblast Location within Russia
- Coordinates: 60°32′N 40°57′E
- Country: Russia
- Region: Vologda Oblast
- District: Vozhegodsky District
- Time zone: UTC+3:00

Zaozerye (Russian: Заозерье) is a rural locality (a village) in Nizhneslobodskoye Rural Settlement, Vozhegodsky District, Vologda Oblast, Russia. The population was 3 as of 2002.

== Geography ==
Zaozerye is located 56 km east of Vozhega (the district's administrative centre) by road. Mitinskaya is the nearest rural locality.
