= Mikhaylovsky, Republic of Bashkortostan =

Mikhaylovsky Михайловский
- Village
- Location within Bashkortostan Location within Russia
- Coordinates: 54°15′N 53°53′E
- Country: Russia
- Region: Bashkortostan
- District: Belebeyevsky District
- Time zone: UTC+5:00

Mikhaylovsky (Russian: Михайловский) is a rural locality (a village) in Yermolkinsky Selsoviet, Belebeyevsky District, Bashkortostan, Russia. The population was 6 as of 2010. There are 4 streets.

== Geography ==
Mikhaylovsky is located 28 km northwest of Belebey (the district's administrative centre) by road. Maloalexandrovka is the nearest rural locality.
