= Zaozerye, Velikoustyugsky District, Vologda Oblast =

Zaozerye Заозерье
- Village
- Location within Vologda Oblast Location within Russia
- Coordinates: 60°44′N 46°16′E
- Country: Russia
- Region: Vologda Oblast
- District: Velikoustyugsky District
- Time zone: UTC+3:00

Zaozerye (Russian: Заозерье) is a rural locality (a village) in Tregubovskoye Rural Settlement, Velikoustyugsky District, Vologda Oblast, Russia. The population was 14 as of 2002.

== Geography ==
Zaozerye is located 11 km southwest of Veliky Ustyug (the district's administrative centre) by road. Belozerovo is the nearest rural locality.
