= Mikhaylovskaya, Verkhovazhsky District, Vologda Oblast =

Mikhaylovskaya Михайловская
- Village
- Location within Vologda Oblast Location within Russia
- Coordinates: 60°47′N 41°41′E
- Country: Russia
- Region: Vologda Oblast
- District: Verkhovazhsky District
- Time zone: UTC+3:00

Mikhaylovskaya (Russian: Михайловская) is a rural locality (a village) in Morozovskoye Rural Settlement, Verkhovazhsky District, Vologda Oblast, Russia. The population was 23 as of 2002. There are 2 streets.

== Geography ==
Mikhaylovskaya is located 25 km northwest of Verkhovazhye (the district's administrative centre) by road. Silinskaya-1 is the nearest rural locality.
