= Mikhaylovskaya, Volgograd Oblast =

Mikhaylovskaya Михайловская
- Stanitsa
- Location within Volgograd Oblast Location within Russia
- Coordinates: 50°57′N 41°53′E
- Country: Russia
- Region: Volgograd Oblast
- District: Uryupinsky District
- Time zone: UTC+4:00

Mikhaylovskaya (Russian: Михайловская) is a rural locality (a stanitsa) and the administrative center of Mikhaylovskoye Rural Settlement, Uryupinsky District, Volgograd Oblast, Russia. The population was 1,118 as of 2010. There are 28 streets.

== Geography ==
Mikhaylovskaya is located in forest steppe, 24 km northwest of Uryupinsk (the district's administrative centre) by road. Sadkovsky is the nearest rural locality.
