= Zaozerye, Kaduysky District, Vologda Oblast =

Zaozerye Заозерье
- Village
- Location within Vologda Oblast Location within Russia
- Coordinates: 59°11′N 37°19′E
- Country: Russia
- Region: Vologda Oblast
- District: Kaduysky District
- Time zone: UTC+3:00

Zaozerye (Russian: Заозерье) is a rural locality (a village) in Semizerye Rural Settlement, Kaduysky District, Vologda Oblast, Russia. The population was 19 as of 2002. There are 14 streets.

== Geography ==
Zaozerye is located 14 km east of Kaduy (the district's administrative centre) by road. Glukhoye is the nearest rural locality.
