= Mikhaylovskaya, Kaduysky District, Vologda Oblast =

Village in Vologda Oblast, Russia with 16 residents

Mikhaylovskaya Михайловская
- Village
- Location within Vologda Oblast Location within Russia
- Coordinates: 59°25′N 37°07′E
- Country: Russia
- Region: Vologda Oblast
- District: Kaduysky District
- Time zone: UTC+3:00

Mikhaylovskaya (Russian: Михайловская) is a rural locality (a village) in Nikolskoye Rural Settlement, Kaduysky District, Vologda Oblast, Russia. The population was 16 as of 2002.

== Geography ==
Mikhaylovskaya is located 33 km north of Kaduy (the district's administrative centre) by road. Tsipelevo is the nearest rural locality.
