= Mikhaylovskaya, Vozhegodsky District, Vologda Oblast =

Mikhaylovskaya Михайловская
- Village
- Location within Vologda Oblast Location within Russia
- Coordinates: 60°35′N 40°17′E
- Country: Russia
- Region: Vologda Oblast
- District: Vozhegodsky District
- Time zone: UTC+3:00

Mikhaylovskaya (Russian: Михайловская) is a rural locality (a village) in Yavengskoye Rural Settlement, Vozhegodsky District, Vologda Oblast, Russia. The population was 125 as of 2002.

== Geography ==
Mikhaylovskaya is located 28 km northeast of Vozhega (the district's administrative centre) by road. Belavinskaya is the nearest rural locality.
