= Zaozerye, Sheksninsky District, Vologda Oblast =

Zaozerye Заозерье
- Village
- Location within Vologda Oblast Location within Russia
- Coordinates: 59°21′N 38°19′E
- Country: Russia
- Region: Vologda Oblast
- District: Sheksninsky District
- Time zone: UTC+3:00

Zaozerye (Russian: Заозерье) is a rural locality (a village) in Yershovskoye Rural Settlement, Sheksninsky District, Vologda Oblast, Russia. The population was 19 as of 2002.

== Geography ==
Zaozerye is located 30 km north of Sheksna (the district's administrative centre) by road. Pustoshka is the nearest rural locality.
