= Gorokhovets, Vladimir Oblast =

Town in Vladimir Oblast, Russia

Gorokhovets Гороховец
- Town
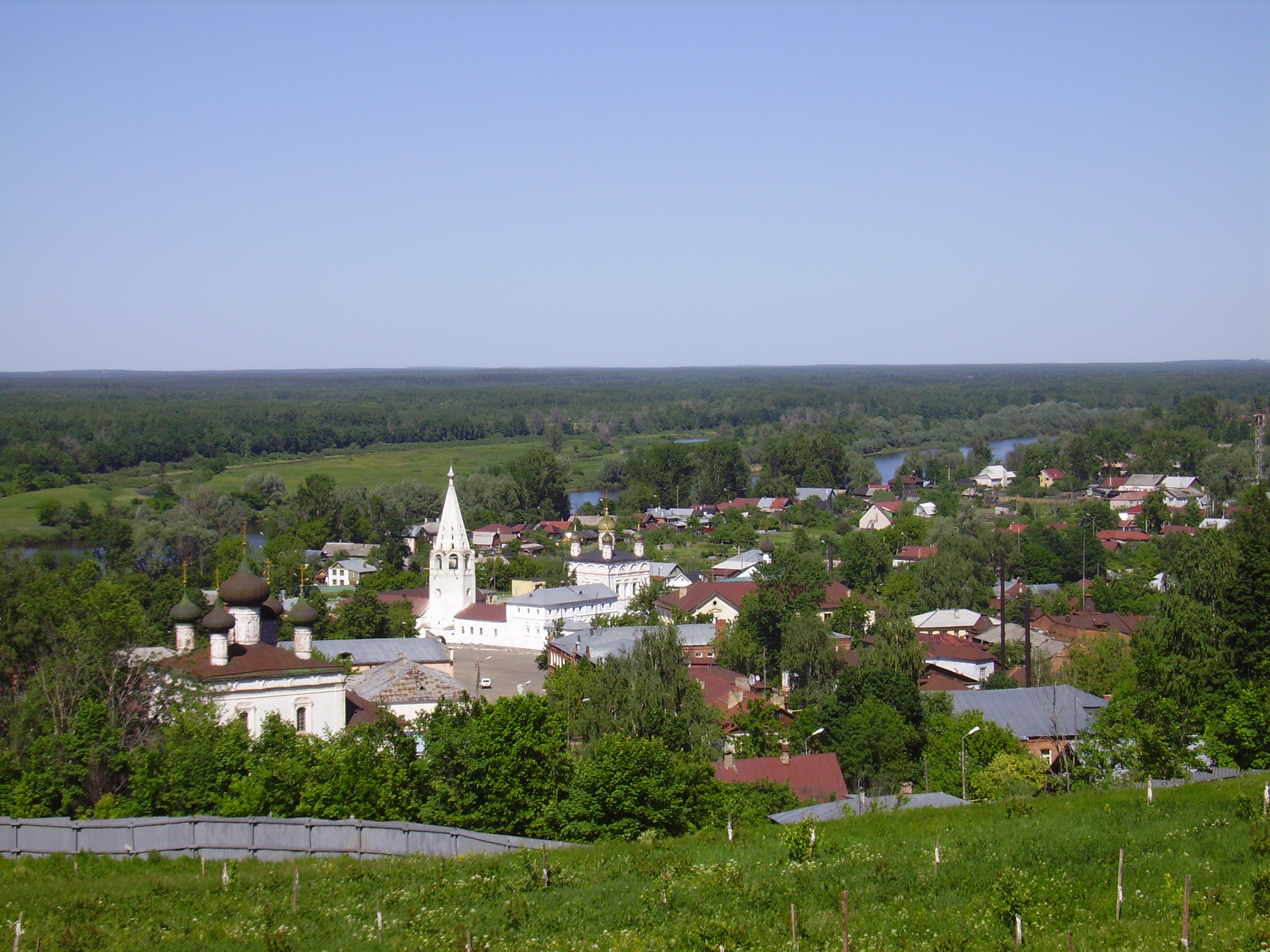
- View of Gorokhovets

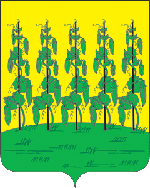
- Flag Coat of arms
- Interactive map of Gorokhovets
- Location of Gorokhovets Gorokhovets (Vladimir Oblast)
- Coordinates: 56°12′N 42°42′E
- Country: Russia
- Federal subject: Vladimir Oblast
- Administrative district: Gorokhovetsky District
- First mentioned: 1239
- Elevation: 100 m (330 ft)

Population (2010 Census)
  - Total: 14,016
  - Estimate (2021): 12,666 (−9.6%)

Administrative status
  - Capital of: Gorokhovetsky District

Municipal status
  - Municipal district: Gorokhovetsky Municipal District
  - Urban settlement: Gorokhovets Urban Settlement
  - Capital of: Gorokhovetsky Municipal District, Gorokhovets Urban Settlement
- Time zone: UTC+3 (MSK)
- Postal code: 601483
- OKTMO ID: 17615101001
- Website: gorohovec.ru

Gorokhovets (Russian: Горохове́ц) is a town and the administrative center of Gorokhovetsky District in Vladimir Oblast, Russia, located on the highway from Moscow to Nizhny Novgorod. It also serves as a river port on the Klyazma River. Population: 12,666 (2021 census); 14,016 (2010 census); 14,524 (2002 census); 15,783 (1989 Soviet census).

== Etymology ==
The name of the town originates from the Russian word "горох" (gorokh, "peas").

== History ==
Gorokhovets was first mentioned in a 1239 chronicle, when it was sacked by the Mongols. It is believed that a minor fortress had existed there for several preceding decades.

In 1539, the Tatars of Kazan were about to burn it but retreated upon allegedly seeing a ghost in a shape of a gigantic knight with a sword. After that, the mount where the apparition was seen came to be known as Puzhalovo ("frightening one").

The golden age of Gorokhovets is associated with the 17th century, when it was a merchandise center for a large area, which comprised today's Vladimir and Ivanovo Oblasts. A number of churches, monasteries, and chambers were commissioned by the local merchants at that time. The 17th-century belfries of Gorokhovets are particularly noteworthy.

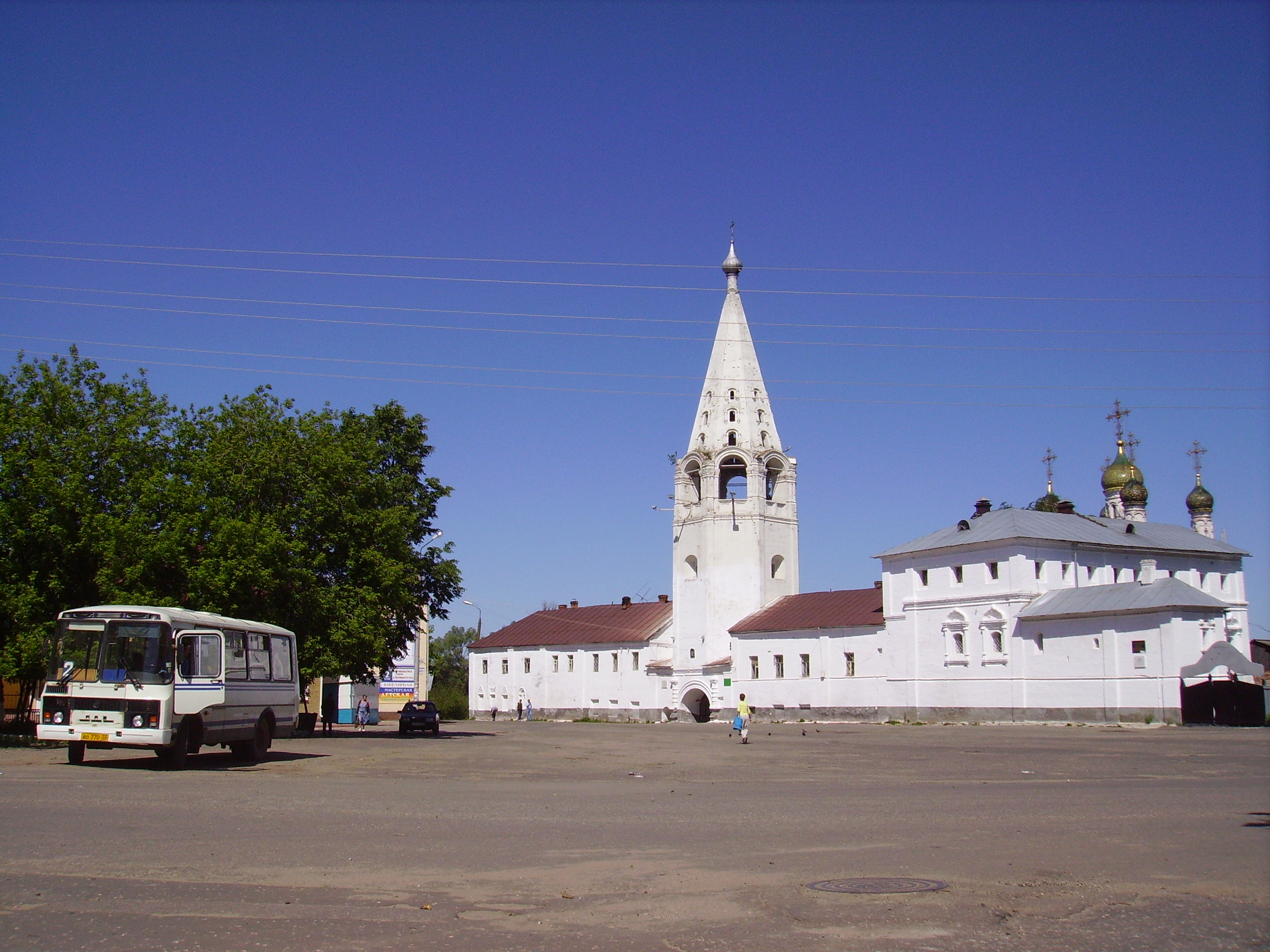
Sretensky Monastery

== Administrative and municipal status ==
Within the framework of administrative divisions, Gorokhovets serves as the administrative center of Gorokhovetsky District, to which it is directly subordinated. As a municipal division, the town of Gorokhovets is incorporated within Gorokhovetsky Municipal District as Gorokhovets Urban Settlement.

== Coat of arms ==
Gorokhovets' coat of arms combines Vladimir's heraldic lion with peas, alluding to the plant which gave rise to the town's name.

== Trivia ==
According to the Soviet TV series Seventeen Moments of Spring, Gorokhovets was a native town of Stierlitz, a fictional Soviet spy in Nazi Germany, played by Vyacheslav Tikhonov.
