= Gorokhovetsky District =

Gorokhovetsky District Гороховецкий район (Russian)
- District
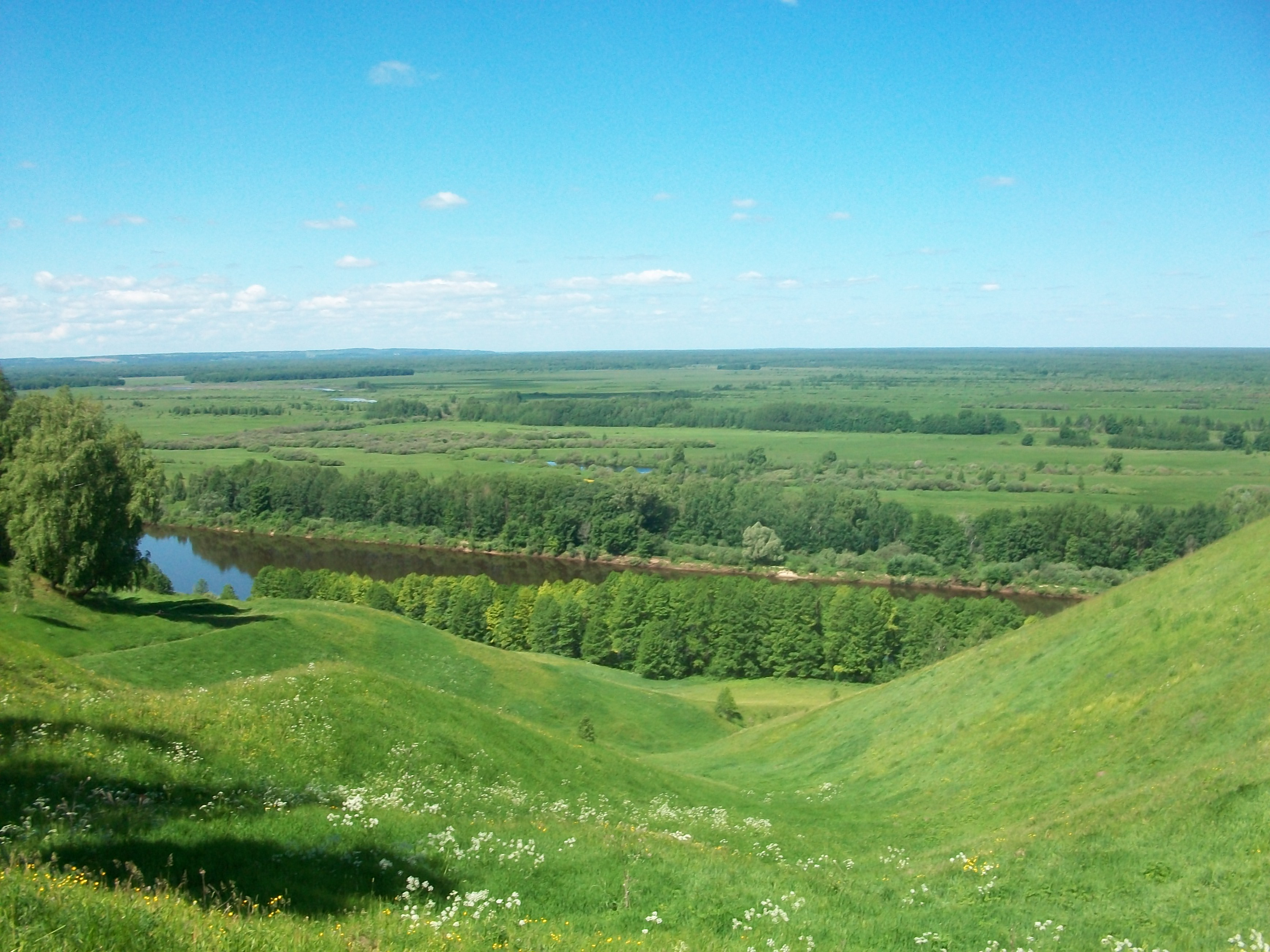
- Klayzma Mound, Gorochovecky District

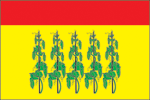
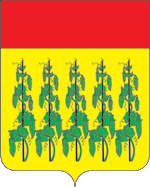
- Flag Coat of arms
- Location of Gorokhovetsky District in Vladimir Oblast
- Coordinates: 56.103°N 42.000°E
- Country: Russia
- Federal subject: Vladimir Oblast
- Established: 10 April 1929
- Administrative center: Gorokhovets

Area
  - Total: 1,487 km^{2} (574 sq mi)

Population (2010 Census)
  - Total: 22,923
  - Density: 15.42/km^{2} (39.93/sq mi)
  - Urban: 61.1%
  - Rural: 38.9%

Administrative structure
  - Inhabited localities: 1 cities/towns, 145 rural localities

Municipal structure
  - Municipally incorporated as: Gorokhovetsky Municipal District
  - Municipal divisions: 1 urban settlements, 3 rural settlements
- Time zone: UTC+3 (MSK)
- OKTMO ID: 17615000
- Website: admgor.avo.ru

Gorokhovetsky District (Russian: Горохове́цкий райо́н) is an administrative and municipal district (raion), one of the sixteen in Vladimir Oblast, Russia. It is located in the east of the oblast. The area of the district is 1,487 square kilometers (574 sq mi). Its administrative center is the town of Gorokhovets. Population: 20,870 (2021 census); 22,923 (2010 census); 25,832 (2002 Census); 30,156 (1989 Soviet census). The population of Gorokhovets accounts for 60.7% of the district's total population.
