= 2023 Yaroslavl Oblast Duma election =

- 8–10 September 2023
- Turnout: 27.35%
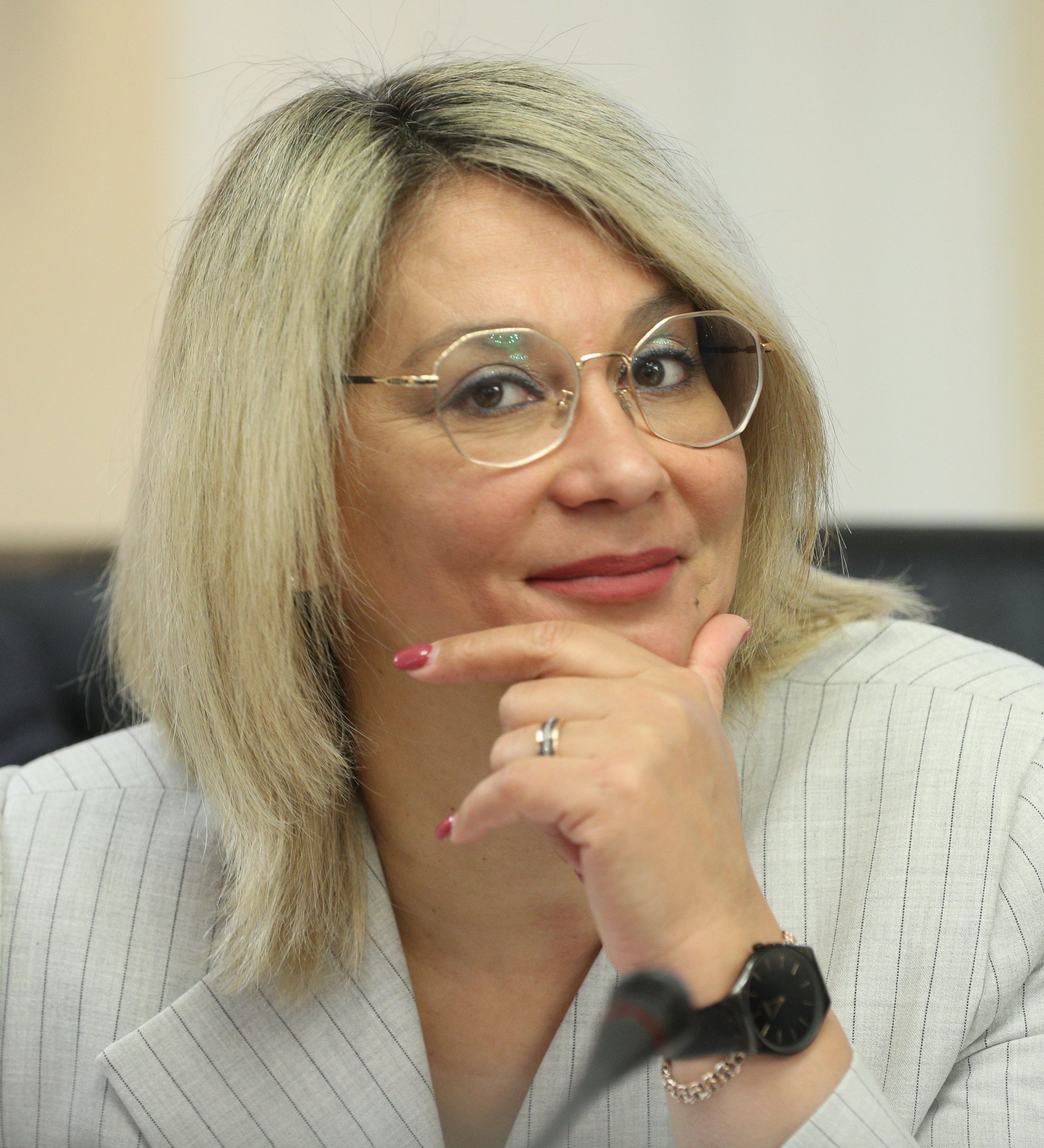

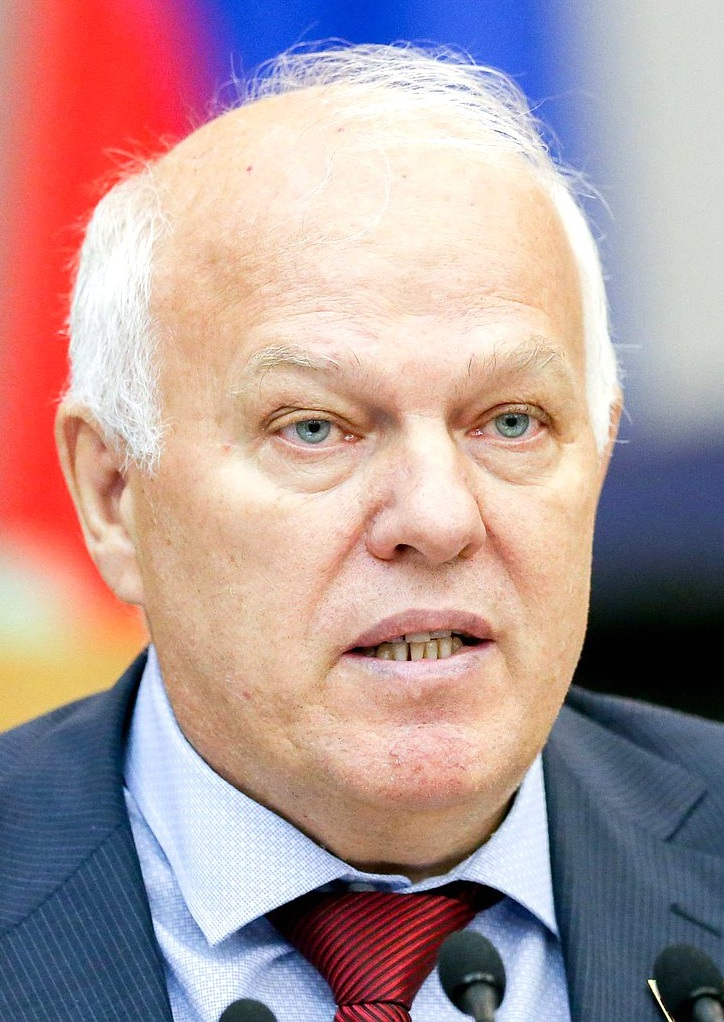

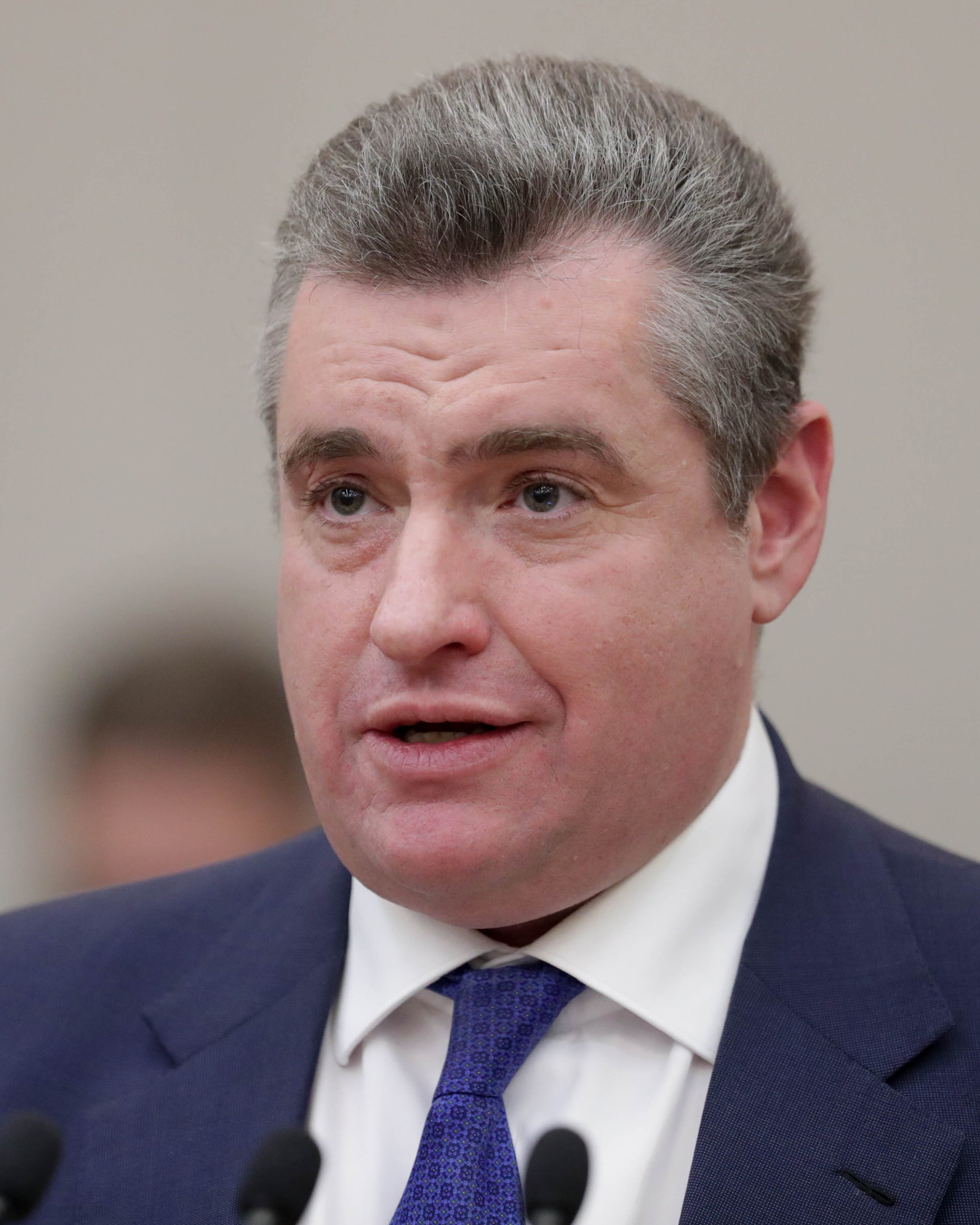
	Majority party	Minority party	Third party
		CPRF
Candidate	Natalia Kosikhina	Mikhail Paramonov	Anatoly Greshnevikov
Leader	Dmitry Medvedev	Gennady Zyuganov	Sergey Mironov
Party	United Russia	CPRF	SR-ZP
Last election	32 seats, 38.43%	11 seats, 24.03%	3 seats, 10.26%
Seats won	38	2	1
Seat change	▲6	▼9	▼2
Popular vote	126,494	30,588	30,367
Percentage	46.60%	11.27%	11.19%
Swing	▲8.17%	▼12.76%	▲0.93%
	Fourth party	Fifth party	Sixth party
		NL	RPPSS
Candidate	Leonid Slutsky	Yaroslav Shilov	Yulia Ovchinnikova
Leader	Leonid Slutsky	Aleksey Nechayev	Vladimir Burakov
Party	LDPR	New People	Party of Pensioners
Last election	3 seats, 12.97%	Did not exist	Did not participate
Seats won	1	2	1
Seat change	▼2	Did not exist	Did not participate
Popular vote	30,247	20,055	15,245
Percentage	11.14%	7.39%	5.62%
Swing	▼1.83%	Did not exist	Did not participate

The 2023 Yaroslavl Oblast Duma election took place on 8–10 September 2023, on common election day. All 46 seats in the Oblast Duma were up for reelection.

== Electoral system ==
Under current election laws, the Oblast Duma is elected for a term of five years, with parallel voting. 12 seats are elected by party-list proportional representation with a 5% electoral threshold, with the other half elected in 34 single-member constituencies by first-past-the-post voting. Until 2023 the number of mandates allocated in proportional and majoritarian parts were standing at 25 each. Seats in the proportional part are allocated using the Imperiali quota, modified to ensure that every party list, which passes the threshold, receives at least one mandate.

== Candidates ==
=== Party lists ===
To register regional lists of candidates, parties need to collect 0.5% of signatures of all registered voters in Yaroslavl Oblast. Party lists do not have an oblast-wide part, the lists are only divided by territorial groups.

The following parties were relieved from the necessity to collect signatures:

- United Russia
- Communist Party of the Russian Federation
- A Just Russia — Patriots — For Truth
- Liberal Democratic Party of Russia
- New People
- Communists of Russia

No.	Party	Territorial groups' leaders	Candidates	Territorial groups	Status
1	Communists of Russia	Artyom Denisov • Andrey Andriychuk • Natalya Yermakova • Ilya Zotov • Sergey Malinkovich • Igor Miloradov • Andrey Bobkov • Aleksey Balabutkin • Tatyana Borisova • Mikhail Matiko • Andrey Rudashevsky • Ilya Kleymenov • Ivan Semenov • Yaroslav Sidorov • Ruslan Khugayev • Ivan Bychkov • Tatyana Kostina	17	17	Registered
2	United Russia	Mikhail Borovitsky • Natalia Kosikhina • Tigran Kazaryan • Yury Filimendikov • Olga Khitrova • Vladimir Bespalko • Marina Stepanova • Aleksandr Goncharov • Nikolay Aleksandrychev • Mikhail Osipov • Viktor Volonchunas	51	11	Registered
3	New People	Yaroslav Shilov • Artyom Akindinov • Yelena Fedorova • Ruslan Filatov • Ivan Lobanov • Yevgeny Zhuravlev • Andrey Sidorov • Vera Rastsvetova • Aleksandr Ignatenko • Olga Lebedeva • Maksim Kopeykin • Gleb Salnikov • Anastasia Sergeyeva • Pavel Kiselev • Ivan Chukayev	31	15	Registered
4	Communist Party	Denis Demin • Valery Baylo • Yelena Kuznetsova • Natalia Bobryakova • Elkhan Mardaliyev • Aleksey Filippov • Alesya Kolobkova • Vasily Blinov • Nelli Nedzvetskaya • Oleg Leontyev • Mikhail Paramonov • Nikolay Gribko • Aleksandr Dyma • Mikhail Bokov • Sergey Lebedev • Yevgeny Dulnev • Yury Komogortsev	42	17	Registered
5	Liberal Democratic Party	Irina Lobanova • Aleksandr Shilov • Viktoria Utkina • Yelena Uspenskaya • Roman Skornyakov • Leonid Slutsky • Vladimir Smirnov • Inna Aleksandrova • Andrey Pantyukhov • Ksenia Nesterova • Mikhail Chichagov • Marina Savelyeva	35	12	Registered
6	A Just Russia – For Truth	Anatoly Lisitsyn • Sergey Pavlovnin • Tatyana Shamina • Anatoly Kashirin • Alyona Vernova • Dmitry Bondarev • Anatoly Greshnevikov • Sergey Khabibulin • Sergey Bogachkov • Andrey Solovyev • Vasily Meshkov • Yelena Smirnova	32	12	Registered
7	Party of Pensioners	Nadezhda Promyslova • Sergey Krayevoy • Kristina Smirnova • Maksim Klimov • Andrey Buryanovaty • Oksana Kotova • Marat Alimov • Marina Kiseleva • Yulia Ovchinnikova • Ivan Khomenko • Anna Beskhmelnitsina • Svetlana Bakunina • Andrey Kiselev • Sergey Paramazyan • Lyudmila Klimova	15	15	Registered
	Rodina	Viktor Sheremetyev • Nikolay Voyedilov • Yekaterina Gvozdeva • Dmitry Yevseyev • Ilya Ivanov • Vladimir Kukharenko • Yury Misolin • Dmitry Pavlov • Aleksandr Vinogradov • Maria Solomatina • Anastasia Gagarkina • Aleksandr Balagansky • Nadezhda Kuznetsova • Grigory Fomin • Marina Svitko	27	15	Failed the certification

New People and Russian Party of Pensioners for Social Justice will take part in Yaroslavl Oblast legislative election for the first time. Patriots of Russia, who participated in the last election, had been dissolved prior.

=== Single-mandate constituencies ===
34 single-mandate constituencies were formed in Yaroslavl Oblast, an increase of 9 seats since last redistricting in 2018. To register candidates in single-mandate constituencies need to collect 3% of signatures of registered voters in the constituency.

Number of candidates in single-mandate constituencies
Party	Candidates	
Party	Nominated	Registered
United Russia	34	34
Communist Party	31	29
Liberal Democratic Party	34	34
A Just Russia — For Truth	28	27
Communists of Russia	34	34
New People	29	28
Party of Pensioners	1	1
Party for Fairness!	1	0
Independent	17	1
Total	209	188

== Results ==
=== Results by party lists ===
Summary of the 8–10 September 2023 Yaroslavl Oblast Duma election results
Party	Party list					Constituency		Total	
Party	Votes	%	±pp	Seats	+/–	Seats	+/–	Seats	+/–
United Russia	126,494	46.60	▲8.17%	6	▼5	32	▲11	38	▲6
Communist Party	30,588	11.27	▼12.76%	2	▼5	0	▼4	2	▼9
A Just Russia — For Truth	30,367	11.19	▲0.93%	1	▼2	0	Steady	1	▼2
Liberal Democratic Party	30,247	11.14	▼1.83%	1	▼2	0	Steady	1	▼2
New People	20,055	7.39	New	1	New	1	New	2	New
Party of Pensioners	15,245	5.62	New	1	New	0	New	1	New
Communists of Russia	12,216	4.50	▼2.13%	0	▼1	0	Steady	0	▼1
Independents	–	–	–	–	–	1	▲1	1	▲1
Invalid ballots	6,236	2.30	▼1.91%	—	—	—	—	—	—
Total	271,450	100.00	—	12	▼13	34	▲9	46	▼4
Turnout	271,450	27.35	▼1.92%	—	—	—	—	—	—
Registered voters	992,369	100.00	—	—	—	—	—	—	—

Mikhail Borovitsky (United Russia) was re-elected as Chairman of the Oblast Duma, while incumbent Senator Natalia Kosikhina (United Russia) was re-appointed to the Federation Council.

=== Results in single-member constituencies ===
==== District 1 ====
Summary of the 8–10 September 2023 Yaroslavl Oblast Duma election in District 1
Candidate	Party	Votes	%
Aleksandr Goncharov (incumbent)	United Russia	3,878	59.70%
Denis Demin	Communist Party	985	15.16%
Yulia Banokina	Liberal Democratic Party	772	11.88%
Anton Smirnov	New People	489	7.53%
Artyom Denisov	Communists of Russia	233	3.59%
Total		6,496	100%

==== District 2 ====
Summary of the 8–10 September 2023 Yaroslavl Oblast Duma election in District 2
Candidate	Party	Votes	%
Vadim Kanashkin	United Russia	3,155	51.14%
Mikhail Maleyev	A Just Russia – For Truth	926	15.01%
Vyacheslav Maykov	Communist Party	721	11.69%
Sergey Pervuninsky	Liberal Democratic Party	609	9.87%
Anastasia Sergeyeva	New People	445	7.21%
Danil Kolchin	Communists of Russia	192	3.11%
Total		6,169	100%

==== District 3 ====
Summary of the 8–10 September 2023 Yaroslavl Oblast Duma election in District 3
Candidate	Party	Votes	%
Nikolay Aleksandrychev (incumbent)	United Russia	3,734	53.87%
Sergey Grachev	Communist Party	894	12.90%
Oksana Mironova	A Just Russia – For Truth	692	9.98%
Andrey Pantyukhov	Liberal Democratic Party	623	8.99%
Aleksandr Ignatenko	New People	516	7.44%
Andrey Andriychuk	Communists of Russia	307	4.43%
Total		6,932	100%

==== District 4 ====
Summary of the 8–10 September 2023 Yaroslavl Oblast Duma election in District 4
Candidate	Party	Votes	%
Aleksandr Kutashov	United Russia	3,280	47.99%
Valery Baylo	Communist Party	1,162	17.00%
Vladimir Molodkin	New People	869	12.71%
Aleksey Nekrasov	A Just Russia – For Truth	672	9.83%
Kirill Krylov	Liberal Democratic Party	503	7.36%
Vadim Kraynov	Communists of Russia	211	3.09%
Total		6,835	100%

==== District 5 ====
Summary of the 8–10 September 2023 Yaroslavl Oblast Duma election in District 5
Candidate	Party	Votes	%
Mikhail Pisarets	United Russia	3,211	49.45%
Yelena Kuznetsova	Communist Party	1,447	22.28%
Anna Sizova	New People	885	13.63%
Natalya Yermakova	Communists of Russia	433	6.67%
Farman Zamanov	Liberal Democratic Party	377	5.81%
Total		6,494	100%

==== District 6 ====
Summary of the 8–10 September 2023 Yaroslavl Oblast Duma election in District 6
Candidate	Party	Votes	%
Teymuraz Baratashvili	United Russia	2,772	41.27%
Natalya Bobryakova	Communist Party	1,747	26.01%
Vladimir Smirnov	Liberal Democratic Party	1,248	18.58%
Aleksandr Kharchenko	A Just Russia – For Truth	389	5.79%
Timur Khudoyarov	New People	279	4.15%
Maksim Protazanov	Communists of Russia	124	1.85%
Total		6,716	100%

==== District 7 ====
Summary of the 8–10 September 2023 Yaroslavl Oblast Duma election in District 7
Candidate	Party	Votes	%
Andrey Vlasov	United Russia	3,847	47.88%
Tatyana Shamina	A Just Russia – For Truth	1,684	20.96%
Elkhan Mardaliyev (incumbent)	Communist Party	1,006	12.52%
Olga Tolgobolskaya	Liberal Democratic Party	601	7.48%
Mikhail Yarakin	New People	374	4.65%
Igor Miloradov	Communists of Russia	357	4.44%
Total		8,035	100%

==== District 8 ====
Summary of the 8–10 September 2023 Yaroslavl Oblast Duma election in District 8
Candidate	Party	Votes	%
Olga Gorshunova	United Russia	3,902	51.84%
Yevgenia Ovod	Communist Party	1,537	20.42%
Boris Voronov	Liberal Democratic Party	736	9.78%
Olga Milto	A Just Russia – For Truth	687	9.13%
Pavel Kiselev	New People	255	3.39%
Elvira Guseva	Communists of Russia	208	2.76%
Total		7,527	100%

==== District 9 ====
Summary of the 8–10 September 2023 Yaroslavl Oblast Duma election in District 9
Candidate	Party	Votes	%
Maksim Vakhrukov (incumbent)	United Russia	3,561	46.49%
Marina Ulyanova	Liberal Democratic Party	1,238	16.16%
Aleksey Filippov	Communist Party	1,150	15.02%
Roman Suknev	A Just Russia – For Truth	1,142	14.91%
Aleksandr Filippov	Communists of Russia	311	4.06%
Total		7,659	100%

==== District 10 ====
Summary of the 8–10 September 2023 Yaroslavl Oblast Duma election in District 10
Candidate	Party	Votes	%
Aleksandr Kiselev	United Russia	4,304	55.90%
Alesya Kolobkova	Communist Party	1,218	15.82%
Vladimir Kuznetsov	A Just Russia – For Truth	656	8.52%
Ksenia Nesterova	Liberal Democratic Party	567	7.36%
Yevgeny Zhuravlev	New People	476	6.18%
Andrey Bobkov	Communists of Russia	313	4.06%
Total		7,700	100%

==== District 11 ====
Summary of the 8–10 September 2023 Yaroslavl Oblast Duma election in District 11
Candidate	Party	Votes	%
Andrey Shchennikov (incumbent)	United Russia	4,245	61.46%
Anatoly Rykov	Communist Party	820	11.87%
Aleksandra Shendrik	Liberal Democratic Party	630	9.12%
Svyatoslav Chernyshov	A Just Russia – For Truth	622	9.01%
Irina Stepanova	Communists of Russia	456	6.60%
Total		6,907	100%

==== District 12 ====
Summary of the 8–10 September 2023 Yaroslavl Oblast Duma election in District 12
Candidate	Party	Votes	%
Vasily Bobkov (incumbent)	United Russia	3,469	50.20%
Yelena Gorbunova	Communist Party	1,011	14.63%
Inna Aleksandrova	Liberal Democratic Party	819	11.85%
Sergey Ananyin	New People	637	9.22%
Sergey Pavlovnin	A Just Russia – For Truth	622	9.00%
Andrey Zhernikov	Communists of Russia	183	2.65%
Total		6,911	100%

==== District 13 ====
Summary of the 8–10 September 2023 Yaroslavl Oblast Duma election in District 13
Candidate	Party	Votes	%
Aleksey Chernobrovkin	United Russia	3,622	54.16%
Aleksey Markov	Communist Party	1,041	15.57%
Yelena Fedorova	New People	554	8.28%
Tatyana Pantyukhova	Liberal Democratic Party	548	8.19%
Yevgeny Zvezdin	A Just Russia – For Truth	511	7.64%
Dmitry Shulga	Communists of Russia	236	3.53%
Total		6,688	100%

==== District 14 ====
Summary of the 8–10 September 2023 Yaroslavl Oblast Duma election in District 14
Candidate	Party	Votes	%
Viktor Volonchunas	United Russia	3,151	51.50%
Anatoly Kashirin	A Just Russia – For Truth	1,089	17.80%
Andrey Naydenkov	Liberal Democratic Party	555	9.07%
Sergey Skvortsov	Communist Party	546	8.92%
Olga Nazarova	New People	442	7.22%
Marina Grabalova	Communists of Russia	239	3.91%
Total		6,119	100%

==== District 15 ====
Summary of the 8–10 September 2023 Yaroslavl Oblast Duma election in District 15
Candidate	Party	Votes	%
Roman Slonin (incumbent)	United Russia	4,072	57.06%
Maksim Batygin	New People	1,003	14.06%
Svetlana Shendrik	Liberal Democratic Party	817	11.45%
Vasily Blinov	Communist Party	730	10.23%
Yekaterina Shustina	Communists of Russia	359	5.03%
Total		7,136	100%

==== District 16 ====
Summary of the 8–10 September 2023 Yaroslavl Oblast Duma election in District 16
Candidate	Party	Votes	%
Sergey Borisov (incumbent)	United Russia	2,921	44.66%
Dmitry Bondarev	A Just Russia – For Truth	1,760	26.91%
Anastasia Zaytseva	Communist Party	797	12.18%
Vera Rastsvetova	New People	347	5.30%
Mikhail Chichagov	Liberal Democratic Party	266	4.07%
Ivan Trofimov	Communists of Russia	204	3.12%
Total		6,541	100%

==== District 17 ====
Summary of the 8–10 September 2023 Yaroslavl Oblast Duma election in District 17
Candidate	Party	Votes	%
Ruslan Polkuyev	United Russia	3,260	46.35%
Andrey Yershov	A Just Russia – For Truth	1,354	19.25%
Vladimir Pudovikov	Communist Party	706	10.04%
Aleksandr Belov	Liberal Democratic Party	569	8.09%
Artyom Akindinov	New People	500	7.11%
Vladimir Yershov	Communists of Russia	421	5.99%
Total		7,033	100%

==== District 18 ====
Summary of the 8–10 September 2023 Yaroslavl Oblast Duma election in District 18
Candidate	Party	Votes	%
Larisa Ushakova (incumbent)	United Russia	3,461	60.21%
Oleg Leontyev	Communist Party	1,206	20.98%
Irina Belova	Liberal Democratic Party	359	6.25%
Ivan Chukayev	New People	319	5.55%
Igor Morozov	Communists of Russia	217	3.78%
Total		5,748	100%

==== District 19 ====
Summary of the 8–10 September 2023 Yaroslavl Oblast Duma election in District 19
Candidate	Party	Votes	%
Valentin Zhuravlyov	United Russia	4,155	55.73%
Vladimir Denisov (incumbent)	A Just Russia – For Truth	1,729	23.19%
Yaroslav Shilov	New People	503	6.75%
Aleksey Sadikov	Communist Party	474	6.36%
Sudzhaddin Dzhafarov	Liberal Democratic Party	273	3.66%
Aleksandr Zelentsov	Communists of Russia	141	1.89%
Total		7,455	100%

==== District 20 ====
Summary of the 8–10 September 2023 Yaroslavl Oblast Duma election in District 20
Candidate	Party	Votes	%
Marina Stepanova	United Russia	3,681	56.04%
Shakir Abdullayev (incumbent)	A Just Russia – For Truth	1,483	22.58%
Aleksey Kerbunov	Communists of Russia	452	6.88%
Olga Lebedeva	New People	429	6.53%
Marina Savelyeva	Liberal Democratic Party	361	5.50%
Total		6,568	100%

==== District 21 ====
Summary of the 8–10 September 2023 Yaroslavl Oblast Duma election in District 21
Candidate	Party	Votes	%
Mikhail Borovitsky	United Russia	6,943	56.85%
Nikolay Gribko	Communist Party	2,432	19.91%
Irina Lobanova	Liberal Democratic Party	914	7.48%
Vasily Meshkov	A Just Russia – For Truth	737	6.04%
Gleb Salnikov	New People	510	4.18%
Nadezhda Kibrik	Communists of Russia	321	2.63%
Total		12,212	100%

==== District 22 ====
Summary of the 8–10 September 2023 Yaroslavl Oblast Duma election in District 22
Candidate	Party	Votes	%
Yana Karushkina	United Russia	4,620	51.59%
Aleksandr Bokarev	A Just Russia – For Truth	1,498	16.73%
Aleksandr Shilov	Liberal Democratic Party	1,018	11.37%
Nelli Nedzvetskaya	Communist Party	907	10.13%
Tatyana Borisova	Communists of Russia	381	4.25%
Dmitry Shcherbakov	New People	304	3.39%
Total		8,955	100%

==== District 23 ====
Summary of the 8–10 September 2023 Yaroslavl Oblast Duma election in District 23
Candidate	Party	Votes	%
Sergey Sokolov	Independent	1,857	23.84%
Sergey Khabibulin	A Just Russia – For Truth	1,732	22.23%
Svetlana Starostina	United Russia	1,048	13.45%
Ilya Pavlin	Liberal Democratic Party	992	12.73%
Konstantin Gridnev (incumbent)	Communist Party	907	11.64%
Ruslan Filatov	New People	626	8.04%
Mikhail Mulenkov	Party of Pensioners	178	2.28%
Valentin Shabanov	Communists of Russia	148	1.90%
Total		7,790	100%

==== District 24 ====
Summary of the 8–10 September 2023 Yaroslavl Oblast Duma election in District 24
Candidate	Party	Votes	%
Aleksey Yudayev	United Russia	4,557	44.00%
Olga Sekacheva	A Just Russia – For Truth	3,805	36.74%
Yevgeny Smirnov	Liberal Democratic Party	850	8.21%
Tatyana Kostina	Communists of Russia	815	7.87%
Total		10,357	100%

==== District 25 ====
Summary of the 8–10 September 2023 Yaroslavl Oblast Duma election in District 25
Candidate	Party	Votes	%
Anton Kapralov (incumbent)	United Russia	4,712	63.52%
Sergey Bogachkov	A Just Russia – For Truth	1,405	18.94%
Igor Polozov	Communist Party	522	7.04%
Natalia Lisenkova	Liberal Democratic Party	249	3.36%
Gleb Badurin	Communists of Russia	203	2.74%
Valery Gushchin	New People	130	1.75%
Total		7,418	100%

==== District 26 ====
Summary of the 8–10 September 2023 Yaroslavl Oblast Duma election in District 26
Candidate	Party	Votes	%
Ilya Osipov (incumbent)	United Russia	5,309	58.88%
Aleksey Ulyanychev	Liberal Democratic Party	1,363	15.12%
Roman Kozlov	Communist Party	651	7.22%
Sergey Shemanayev	A Just Russia – For Truth	530	5.88%
Olga Vaulina	Communists of Russia	421	4.67%
Yekaterina Bogdanova	New People	407	4.51%
Total		9,017	100%

==== District 27 ====
Summary of the 8–10 September 2023 Yaroslavl Oblast Duma election in District 27
Candidate	Party	Votes	%
Aleksey Kalganov (incumbent)	United Russia	4,719	56.08%
Dmitry Gordeyev	New People	1,126	13.38%
Sergey Lebedev	Communist Party	736	8.75%
Andrey Solovyev	A Just Russia – For Truth	680	8.08%
Yekaterina Kashina	Liberal Democratic Party	498	5.92%
Yevgeny Moykin	Communists of Russia	325	3.86%
Total		8,415	100%

==== District 28 ====
Summary of the 8–10 September 2023 Yaroslavl Oblast Duma election in District 28
Candidate	Party	Votes	%
Yury Pavlov	New People	4,724	45.80%
Aleksey Levashov	United Russia	3,371	32.68%
Oleg Bushuyev	Communist Party	761	7.38%
Viktoria Utkina	Liberal Democratic Party	756	7.33%
Marina Rumyantseva	Communists of Russia	337	3.27%
Total		10,314	100%

==== District 29 ====
Summary of the 8–10 September 2023 Yaroslavl Oblast Duma election in District 29
Candidate	Party	Votes	%
Aleksey Makarov (incumbent)	United Russia	5,421	71.34%
Anna Oborina	Communists of Russia	682	8.97%
Kureysh Albakov	A Just Russia – For Truth	514	6.76%
Ilya Lozanenko	Liberal Democratic Party	397	5.22%
Maksim Kopeykin	New People	366	4.82%
Total		7,599	100%

==== District 30 ====
Summary of the 8–10 September 2023 Yaroslavl Oblast Duma election in District 30
Candidate	Party	Votes	%
Ivan Demidov (incumbent)	United Russia	7,558	62.82%
Yekaterina Semyonova	Liberal Democratic Party	2,831	23.53%
Ilya Nesterov	Communists of Russia	1,200	9.97%
Total		12,031	100%

==== District 31 ====
Summary of the 8–10 September 2023 Yaroslavl Oblast Duma election in District 31
Candidate	Party	Votes	%
Natalia Kosikhina	United Russia	7,077	66.01%
Yelena Smirnova	A Just Russia – For Truth	1,084	10.11%
Svetlana Belozerova	Liberal Democratic Party	852	7.95%
Sergey Zubov	Communist Party	847	7.90%
Ilya Zotov	Communists of Russia	570	5.32%
Total		10,721	100%

==== District 32 ====
Summary of the 8–10 September 2023 Yaroslavl Oblast Duma election in District 32
Candidate	Party	Votes	%
Nikolay Biruk (incumbent)	United Russia	6,515	69.38%
Andrey Mitrofanov	Communists of Russia	1,232	13.12%
Ivan Lobanov	New People	783	8.34%
Roman Skornyakov	Liberal Democratic Party	639	6.81%
Total		9,390	100%

==== District 33 ====
Summary of the 8–10 September 2023 Yaroslavl Oblast Duma election in District 33
Candidate	Party	Votes	%
Pavel Isayev (incumbent)	United Russia	6,113	66.96%
Vladimir Kozlov	A Just Russia – For Truth	942	10.32%
Yury Komogortsev	Communist Party	842	9.22%
Yelena Uspenskaya	Liberal Democratic Party	507	5.55%
Yevgeny Petrov	New People	247	2.71%
Valentina Korotayeva	Communists of Russia	245	2.68%
Total		9,130	100%

==== District 34 ====
Summary of the 8–10 September 2023 Yaroslavl Oblast Duma election in District 34
Candidate	Party	Votes	%
Mikhail Nikeshin (incumbent)	United Russia	4,301	57.21%
Aleksey Guryev	Liberal Democratic Party	1,438	19.13%
Vadim Noginov	A Just Russia – For Truth	611	8.13%
Yegor Ostrogradsky	Communist Party	498	6.62%
Ksenia Dolgina	Communists of Russia	426	5.67%
Total		7,518	100%

== See also ==
- 2023 Russian regional elections
