= Yaroslavl constituency =

Russian Legislative constituency in Yaroslavl Oblast

Yaroslavl single-member constituency
- Constituency of the Russian State Duma

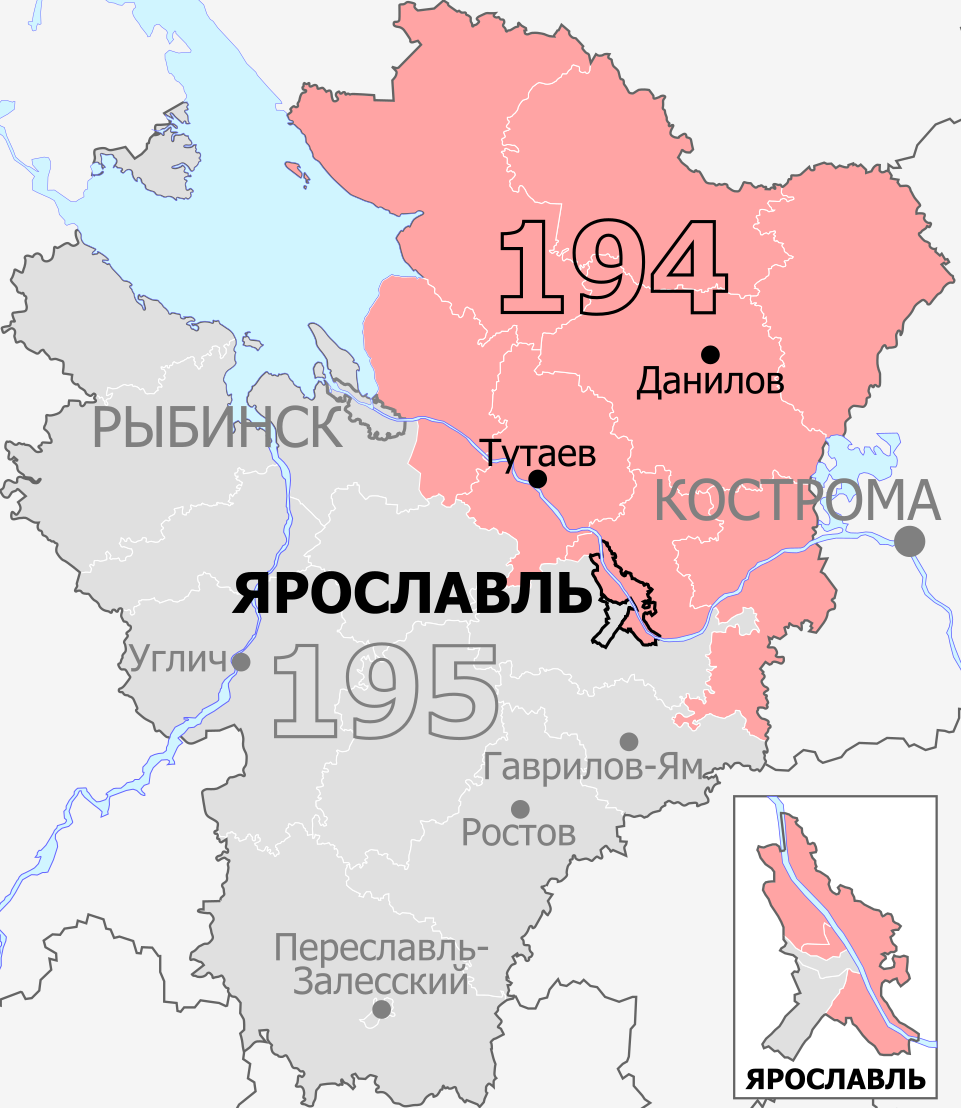
- Constituency boundaries since 2016
- Deputy: Anatoly Lisitsyn; Independent
- Federal subject: Yaroslavl Oblast
- Districts: Danilovsky, Lyubimsky, Nekrasovsky, Pervomaysky, Poshekhonsky, Rybinsky (Arefinskoe, Nazarovskoe, Ogarkovskoe, Oktyabrskoe, Pesochnoe), Tutayevsky, Yaroslavl (Dzerzhinsky, Frunzensky, Leninsky, Zavolzhsky), Yaroslavsky (Kuznechikhinskoe, Lesnaya Polyana, Neksarovskoe, Zavolzhskoe)
- Voters: 513,393 (2026)

The Yaroslavl constituency (No.193 (Note: Kirovsky constituency No.189 in 1993-2007, No.194 in 2016–2026)) is a Russian legislative constituency in Yaroslavl Oblast. The constituency covers most of Yaroslavl and rural eastern Yaroslavl Oblast, including the towns Tutayev and Danilov.

The constituency has been represented since 2021 by Independent deputy Anatoly Lisitsyn, former Senator, Member of State Duma and Governor of Yaroslavl Oblast, who won the seat as A Just Russia – For Truth candidate defeating one-term United Russia incumbent Andrey Kovalenko. Lisitsyn left A Just Russia in March 2026 to run in the United Russia primary and was expelled from the faction.

== Boundaries ==
1993–1995 Kirovsky constituency: Tutayev, Yaroslavl, Yaroslavsky District
The constituency covered the oblast capital Yaroslavl, all of its suburbs and historic town Tutayev to the north.

1995–2007 Kirovsky constituency: Nekrasovsky District, Yaroslavl, Yaroslavsky District
After the 1995 redistricting the constituency was slightly altered, swapping Tutayev for rural eastern Nekrasovsky District with Rybinsk constituency.

2016–present: Danilovsky District, Lyubimsky District, Nekrasovsky District, Pervomaysky District, Poshekhonsky District, Rybinsky District (Arefinskoye, Nazarovskoye, Ogarkovskoye, Oktyabrskoye, Pesochnoye), Tutayevsky District, Yaroslavl (Dzerzhinsky, Frunzensky, Leninsky, Zavolzhsky), Yaroslavsky District (Kuznechikhinskoye, Lesnaya Polyana, Neksarovskoye, Zavolzhskoye)
The constituency was re-created for the 2016 election under the name "Yaroslavl constituency" and retained only part of its former territory, losing central and south-western Yaroslavl as well as its southern and western suburbs to Rostov constituency. This seat instead gained mostly rural eastern Yaroslavl Oblast from the former Rybinsk constituency.

== Members elected ==
Election	Member	Party
1993	Yevgenia Tishkovskaya	Independent
1995	Yelena Mizulina	Yabloko
1999	Sergey Zagidullin	Independent
2003	Yevgeny Zayashnikov	United Russia
2007	Proportional representation - no election by constituency	
2011	Proportional representation - no election by constituency	
2016	Aleksandr Gribov (Note: appointed as Deputy Chief of Staff of the Government of Russia in January 2020)	United Russia
2020	Andrey Kovalenko	United Russia
2021	Anatoly Lisitsyn	A Just Russia — For Truth
2026	Anatoly Lisitsyn	Independent

== Election results ==
=== 1993 ===
Summary of the 12 December 1993 Russian legislative election in the Kirovsky constituency
Candidate	Party	Votes	%
Yevgenia Tishkovskaya	Independent	65,603	22.28%
Anatoly Kashpirovsky	Liberal Democratic Party	53,246	18.08%
Ivan Yashchenko	Independent	41,639	14.14%
Yury Markovin	Choice of Russia	36,876	12.52%
Alfred Simonov	Russian Democratic Reform Movement	15,459	5.25%
against all		59,350	20.16%
Total		294,434	100%

=== 1995 ===
Summary of the 17 December 1995 Russian legislative election in the Kirovsky constituency
Candidate	Party	Votes	%
Yelena Mizulina	Yabloko	83,175	22.96%
Vladimir Varukhin	Democratic Russia and Free Trade Unions	39,266	10.84%
Sergey Zamorayev	Forward, Russia!	32,223	8.90%
Vladimir Smirnov	Communist Party	26,357	7.28%
Yevgenia Tishkovskaya (incumbent)	Ivan Rybkin Bloc	22,983	6.34%
Vasily Koposov	Independent	19,987	5.52%
Vera Shevchuk	Independent	16,830	4.65%
Gennady Fedorov	Liberal Democratic Party	16,499	4.55%
Andrey Generalov	Stable Russia	16,055	4.43%
Yevgeny Tyurin	Independent	14,848	4.10%
Boris Fomin	Independent	10,467	2.89%
Arkady Danilevich	Independent	6,670	1.84%
Nikolay Mitrofanov	Christian-Democratic Union - Christians of Russia	5,626	1.55%
Dmitry Dvoyeglazov	Independent	3,201	0.88%
against all		35,055	9.68%
Total		362,231	100%

=== 1999 ===
Summary of the 19 December 1999 Russian legislative election in the Kirovsky constituency
Candidate	Party	Votes	%
Sergey Zagidullin	Independent	86,499	23.56%
Aleksandr Tsvetkov	Independent	67,698	18.44%
Sergey Zamorayev	Independent	34,885	9.50%
Yelena Mizulina (incumbent)	Yabloko	33,027	8.99%
Vladimir Stepanov	Independent	29,759	8.10%
Vadim Romanov	Union of Right Forces	24,972	6.80%
Yevgeny Goryunov	Our Home – Russia	23,268	6.34%
Yevgenia Tishkovskaya	Fatherland – All Russia	9,390	2.56%
Aleksandr Simon	Independent	4,894	1.33%
Mikhail Kovalev	Independent	3,330	0.91%
Mikhail Kuznetsov	Russian Cause	3,118	0.85%
Vyacheslav Blatov	Congress of Russian Communities-Yury Boldyrev Movement	2,631	0.72%
Aleksey Naumov	Independent	1,940	0.53%
Fyodor Karpov	Andrey Nikolayev and Svyatoslav Fyodorov Bloc	1,745	0.48%
Valery Teplov	Independent	1,646	0.45%
Yelena Maslina	Independent	1,172	0.32%
Sergey Zheleznov	Spiritual Heritage	1,125	0.31%
against all		28,345	7.72%
Total		367,185	100%

=== 2003 ===
Summary of the 7 December 2003 Russian legislative election in the Kirovsky constituency
Candidate	Party	Votes	%
Yevgeny Zayashnikov	United Russia	91,798	28.19%
Aleksandr Tsvetkov	Independent	86,188	26.47%
Sergey Zagidullin (incumbent)	Rodina	42,582	13.08%
Maksim Geyko	Union of Right Forces	15,520	4.77%
Ivan Makushok	Communist Party	14,144	4.34%
Sergey Baburkin	Independent	8,446	2.59%
Yevgeny Goryunov	Party of Russia's Rebirth-Russian Party of Life	6,436	1.98%
Vladimir Durnev	Liberal Democratic Party	4,233	1.30%
against all		48,381	14.86%
Total		326,308	100%

=== 2016 ===
Summary of the 18 September 2016 Russian legislative election in the Yaroslavl constituency
Candidate	Party	Votes	%
Aleksandr Gribov	United Russia	75,607	38.53%
Aleksandr Vorobyov	Communist Party	34,752	17.71%
Sergey Balabayev	A Just Russia	29,240	14.90%
Andrey Potapov	Liberal Democratic Party	19,039	9.70%
Andrey Vorobyev	Rodina	8,605	4.39%
Vladimir Zubkov	Yabloko	6,414	3.27%
Yaroslav Yudin	People's Freedom Party	3,655	1.86%
Sergey Agafonov	Communists of Russia	3,531	1.80%
Roman Fomichev	The Greens	3,339	1.70%
Anton Artemyev	Party of Growth	2,895	1.48%
Ivan Sinitsyn	Patriots of Russia	2,639	1.34%
Total		196,237	100%

=== 2020 ===
Results by district: Andrey Kovalenko: 30–40% 40–50% 50–60%; Anatoly Lisitsyn: 30–40% 40–50%

Summary of the 13 September 2020 Russian by-election in the Yaroslavl constituency
Candidate	Party	Votes	%
Andrey Kovalenko	United Russia	47,562	40.27%
Anatoly Lisitsyn	A Just Russia	40,407	34.21%
Yelena Kuznetsova	Communist Party	13,817	11.70%
Oleg Vinogradov	Yabloko	4,578	3.88%
Irina Lobanova	Liberal Democratic Party	4,049	3.43%
Vladimir Vorozhtsov	Party of Pensioners	2,188	1.85%
Oleg Bulayev	Communist Party of Social Justice	1,380	1.17%
Oksana Romashkova	Communists of Russia	1,356	1.15%
Total		118,108	100%

=== 2021 ===
Results by district: Anatoly Lisitsyn: 30–40% 40–50%; Andrey Kovalenko: 30–40%

Summary of the 17-19 September 2021 Russian legislative election in the Yaroslavl constituency
Candidate	Party	Votes	%
Anatoly Lisitsyn	A Just Russia — For Truth	77,888	36.47%
Andrey Kovalenko (incumbent)	United Russia	58,243	27.27%
Yelena Kuznetsova	Communist Party	32,153	15.05%
Vladislav Miroshnichenko	New People	10,537	4.93%
Irina Lobanova	Liberal Democratic Party	8,332	3.90%
Yulia Ovchinnikova	Party of Pensioners	6,473	3.03%
Dmitry Petrovsky	Communists of Russia	6,038	2.83%
Sergey Balabayev	Yabloko	5,558	2.60%
Dmitry Trusov	The Greens	3,601	1.69%
Total		213,580	100%

=== 2026 ===
Summary of the 18-20 September 2026 Russian legislative election in the Yaroslavl constituency
Candidate	Party	Votes	%
Anatoly Lisitsyn (incumbent)	Independent	68,582	33.35%
Yelena Kuznetsova	Communist Party	38,209	18.58%
Anna Skroznikova	New People	35,994	17.51%
Anatoly Kashirin	A Just Russia	19,497	9.48%
Aleksey Guryev	Liberal Democratic Party	19,023	9.25%
Yulia Ovchinnikova	Party of Pensioners	8,911	4.33%
Dmitry Trusov	The Greens	6,330	3.08%
Dmitry Golubyatnikov	Rodina	3,411	1.66%
Total		205,620	100%

== See also ==
- Rostov constituency
