= Rostov constituency (Yaroslavl Oblast) =

Legislative constituency in Russia

Rostov single-member constituency
- Constituency of the Russian State Duma

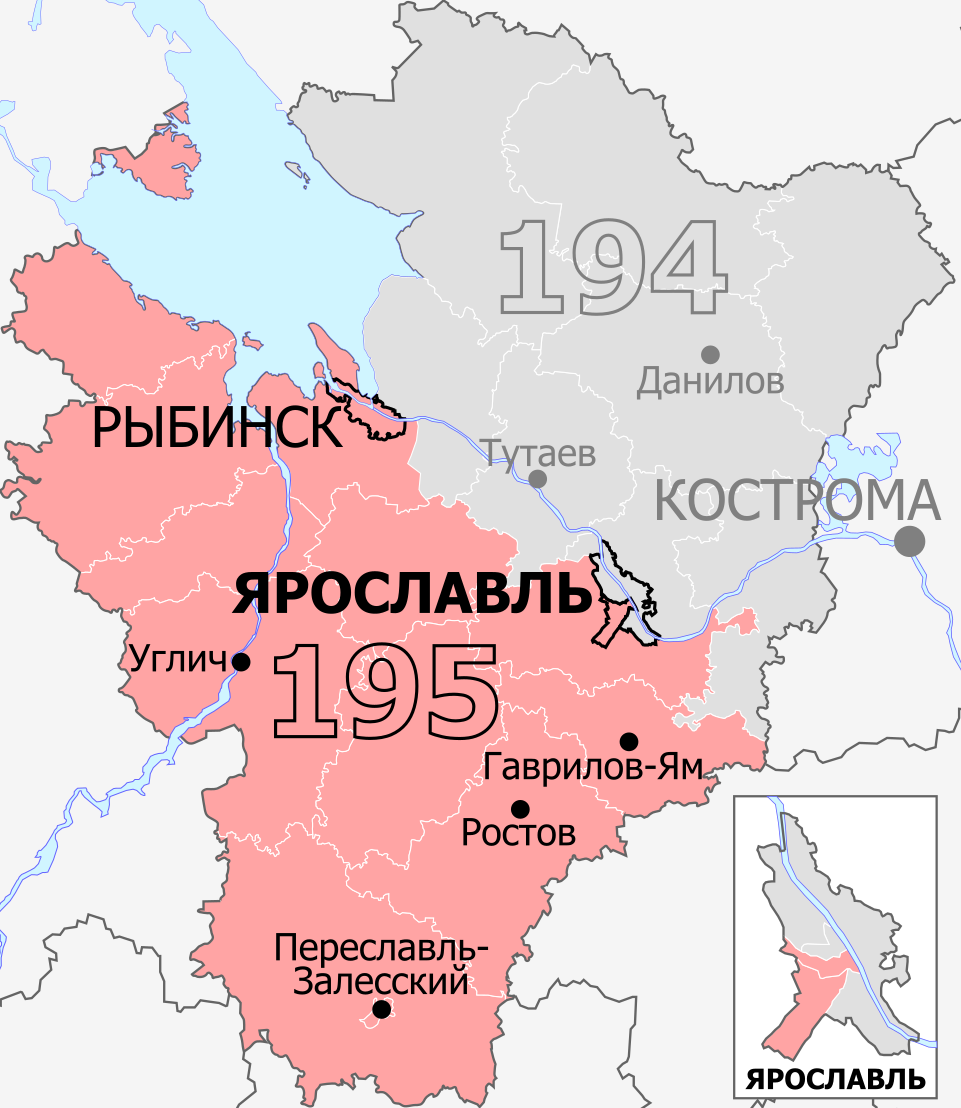
- Constituency boundaries since 2016
- Deputy: Artyom Molchanov; United Russia
- Federal subject: Yaroslavl Oblast
- Districts: Bolsheselsky, Borisoglebsky, Breytovsky, Gavrilov-Yamsky, Myshkinsky, Nekouzsky, Pereslavl-Zalessky, Pereslavsky, Rostovsky, Rybinsk, Rybinsky (Glebovskoe, Kamennikovskoe, Pokrovskoe, Sudoverfskoe, Tikhmenevskoe, Volzhskoe), Uglichsky, Yaroslavl (Kirovsky, Krasnoperekopsky), Yaroslavsky (Ivnyakovskoe, Karabikhskoe, Kurbskoe, Tunoshenskoe)
- Voters: 466,668 (2026)

The Rostov constituency (No.194 (Note: Rybinsk constituency No.190 in 1993-2007, No.195 in 2016–2026)) is a Russian legislative constituency in Yaroslavl Oblast. The constituency covers south-western Yaroslavl and western Yaroslavl Oblast, including an industrial city Rybinsk as well as historic towns Gavrilov-Yam, Pereslavl-Zalessky, Rostov Veliky and Uglich.

The constituency has been represented since 2026 by United Russia deputy Artyom Molchanov, former Yaroslavl mayor and Deputy Premier of Yaroslavl Oblast, who defeated eight-term A Just Russia incumbent Anatoly Greshnevikov.

== Boundaries ==
1993–1995 Rybinsk constituency: Bolsheselsky District, Borisoglebsky District, Breytovsky District, Danilovsky District, Gavrilov-Yamsky District, Lyubimsky District, Myshkinsky District, Nekrasovsky District, Nekouzsky District, Pereslavl-Zalessky, Pereslavsky District, Pervomaysky District, Poshekhonsky District, Rostovsky District, Rybinsk, Rybinsky District, Uglichsky District
The constituency covered most of Yaroslavl Oblast, except Yaroslavl, its suburbs and Tutayev.

1995–2007 Rybinsk constituency: Bolsheselsky District, Borisoglebsky District, Breytovsky District, Danilovsky District, Gavrilov-Yamsky District, Lyubimsky District, Myshkinsky District, Nekouzsky District, Pereslavl-Zalessky, Pereslavsky District, Pervomaysky District, Poshekhonsky District, Rostovsky District, Rybinsk, Rybinsky District, Tutayevsky District, Uglichsky District
After the 1995 redistricting the constituency was slightly altered, swapping rural eastern Nekrasovsky District for Tutayev with Kirovsky constituency.

2016–present: Bolsheselsky District, Borisoglebsky District, Breytovsky District, Gavrilov-Yamsky District, Myshkinsky District, Nekouzsky District, Pereslavl-Zalessky, Pereslavsky District, Rostovsky District, Rybinsk, Rybinsky District (Glebovskoye, Kamennikovskoye, Pokrovskoye, Sudoverfskoye, Tikhmenevskoye, Volzhskoye), Uglichsky District, Yaroslavl (Kirovsky, Krasnoperekopsky), Yaroslavsky District (Ivnyakovskoye, Karabikhskoye, Kurbskoye, Tunoshenskoye)
The constituency was re-created for the 2016 election under the name "Rostov constituency" and retained only its western half, losing rural eastern Yaroslavl Oblast to Yaroslavl constituency. This seat gained central and south-western Yaroslavl as well as its southern and western suburbs from the former Kirovsky constituency.

== Members elected ==
| Election | Member | Party |
|---|---|---|
| 1993 | Anatoly Greshnevikov | Independent |
| 1995 | Anatoly Greshnevikov | Power to the People! |
| 1999 | Anatoly Greshnevikov | Russian All-People's Union |
| 2003 | Anatoly Greshnevikov | Rodina |
| 2007 | Proportional representation - no election by constituency | |
| 2011 | Proportional representation - no election by constituency | |
| 2016 | Anatoly Greshnevikov | A Just Russia — For Truth |
| 2021 | Anatoly Greshnevikov | A Just Russia — For Truth |
| 2026 | Artyom Molchanov | United Russia |

== Election results ==
=== 1993 ===
Summary of the 12 December 1993 Russian legislative election in the Rybinsk constituency
| Candidate | Party | Votes | % |
|---|---|---|---|
| Anatoly Greshnevikov | Independent | 68,243 | 21.34% |
| Dmitry Andriyenko | Independent | 47,562 | 14.87% |
| Boris Surkov | Choice of Russia | 30,135 | 9.42% |
| Vladimir Zharkovsky | Russian Democratic Reform Movement | 28,061 | 8.77% |
| Vyacheslav Malchikov | Future of Russia–New Names | 22,555 | 7.05% |
| Igor Lednev | Liberal Democratic Party | 20,973 | 6.56% |
| Sergey Moshkov | Party of Russian Unity and Accord | 16,712 | 5.22% |
| Igor Golov | Independent | 9,136 | 2.86% |
| against all | | 56,538 | 17.68% |
| Total | | 319,862 | 100% |

=== 1995 ===
Summary of the 17 December 1995 Russian legislative election in the Rybinsk constituency
| Candidate | Party | Votes | % |
|---|---|---|---|
| Anatoly Greshnevikov (incumbent) | Power to the People! | 122,400 | 31.45% |
| Galina Stepenko | Independent | 56,745 | 14.58% |
| Dmitry Andriyenko | Derzhava | 54,064 | 13.89% |
| Georgy Sadchikov | Yabloko | 42,522 | 10.93% |
| Aleksey Zvyagin | Liberal Democratic Party | 25,996 | 6.68% |
| Aleksandr Lazarev | Christian-Democratic Union - Christians of Russia | 20,104 | 5.17% |
| against all | | 57,179 | 14.69% |
| Total | | 389,188 | 100% |

=== 1999 ===
Summary of the 19 December 1999 Russian legislative election in the Rybinsk constituency
| Candidate | Party | Votes | % |
|---|---|---|---|
| Anatoly Greshnevikov (incumbent) | Russian All-People's Union | 131,108 | 34.38% |
| Tatyana Moskalkova | Yabloko | 74,243 | 19.47% |
| Oleg Rassadkin | Fatherland – All Russia | 55,658 | 14.60% |
| Anatoly Voropayev | Independent | 26,529 | 6.96% |
| Irina Dorofeyeva | Our Home – Russia | 20,773 | 5.45% |
| Yury Korechkov | Andrey Nikolayev and Svyatoslav Fyodorov Bloc | 13,824 | 3.63% |
| Lidia Kurlova | Liberal Democratic Party | 8,532 | 2.24% |
| Ivan Klimenko | Independent | 6,934 | 1.82% |
| against all | | 35,888 | 9.41% |
| Total | | 381,348 | 100% |

=== 2003 ===
Summary of the 7 December 2003 Russian legislative election in the Rybinsk constituency
| Candidate | Party | Votes | % |
|---|---|---|---|
| Anatoly Greshnevikov (incumbent) | Rodina | 213,178 | 64.61% |
| Dmitry Yevseyev | Independent | 17,958 | 5.44% |
| Dmitry Starodubtsev | Agrarian Party | 17,284 | 5.24% |
| Dmitry Shatsky | Party of Russia's Rebirth-Russian Party of Life | 12,310 | 3.73% |
| Ruslan Popovich | United Russia | 9,207 | 2.79% |
| Natalya Lazareva | Independent | 6,511 | 1.97% |
| Vladimir Poryvkin | Liberal Democratic Party | 4,247 | 1.29% |
| Olga Kutuzova | Independent | 4,122 | 1.25% |
| Aleksandr Bogdanov | United Russian Party Rus' | 2,957 | 0.90% |
| Viktor Myanko | Development of Enterprise | 2,139 | 0.65% |
| against all | | 33,789 | 10.24% |
| Total | | 330,373 | 100% |

=== 2016 ===
Summary of the 18 September 2016 Russian legislative election in the Rostov constituency
| Candidate | Party | Votes | % |
|---|---|---|---|
| Anatoly Greshnevikov | A Just Russia | 79,354 | 41.88% |
| Vladimir Denisov | Rodina | 22,722 | 11.99% |
| Mikhail Paramonov | Communist Party | 21,592 | 11.39% |
| Ilya Chikhalov | Liberal Democratic Party | 19,518 | 10.30% |
| Konstantin Kurchenkov | The Greens | 12,608 | 6.65% |
| Boris Loginov | Yabloko | 7,315 | 3.86% |
| Yevgeny Tarlo | Party of Growth | 5,968 | 3.15% |
| Stanislav Smirnov | Communists of Russia | 5,905 | 3.12% |
| Aleksey Povasin | Patriots of Russia | 4,390 | 2.32% |
| Total | | 189,502 | 100% |

=== 2021 ===
Results by district: Anatoly Greshnevikov: 30–40% 40–50%; Larisa Ushakova: 30–40% 40–50%

Summary of the 17-19 September 2021 Russian legislative election in the Rostov constituency
| Candidate | Party | Votes | % |
|---|---|---|---|
| Anatoly Greshnevikov (incumbent) | A Just Russia — For Truth | 73,142 | 34.27% |
| Larisa Ushakova | United Russia | 62,566 | 29.31% |
| Oleg Leontyev | Communist Party | 22,261 | 10.43% |
| Artyom Denisov | Communists of Russia | 12,701 | 5.95% |
| Vladimir Karpov | New People | 10,604 | 4.97% |
| Yevgeny Smirnov | Liberal Democratic Party | 7,437 | 3.48% |
| Aleksandr Dolgushin | Party of Pensioners | 7,073 | 3.31% |
| Vladimir Gusev | The Greens | 3,914 | 1.83% |
| Aleksey Kudryashov | Russian Party of Freedom and Justice | 3,107 | 1.46% |
| Vasily Tsependa | Yabloko | 3,058 | 1.43% |
| Aleksandr Dobychin | Rodina | 1,923 | 0.90% |
| Total | | 213,457 | 100% |

=== 2026 ===
Summary of the 18-20 September 2026 Russian legislative election in the Rostov constituency
| Candidate | Party | Votes | % |
|---|---|---|---|
| Artyom Molchanov | United Russia | 68,423 | 33.28% |
| Anatoly Greshnevikov (incumbent) | A Just Russia | 46,929 | 22.83% |
| Mikhail Paramonov | Communist Party | 25,287 | 12.30% |
| Aleksey Gorokhov | New People | 16,941 | 8.24% |
| Sergey Balabayev | Yabloko | 16,046 | 7.80% |
| Aleksandr Kazinets | Liberal Democratic Party | 12,058 | 5.86% |
| Andrey Buryanovaty | Party of Pensioners | 7,193 | 3.50% |
| Maria Burtseva | Rodina | 3,902 | 1.90% |
| Denis Shubin | The Greens | 3,867 | 1.88% |
| Total | | 205,594 | 100% |

== See also ==
- Yaroslavl constituency
