= Nikolai Kovalenko =

Russian and American ice hockey player (born 1999)

- Born: October 17, 1999 (age 26) Raleigh, North Carolina, U.S.
- Height: 5 ft 10 in (178 cm)
- Weight: 174 lb (79 kg; 12 st 6 lb)
- Position: Right wing
- Shoots: Left
- KHL team Former teams: CSKA Moscow; Lokomotiv Yaroslavl; Ak Bars Kazan; Torpedo Nizhny Novgorod; Colorado Avalanche; San Jose Sharks
- National team: Russia
- NHL draft: 171st overall, 2018; Colorado Avalanche
- Playing career: 2018–present

Nikolai Andreyevich Kovalenko (Russian: Николай Андреевич Коваленко; born October 17, 1999) is a Russian and American professional ice hockey right wing for HC CSKA Moscow of the Kontinental Hockey League (KHL). He was selected in the sixth round, 171st overall, by the Colorado Avalanche in the 2018 NHL entry draft. He is the son of former NHL player Andrei Kovalenko.

== Early life ==
Kovalenko was born in Raleigh, North Carolina, at the beginning of the 1999–2000 season, in which his father, Andrei Kovalenko, was playing with the Carolina Hurricanes of the National Hockey League. Kovalenko returned to Russia as a two-year-old following the conclusion of Andrei's nine-year career in the NHL, and lived in Yaroslavl.

== Playing career ==
Kovalenko learned to play as a youth within the ranks of the Lokomotiv Yaroslavl hockey school, while his father played with the KHL club. Unable to play in the renowned style of his father, who was known as "The Tank", Nikolai focused on a more technical skill-based game. He made his debut in the MHL with Loko Yaroslavl during the 2015–16 season, scoring four goals and five points in four games as a 16-year-old. Showing offensive potential through Loko's second-tier junior club, Loko juniors, Kovalenko was promoted to remain for the majority of the 2016–17 season in the MHL, producing a modest 14 points in 35 games.

Continuing in the MHL in the 2017–18 season, Kovalenko's improved strength was evident as he increased his offensive output with Loko, scoring 10 goals and 31 points in just 33 games and appearing in the MHL All-Star Game. On February 27, 2018, he was promoted to make his professional debut in the Kontinental Hockey League as an 18-year-old, playing 11 minutes in a 2–0 road victory over Spartak Moscow. Remaining on the roster for the playoffs, Kovalenko made his post-season debut in the first-round series victory over Torpedo Nizhny Novgorod, and appeared scoreless in four post-season games before he was returned to the MHL following defeat to SKA Saint Petersburg. Kovalenko continued upon his successful season in producing 12 points in 13 playoff games with Loko, helping capture the Kharlamov Cup.

Gaining the attention of NHL scouts, Kovalenko was ranked 33rd amongst international skaters, before he was selected in the sixth round, 171st overall, by the Colorado Avalanche in the 2018 NHL entry draft. He followed in his father's footsteps who was drafted by the Quebec Nordiques in the 1990 NHL entry draft and played three-plus seasons with the Quebec/Colorado franchise.

On August 2, 2018, Kovalenko was signed to an improved three-year contract to continue his development and remain within Lokomotiv Yaroslavl. In the 2018–19 season, Kovalenko scored his first professional goal in an opening night 5–0 victory over Sibir Novosibirsk on September 4, 2018. Playing in a reduced role due to his youth, Kovalenko still contributed offensively, scoring two goals, including the game-winner, in a 4–3 victory over HC Vityaz on September 20, 2018. He was later named as the KHL's best rookie of the week for a second occasion.

In the 2019–20 season, Kovalenko returned on his potential in establishing himself within the top-nine forwards and recording career bests with 10 goals, 11 assists, and 21 points through 54 regular season games with Lokomotiv. In his final season under contract with Lokomotiv while under the guidance of new head coach, Craig McTavish, Kovalenko struggled to make an impression. With MacTavish later replaced by Andrei Skabelka, Kovalenko was unable to replicate his previous season contributions, totalling just six goals and 11 points through the 2020–21 season.

On May 25, 2021, Kovalenko was signed to a qualifying offer from rival club, Ak Bars Kazan, in which Lokomotiv chose not to match. Reuniting with head coach Dmitri Kvartalnov, Kovalenko agreed to a two-year contract with Ak Bars through 2023. In the 2021–22 season, Kovalenko after a promising start with Ak Bars, was limited through injuries by appearing in just 29 games and collecting six goals and 14 points. Unable to fully establish himself within the club, Kovalenko was granted an early release from the remaining year of his contract.

On May 26, 2022, Kovalenko was signed to a two-year contract through 2024 to join his third KHL outfit, Torpedo Nizhny Novgorod. Under the coaching of Hall of Famer Igor Larionov, Kovalenko immediately emerged as an offensive threat with Torpedo in the 2022–23 season. Appearing in a top-line role as an alternate captain, Kovalenko led the team in scoring and finished ninth in the KHL with career highs of 21 goals and 33 assists for 54 points through 56 games. In the post-season, Kovalenko continued to lead Torpedo's offense, contributing seven points through 10 games as the team reached the Conference Semi-finals for the first time since 2016.

Kovalenko and Torpedo mutually agreed to terminate the final season of his contract to sign a two-year, entry-level contract with the Colorado Avalanche on July 26, 2023. In condition for the release of his KHL contract, Kovalenko was returned on loan by the Avalanche to continue his tenure with Torpedo through the 2023–24 season.

On April 28, 2024, Kovalenko made his NHL debut with the Colorado Avalanche in a 5–1 win over the Winnipeg Jets in game four of the first round of the 2024 Stanley Cup playoffs.

Entering his first full season in North America in the 2024–25 season, Kovalenko made the opening night roster to remain with the Avalanche. Following 28 appearances, in posting four goals and eight points, Kovalenko coincidently mirrored his father's brief tenure with the Avalanche as he was traded alongside fellow Russian Alexandar Georgiev, a 2025 conditional fifth-round pick and a second-round pick in the 2026 NHL entry draft, to the San Jose Sharks in exchange for Mackenzie Blackwood, Givani Smith and a fifth-round pick in the 2027 NHL entry draft on December 9, 2024.

Making his debut with the Sharks on 10 December 2024 against the Carolina Hurricanes, Kovalenko was initially slotted in a top line role and responded by recording a career high 3 points, during a 4-3 victory over the St. Louis Blues in just his second appearance for San Jose on 12 December 2024. Having increased his offensive output with the Sharks, Kovalenko's role decreased as he was sidelined through injury. Kovalenko completed the regular season, posting 12 points in 29 games, before reports of discontent between the Sharks and Kovalenko were made public. As a result, Kovalenko was not tendered a qualifying offer by the Sharks and was released as a free agent.

On 3 July 2025, Kovalenko's KHL rights were traded by Torpedo Nizhny Novgorod to perennial contending club, CSKA Moscow, in exchange for Egor Sokolov. Opting to return to the KHL after just one season in North America, Kovalenko agreed to terms with CKSA in signing a two-year contract on 12 July 2025.

== International play ==
Medal record

Representing Russia

Ice hockey

World Junior Championships
Bronze medal – third place	2019 Canada	

Kovalenko first represented Russia at the junior level at the 2015 World U-17 Hockey Challenge, playing six games. He went on to appear with Russia at the 2018 World Junior A Challenge, there, he would score a key goal in the Final, ending the tournament with three goals and five assists.

Kovalenko returned to the national stage after he was selected to the Russian team for the 2019 World Junior Championships in Vancouver, Canada. In Russia's second tournament game, Kovalenko was selected as the player of the game after scoring his first goal and point, notching the game-winner shorthanded, in a 2–1 victory over the Czech Republic on December 28, 2018. He ended the tournament with three points in six games, helping Russia claim the bronze medal against Switzerland on January 6, 2019.

== Career statistics ==
=== Regular season and playoffs ===
			Regular season					Playoffs
Season	Team	League	GP	G	A	Pts	PIM	GP	G	A	Pts	PIM
2015–16	Loko Yaroslavl	MHL	4	4	1	5	0	—	—	—	—	—
2015–16	Loko-Junior Yaroslavl	MHLB	17	6	12	18	8	—	—	—	—	—
2016–17	Loko Yaroslavl	MHL	35	3	11	14	35	3	0	1	1	12
2016–17	Loko-Junior Yaroslavl	NMHL	2	3	5	8	0	9	1	5	6	6
2017–18	Loko Yaroslavl	MHL	33	10	21	31	34	13	1	11	12	22
2017–18	Loko-Junior Yaroslavl	NMHL	2	1	1	2	0	—	—	—	—	—
2017–18	Lokomotiv Yaroslavl	KHL	2	0	0	0	0	4	0	0	0	7
2018–19	Lokomotiv Yaroslavl	KHL	33	5	1	6	14	7	0	2	2	2
2018–19	Loko Yaroslavl	MHL	—	—	—	—	—	11	3	6	9	8
2019–20	Lokomotiv Yaroslavl	KHL	54	10	11	21	26	6	0	0	0	0
2020–21	Lokomotiv Yaroslavl	KHL	41	6	5	11	12	9	0	1	1	4
2021–22	Ak Bars Kazan	KHL	29	6	8	14	12	6	0	1	1	2
2022–23	Torpedo Nizhny Novgorod	KHL	56	21	33	54	36	10	3	4	7	8
2023–24	Torpedo Nizhny Novgorod	KHL	42	11	24	35	30	5	0	4	4	10
2023–24	Colorado Eagles	AHL	4	1	2	3	2	2	1	0	1	4
2023–24	Colorado Avalanche	NHL	—	—	—	—	—	2	0	0	0	0
2024–25	Colorado Avalanche	NHL	28	4	4	8	10	—	—	—	—	—
2024–25	San Jose Sharks	NHL	29	3	9	12	6	—	—	—	—	—
2025–26	CSKA Moscow	KHL	66	12	19	31	34	10	2	6	8	4
KHL totals			323	71	102	173	164	57	5	18	23	37
NHL totals			57	7	13	20	16	2	0	0	0	0

=== International ===
Year	Team	Event	Result	GP	G	A	Pts	PIM
2015	Russia	U17	2nd place, silver medalist(s)	6	0	0	0	2
2019	Russia	WJC	3rd place, bronze medalist(s)	6	1	2	3	12
Junior totals				12	1	2	3	14

== Awards and honours ==
Award	Year
MHL
Forward of the Month (December)	2017–18
All-Star Game	2018
Kharlamov Cup (Loko Yaroslavl)	2018
