= Anatoly Greshnevikov =

Russian politician (born 1956)

Anatoly Greshnevikov MP
- Анатолий Грешневиков
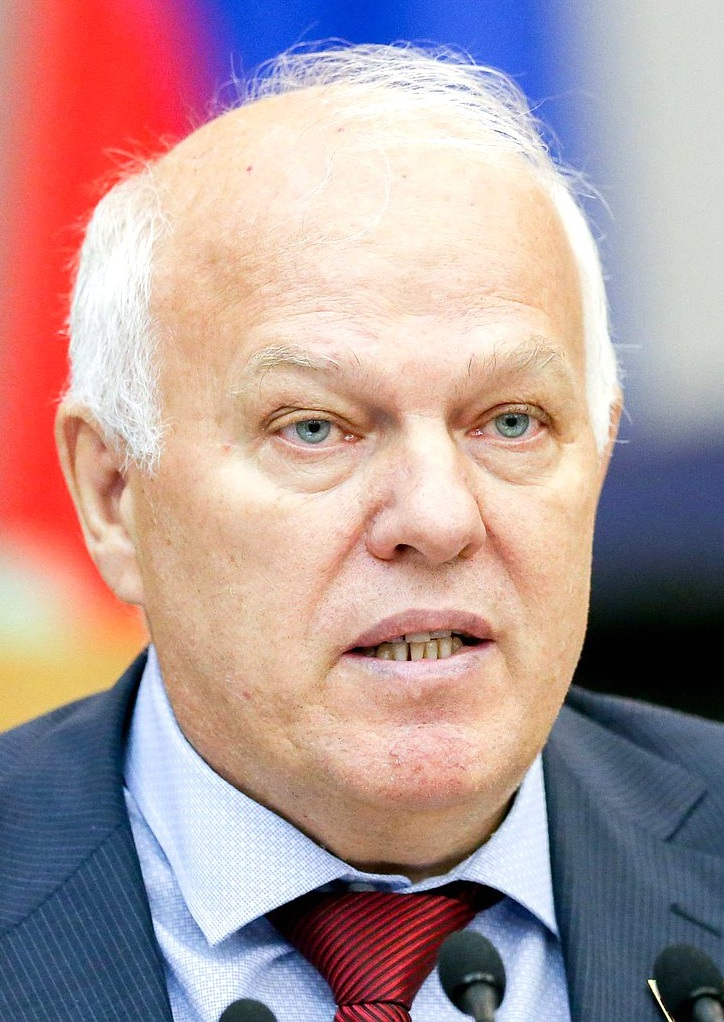

Member of the State Duma (Party list seat)
- Incumbent
- Assumed office 30 September 2026
- In office 24 December 2007 – 5 October 2016

Member of the State Duma for Yaroslavl Oblast
- In office 5 October 2016 – 30 September 2026
- Preceded by: constituency re-established
- Succeeded by: Artyom Molchanov
- Constituency: Rostov (No. 195)
- In office 11 January 1994 – 24 December 2007
- Preceded by: constituency established
- Succeeded by: constituencies abolished
- Constituency: Rybinsk (No. 190) (Note: renamed and renumbered to Rostov (No. 195) in 2016.)

Personal details
- Born: 29 August 1956 (age 70) Krasnodubrovsky, Zavyalovsky District, Altai Krai, Russian SFSR, Soviet Union
- Party: A Just Russia
- Children: Evgeny; Dmitry
- Education: Leningrad State University

Anatoly Nikolaevich Greshnevikov (Russian: Анатолий Николаевич Грешневиков; born August 29, 1956, Krasnodubrovsky, Zavyalovsky District, Altai Krai) is a Russian political figure and a deputy of the 1st, 2nd, 3rd, 4th, 5th, 6th, 7th, and 8th State Dumas.

From 1974 to 1976, Greshnevikov served at the Group of Soviet Forces in Germany. From 1982 to 1990, he worked as a journalist at the Borisoglebsk regional newspaper Novoe Vremya. From 1990 to 1993, he was the deputy of the Congress of People's Deputies of Russia. During the 1993 Russian constitutional crisis he stood for the side of the Supreme Soviet of Russia. In December 1993, he was elected deputy of the 1st State Duma from the Yaroslavl Oblast constituency. On December 17, 1995, he became the deputy of the 2nd State Duma. Later he was re-elected for the 3rd, 4th, 5th, 6th, 7th, and 8th State Dumas, respectively.

== Sanctions ==
In December 2022 the EU sanctioned Anatoly Greshnevikov in relation to the 2022 Russian invasion of Ukraine.

== Awards ==
- Order of Friendship
- Order "For Merit to the Fatherland"
