= Andrei Kovalenko =

Russian ice hockey player

Andrei Kovalenko MP
- Андрей Коваленко
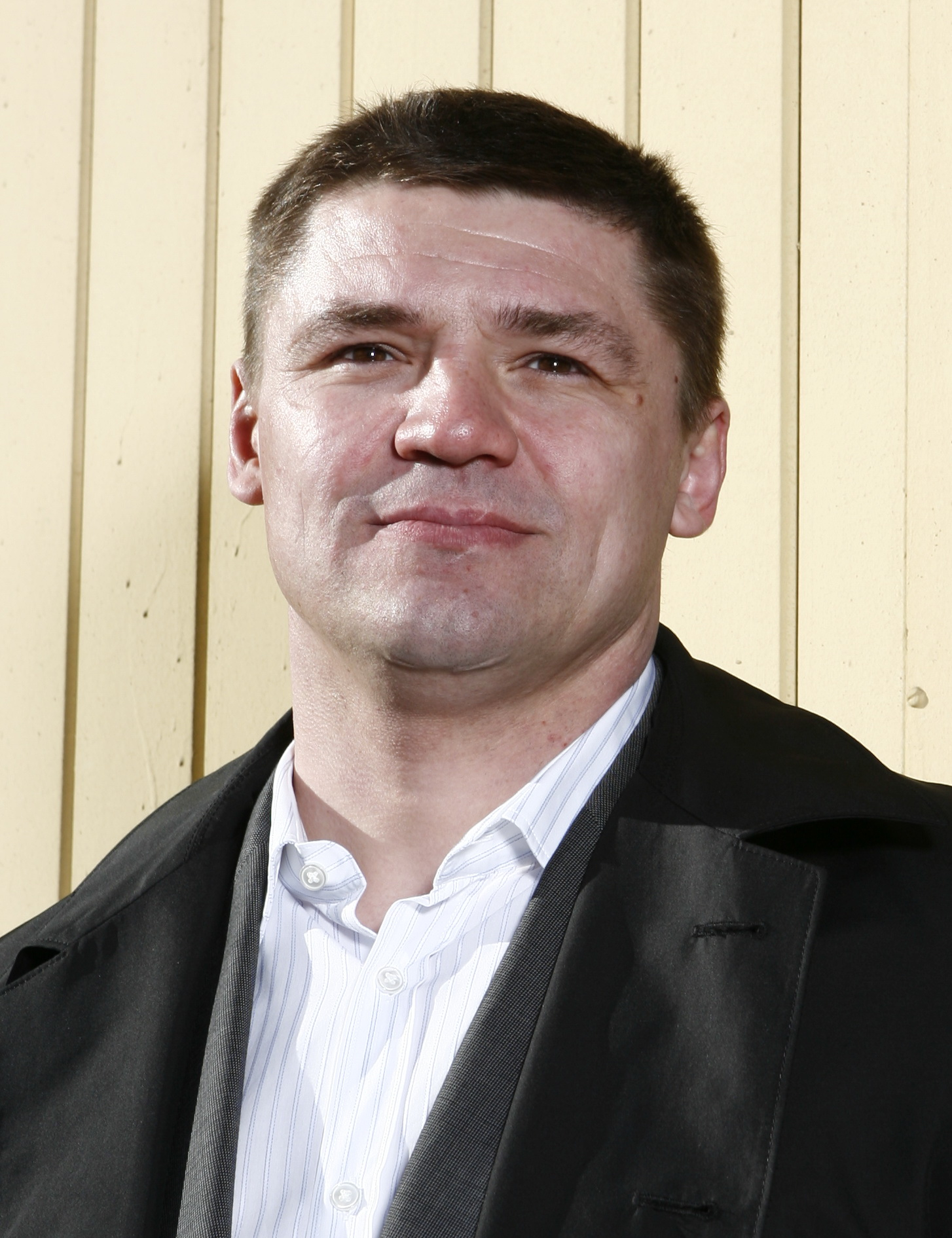
- Kovalenko in 2010

Member of the State Duma for Yaroslavl Oblast
- In office 23 September 2020 – 12 October 2021
- Preceded by: Aleksandr Gribov
- Succeeded by: Anatoly Lisitsyn
- Constituency: (No. 194)

Personal details
- Born: 7 June 1970 (age 56) Balakovo, RSFSR, USSR
- Party: United Russia
Ice hockey career
- Height: 180 cm (5 ft 11 in)
- Weight: 103 kg (227 lb; 16 st 3 lb)
- Position: Right Wing
- Shot: Left
- Played for: Torpedo Gorky; CSKA Moscow; Quebec Nordiques; HC Lada Togliatti; Colorado Avalanche; Montreal Canadiens; Edmonton Oilers; Philadelphia Flyers; Carolina Hurricanes; Boston Bruins; Lokomotiv Yaroslavl; Avangard Omsk; Severstal Cherepovets
- National team: Soviet Union, Unified Team and Russia
- NHL draft: 148th overall, 1990; Quebec Nordiques
- Playing career: 1987–2008
Medal record
Men's ice hockey
Representing Soviet Union
World Junior Championships
Silver medal – second place	1990 Finland
Representing Unified Team
Olympic Games
Gold medal – first place	1992 Albertville
Representing Russia
Olympic Games
Silver medal – second place	1998 Nagano
World Championships
Silver medal – second place	2002 Sweden

Andrei Nikolaevich Kovalenko (Russian: Андрей Николаевич Коваленко; born 7 June 1970) is a Russian former professional ice hockey forward. He played in the National Hockey League (NHL) with the Quebec Nordiques, Colorado Avalanche, Montreal Canadiens, Edmonton Oilers, Philadelphia Flyers, Carolina Hurricanes and the Boston Bruins. He is currently the chairman of the Kontinental Hockey League players association (KHL PA).

He is the father of former NHL player Nikolai Kovalenko, who played for the San Jose Sharks and Colorado Avalanche, and currently plays for HC CSKA Moscow in the Kontinental Hockey League.

== Playing career ==
Nicknamed "The Tank" by his teammates because of his immovable presence from the goal crease, Kovalenko was drafted 148th overall in the 1990 NHL entry draft by the Quebec Nordiques while playing in Russia for HC CSKA Moscow.

Kovalenko was traded from the Colorado Avalanche to the Montreal Canadiens with Jocelyn Thibault and Martin Ručinský for Patrick Roy and Mike Keane. In 1996, he scored the final goal in the history of the Montreal Forum, the fourth in a 4–1 victory over the Dallas Stars.

In 1999, Kovalenko scored the first goal in the history of the RBC Center as a member of the Carolina Hurricanes in a 4–2 loss to the New Jersey Devils.

Kovalenko last played in the National Hockey League in 2000–01 with the Boston Bruins, and finished his career playing in the Russian Super League for Lokomotiv Yaroslavl, Avangard Omsk, and Severstal Cherepovets.

Kovalenko is the father of Nikolai Kovalenko, who was drafted by the Colorado Avalanche in the 2018 NHL entry draft.

== Member of parliament ==
In September 2020 Kovalenko was elected deputy of the State Duma, Russia's lower house, at a special election in Yaroslavl constituency No. 194, defeating long-time governor of Yaroslavl Oblast Anatoly Lisitsyn from left-leaning A Just Russia. Kovalenko was a candidate of ruling United Russia. A year later, in the 2021 elections Lisitsyn won the constituency with 36.5% of the vote, while Kovalenko received 27.3%.

== Career statistics ==
=== Regular season and playoffs ===
			Regular season					Playoffs
Season	Team	League	GP	G	A	Pts	PIM	GP	G	A	Pts	PIM
1987–88	Torpedo Gorky	USSR	4	3	0	3	0	—	—	—	—	—
1988–89	CSKA Moscow	USSR	10	1	0	1	0	—	—	—	—	—
1988–89	SKA MVO Kalinin	USSR.2	30	8	7	15	29	—	—	—	—	—
1988–89	MCOP Moscow	USSR.3	1	0	0	0	0	—	—	—	—	—
1989–90	CSKA Moscow	USSR	48	8	5	13	20	—	—	—	—	—
1990–91	CSKA Moscow	USSR	45	13	8	21	26	—	—	—	—	—
1991–92	CSKA Moscow	CIS	36	16	11	27	28	8	3	2	5	4
1991–92	CSKA–2 Moscow	CIS.3	1	1	1	2	0	—	—	—	—	—
1992–93	CSKA Moscow	IHL	3	3	1	4	4	—	—	—	—	—
1992–93	Quebec Nordiques	NHL	81	27	41	68	57	4	1	0	1	2
1993–94	Quebec Nordiques	NHL	58	16	17	33	46	—	—	—	—	—
1994–95	Lada Togliatti	IHL	11	9	2	11	14	—	—	—	—	—
1994–95	Quebec Nordiques	NHL	45	14	10	24	31	6	0	1	1	2
1995–96	Colorado Avalanche	NHL	26	11	11	22	16	—	—	—	—	—
1995–96	Montreal Canadiens	NHL	51	17	17	34	33	6	0	0	0	6
1996–97	Edmonton Oilers	NHL	74	32	27	59	81	12	4	3	7	6
1997–98	Edmonton Oilers	NHL	59	6	17	23	28	1	0	0	0	2
1998–99	Edmonton Oilers	NHL	43	13	14	27	30	—	—	—	—	—
1998–99	Philadelphia Flyers	NHL	13	0	1	1	2	—	—	—	—	—
1998–99	Carolina Hurricanes	NHL	18	6	6	12	0	4	1	1	2	2
1999–2000	Carolina Hurricanes	NHL	76	15	24	39	38	—	—	—	—	—
2000–01	Boston Bruins	NHL	76	16	21	37	27	—	—	—	—	—
2001–02	Lokomotiv Yaroslavl	RSL	51	27	19	46	62	9	4	3	7	28
2002–03	Lokomotiv Yaroslavl	RSL	51	14	16	30	62	10	5	4	9	12
2003–04	Lokomotiv Yaroslavl	RSL	59	23	11	34	56	3	0	0	0	0
2004–05	Lokomotiv Yaroslavl	RSL	4	0	1	1	2	—	—	—	—	—
2004–05	Avangard Omsk	RSL	33	8	9	17	65	11	0	4	4	8
2005–06	Avangard Omsk	RSL	12	1	4	5	8	—	—	—	—	—
2005–06	Severstal Cherepovets	RSL	26	10	7	17	20	4	0	2	2	4
2006–07	Severstal Cherepovets	RSL	50	21	8	29	30	5	1	0	1	0
2007–08	Severstal Cherepovets	RSL	48	9	8	17	36	7	0	1	1	2
USSR/CIS totals			143	41	24	65	74	8	3	2	5	4
NHL totals			620	173	206	379	389	33	6	5	11	20
RSL totals			335	113	82	195	341	49	10	14	24	56

=== International ===
Year	Team	Event	Result	GP	G	A	Pts	PIM
1990	Soviet Union	WJC	2nd place, silver medalist(s)	7	5	6	11	8
1991	Soviet Union	CC	5th	5	1	2	3	10
1992	Unified Team	OG	1st place, gold medalist(s)	8	1	1	2	2
1992	Russia	WC	5th	6	3	1	4	2
1994	Russia	WC	5th	6	3	5	8	2
1996	Russia	WCH	SF	5	2	0	2	4
1998	Russia	OG	2nd place, silver medalist(s)	6	4	1	5	14
2000	Russia	WC	11th	6	0	0	0	0
2002	Russia	WC	2nd place, silver medalist(s)	8	0	4	4	4
2004	Russia	WCH	5th	2	0	0	0	6
Senior totals				52	14	14	28	44

== Awards and achievements ==
- Soviet championship: 1989 (with CSKA)
- European Ice Hockey Cup: 1990 (with CSKA)
- Russian championship: 2002 (with Lokomotiv Yaroslavl)
- Russian championship: 2003 (with Lokomotiv Yaroslavl)
- European Champions Cup: 2005 (with Avangard)
- Pajulahti Cup: 2006 (with Severstal)
