= Natalia Kosikhina =

Russian politician (born 1972)

Natalia Kosykhina
- Наталия Косихина
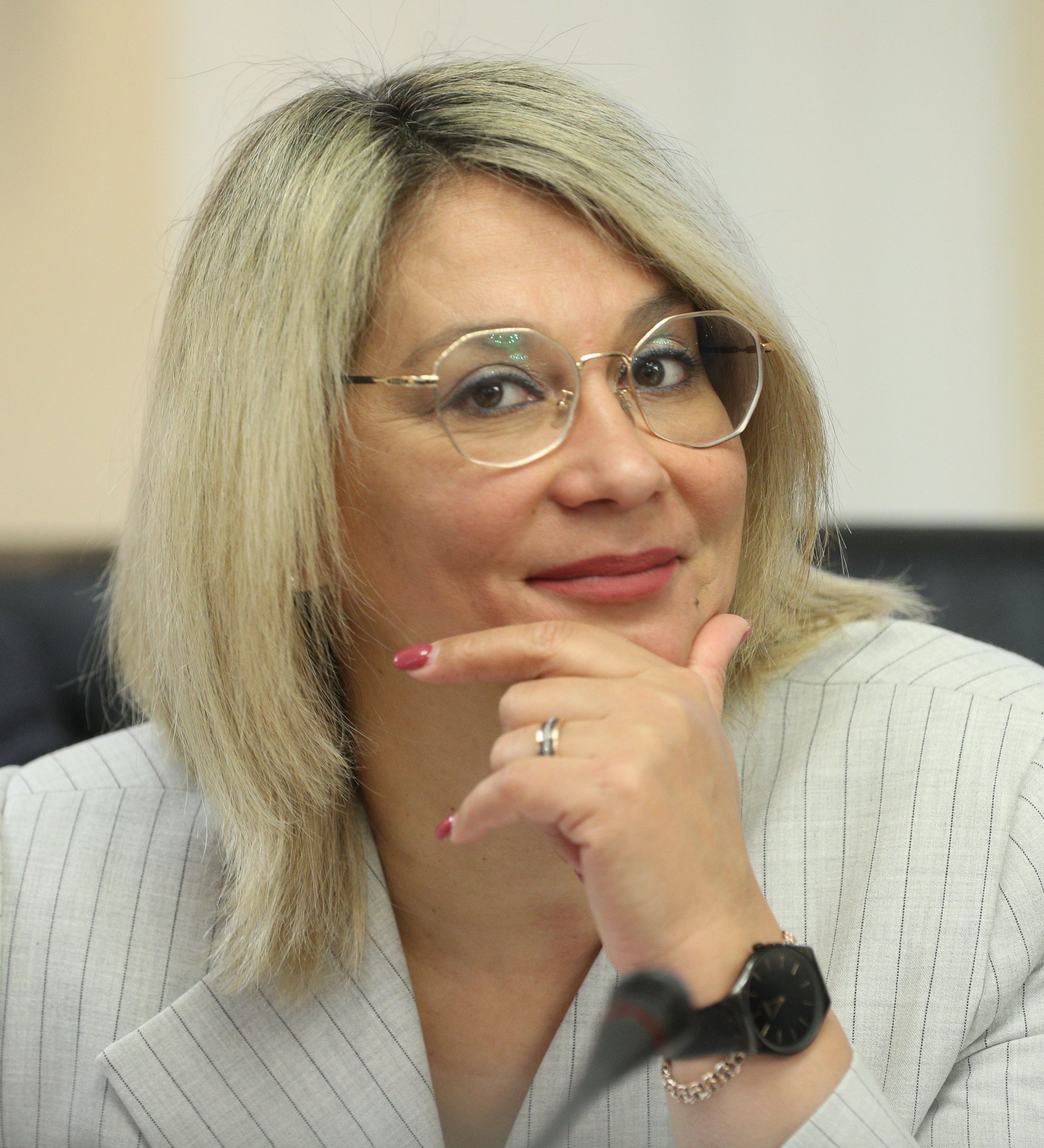

Senator from Yaroslavl Oblast
- Incumbent
- Assumed office September 25, 2018
- Preceded by: Anatoly Lisitsyn

Personal details
- Born: Natalia Kosykhina; 7 August 1972 (age 54) Danilov, Yaroslavl Oblast, Russian Soviet Socialist Republic, Soviet Union
- Party: United Russia
- Education: Yaroslavl Pedagogical College

Natalia Vladimirovna Kosykhina (Russian: Наталия Владимировна Косихина; born 7 August 1972) is a Russian politician serving as a senator from Yaroslavl Oblast since 25 September 2018.

== Biography ==
Natalia Kosykhina was born on 7 August 1972 in Danilov, Yaroslavl Oblast. In 1991, she graduated from the Yaroslavl Pedagogical College. In 2001, she also received a degree from the International University of Business and New Technologies in Yaroslavl. At the beginning of the 1990s, she worked as a high school teacher in Danilov. In August 1995, she started working in the administration of the Danilov region. From 2006 to 2012, Kosykhina was the head of the department for organizational work and municipal service, and later, as the first deputy head of the Danilov administration. From 2014 to 2018, she was the head of Danilov. On 9 September 2018, she became the deputy of the Yaroslavl Oblast Duma of the 7th convocation. On 25 September 2018, she became a senator from Yaroslavl Oblast.

In 2024, Kosikhina called for a ban on public celebrations of Halloween in educational institutions in Russia, describing the event as a "Western" cultural import.

=== Sanctions ===
Natalia Kosykhina is under personal sanctions introduced by the European Union, the United Kingdom, the United States, Canada, Switzerland, Australia, Ukraine and New Zealand, for ratifying the decisions of the "Treaty of Friendship, Cooperation and Mutual Assistance between the Russian Federation and the Donetsk People's Republic and between the Russian Federation and the Luhansk People's Republic" and providing political and economic support for Russia's annexation of Ukrainian territories.
