= Anatoly Lisitsyn =

Russian politician (born 1947)

Anatoly Lisitsyn MP
- Анатолий Лисицын
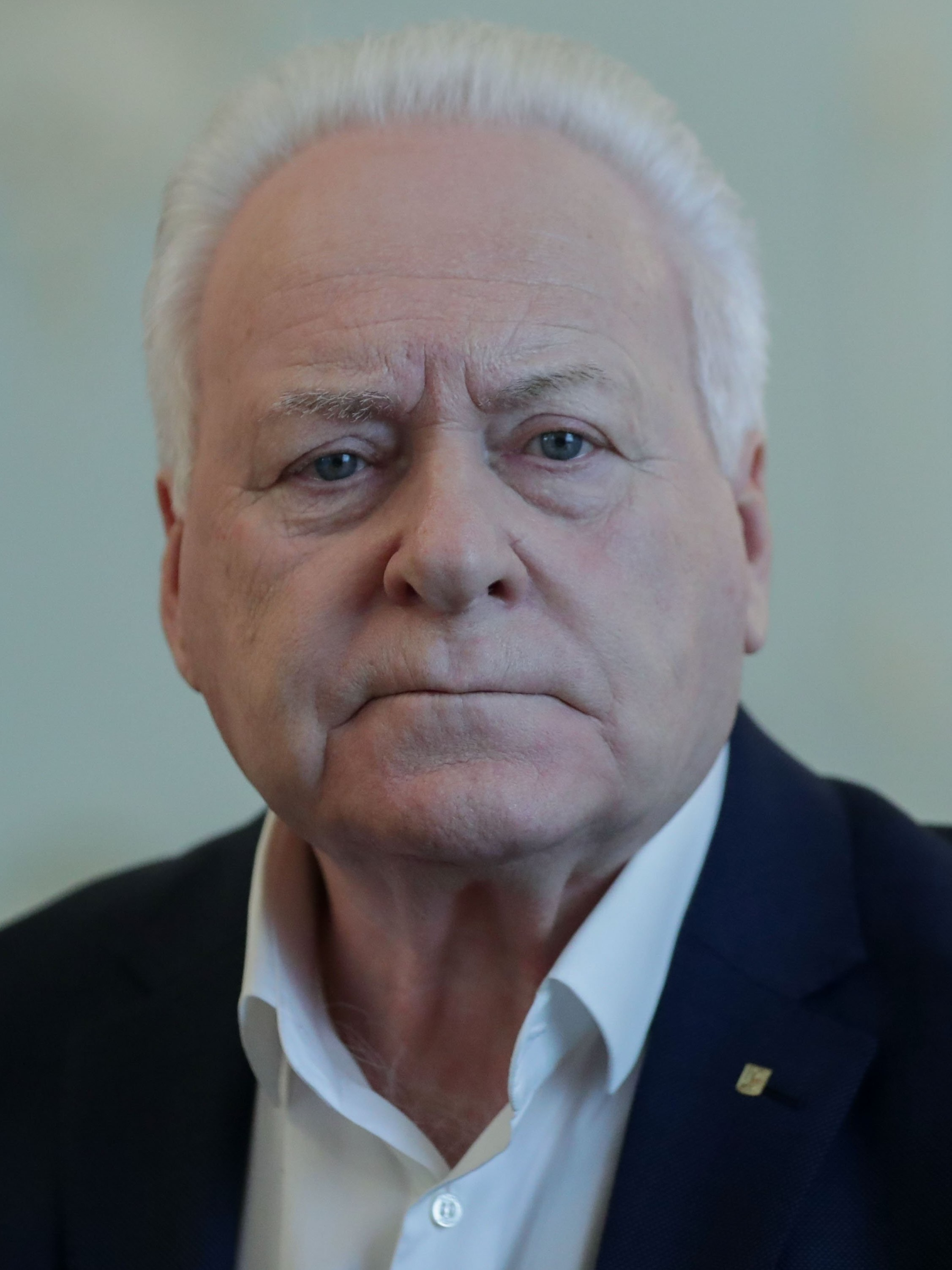
- Lisitsyn in 2021

Member of the State Duma for Yaroslavl Oblast
- Incumbent
- Assumed office 12 October 2021
- Preceded by: Andrei Kovalenko
- Constituency: (No. 194)

Russian Federation Senator from Yaroslavl Oblast
- In office 22 November 2011 – 25 September 2018
- Preceded by: Nikolay Tonkov
- Succeeded by: Natalia Kosikhina

Member of the State Duma (Party List Seat)
- In office 24 December 2007 – 21 December 2011

1st Governor of Yaroslavl Oblast
- In office 10 September 1992 – 13 December 2007
- Preceded by: office established
- Succeeded by: Sergey Vakhrukov

Personal details
- Born: June 26, 1947 (age 79) Bolshiye Smenki, Sonkovsky District, Kalinin Oblast, RSFSR, Soviet Union
- Party: A Just Russia — For Truth (from 2020)
- Other political affiliations: United Russia (2003–20); NDR (1995–98); CPSU (until 1991)
- Spouse: Raisa Lisitsyna (m. 1971)
- Children: daughter Olga
- Education: Leningrad Forestry Academy
- Awards: Alt text Order of the Badge of Honour

Military service
- Allegiance: Soviet Union
- Branch/service: Air Forces
- Years of service: 1965–1966
- Rank: Sergeant

Anatoly Ivanovich Lisitsyn (Russian: Анатолий Иванович Лисицын, born June 26, 1947) is a Russian politician, who was the first governor of Yaroslavl Oblast.

== Early life ==
Anatoly Lisitsyn was born on 26 June 1947 in Bolshiye Smenki, Sonkovsky District of modern Tver Oblast. In 1963 he got a job in "Svoboda" furniture factory, Rybinsk. In 1965–66 he served in the Soviet Air Forces under the Group of Soviet Forces in Germany. He graduated from the Leningrad Forestry Academy in 1977, becoming director of "Svoboda" five years later.

== Political career ==
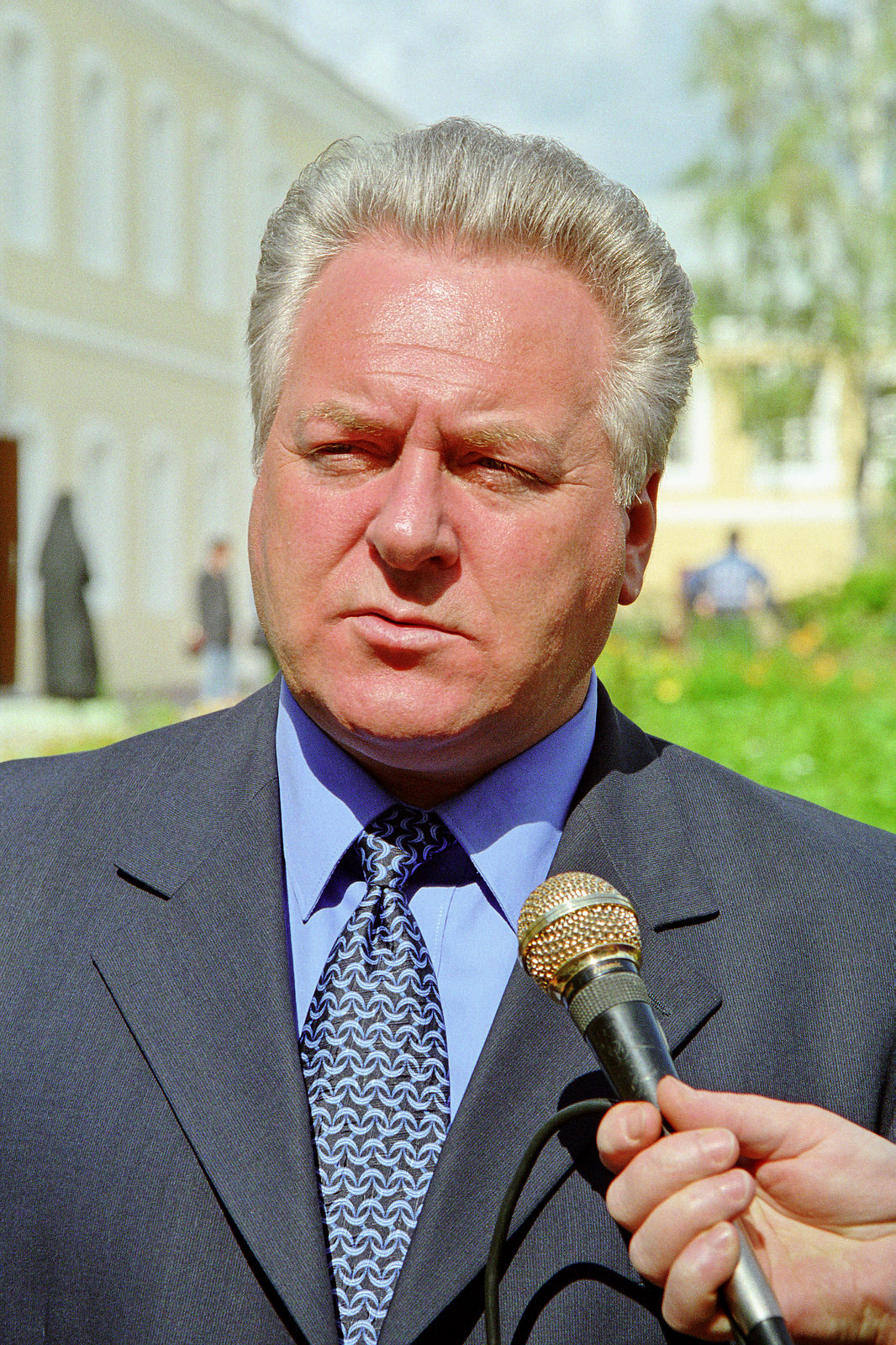
Lisitsyn in 1999

In 1987 Lisitsyn was elected chairman of the executive committee of the Rybinsk's Central District. He became mayor in Rybinsk in 1990. Lisitsyn was nominated for the post of chairman of the Yaroslavl Oblast executive committee, but lost the vote in parliament to Vladimir Kovalyov.

=== Governorship ===
He was appointed acting Head of Administration of Yaroslavl Oblast on 3 December 1991, officially taking office in September next year. During the 1993 Russian constitutional crisis his behavior was described as "careful". In December 1993 Lisitsyn was elected member of the first Federation Council with the support from Gaidar's Choice of Russia bloc. Since 1995, a member of "Our Home – Russia" party and of its council. In 1993, Lisitsyn signed an agreement on trade and economic cooperation with the unrecognized Pridnestrovian Moldavian Republic. Since 1994 he was the President of the Association of Central Russian regions.

He was elected governor on December 17, 1995, with 51.5% of the vote, defeating Communist Vladimir Kornilov. From 1996 to 2001, Lisitsyn (as well as other Russian governors) was an ex officio member of the second Federation Council and was a member of its Committee on Foreign Affairs. On 1 October 1998 he left the "Our Home – Russia". A month later, Lisitsyn became a member of the preparational committee of Yury Luzhkov's Fatherland movement, and later of the political council of the Fatherland-All Russia bloc. Lisitsyn supported the idea of nominating prime minister Vladimir Putin as a single candidate for the presidency in 2000 from Fatherland – All Russia and Unity.

Anatoly Lisitsyn was re-elected on December 19, 1999, with 63.8% of the vote; and again on December 7, 2003, with 73.1% of the vote. He was a member of the State Council, and in 2001 was the inaugural recipient of the Russian National Olymp "Governor of the Year" award.

On 1 June 2004, at a meeting of the State Council, Lisitsyn expressed dissatisfaction with the fact that funds from the road tax began to be transferred to the federal budget, but not the regional one; Russian president Putin replied that the regions were provided with other means of income, but the Yaroslavl authorities "decided to spend this money not on roads, but on something else." This incident was followed by an audit performed by Accounts Chamber of Russia, which found that the budget lost 1.5 billion rubles as a result of the law "On stimulating the economic development", adopted by the local Duma in April 2001 and signed by governor Lisitsyn, which allowed local businesses to receive subsidies from the regional budget and tax exemption.

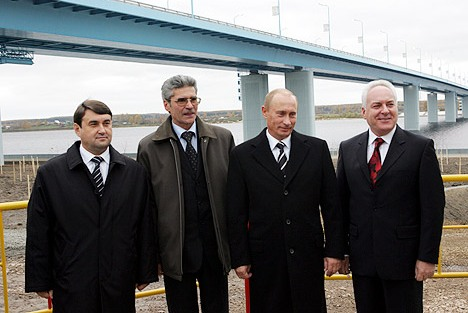
L-R: Igor Levitin, Sergey Galkin, Vladimir Putin and Lisitsyn on the opening of Jubilee Bridge across Volga

On 20 August 2004, the Prosecutor General's Office opened a criminal case under article 286, part 3 of the Criminal Code of Russia "abuse of office by a person holding the office of the head of a region with causing grave consequences." Lisitsyn was placed under recognizance not to leave. He denied guilt and described the June audits as an element of political persecution. In April 2005, the Prosecutor General's Office terminated the criminal prosecution of Lisitsyn due to the expiration of the statute of limitations for criminal prosecution. At the same time, it was found by the investigators that his policy caused damage to the regional budget in the amount of more than 1 billion rubles.

Lisitsyn's fourth term was to expire in December 2007, but in October 2006 he announced his early resignation. On October 13, during president Putin's working visit of to Yaroslavl, Lisitsyn submitted a letter of resignation to the President, planning to take the same position again, but by a vote in Yarslavl Oblast Duma, as it was established since 2004 changes in the legislation. On 2 November 2006 42 out of 45 deputies present at the meeting supported his appointment for a new term.

=== Member of parliament ===
On 2 December 2007, elections to the 5th State Duma of Russia took place. After summing up the results, Lisitsyn, as the head of the regional party list, hesitated for some time, accepted the mandate of a State Duma deputy. On 13 December he announced his resignation as governor of Yaroslavl Oblast. Lisitsyn became a member of Duma's committee on transport.

On 22 November 2011, the Yaroslavl Oblast Duma adopted a resolution appointing Lisitsyn as its representative in the Federation Council of Russia. In September 2018, due to the expiration of the powers of the 6th Yaroslavl Regional Duma, his powers as a senator also expired.

In January 2019, he was expelled from the presidium of the political council of the Yaroslavl branch of the United Russia party. The former governor did not agree with the renewal of the party leadership, but noted that he did not plan to stand up in opposition to the "president’s party" or leave it. However, in March 2020, he left United Russia, explaining his decision by the fact that party membership "does not allow him to work for the people of the region."

In June 2020 Lisitsyn joined A Just Russia party. In the same month, he was nominated from this party as a candidate for the by-election to the State Duma in Yaroslavl constituency No. 194. Lisitsyn lost to the United Russia candidate, former ice hockey player Andrei Kovalenko. A year later, in the election to the 8th State Duma, Lisitsyn won the constituency with 36.5% of the vote, while Kovalenko received 27.3%.

== International sanctions ==
Anatoly Lisitsyn is subject to sanctions imposed by the European Union, the United Kingdom, the United States, Canada, Switzerland, Australia, Japan, Ukraine, and New Zealand.

== Personal life ==
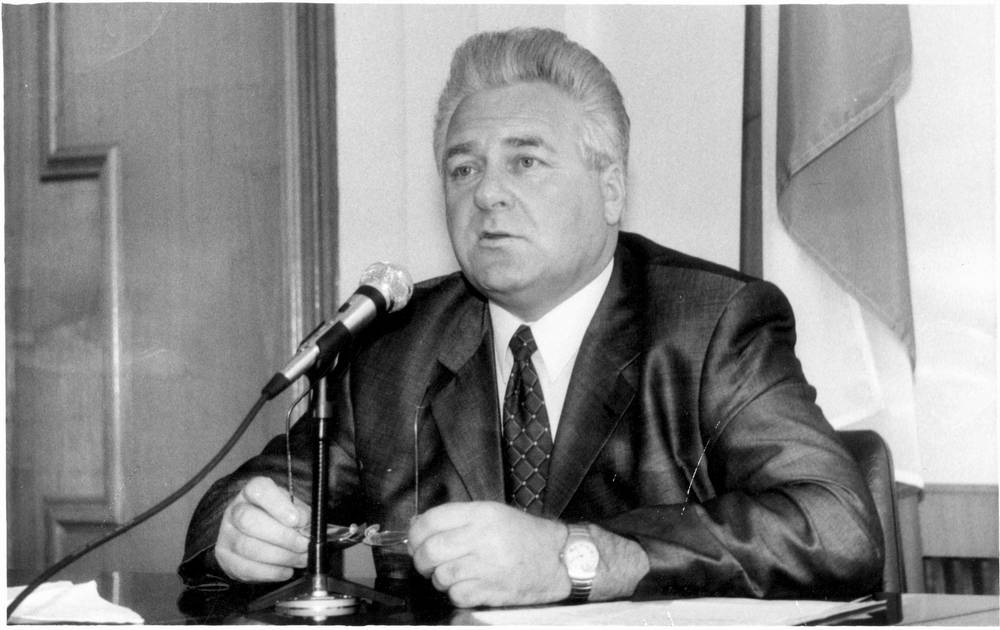
Yaroslavl Governor Anatoly Lisitsyn, 1999

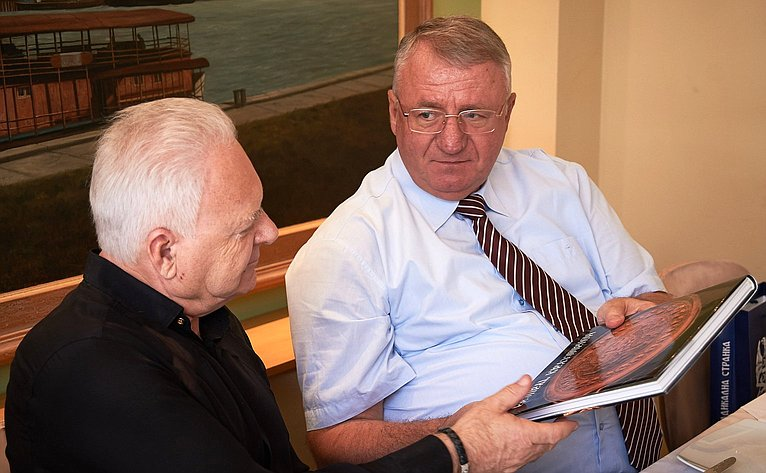
Lisitsyn and Vojislav Šešelj, 2016

In 1971 Anatoly Lisitsyn married his colleague Raisa. They have one daughter, named Olga.

Lisitsyn is known as an inveterate hunter, spending ten days a year on mountain hunting in Kyrgyzstan on a hunt for argali, an animal included in the Red Book of Russia. Among Lisitsyn's trophies is the head of the largest subspecies of argali, the Marco Polo sheep.

== Honours and awards ==
- Order of the Badge of Honour
- Order of Merit for the Fatherland, 3rd class (2 February 2004) - for outstanding contribution to strengthening Russian statehood and many years of diligent work
- Order of Honour (2 December 2000) - for outstanding contribution to the socio-economic development of the field and years of diligent work
- Order of Friendship (2 May 1996) - for services to the state and many years of conscientious work
- Order of Honour (Belarus) (2002)
- Order of Holy Prince Daniel of Moscow, 2nd class (Russian Orthodox Church)
- Order of Saint Blessed Prince Dimitry (Russian Orthodox Church)
- Order of St. Sergius, 1st and 2nd classes (Russian Orthodox Church)
- Honorary Citizen of Rybinsk (2002) and Yaroslavl (2006)
- First winner of the "Russian National Olympus" as "Governor of the Year" (2001)
- Order of St. Sergius of Radonezh, 1st class (2015)
- Order of Saint Blessed Prince Daniel of Moscow, 2nd class
