= Krasnodubrovsky, Zavyalovsky District, Altai Krai =

Krasnodubrovsky Краснодубровский
- Settlement
- Location within Altai Krai Location within Russia
- Coordinates: 52°55′N 80°47′E
- Country: Russia
- Region: Altai Krai
- District: Zavyalovsky District
- Time zone: UTC+7:00

Krasnodubrovsky (Russian: Краснодубровский) is a rural locality (a settlement) in Zavyalovsky Selsoviet, Zavyalovsky District, Altai Krai, Russia. The population was 203 as of 2013. There are 6 streets.

== Geography ==
Krasnodubrovsky is located 14 km northwest of Zavyalovo (the district's administrative centre) by road. Malinovsky is the nearest rural locality.
