= Danilov, Yaroslavl Oblast =

Town in Yaroslavl Oblast, Russia

Danilov Данилов
- Town
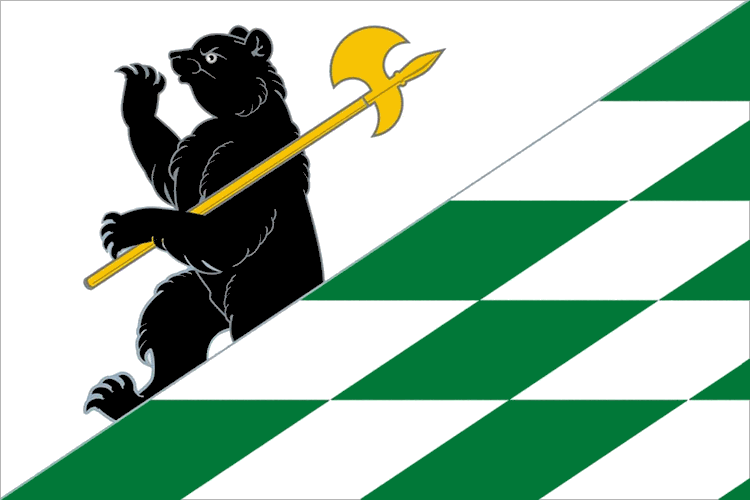
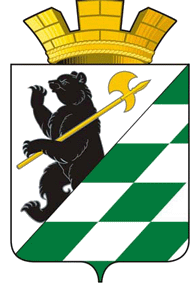
- Flag Coat of arms
- Interactive map of Danilov
- Location of Danilov Danilov (Yaroslavl Oblast)
- Coordinates: 58°11′N 40°10′E
- Country: Russia
- Federal subject: Yaroslavl Oblast
- Administrative district: Danilovsky District
- Town of district significanceSelsoviet: Danilov
- First mentioned: 1592
- Town status since: 1777
- Elevation: 160 m (520 ft)

Population (2010 Census)
  - Total: 15,861
  - Estimate (1 October 2021): 13,677 (−13.8%)

Administrative status
  - Capital of: town of district significance of Danilov

Municipal status
  - Municipal district: Danilovsky Municipal District
  - Urban settlement: Danilov Urban Settlement
  - Capital of: Danilovsky Municipal District, Danilov Urban Settlement
- Time zone: UTC+3 (MSK)
- Postal codes: 152070–152072, 152099
- OKTMO ID: 78615101001
- Website: danilovgp.ru

Danilov (Russian: Дани́лов) is a town and the administrative center of Danilovsky District in Yaroslavl Oblast, Russia. Population: 15,861 (2010 census); 17,245 (2002 census); 18,857 (1989 Soviet census).

== History ==
Danilov was first mentioned in a chronicle in 1592 and was granted town status in 1777.

== Administrative and municipal status ==
Within the framework of administrative divisions, Danilov serves as the administrative center of Danilovsky District. As an administrative division, it is incorporated within Danilovsky District as the town of district significance of Danilov. As a municipal division, the town of district significance of Danilov is incorporated within Danilovsky Municipal District as Danilov Urban Settlement.

== Economy ==
There is a cheese producing plant and some other industries.

=== Transportation ===
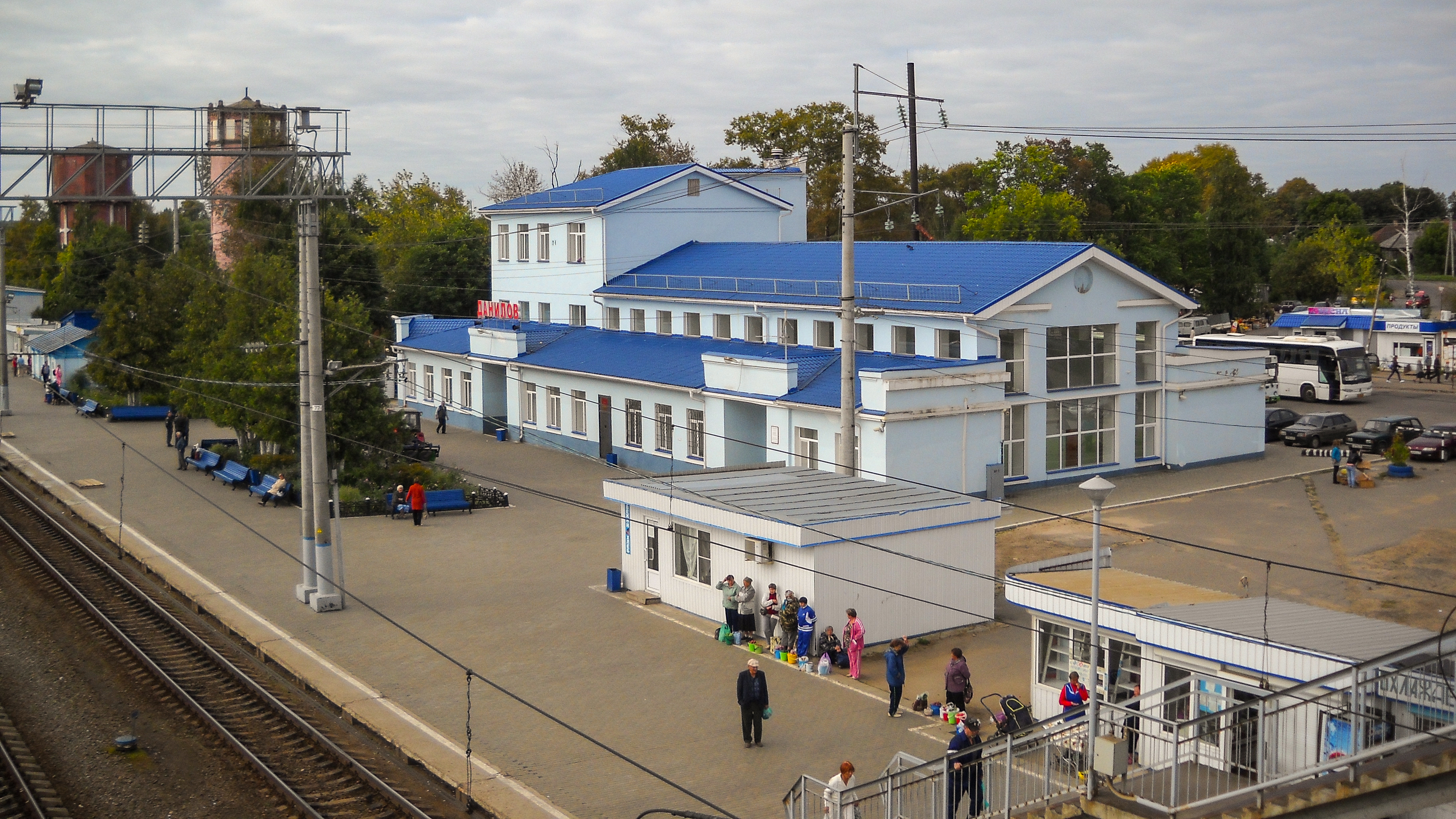
Danilov railway station in Danilov

The town stands on the M8 Highway. There is also a major railway station where locomotives are switched from electrification system DC 3 kV to AC 25 kV and vice versa. Railway lines go to Yaroslavl, Vologda, and Buy.
