= Danilovsky District, Yaroslavl Oblast =

Danilovsky District Даниловский район (Russian)
- District
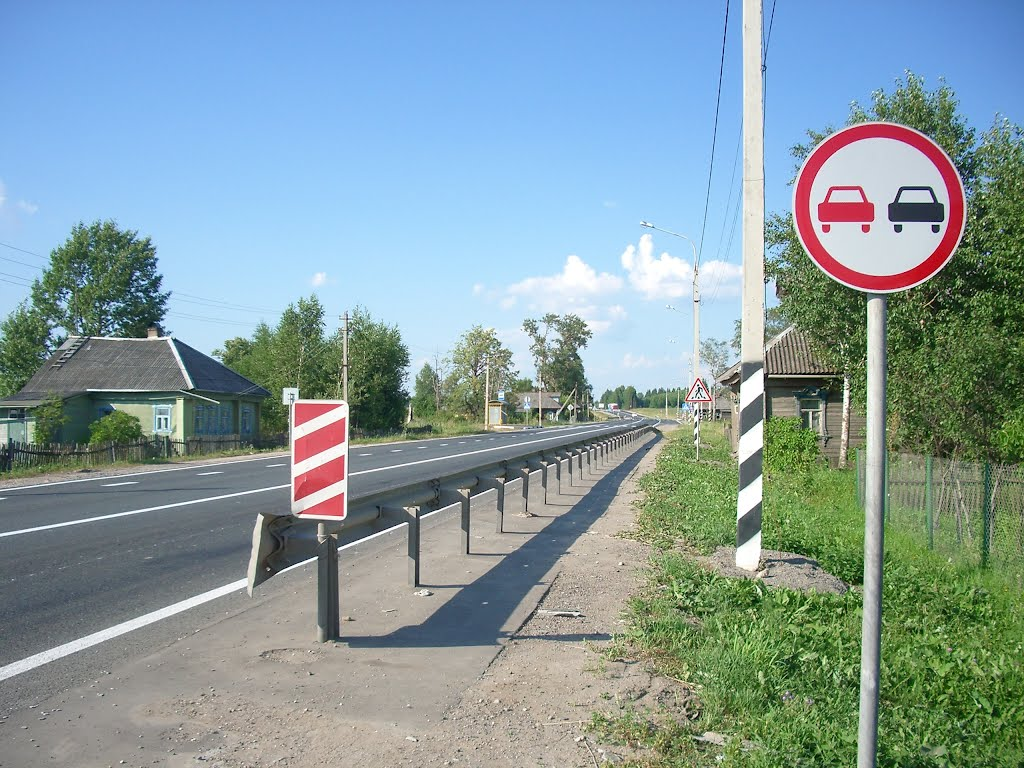
- Street scene, Danilovsky District

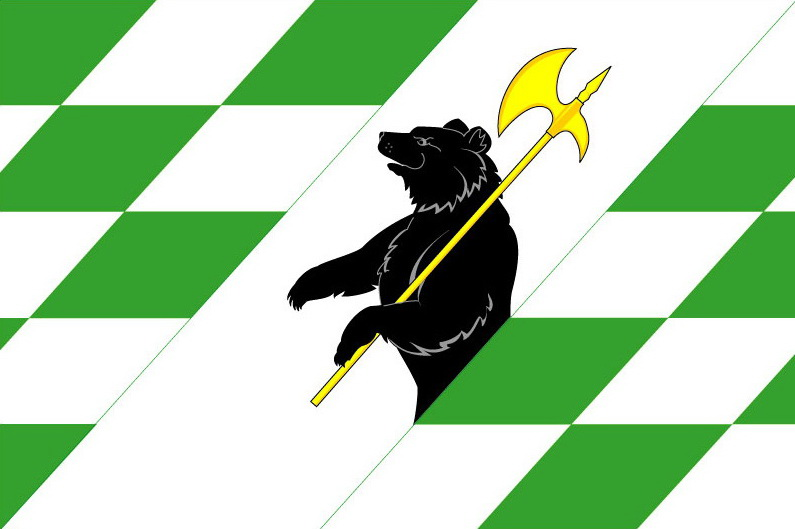
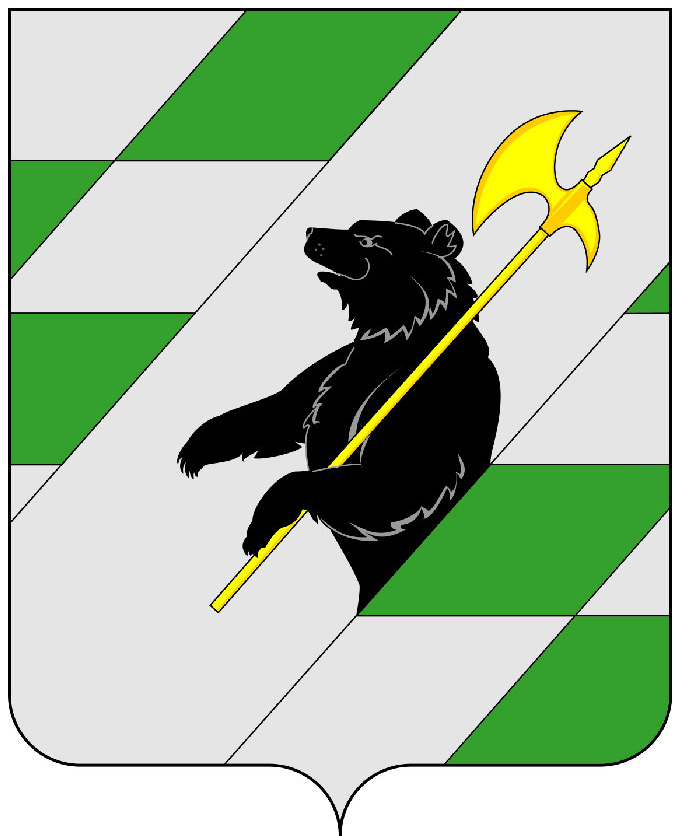
- Flag Coat of arms
- Location of Danilovsky District in Yaroslavl Oblast
- Coordinates: 58°11′N 40°10′E
- Country: Russia
- Federal subject: Yaroslavl Oblast
- Established: 1929
- Administrative center: Danilov

Area
  - Total: 2,230 km^{2} (860 sq mi)

Population (2010 Census)
  - Total: 26,072
  - Estimate (2018): 24,678 (−5.3%)
  - Density: 11.7/km^{2} (30.3/sq mi)
  - Urban: 60.8%
  - Rural: 39.2%

Administrative structure
  - Administrative divisions: 1 Towns of district significance, 19 Rural okrugs
  - Inhabited localities: 1 cities/towns, 562 rural localities

Municipal structure
  - Municipally incorporated as: Danilovsky Municipal District
  - Municipal divisions: 1 urban settlements, 3 rural settlements
- Time zone: UTC+3 (MSK)
- OKTMO ID: 78615000
- Website: http://www.danilovmr.ru/

Danilovsky District (Russian: Дани́ловский райо́н) is an administrative and municipal district (raion), one of the seventeen in Yaroslavl Oblast, Russia. It is located in the northeast of the oblast. The area of the district is 2,230 square kilometers (860 sq mi). Its administrative center is the town of Danilov. Population: 26,072 (2010 Census); 29,594 (2002 census); 34,327 (1989 Soviet census). The population of Danilov accounts for 60.8% of the district's total population.
