= Administrative divisions of the Mari El Republic =

Administrative districts of Russian federal subject

Mari El Republic Russia
- Capital: Yoshkar-Ola

Administrative structure (as of 2015)
- Districts: 14
- Cities/towns: 4
- Urban-type settlements: 15
- Selsovets: 120

Municipal structure (as of 2002)
- Rural settlements: 1,612 (inhabited); 53 (uninhabited)

The Mari El Republic is a federal subject of Russia.

== Administrative and municipal divisions ==
Map

Division	Structure		OKATO	OKTMO	Urban-type settlement/ district-level town*	Rural (rural okrug)
Division	Administrative	Municipal	OKATO	OKTMO	Urban-type settlement/ district-level town*	Rural (rural okrug)
Yoshkar-Ola (Йошкар-Ола)	city	urban okrug	88 401	88 701		
Volzhsk (Волжск)	city	urban okrug	88 405	88 705		
Kozmodemyansk (Козьмодемьянск)	city	urban okrug	88 415	88 715		
Volzhsky (Волжский)	district		88 204	88 604	Privolzhsky (Приволжский)	7
Gornomariysky (Горномарийский)	district		88 208	88 608		10
Zvenigovsky (Звениговский)	district		88 212	88 612	Zvenigovo (Звенигово) town*; Krasnogorsky (Красногорский); Suslonger (Суслонгер)	7
Kilemarsky (Килемарский)	district		88 216	88 616	Kilemary (Килемары)	8
Kuzhenersky (Куженерский)	district		88 220	88 620	Kuzhener (Куженер)	8
Mari-Tureksky (Мари-Турекский)	district		88 224	88 624	Mari-Turek (Мари-Турек)	5
Medvedevsky (Медведевский)	district		88 228	88 628	Krasnooktyabrsky (Краснооктябрьский); Medvedevo (Медведево)	19
Morkinsky (Моркинский)	district		88 232	88 632	Morki (Морки)	9
Novotoryalsky (Новоторъяльский)	district		88 236	88 636	Novy Toryal (Новый Торъял)	4
Orshansky (Оршанский)	district		88 240	88 640	Orshanka (Оршанка)	12
Paranginsky (Параньгинский)	district		88 244	88 644	Paranga (Параньга)	8
Sernursky (Сернурский)	district		88 248	88 648	Sernur (Сернур)	8
Sovetsky (Советский)	district		88 252	88 652	Sovetsky (Советский)	7
Yurinsky (Юринский)	district		88 256	88 656	Yurino (Юрино)	8
