= Podgorny, Russia =

Podgorny (Russian: Подго́рный; masculine), Podgornaya (Подго́рная; feminine), or Podgornoye (Подго́рное; neuter) is the name of several rural localities in Russia.

== Republic of Adygea ==
As of 2010, two rural localities in the Republic of Adygea bear this name:

- Podgorny, Maykop, Republic of Adygea, a settlement under the administrative jurisdiction of the Maykop Republican Urban Okrug
- Podgorny, Maykopsky District, Republic of Adygea, a settlement in Maykopsky District

== Altai Krai ==
As of 2010, one rural locality in Altai Krai bears this name:

- Podgorny, Altai Krai, a settlement in Krutishinsky Selsoviet of Shelabolikhinsky District

== Altai Republic ==
As of 2010, one rural locality in the Altai Republic bears this name:

- Podgornoye, Altai Republic, a selo in Mayminskoye Rural Settlement of Mayminsky District

== Amur Oblast ==
As of 2010, one rural locality in Amur Oblast bears this name:

- Podgorny, Amur Oblast, a settlement in Novgorodsky Rural Settlement of Svobodnensky District

== Republic of Bashkortostan ==
As of 2010, two rural localities in the Republic of Bashkortostan bear this name:

- Podgorny, Republic of Bashkortostan, a village in Makarovsky Selsoviet of Ishimbaysky District
- Podgornoye, Republic of Bashkortostan, a selo in Chapayevsky Selsoviet of Kugarchinsky District

== Belgorod Oblast ==
As of 2010, one rural locality in Belgorod Oblast bears this name:

- Podgornoye, Belgorod Oblast, a selo in Podgorensky Rural Okrug of Valuysky District

== Republic of Buryatia ==
As of 2010, one rural locality in the Republic of Buryatia bears this name:

- Podgornoye, Republic of Buryatia, a selo in Topkinsky Selsoviet of Bichursky District

== Chechen Republic ==
As of 2010, one rural locality in the Chechen Republic bears this name:

- Podgornoye, Chechen Republic, a selo in Nadterechny District

== Chelyabinsk Oblast ==
As of 2010, three rural localities in Chelyabinsk Oblast bear this name:

- Podgorny, Nagaybaksky District, Chelyabinsk Oblast, a settlement in Kasselsky Selsoviet of Nagaybaksky District
- Podgorny, Uvelsky District, Chelyabinsk Oblast, a settlement in Kamensky Selsoviet of Uvelsky District
- Podgornoye, Chelyabinsk Oblast, a selo in Kosobrodsky Selsoviet of Troitsky District

== Irkutsk Oblast ==
As of 2010, two rural localities in Irkutsk Oblast bear this name:

- Podgorny, Irkutsk Oblast, a settlement in Nizhneudinsky District
- Podgornaya, Irkutsk Oblast, a village in Ziminsky District

== Kaliningrad Oblast ==
As of 2010, four rural localities in Kaliningrad Oblast bear this name:

- Podgornoye, Bagrationovsky District, Kaliningrad Oblast, a settlement in Dolgorukovsky Rural Okrug of Bagrationovsky District
- Podgornoye, Chernyakhovsky District, Kaliningrad Oblast, a settlement in Svobodnensky Rural Okrug of Chernyakhovsky District
- Podgornoye, Guryevsky District, Kaliningrad Oblast, a settlement in Nizovsky Rural Okrug of Guryevsky District
- Podgornoye, Nemansky District, Kaliningrad Oblast, a settlement under the administrative jurisdiction of Neman Town of District Significance of Nemansky District

== Republic of Karelia ==
As of 2010, one rural locality in the Republic of Karelia bears this name:

- Podgornaya, Republic of Karelia, a village in Kondopozhsky District

== Kemerovo Oblast ==
As of 2010, three rural localities in Kemerovo Oblast bear this name:

- Podgorny, Kemerovo Oblast, a settlement in Bungurskaya Rural Territory of Mezhdurechensky District
- Podgornoye, Kemerovo Oblast, a selo in Podgornovskaya Rural Territory of Leninsk-Kuznetsky District
- Podgornaya, Kemerovo Oblast, a village in Kurtukovskaya Rural Territory of Mezhdurechensky District

== Khabarovsk Krai ==
As of 2010, one rural locality in Khabarovsk Krai bears this name:

- Podgornoye, Khabarovsk Krai, a selo in Nikolayevsky District

== Kirov Oblast ==
As of 2010, five rural localities in Kirov Oblast bear this name:

- Podgorny, Kirov Oblast, a settlement under the administrative jurisdiction of the town of Murashi, Murashinsky District
- Podgornoye, Belokholunitsky District, Kirov Oblast, a village in Gurensky Rural Okrug of Belokholunitsky District
- Podgornoye, Slobodskoy District, Kirov Oblast, a village in Svetozarevsky Rural Okrug of Slobodskoy District
- Podgornaya, Pizhansky District, Kirov Oblast, a village in Izhevsky Rural Okrug of Pizhansky District
- Podgornaya, Sovetsky District, Kirov Oblast, a village in Rodyginsky Rural Okrug of Sovetsky District

== Kostroma Oblast ==
As of 2010, one rural locality in Kostroma Oblast bears this name:

- Podgorny, Kostroma Oblast, a settlement in Dmitriyevskoye Settlement of Galichsky District

== Krasnoyarsk Krai ==
As of 2010, three rural localities in Krasnoyarsk Krai bear this name:

- Podgorny, Zheleznogorsk, Krasnoyarsk Krai, a settlement under the administrative jurisdiction of the closed administrative-territorial formation of Zheleznogorsk
- Podgorny, Kuraginsky District, Krasnoyarsk Krai, a settlement in Roshchinsky Selsoviet of Kuraginsky District
- Podgornoye, Krasnoyarsk Krai, a selo in Podgornovsky Selsoviet of Yeniseysky District

== Kurgan Oblast ==
As of 2010, one rural locality in Kurgan Oblast bears this name:

- Podgornaya, Kurgan Oblast, a village in Berezovsky Selsoviet of Pritobolny District

== Leningrad Oblast ==
As of 2010, one rural locality in Leningrad Oblast bears this name:

- Podgornoye, Leningrad Oblast, a logging depot settlement in Pervomayskoye Settlement Municipal Formation of Vyborgsky District

== Lipetsk Oblast ==
As of 2010, three rural localities in Lipetsk Oblast bear this name:

- Podgornoye, Khlevensky District, Lipetsk Oblast, a village in Sindyakinsky Selsoviet of Khlevensky District
- Podgornoye, Lipetsky District, Lipetsk Oblast, a selo in Syrsky Selsoviet of Lipetsky District
- Podgornaya, Lipetsk Oblast, a village in Georgiyevsky Selsoviet of Stanovlyansky District

== Mari El Republic ==
As of 2010, two rural localities in the Mari El Republic bear this name:

- Podgornoye, Mari El Republic, a village in Maryinsky Rural Okrug of Yurinsky District
- Podgornaya, Mari El Republic, a village under the administrative jurisdiction of the urban-type settlement of Morki, Morkinsky District

== Moscow Oblast ==
As of 2010, one rural locality in Moscow Oblast bears this name:

- Podgornoye, Moscow Oblast, a village in Gabovskoye Rural Settlement of Dmitrovsky District

== Novgorod Oblast ==
As of 2010, two rural localities in Novgorod Oblast bear this name:

- Podgornoye, Novgorod Oblast, a village in Verebyinskoye Settlement of Malovishersky District
- Podgornaya, Novgorod Oblast, a village in Polnovskoye Settlement of Demyansky District

== Novosibirsk Oblast ==
As of 2010, one rural locality in Novosibirsk Oblast bears this name:

- Podgornaya, Novosibirsk Oblast, a village under the administrative jurisdiction of the work settlement of Kolyvan, Kolyvansky District

== Orenburg Oblast ==
As of 2010, four rural localities in Orenburg Oblast bear this name:

- Podgorny, Alexandrovsky District, Orenburg Oblast, a settlement in Alexandrovsky Selsoviet of Alexandrovsky District
- Podgorny, Buzuluksky District, Orenburg Oblast, a settlement in Troitsky Selsoviet of Buzuluksky District
- Podgorny, Sharlyksky District, Orenburg Oblast, a settlement in Sarmanaysky Selsoviet of Sharlyksky District
- Podgornoye, Orenburg Oblast, a selo in Ilyinsky Selsoviet of Kuvandyksky District

== Penza Oblast ==
As of 2010, four rural localities in Penza Oblast bear this name:

- Podgorny, Nizhnelomovsky District, Penza Oblast, a settlement in Golitsynsky Selsoviet of Nizhnelomovsky District
- Podgorny, Pachelmsky District, Penza Oblast, a settlement in Novotolkovsky Selsoviet of Pachelmsky District
- Podgornoye, Bashmakovsky District, Penza Oblast, a selo in Podgornsky Selsoviet of Bashmakovsky District
- Podgornoye, Mokshansky District, Penza Oblast, a selo in Podgornensky Selsoviet of Mokshansky District

== Perm Krai ==
As of 2010, two rural localities in Perm Krai bear this name:

- Podgornaya, Cherdynsky District, Perm Krai, a settlement in Cherdynsky District
- Podgornaya, Ochyorsky District, Perm Krai, a village in Ochyorsky District

== Primorsky Krai ==
As of 2010, one rural locality in Primorsky Krai bears this name:

- Podgornoye, Primorsky Krai, a selo in Kirovsky District

== Rostov Oblast ==
As of 2010, two rural localities in Rostov Oblast bear this name:

- Podgorny, Rostov Oblast, a khutor in Bolshekirsanovskoye Rural Settlement of Matveyevo-Kurgansky District
- Podgornoye, Rostov Oblast, a selo in Podgornenskoye Rural Settlement of Remontnensky District

== Sakhalin Oblast ==
As of 2010, one rural locality in Sakhalin Oblast bears this name:

- Podgornoye, Sakhalin Oblast, a selo in Tymovsky District

== Samara Oblast ==
As of 2010, two rural localities in Samara Oblast bear this name:

- Podgorny, Samara Oblast, a settlement in Kinel-Cherkassky District
- Podgornoye, Samara Oblast, a selo in Borsky District

== Saratov Oblast ==
As of 2010, four rural localities in Saratov Oblast bear this name:

- Podgornoye, Arkadaksky District, Saratov Oblast, a selo in Arkadaksky District
- Podgornoye, Engelssky District, Saratov Oblast, a selo in Engelssky District
- Podgornoye, Romanovsky District, Saratov Oblast, a selo in Romanovsky District
- Podgornoye, Voskresensky District, Saratov Oblast, a selo in Voskresensky District

== Smolensk Oblast ==
As of 2010, one rural locality in Smolensk Oblast bears this name:

- Podgornoye, Smolensk Oblast, a village under the administrative jurisdiction of Yelninskoye Urban Settlement of Yelninsky District

== Stavropol Krai ==
As of 2010, three rural localities in Stavropol Krai bear this name:

- Podgorny, Stavropol Krai, a khutor under the administrative jurisdiction of the town of Mikhaylovsk, Shpakovsky District
- Podgornoye, Stavropol Krai, a selo in Kazinsky Selsoviet of Andropovsky District
- Podgornaya, Stavropol Krai, a stanitsa in Podgornaya Selsoviet of Georgiyevsky District

== Tambov Oblast ==
As of 2010, three rural localities in Tambov Oblast bear this name:

- Podgorny, Tambov Oblast, a settlement in Kaluginsky Selsoviet of Inzhavinsky District
- Podgornoye, Staroyuryevsky District, Tambov Oblast, a selo in Podgornensky Selsoviet of Staroyuryevsky District
- Podgornoye, Uvarovsky District, Tambov Oblast, a selo in Podgornensky Selsoviet of Uvarovsky District

== Republic of Tatarstan ==
As of 2010, two rural localities in the Republic of Tatarstan bear this name:

- Podgorny, Bugulminsky District, Republic of Tatarstan, a settlement in Bugulminsky District
- Podgorny, Yutazinsky District, Republic of Tatarstan, a settlement in Yutazinsky District

== Tomsk Oblast ==
As of 2010, one rural locality in Tomsk Oblast bears this name:

- Podgornoye, Tomsk Oblast, a selo in Chainsky District

== Udmurt Republic ==
As of 2010, three rural localities in the Udmurt Republic bear this name:

- Podgorny, Udmurt Republic, a village in Bolshekivarsky Selsoviet of Votkinsky District
- Podgornoye, Udmurt Republic, a selo in Podgornovsky Selsoviet of Kiyasovsky District
- Podgornaya, Udmurt Republic, a village in Melnikovsky Selsoviet of Mozhginsky District

== Ulyanovsk Oblast ==
As of 2010, one rural locality in Ulyanovsk Oblast bears this name:

- Podgorny, Ulyanovsk Oblast, a settlement in Oskinsky Rural Okrug of Inzensky District

== Volgograd Oblast ==
As of 2010, one rural locality in Volgograd Oblast bears this name:

- Podgorny, Volgograd Oblast, a khutor in Tryasinovsky Selsoviet of Serafimovichsky District

== Vologda Oblast ==
As of 2010, ten rural localities in Vologda Oblast bear this name:

- Podgorny, Vologda Oblast, a settlement in Churovsky Selsoviet of Sheksninsky District
- Podgornaya, Demyanovsky Selsoviet, Babushkinsky District, Vologda Oblast, a village in Demyanovsky Selsoviet of Babushkinsky District
- Podgornaya, Timanovsky Selsoviet, Babushkinsky District, Vologda Oblast, a village in Timanovsky Selsoviet of Babushkinsky District
- Podgornaya, Kirillovsky District, Vologda Oblast, a village in Volokoslavinsky Selsoviet of Kirillovsky District
- Podgornaya, Korobitsinsky Selsoviet, Syamzhensky District, Vologda Oblast, a village in Korobitsinsky Selsoviet of Syamzhensky District
- Podgornaya, Zhityevsky Selsoviet, Syamzhensky District, Vologda Oblast, a village in Zhityevsky Selsoviet of Syamzhensky District
- Podgornaya, Shebengsky Selsoviet, Tarnogsky District, Vologda Oblast, a village in Shebengsky Selsoviet of Tarnogsky District
- Podgornaya, Shevdenitsky Selsoviet, Tarnogsky District, Vologda Oblast, a village in Shevdenitsky Selsoviet of Tarnogsky District
- Podgornaya, Totemsky District, Vologda Oblast, a village in Pogorelovsky Selsoviet of Totemsky District
- Podgornaya, Vashkinsky District, Vologda Oblast, a village in Porechensky Selsoviet of Vashkinsky District

== Voronezh Oblast ==
As of 2010, five rural localities in Voronezh Oblast bear this name:

- Podgornoye, Voronezh, Voronezh Oblast, a selo under the administrative jurisdiction of Voronezh Urban Okrug
- Podgornoye, Kalacheyevsky District, Voronezh Oblast, a selo in Podgorenskoye Rural Settlement of Kalacheyevsky District
- Podgornoye, Novokhopyorsky District, Voronezh Oblast, a selo in Podgorenskoye Rural Settlement of Novokhopyorsky District
- Podgornoye, Podgorensky District, Voronezh Oblast, a sloboda under the administrative jurisdiction of Podgorenskoye Urban Settlement of Podgorensky District
- Podgornoye, Rossoshansky District, Voronezh Oblast, a selo in Podgorenskoye Rural Settlement of Rossoshansky District
