= Kazan metropolitan area =

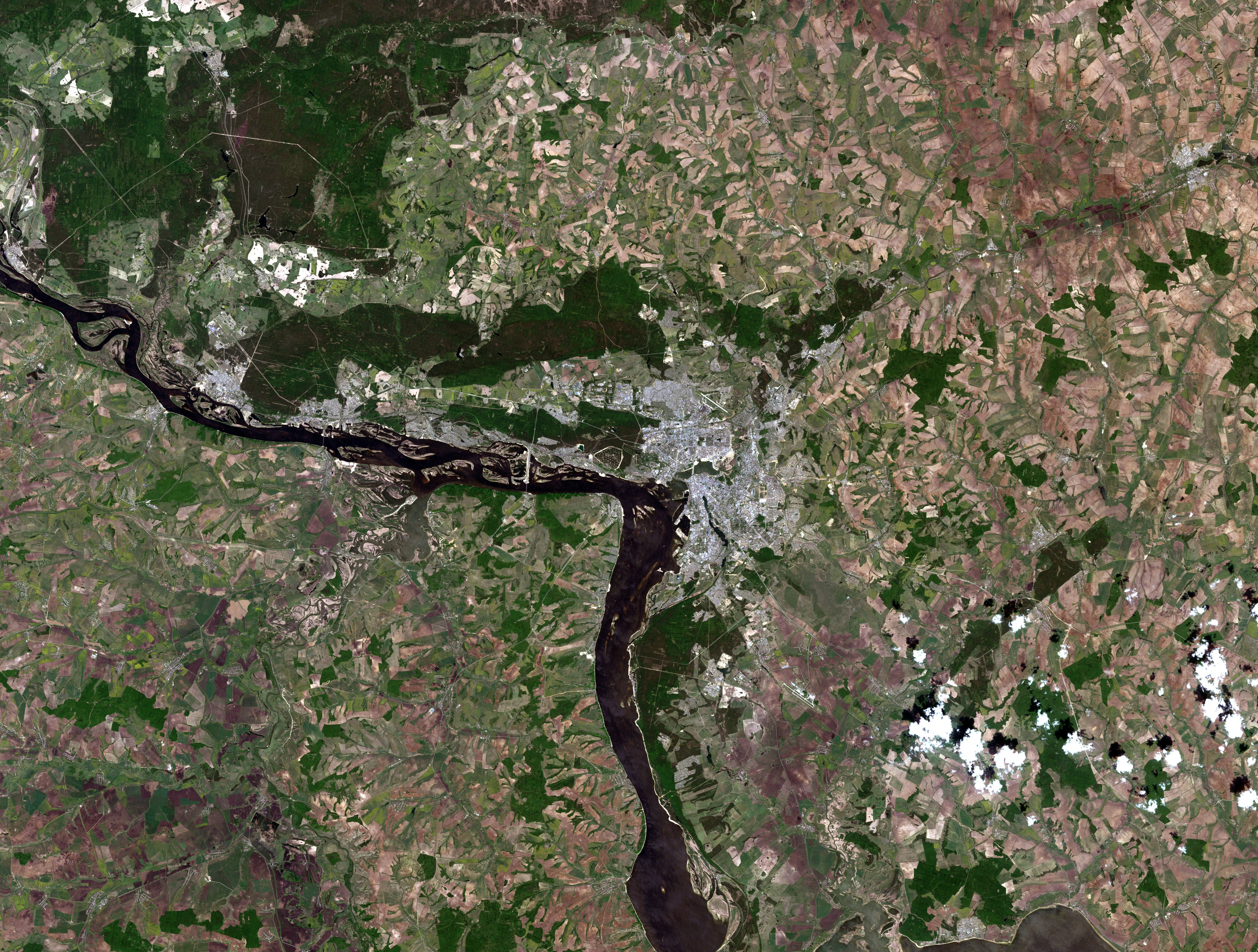
- Interactive map of Kazan metropolitan area
- Coordinates: 55°47′N 49°10′E
- Country: Russia
- Major Cities: Kazan; Zelenodolsk; Volzhsk; Zvenigovo

Area
  - Metro: 1,000 km^{2} (390 sq mi)

Population
  - Metro: 1,570,000
  - Metro density: 1,600/km^{2} (4,100/sq mi)

Kazan metropolitan area is one of the largest metropolitan areas located in Russia which metropole includes the cities and districts of Tatarstan and Mari El republics:

- Cities: Kazan, Zelenodolsk, Volzhsk;
- Districts (rayons) of Tatarstan: Atninsky, Verkhneuslonsky, Vysokogorsky, Zelenodolsky, Laishevsky, Pestrechinsky;
- Districts (rayons) of Mari El: Volzhsky, Zvenigovsky.
