= List of localities in Russia named Orshanka =

Orshanka (Russian: Оршанка) is the name of two inhabited localities in the Mari El Republic of Russia:

- Orshanka, Orshansky District, Mari El Republic, an urban locality (an urban-type settlement) in Orshansky District
- Orshanka, Sovetsky District, Mari El Republic, a rural locality (a village) in Sovetsky District
