= Yurinsky =

Yurinsky (masculine), Yurinskaya (feminine), or Yurinskoye (neuter) may refer to:

- Yurinsky District, a district of the Mari El Republic, Russia
- Yurinsky (rural locality) (Yurinskaya, Yurinskoye), name of several rural localities in Russia
