= Alexeyevsk =

Alexeyevsk (Russian: Алексеевск) is the name of several inhabited localities in Russia.

== Modern localities ==
Urban localities

- Alexeyevsk, Irkutsk Oblast, a work settlement in Kirensky District of Irkutsk Oblast

Rural localities

- Alexeyevsk, Bryansk Oblast, a selo in Domanichsky Rural Administrative Okrug of Pochepsky District in Bryansk Oblast; 53°2′N 33°21′E

== Historical names ==
- Alexeyevsk, name of Svobodny, a town in Amur Oblast, in 1912–1917

== Alternative names ==
- Alexeyevsk, alternative name of Alexeyevskoye, a selo under the administrative jurisdiction of Mari-Turek Urban-Type Settlement in Mari-Tureksky District of the Mari El Republic; 56°43′N 49°44′E

== See also ==
- Alexey
- Alexeyevsky (disambiguation)
