= Kuzhener =

Kuzhener (Russian: Куженер) is the name of several inhabited localities in Russia:

- Kuzhener, Mari El Republic, an urban locality (an urban-type settlement) in Kuzhenersky District of the Mari El Republic; 56°49′N 48°54′E
- Kuzhener, Nizhny Novgorod Oblast, a rural locality (a village) under the administrative jurisdiction of Tonshayevo Work Settlement in Tonshayevsky District of Nizhny Novgorod Oblast; 57°44′N 46°55′E
