= Kosolapovo =

Village in Mari El, Russia

Kosolapovo Косолапово
- Village
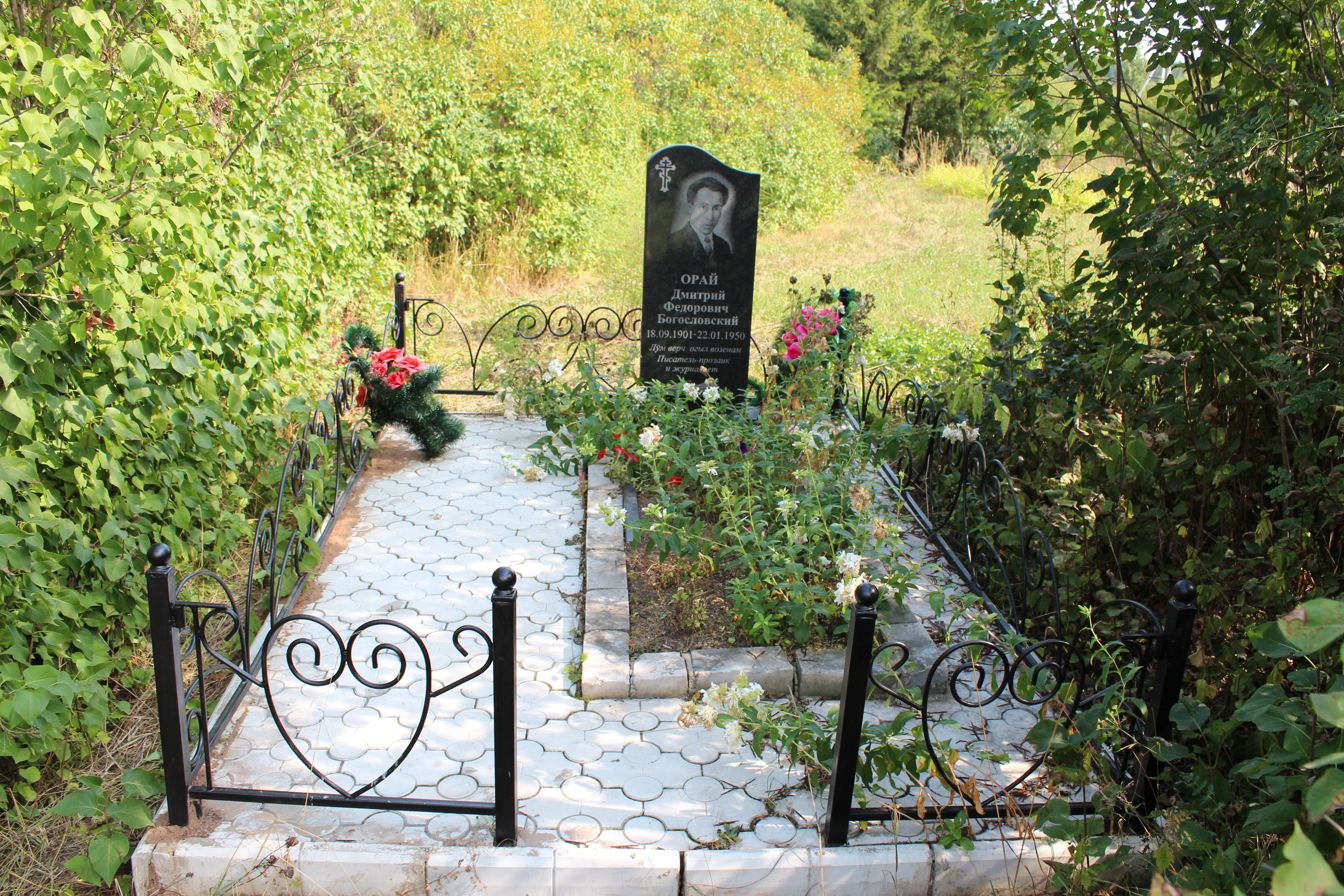
- A monument of a journalist in Kosolapovo.

- Location within Mari El Location within Russia
- Coordinates: 56°55′46″N 49°36′6″E
- Country: Russia
- Republic: Mari El
- District: Mari-Tureksky

Area
  - Total: 1.62 km^{2} (0.63 sq mi)
- Elevation: 135 m (443 ft)

Population (2015)
  - Total: 1,147
  - Density: 708/km^{2} (1,830/sq mi)
- Time zone: UTC+3 (MSK)
- Postal code: 425531

Kosolapovo (Russian: Косолапово) is a village in Mari-Tureksky District, Mari El Republic, Russia. The village is the center of the Kosolapovsky rural settlement, which oversees 21 other smaller villages.

== Climate and geography ==
=== Climate ===
The climate is characterized as moderately continental, with moderately cold snowy winters and relatively warm summers. The average annual air temperature is 2.2 °C. The average air temperature of the warmest month (July) is 18.5 °C (absolute maximum is 38 °C); the coldest (January) is -14 °C (absolute minimum is -48 °C). The duration of periods with stable frosts is on average 127 days. The average annual amount of precipitation is 496 mm, of which about 70% falls in the warm period.

=== Geography ===
The village is located in the eastern part of the republic, in a zone of coniferous-deciduous forests, within the Mari-Turek plateau.

In recent history, Kosalapovo's population has fluctuated, from 1,616 in 2000 (in 565 families) to 1,526 in 2002 to 1,560 in 2010. In terms of public transit, the village is connected to the rest of Russia by bus service.

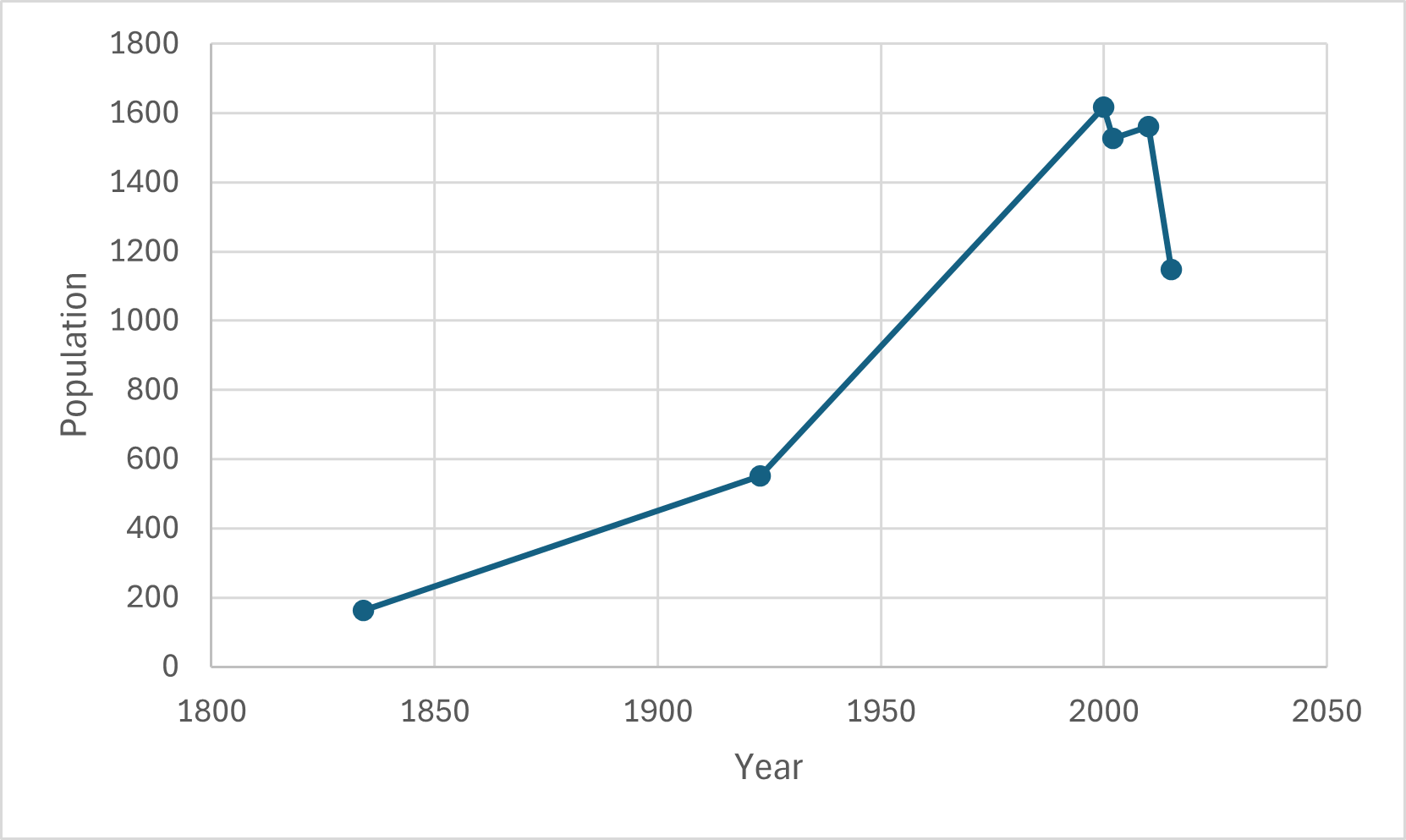
Historical population chart for Kosolapovo

== History and culture ==
=== History ===
The village is vaguely rumored to be "ancient", perhaps as far back as the Neolithic era, as evidenced by the findings of special stone axes and iron spears reminiscent of that era, but officially, archival documents from the 18th century show that the village used to be named "Bolshiye Toshkemy", owned by two clan families "Poksimet" and "Elbakht", and only became officially recognized as "Kosolapovo" in 1884. Kosolapovo's location between major cities Kazan and Kirov has contributed to its economic and population growth.

In 1811, the village had 12 households of 45 men, which grew to 18 households of 73 men and 90 women in 1834, and further grew to 67 households in 1891 - none of which were landowners at the time and relied on state agriculture.

Before state recognition, several local shops and a 3-year public school had already been built. A church (Nikolskaya Church) built in honor of Saint Nicholas (that was first constructed in 1838 out of wood and later rebuilt with stone in the 1880s) was also present. It took up a moderate portion of the village's land area and contained three altars, one of Saint Nicholas, one of Sergius of Radonezh and the last one, inspired by Dormition of the Mother of God, was left in the Kosolapovo area 800 years before in 1003 AD, but was conserved to be adjacent with the other two altars in the church. At the time, there was a great diversity of Christian beliefs in the village, so no one denomination of Christianity dominated the church.

One year after the Russian Revolution, in 1918, the Soviets authorized the village to be cogoverned by a local 'poor peasant' committee and a federal executive committee (whose building no longer exists), the first chairman of which was Commissar E.L. Mashkovtsev (who now has one of the streets in the village named after him). Additionally, an investigative commission was delegated in Kosolapovo to investigate socioeconomic tensions in the village over the collectivization of a local farm (which the state renamed after Mikhail Kalinin). The committees founded a district hospital the same year which is still in use today - originally developed in the span of six years, with ten staff members and three distinct departments serving maternity, typhus and miscellaneous diseases. A kindergarten for 50 children in the village was also opened around the same time.

In 1923, the two committees in charge of the village were merged into a single village council, with F. E. Popov appointed as the first chairman. At the time, the village had a population of 550 people; 240 men and 310 women.

From 1935 to 1937, the church was gradually closed (its bell tower destroyed by 1937), and replaced with both a community center and a boarding school on its land. Two years later, the village gained access to electricity and radio communication. Then, in 1940, a secondary school was built.

Between the late 19th century and the late 20th century, around 177 men had been conscripted for various conflicts from Kosolapovo, giving it a notable military history, but this number rose considerably during World War II (the Great Patriotic War), where almost all of the men in the village were conscripted to fight Nazi Germany forces, and the rest of the population was evacuated eastward. 106 of the conscripted soldiers died or went missing. In the aftermath, an orphanage was incorporated with the recently built secondary school, housing orphans from Moscow. A year after the end of the war, there was a major fire in the village, burning down a significant number of houses in the area, but the village was quickly rebuilt - along with an extra hydroelectric power station stationed on the bank of a nearby river. The power station project was unsuccessful because the dam kept being washed away by the river's turbulence, so it had to be dismantled.

In 1959, the district associated with Kosolapovo was abolished and its village council merged with the larger Mari-Tureksky District administration. Accompanying the decision, a state farm called "1 Maya" was built in the village throughout 1960, headed by A.I. Nesterenko and then G.M. Leonov.

In 2025, another fire occurred in the village when an insulated doorway was burnt down, but there were no reports of any injuries due to the fire.

=== Culture ===
From 1998 to 2000, the former library-church that was removed 60 years before was partially rebuilt as an ordinary Orthodox church, hosting its first public service in 2000. The church's rector appointed in 2002, Archpriest Alexander Milyutin, still does church service as of 2025.

As of 2023, the village's community center is called "Косолаповский сельский дом культуры" ("Kosolapovo Rural House of Culture" in English), and an ensemble who call themselves "Veselye Babushki" (ran by L.I. Brashkina) reportedly gather to sing there together on a regular basis, and occasionally venture out to the broader republic. The center was subject of an ethnographic field expedition by folklore association "Tsarev Gorod" of Chuvash State University in 2006 to document the village's culture and traditions.

In the center of the village (as of 2024), there is a garden named after S. R. Suvorov, the first Hero of the Soviet Union from the Mari people. In 1954, a monument to the hero was erected there. Also buried in the garden is the Mari writer and journalist Bogoslovsky Dmitry Fedorovich, who lived in Kosolapovo until the end of his life and worked for the local newspaper. In 1951 a bust monument was erected on his grave.

== Government ==
Since 2002, the village's official council has been headed by Timkin Nikolay Mikhailovich and its Kosolapovsky rural settlement administrative division is headed by Khamitov Gabdelbar Gabdelnurovich as of 2025.

In 2023, a sewage treatment plant was constructed in Kosolapovo as part of the 2019 "Volga Recovery" environmental project by the Russian federal government, overseen by the Mari El republican government.

== Economy ==
Kosolapovo's economy is mainly agricultural, relying on self-built housing and private farms, some of which are used for agricultural research.

As of 2024, apart from the historical buildings already mentioned, Kosolapovo also contains a post office, a gas station, eight local businesses and two main streets.

The regional cooperative society of Mari-Tureksky District is located in Kosolapovo. The headquarters building spans 0.15 hectares in area, but the Mari El republican government considers it a 'vacant investment site' on its register book.

== Education ==
Two boarding schools, along with a secondary school and a kindergarten, are still present in Kosolapovo as of 2025.

== Notable people ==
- Vyacheslav Kislitsyn, Russian politician, born 1948.
- Bogoslovsky Dmitry Fedorovich, Russian writer and journalist, inhabited Kosolapovo until his death in 1950.
- Smolentsev Ivan Ivanovich, Russian poet and inventor, inhabited Kosolapovo until his death in 1993.
