= Paranginsky District =

Paranginsky District Параньгинский район (Russian)
- District

Other transcription(s)
  - Meadow Mari: Поранча кундем
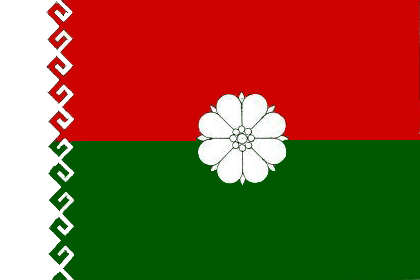
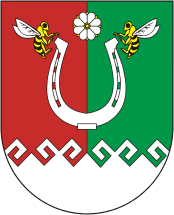
- Flag Coat of arms
- Location of Paranginsky District in the Mari El Republic
- Coordinates: 56.732°N 49.156°E
- Country: Russia
- Federal subject: Mari El Republic
- Established: 30 April 1931
- Administrative center: Paranga

Area
  - Total: 800 km^{2} (310 sq mi)

Population (2010 Census)
  - Total: 16,307
  - Density: 20/km^{2} (53/sq mi)
  - Urban: 36.7%
  - Rural: 63.3%

Administrative structure
  - Administrative divisions: 1 Urban-type settlements, 8 Rural okrugs
  - Inhabited localities: 1 urban-type settlements, 48 rural localities

Municipal structure
  - Municipally incorporated as: Paranginsky Municipal District
  - Municipal divisions: 1 urban settlements, 8 rural settlements
- Time zone: UTC+3 (MSK)
- OKTMO ID: 88644000
- Website: http://paranga.ru

Population of Paranginsky District
- 2010 Census: 16,307
- 2002 Census: 17,847
- 1989 Census: 19,439
- 1979 Census: 19,155

Paranginsky District (Russian: Параньги́нский райо́н; Meadow Mari: Поранча кундем, Poranča kundem) is an administrative and municipal district (raion), one of the fourteen in the Mari El Republic, Russia. It is located in the east of the republic. The area of the district is 800 square kilometers (310 sq mi). Its administrative center is the urban locality (an urban-type settlement) of Paranga. As of the 2010 Census, the total population of the district was 16,307, with the population of Paranga accounting for 36.7% of that number.

== Administrative and municipal status ==
Within the framework of administrative divisions, Paranginsky District is one of the fourteen in the republic. It is divided into one urban-type settlement (an administrative division with the administrative center in the urban-type settlement (inhabited locality) of Paranga) and eight rural okrugs, all of which comprise forty-eight rural localities. As a municipal division, the district is incorporated as Paranginsky Municipal District. Paranga Urban-Type Settlement is incorporated into an urban settlement. The eight rural okrugs are incorporated into eight rural settlements within the municipal district. The urban-type settlement of Paranga serves as the administrative center of both the administrative and municipal district.
