= Volzhsk =

Town in the Mari El Republic, Russia

Volzhsk Волжск
- Town

Other transcription(s)
  - Mari: Юлсер-Ола
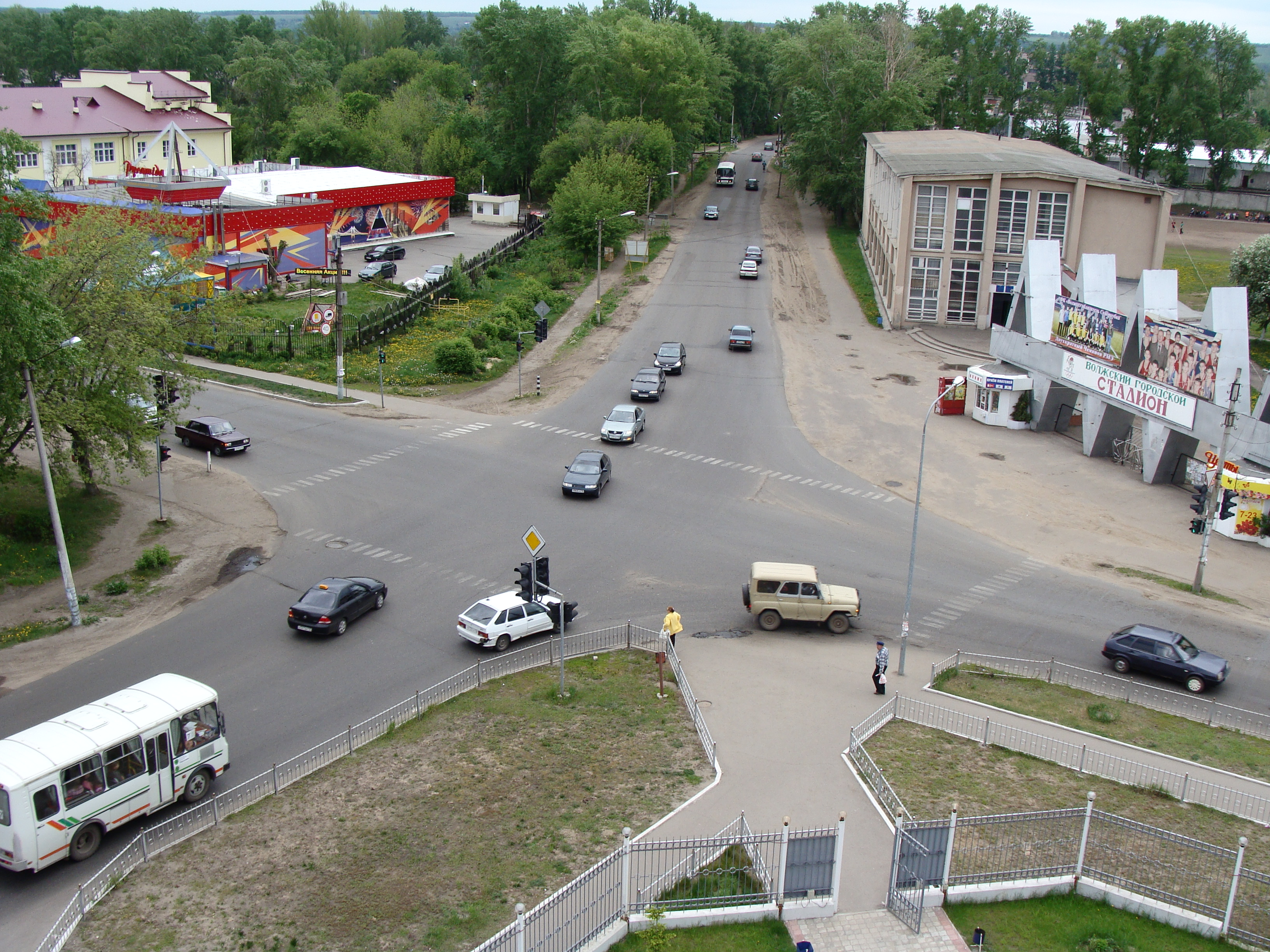
- Central part of Volzhsk

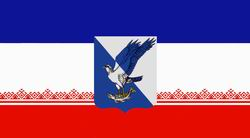
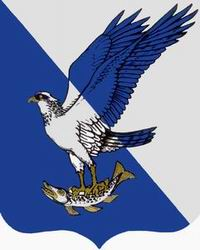
- Flag Coat of arms
- Interactive map of Volzhsk
- Location of Volzhsk Volzhsk (Mari El)
- Coordinates: 55°52′13″N 48°21′22″E
- Country: Russia
- Federal subject: Mari El
- Founded: 1940
- Elevation: 60 m (200 ft)

Population (2010 Census)
  - Total: 55,659
  - Estimate (2025): 51,054 (−8.3%)
  - Rank: 296th in 2010

Administrative status
  - Subordinated to: town of republic significance of Volzhsk
  - Capital of: town of republic significance of Volzhsk, Volzhsky District

Municipal status
  - Urban okrug: Volzhsk Urban Okrug
  - Capital of: Volzhsk Urban Okrug
- Time zone: UTC+3 (MSK)
- Postal code: 425000
- OKTMO ID: 88705000001

Volzhsk (Russian: Волжск; Mari: Юлсер-Ола, Julser-Ola) is a town in the Mari El Republic, Russia, located near the Mari El–Tatarstan–Chuvashia border and a part of the Kazan metropolitan area. Population: 55,659 (2010 census); 58,967 (2002 census); 60,919 (1989 Soviet census).

Historical population
Year	Pop.	±%
1939	19,500	—
1959	33,412	+71.3%
1970	42,977	+28.6%
1979	52,035	+21.1%
1989	60,919	+17.1%
2002	58,967	−3.2%
2010	55,659	−5.6%
2021	53,013	−4.8%
Source: Census data

== Administrative and municipal status ==
Within the framework of administrative divisions, Volzhsk serves as the administrative center of Volzhsky District, even though it is not a part of it. As an administrative division, it is incorporated separately as the town of republic significance of Volzhsk—an administrative unit with the status equal to that of the districts. As a municipal division, the town of republic significance of Volzhsk is incorporated as Volzhsk Urban Okrug.
