= Sernursky District =

Sernursky District Сернурский район (Russian)
- District

Other transcription(s)
  - Meadow Mari: Шернур кундем
- Flag Coat of arms
- Location of Sernursky District in the Mari El Republic
- Coordinates: 57.092°N 48.966°E
- Country: Russia
- Federal subject: Mari El Republic
- Established: 1921
- Administrative center: Sernur

Area
  - Total: 1,032 km^{2} (398 sq mi)

Population (2010 Census)
  - Total: 25,672
  - Density: 24.88/km^{2} (64.43/sq mi)
  - Urban: 33.8%
  - Rural: 66.2%

Administrative structure
  - Administrative divisions: 1 Urban-type settlements, 8 Rural okrugs
  - Inhabited localities: 1 urban-type settlements, 145 rural localities

Municipal structure
  - Municipally incorporated as: Sernursky Municipal District
  - Municipal divisions: 1 urban settlements, 8 rural settlements
- Time zone: UTC+3 (MSK)
- OKTMO ID: 88648000
- Website: http://mari-el.gov.ru/sernur

Population of Sernursky District
- 2010 Census: 25,672
- 2002 Census: 25,280
- 1989 Census: 27,263
- 1979 Census: 28,883

Sernursky District (Russian: Се́рнурский райо́н; Meadow Mari: Шернур кундем, Šernur kundem) is an administrative and municipal district (raion), one of the fourteen in the Mari El Republic, Russia. It is located in the northeast of the republic. The area of the district is 1,032 square kilometers (398 sq mi). Its administrative center is the urban locality (an urban-type settlement) of Sernur. As of the 2010 Census, the total population of the district was 25,672, with the population of Sernur accounting for 33.8% of that number.

== Administrative and municipal status ==
Within the framework of administrative divisions, Sernursky District is one of the fourteen in the republic. It is divided into 1 urban-type settlement (an administrative division with the administrative center in the urban-type settlement (inhabited locality) of Sernur) and 8 rural okrugs, all of which comprise 145 rural localities. As a municipal division, the district is incorporated as Sernursky Municipal District. Sernur Urban-Type Settlement is incorporated into an urban settlement, and the eight rural okrugs are incorporated into eight rural settlements within the municipal district. The urban-type settlement of Sernur serves as the administrative center of both the administrative and municipal district.
