= Nina Makarova =

Russian composer

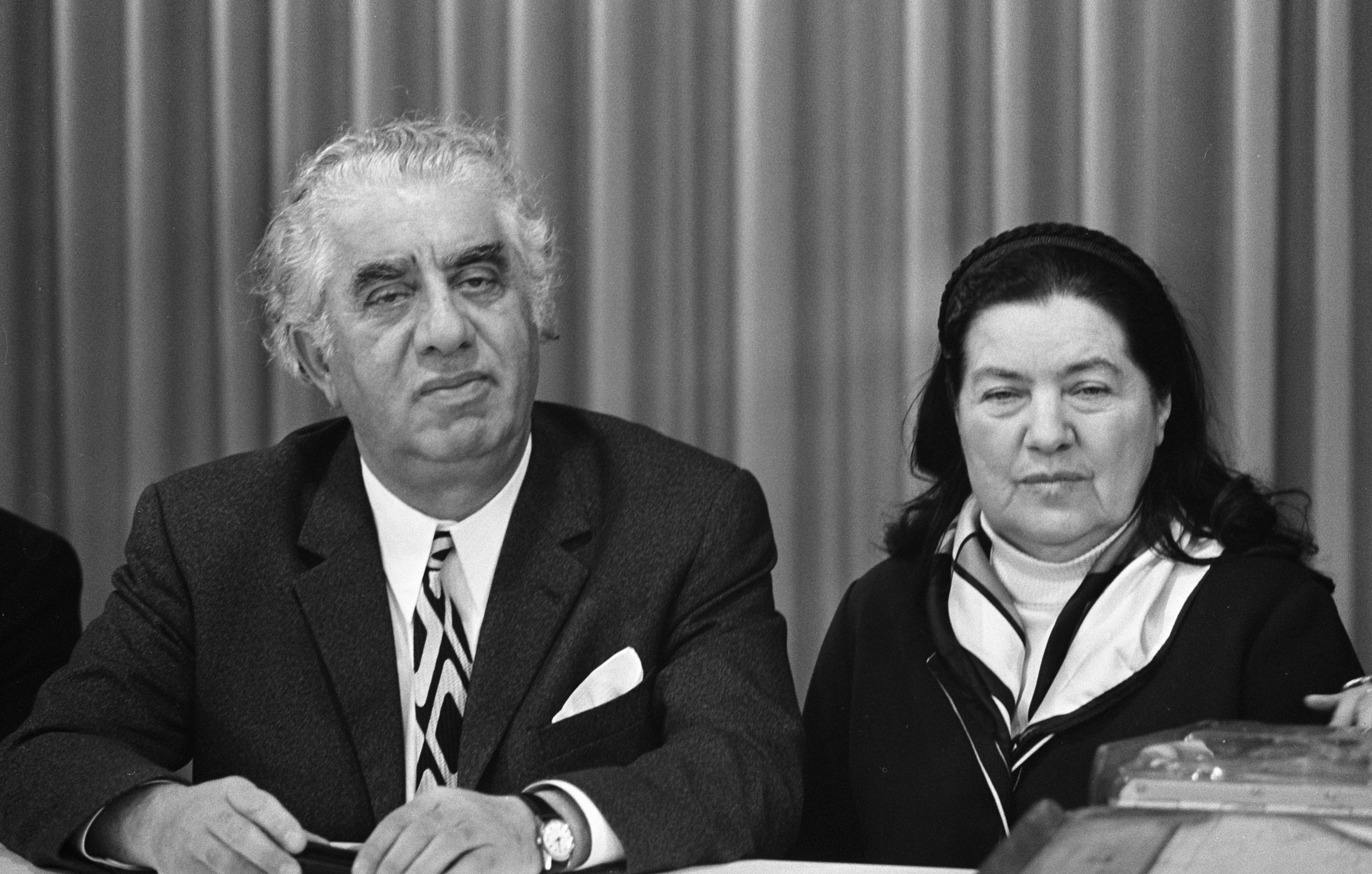
Aram Khachaturian and Nina Makarova in the Netherlands in 1971

Nina Vladimirovna Makarova (Russian: Нина Владимировна Макарова; 12 August [O.S. 30 July] 1908, Yurino, Nizhny Novgorod Governorate – 15 January 1976, Moscow) was a Russian composer who had great interest in Russian and Mari folksongs. She studied under Nikolai Myaskovsky, like composer Aram Khachaturian, whom she married in 1933. Her nickname was "Gayane" (Гаянэ). She conducted her symphony in Moscow on 12 June 1947. She also co-composed several pieces with her husband, including the music to Margarita Aliger's play "A Tale of Truth" (1947) and music to Yu. Chepurin's play "Spring Stream" (1953).

Nina and Aram's son, Karen, became an art critic.

== Works ==
- Two Melodies for oboe and piano
- Piano Sonatina (1933)
- Violin Sonata (1934)
- Two Melodies for violin and piano
- Symphony in D minor (1938) – revised in 1962. CD Russian Disc RDCD 11382: USSR SO, O. Koch (cond)
- Six Etudes for piano (1938)
- "Cantata for Molotov" for soloists, chorus and orchestra (1940)
- Song Cycle after Pushkin
- Song Cycle after Rustaveli
- Children Song dedicated to Stalin
- Music to the Play "A Tale of Truth" after M. Aliger – composed jointly with Aram Khachaturian. First Performance: 1947, Moscow, Central Theater of the Red Army. Producer: A. Okunchikov. Designer: N. Shifrin.
- Music to the Film "The Change of Luck"
- Music to the Film "In the Country of the Dolls"
- Song cycle "In the Days of War"
- "Courage", opera in one act (1948) – unfinished.
- Music to the Play "Spring Stream" after Yu. Chepurin – composed jointly with Aram Khachaturian. First Performance: 18 November 1953, Moscow, Central Theater of the Soviet Army. Directors: A. Popov and A. Okunchikov. Designer: Yu. Pimenov.
- "Zoja", opera (1963)
- Fresco "Nefertiti's Procession" for harp – dedicated to Vera Dulova.
- Waltz for harp – written for Vera Dulova.
