= Novotoryalsky District =

Novotoryalsky District Новоторъяльский район (Russian)
- District

Other transcription(s)
  - Meadow Mari: У Торъял кундем
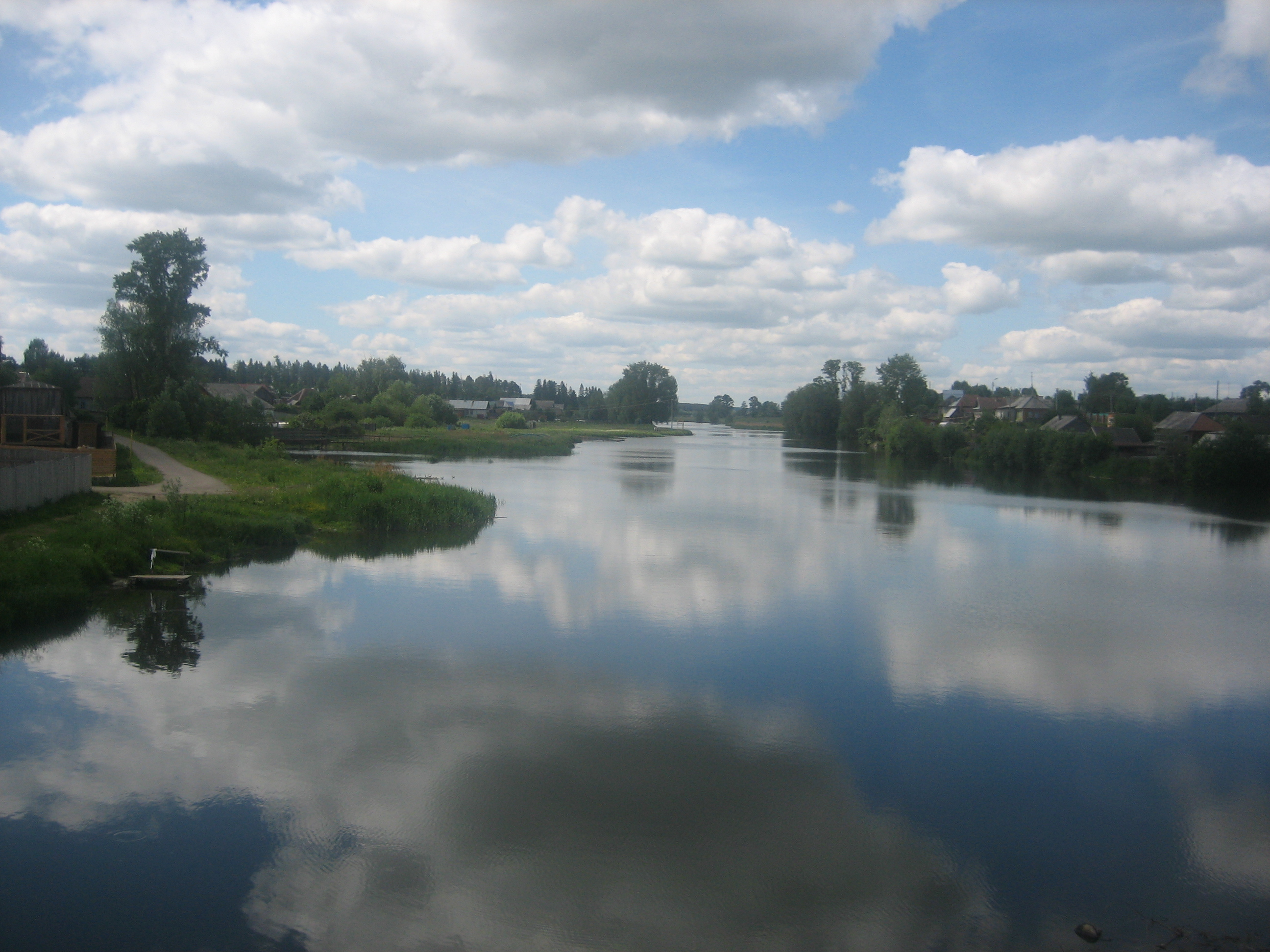
- A pond on the Shukshan River near Novy Toryal, Novotoryalsky District

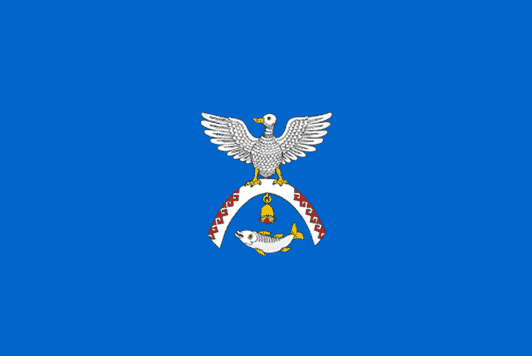
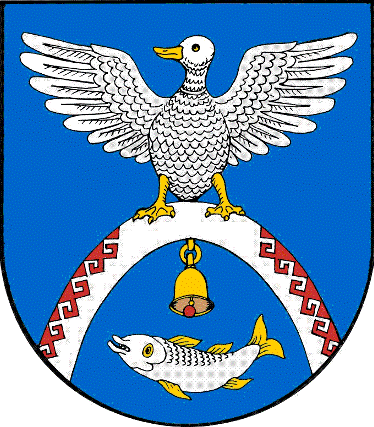
- Flag Coat of arms
- Location of Novotoryalsky District in the Mari El Republic
- Coordinates: 57°05′00″N 48°40′00″E
- Country: Russia
- Federal subject: Mari El Republic
- Established: 1924
- Administrative center: Novy Toryal

Area
  - Total: 920 km^{2} (360 sq mi)

Population (2010 Census)
  - Total: 17,124
  - Density: 19/km^{2} (48/sq mi)
  - Urban: 38.7%
  - Rural: 61.3%

Administrative structure
  - Administrative divisions: 1 Urban-type settlements, 4 Rural okrugs
  - Inhabited localities: 1 urban-type settlements, 151 rural localities

Municipal structure
  - Municipally incorporated as: Novotoryalsky Municipal District
  - Municipal divisions: 1 urban settlements, 4 rural settlements
- Time zone: UTC+3 (MSK)
- OKTMO ID: 88636000
- Website: http://toryal.ru

Population of Novotoryalsky District
- 2010 Census: 17,124
- 2002 Census: 18,543
- 1989 Census: 20,628
- 1979 Census: 20,973

Novotoryalsky District (Russian: Новоторъя́льский райо́н; Meadow Mari: У Торъял кундем, U Torjal kundem) is an administrative and municipal district (raion), one of the fourteen in the Mari El Republic, Russia. It is located in the northeast of the republic. The area of the district is 920 square kilometers (360 sq mi). Its administrative center is the urban locality (an urban-type settlement) of Novy Toryal. As of the 2010 Census, the total population of the district was 17,124, with the population of Novy Toryal accounting for 38.7% of that number.

== Administrative and municipal status ==
Within the framework of administrative divisions, Novotoryalsky District is one of the fourteen in the republic. It is divided into 1 urban-type settlement (an administrative division with the administrative center in the urban-type settlement (inhabited locality) of Novy Toryal) and 4 rural okrugs, all of which comprise 151 rural localities. As a municipal division, the district is incorporated as Novotoryalsky Municipal District. Novy Toryal Urban-Type Settlement is incorporated into an urban settlement, and the four rural okrugs are incorporated into four rural settlements within the municipal district. The urban-type settlement of Novy Toryal serves as the administrative center of both the administrative and municipal district.
