= Sovetsky District, Mari El Republic =

Sovetsky District Советский район (Russian)
- District

Other transcription(s)
  - Meadow Mari: У Роҥго кундем
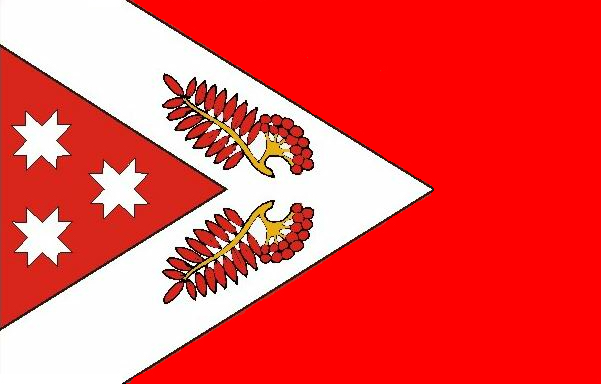
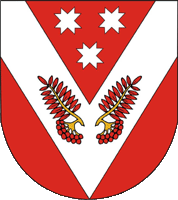
- Flag Coat of arms
- Location of Sovetsky District in the Mari El Republic
- Coordinates: 56°45′N 48°29′E
- Country: Russia
- Federal subject: Mari El Republic
- Established: 25 January 1935
- Administrative center: Sovetsky

Area
  - Total: 1,421 km^{2} (549 sq mi)

Population (2010 Census)
  - Total: 31,081
  - Density: 21.87/km^{2} (56.65/sq mi)
  - Urban: 34.3%
  - Rural: 65.7%

Administrative structure
  - Administrative divisions: 1 Urban-type settlements, 7 Rural okrugs
  - Inhabited localities: 1 urban-type settlements, 140 rural localities

Municipal structure
  - Municipally incorporated as: Sovetsky Municipal District
  - Municipal divisions: 1 urban settlements, 7 rural settlements
- Time zone: UTC+3 (MSK)
- OKTMO ID: 88652000
- Website: http://mari-el.gov.ru/sovetsk

Population of Sovetsky District
- 2010 Census: 31,081
- 2002 Census: 31,403
- 1989 Census: 33,024
- 1979 Census: 30,681

Sovetsky District (Russian: Сове́тский райо́н; Meadow Mari: У Роҥго кундем, U Roŋgo kundem) is an administrative and municipal district (raion), one of the fourteen in the Mari El Republic, Russia. It is located in the center of the republic. The area of the district is 1,421 square kilometers (549 sq mi). Its administrative center is the urban locality (an urban-type settlement) of Sovetsky. As of the 2010 Census, the total population of the district was 31,081, with the population of the administrative center accounting for 34.3% of that number.

== Administrative and municipal status ==
Within the framework of administrative divisions, Sovetsky District is one of the fourteen in the republic. It is divided into 1 urban-type settlement (an administrative division with the administrative center in the urban-type settlement (inhabited locality) of Sovetsky) and 7 rural okrugs, all of which comprise 140 rural localities. As a municipal division, the district is incorporated as Sovetsky Municipal District. Sovetsky Urban-Type Settlement is incorporated into an urban settlement, and the seven rural okrugs are incorporated into seven rural settlements within the municipal district. The urban-type settlement of Sovetsky serves as the administrative center of both the administrative and municipal district.
