= Yurino, Mari El Republic =

Yurino Юрино
- Urban-type settlement

Other transcription(s)
  - Meadow Mari: Йӱрнӧ
  - Hill Mari: Йӱрнӹ
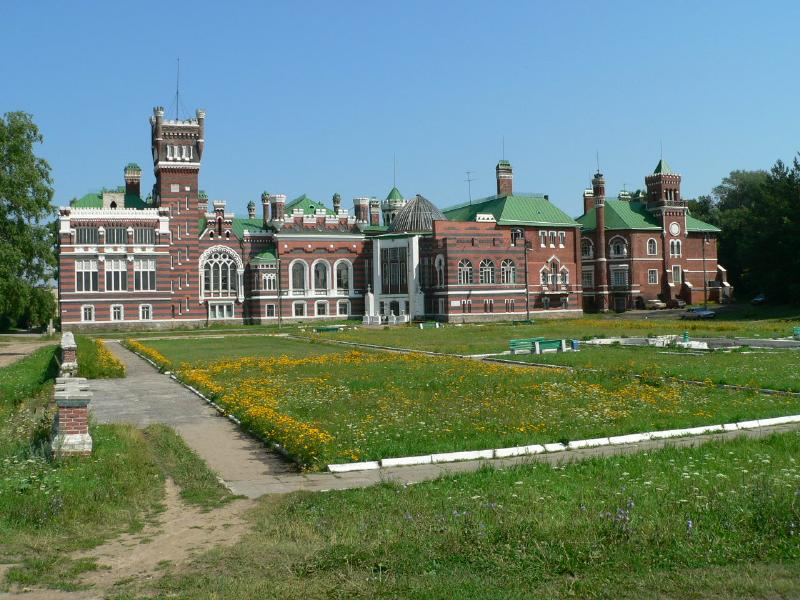
- Sheremetyev Castle in Yurino
- Interactive map of Yurino
- Location of Yurino Yurino (Mari El)
- Coordinates: 56°18′N 46°17′E
- Country: Russia
- Federal subject: Mari El
- Administrative district: Yurinsky District
- Urban-type settlementSelsoviet: Yurino Urban-Type Settlement

Population (2010 Census)
  - Total: 3,465
  - Estimate (2025): 2,424 (−30%)

Administrative status
  - Capital of: Yurinsky District, Yurino Urban-Type Settlement

Municipal status
  - Municipal district: Yurinsky Municipal District
  - Urban settlement: Yurino Urban Settlement
  - Capital of: Yurinsky Municipal District, Yurino Urban Settlement
- Time zone: UTC+3 (MSK)
- Postal code: 425370
- OKTMO ID: 88656151051

Yurino population
- 2010 Census: 3,465
- 2002 Census: 4,251
- 1989 Census: 5,177
- 1979 Census: 5,960

Yurino (Russian: Ю́рино; Meadow Mari: Йӱрнӧ, Jürnö; Hill Mari: Йӱрнӹ, Jürnÿ) is an urban locality (an urban-type settlement) and the administrative center of Yurinsky District of the Mari El Republic, Russia, located on the Cheboksary Reservoir, near the confluence of the Volga and Vetluga Rivers. As of the 2010 Census, its population was 3,465.

== Administrative and municipal status ==
Within the framework of administrative divisions, Yurino serves as the administrative center of Yurinsky District. As an administrative division, the urban-type settlement of Yurino is incorporated within Yurinsky District as Yurino Urban-Type Settlement (an administrative division of the district). As a municipal division, Yurino Urban-Type Settlement is incorporated within Yurinsky Municipal District as Yurino Urban Settlement.

== Notable residents ==
- Nina Makarova (1908–1976), composer
