= Podgorny, Vologda Oblast =

Podgorny Подгорный
- Settlement
- Location within Vologda Oblast Location within Russia
- Coordinates: 59°15′N 38°35′E
- Country: Russia
- Region: Vologda Oblast
- District: Sheksninsky District
- Time zone: UTC+3:00

Podgorny (Russian: Подгорный) is a rural locality (a settlement) in Churovskoye Rural Settlement, Sheksninsky District, Vologda Oblast, Russia. The population was 537 as of 2002.

== Geography ==
Podgorny is located 14 km northeast of Sheksna (the district's administrative centre) by road. Churovskoye is the nearest rural locality.
