= Orshansky District =

Orshansky District Оршанский район (Russian)
- District

Other transcription(s)
  - Meadow Mari: Оршанке кундем
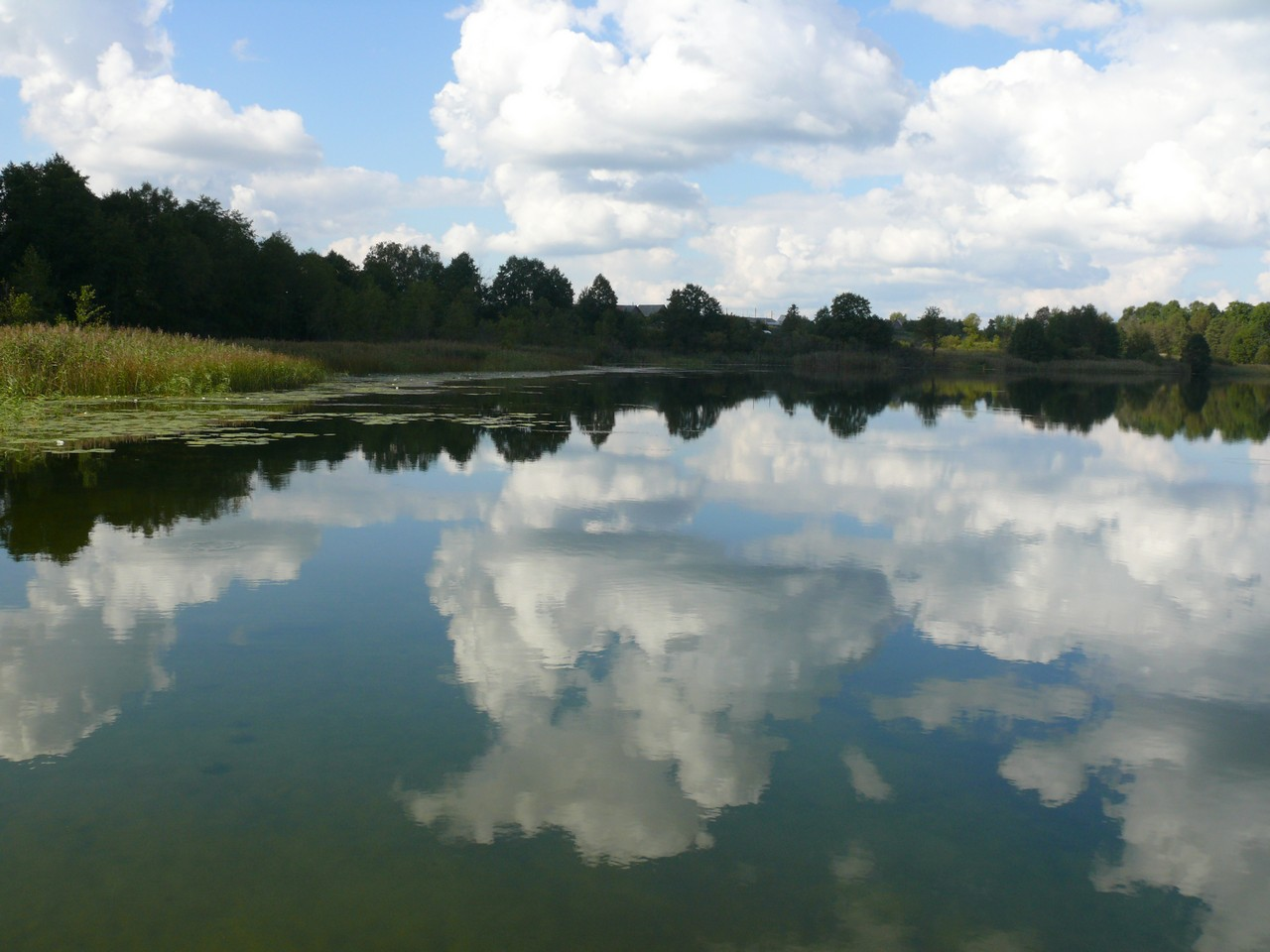
- Lake Tabashinskoye, a protected area of Russia in Orshansky District

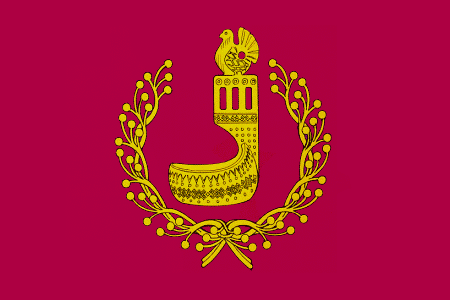
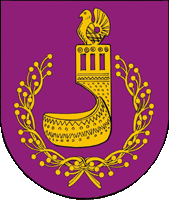
- Flag Coat of arms
- Location of Orshansky District in the Mari El Republic
- Coordinates: 55.895°N 48.033°E
- Country: Russia
- Federal subject: Mari El Republic
- Established: 28 August 1924
- Administrative center: Orshanka

Area
  - Total: 897 km^{2} (346 sq mi)

Population (2010 Census)
  - Total: 15,139
  - Density: 16.9/km^{2} (43.7/sq mi)
  - Urban: 43.5%
  - Rural: 56.5%

Administrative structure
  - Administrative divisions: 1 Urban-type settlements, 3 Rural okrugs
  - Inhabited localities: 1 urban-type settlements, 72 rural localities

Municipal structure
  - Municipally incorporated as: Orshansky Municipal District
  - Municipal divisions: 1 urban settlements, 3 rural settlements
- Time zone: UTC+3 (MSK)
- OKTMO ID: 88640000
- Website: http://portal.mari.ru/orshanka/default.aspx

Population of Orshansky District
- 2010 Census: 15,139
- 2002 Census: 15,832
- 1989 Census: 16,282
- 1979 Census: 15,523

Orshansky District (Russian: Орша́нский райо́н; Meadow Mari: Оршанке кундем, Oršanke kundem) is an administrative and municipal district (raion), one of the fourteen in the Mari El Republic, Russia. It is located in the north of the republic. The area of the district is 897 square kilometers (346 sq mi). Its administrative center is the urban locality (an urban-type settlement) of Orshanka. As of the 2010 Census, the total population of the district was 15,139, with the population of Orshanka accounting for 43.5% of that number.

== Administrative and municipal status ==
Within the framework of administrative divisions, Orshansky District is one of the fourteen in the republic. It is divided into one urban-type settlement (an administrative division with the administrative center in the urban-type settlement (inhabited locality) of Orshanka) and three rural okrugs, all of which comprise seventy-two rural localities. As a municipal division, the district is incorporated as Orshansky Municipal District. Orshanka Urban-Type Settlement is incorporated into an urban settlement, and the three rural okrugs are incorporated into three rural settlements within the municipal district. The urban-type settlement of Orshanka serves as the administrative center of both the administrative and municipal district.
