= Zvenigovsky District =

Zvenigovsky District Звениговский район (Russian)
- District

Other transcription(s)
  - Meadow Mari: Провой кундем
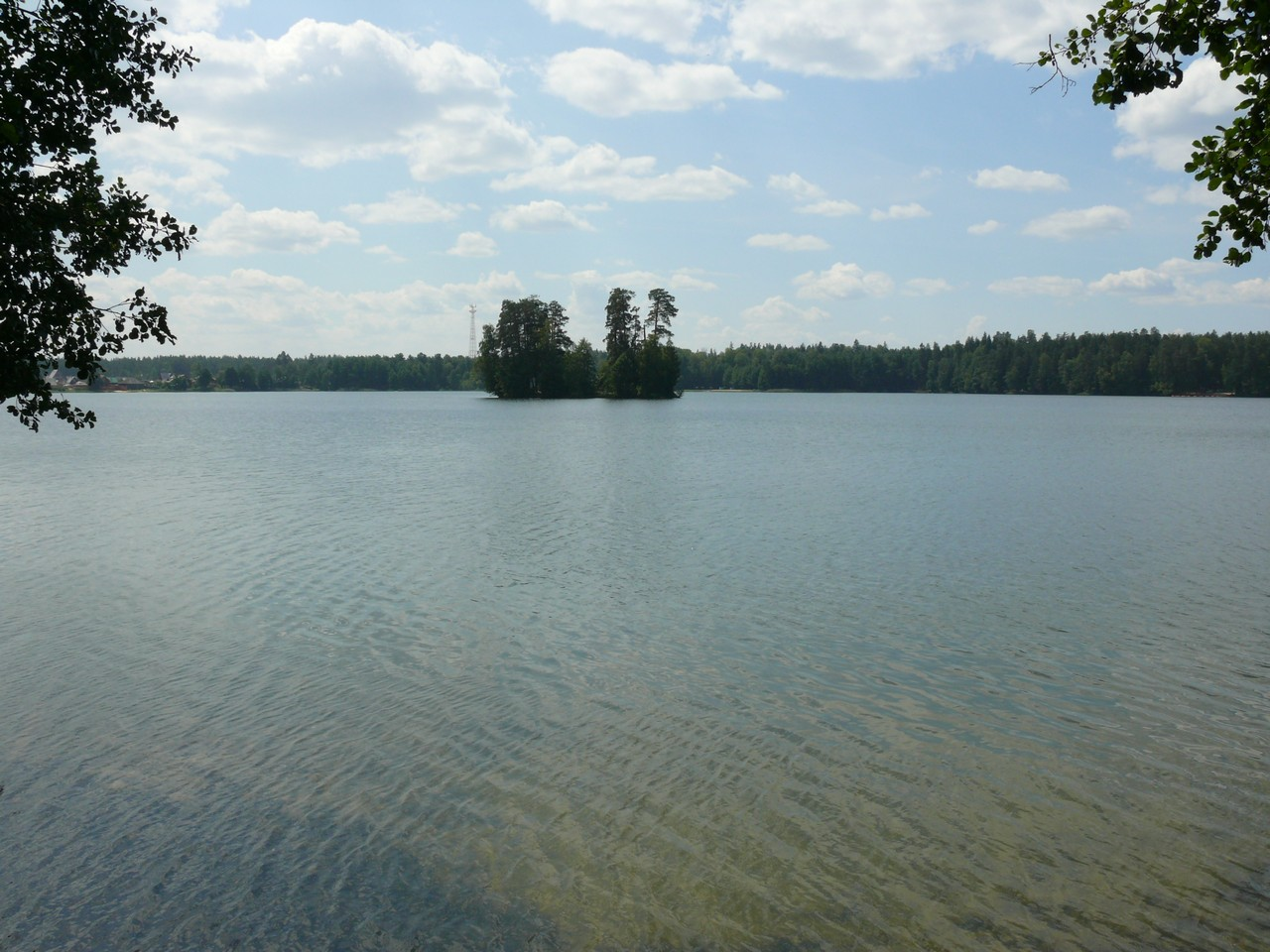
- Lake Tair, a protected area of Russia in Zvenigovsky District

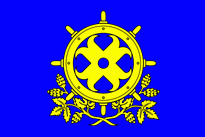
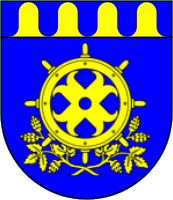
- Flag Coat of arms
- Location of Zvenigovsky District in the Mari El Republic
- Coordinates: 55°59′N 48°02′E
- Country: Russia
- Federal subject: Mari El Republic
- Administrative center: Zvenigovo

Area
  - Total: 2,748 km^{2} (1,061 sq mi)

Population (2010 Census)
  - Total: 44,976
  - Density: 16.37/km^{2} (42.39/sq mi)
  - Urban: 48.5%
  - Rural: 51.5%

Administrative structure
  - Administrative divisions: 1 Towns of district significance, 2 Urban-type settlements, 7 Rural okrugs
  - Inhabited localities: 1 cities/towns, 2 urban-type settlements, 80 rural localities

Municipal structure
  - Municipally incorporated as: Zvenigovsky Municipal District
  - Municipal divisions: 3 urban settlements, 7 rural settlements
- Time zone: UTC+3 (MSK)
- OKTMO ID: 88612000
- Website: http://admzven.ru

Population of Zvenigovsky District
- 2010 Census: 44,976
- 2002 Census: 46,267
- 1989 Census: 50,905
- 1979 Census: 49,299

Zvenigovsky District (Russian: Звени́говский райо́н; Meadow Mari: Провой кундем, Provoj kundem) is an administrative and municipal district (raion), one of the fourteen in the Mari El Republic, Russia. It is located in the south of the republic. The area of the district is 2,748 square kilometers (1,061 sq mi). Its administrative center is the town of Zvenigovo. As of the 2010 Census, the total population of the district was 44,976, with the population of Zvenigovo accounting for 26.6% of that number.

== Administrative and municipal status ==
Within the framework of administrative divisions, Zvenigovsky District is one of the fourteen in the republic. It is divided into one town of district significance (Zvenigovo), two urban-type settlements (administrative divisions with the administrative centers in the urban-type settlements (inhabited localities) of Krasnogorsky and Suslonger), and seven rural okrugs, all of which comprise eighty rural localities. As a municipal division, the district is incorporated as Zvenigovsky Municipal District. The town of district significance and the two urban-type settlements are incorporated into three urban settlements, and the seven rural okrugs are incorporated into seven rural settlements within the municipal district. The town of Zvenigovo serves as the administrative center of both the administrative and municipal district.
