= Podgornaya, Vashkinsky District, Vologda Oblast =

Podgornaya Подгорная
- Village
- Location within Vologda Oblast Location within Russia
- Coordinates: 60°29′N 37°28′E
- Country: Russia
- Region: Vologda Oblast
- District: Vashkinsky District
- Time zone: UTC+3:00

Podgornaya (Russian: Подгорная) is a rural locality (a village) in Porechenskoye Rural Settlement, Vashkinsky District, Vologda Oblast, Russia. The population was 11 as of 2002.

== Geography ==
Podgornaya is located 58 km northwest of Lipin Bor (the district's administrative centre) by road. Kharbovo is the nearest rural locality.
