= Novy Toryal =

Novy Toryal Новый Торъял
- Urban-type settlement

Other transcription(s)
  - Meadow Mari: У Торъял
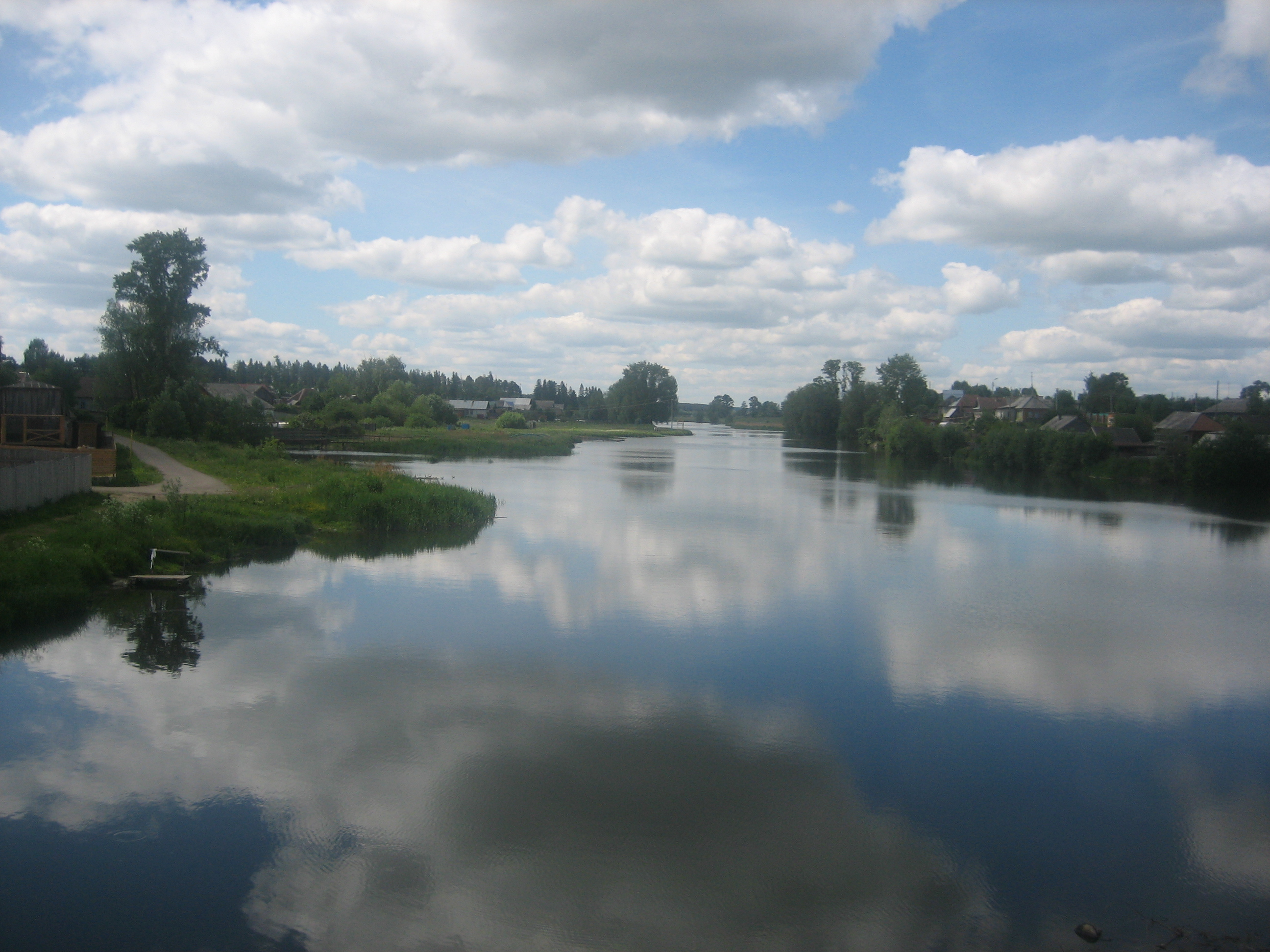
- A pond on the Shukshan River in Novy Toryal
- Interactive map of Novy Toryal
- Location of Novy Toryal Novy Toryal (Mari El)
- Coordinates: 57°01′N 48°44′E
- Country: Russia
- Federal subject: Mari El
- Administrative district: Novotoryalsky District
- Urban-type settlementSelsoviet: Novy Toryal Urban-Type Settlement
- Founded: 1815

Population (2010 Census)
  - Total: 6,635
  - Estimate (2025): 5,508 (−17%)

Administrative status
  - Capital of: Novotoryalsky District, Novy Toryal Urban-Type Settlement

Municipal status
  - Municipal district: Novotoryalsky Municipal District
  - Urban settlement: Novy Toryal Urban Settlement
  - Capital of: Novotoryalsky Municipal District, Novy Toryal Urban Settlement
- Time zone: UTC+3 (MSK)
- Postal code: 425430
- OKTMO ID: 88636151051

Novy Toryal population
- 2010 Census: 6,635
- 2002 Census: 7,266
- 1989 Census: 8,057
- 1979 Census: 6,621

Novy Toryal (Russian: Но́вый Торъя́л; Meadow Mari: У Торъял, U Torjal) is an urban locality (an urban-type settlement) and the administrative center of Novotoryalsky District of the Mari El Republic, Russia. As of the 2010 Census, its population was 6,635.

== Administrative and municipal status ==
Within the framework of administrative divisions, Novy Toryal serves as the administrative center of Novotoryalsky District. As an administrative division, the urban-type settlement of Novy Toryal, together with one rural locality (the village of Petrichata), is incorporated within Novotoryalsky District as Novy Toryal Urban-Type Settlement (an administrative division of the district). As a municipal division, Novy Toryal Urban-Type Settlement is incorporated within Novotoryalsky Municipal District as Novy Toryal Urban Settlement.
