= Podgorny, Altai Krai =

Podgorny Подгорный
- Settlement
- Location within Altai Krai Location within Russia
- Coordinates: 53°29′N 81°42′E
- Country: Russia
- Region: Altai Krai
- District: Shelabolikhinsky District
- Time zone: UTC+7:00

Podgorny (Russian: Подгорный) is a rural locality (a settlement) in Krutishinsky Selsoviet, Shelabolikhinsky District, Altai Krai, Russia. The population was 316 as of 2013. There are 2 streets.

== Geography ==
Podgorny is located 67 km west of Shelabolikha (the district's administrative centre) by road. Lugovoye is the nearest rural locality.
