= Sernur =

Sernur Сернур
- Urban-type settlement

Other transcription(s)
  - Meadow Mari: Шернур
- Interactive map of Sernur
- Location of Sernur Sernur (Mari El)
- Coordinates: 56°56′N 49°09′E
- Country: Russia
- Federal subject: Mari El
- Administrative district: Sernursky District
- Urban-type settlementSelsoviet: Sernur Urban-Type Settlement
- Founded: 17th century

Population (2010 Census)
  - Total: 8,686
  - Estimate (2025): 7,912 (−8.9%)

Administrative status
  - Capital of: Sernursky District, Sernur Urban-Type Settlement

Municipal status
  - Municipal district: Sernursky Municipal District
  - Urban settlement: Sernur Urban Settlement
  - Capital of: Sernursky Municipal District, Sernur Urban Settlement
- Time zone: UTC+3 (MSK)
- Postal codes: 425450, 425477–425479
- OKTMO ID: 88648151051

Sernur population
- 2010 Census: 8,686
- 2002 Census: 9,031
- 1989 Census: 10,196
- 1979 Census: 8,425

Sernur (Russian: Се́рнур; Meadow Mari: Шернур, Šernur) is an urban locality (an urban-type settlement) and the administrative center of Sernursky District of the Mari El Republic, Russia. As of the 2010 Census, its population was 8,686.

== Administrative and municipal status ==
Within the framework of administrative divisions, Sernur serves as the administrative center of Sernursky District. As an administrative division, the urban-type settlement of Sernur, together with three rural localities, is incorporated within Sernursky District as Sernur Urban-Type Settlement (an administrative division of the district). As a municipal division, Sernur Urban-Type Settlement is incorporated within Sernursky Municipal District as Sernur Urban Settlement.
