= Paranga, Russia =

Paranga Параньга
- Urban-type settlement

Other transcription(s)
  - Meadow Mari: Поранча
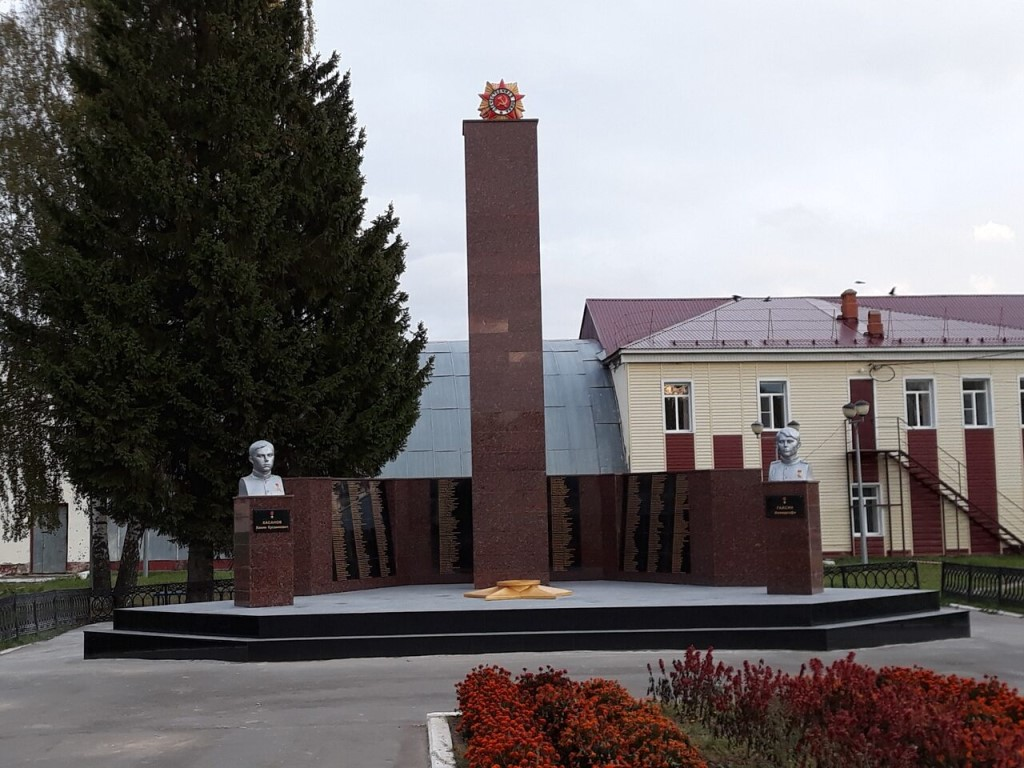
- Obelisk to the fallen in battles in the Great Patriotic War in the village of Parangin

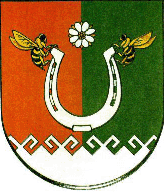
- Coat of arms
- Interactive map of Paranga
- Location of Paranga Paranga (Mari El)
- Coordinates: 56°43′N 49°25′E
- Country: Russia
- Federal subject: Mari El
- Administrative district: Paranginsky District
- Urban-type settlementSelsoviet: Paranga Urban-Type Settlement
- Founded: 1550 (Julian)

Population (2010 Census)
  - Total: 5,985
  - Estimate (2025): 5,188 (−13.3%)

Administrative status
  - Capital of: Paranginsky District, Paranga Urban-Type Settlement

Municipal status
  - Municipal district: Paranginsky Municipal District
  - Urban settlement: Paranga Urban Settlement
  - Capital of: Paranginsky Municipal District, Paranga Urban Settlement
- Time zone: UTC+3 (MSK)
- Postal code: 425570
- OKTMO ID: 88644151051

Paranga population
- 2010 Census: 5,985
- 2002 Census: 6,716
- 1989 Census: 6,863
- 1979 Census: 5,532

Paranga (Russian: Параньга́; Meadow Mari: Поранча, Poranča) is an urban locality (an urban-type settlement) and the administrative center of Paranginsky District of the Mari El Republic, Russia. As of the 2010 Census, its population was 5,985.

== Administrative and municipal status ==
Within the framework of administrative divisions, Paranga serves as the administrative center of Paranginsky District. As an administrative division, the urban-type settlement of Paranga, together with one rural locality (the village of Lyazhberdino), is incorporated within Paranginsky District as Paranga Urban-Type Settlement (an administrative division of the district). As a municipal division, Paranga Urban-Type Settlement is incorporated within Paranginsky Municipal District as Paranga Urban Settlement.
