= Podgorny, Republic of Bashkortostan =

Podgorny Подгорный
- Village
- Location within Bashkortostan Location within Russia
- Coordinates: 53°35′N 56°34′E
- Country: Russia
- Region: Bashkortostan
- District: Ishimbaysky District
- Time zone: UTC+5:00

Podgorny (Russian: Подгорный) is a rural locality (a village) in Makarovsky Selsoviet, Ishimbaysky District, Bashkortostan, Russia. The population was 26 as of 2010. There are 2 streets.

== Geography ==
Podgorny is located 52 km northeast of Ishimbay (the district's administrative centre) by road. Ziganovka is the nearest rural locality.
