= Morkinsky District =

Morkinsky District Моркинский район (Russian)
- District

Other transcription(s)
  - Meadow Mari: Морко кундем
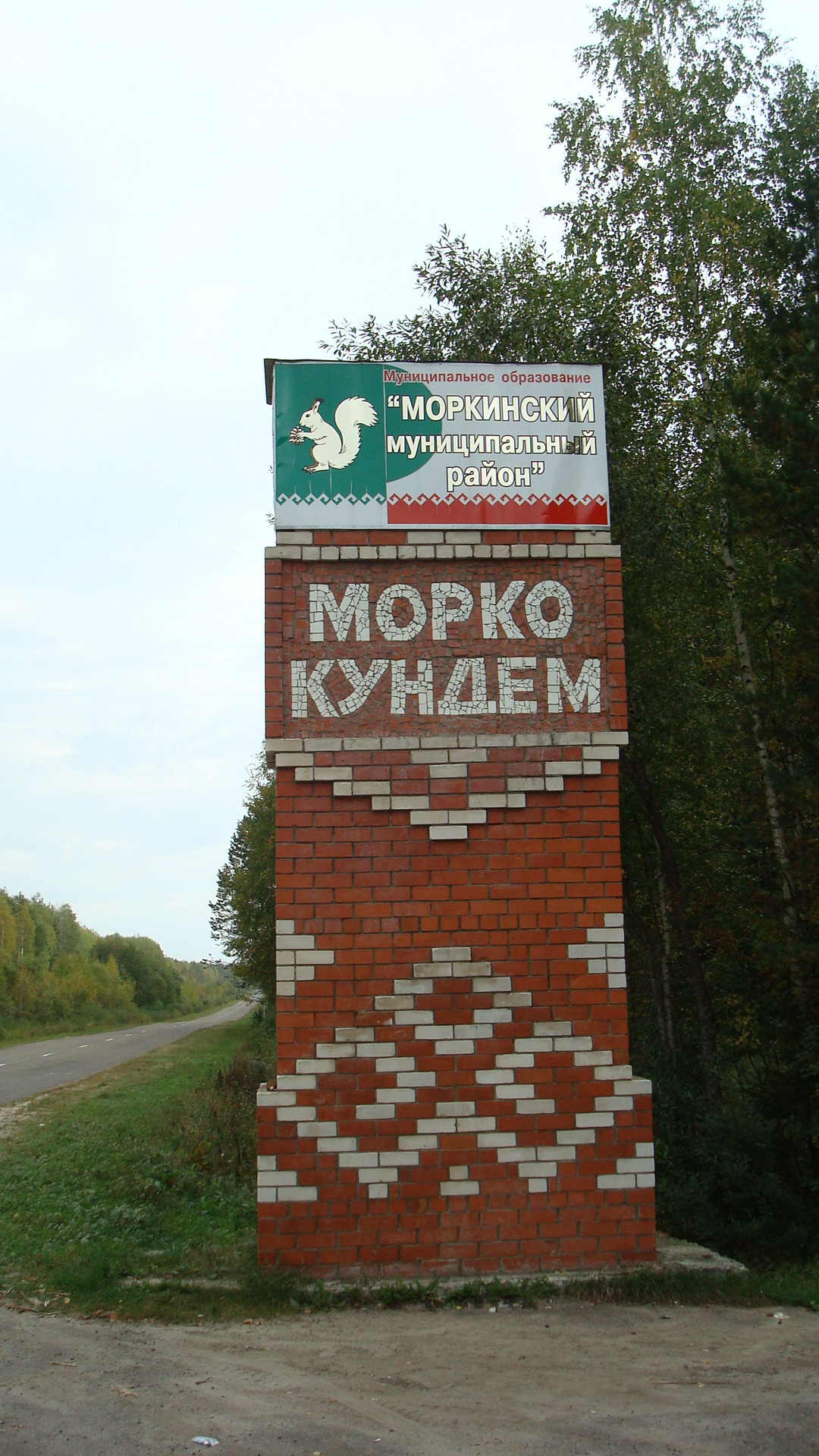
- Welcome sign at the entrance to Morkinsky District

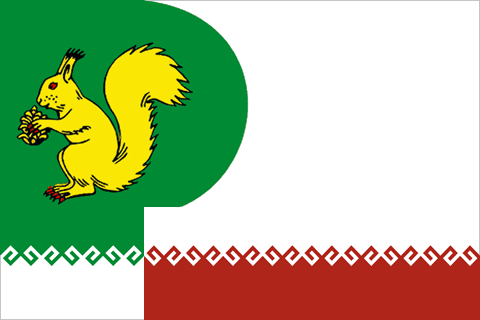
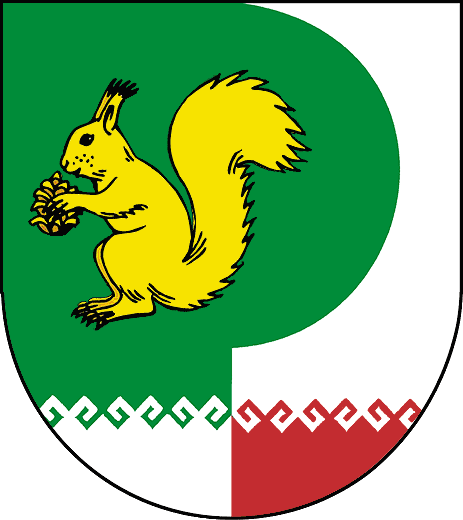
- Flag Coat of arms
- Location of Morkinsky District in the Mari El Republic
- Coordinates: 56.448°N 48.916°E
- Country: Russia
- Federal subject: Mari El Republic
- Established: 28 August 1924
- Administrative center: Morki

Area
  - Total: 2,272 km^{2} (877 sq mi)

Population (2010 Census)
  - Total: 32,403
  - Density: 14.26/km^{2} (36.94/sq mi)
  - Urban: 30.6%
  - Rural: 69.4%

Administrative structure
  - Administrative divisions: 1 Urban-type settlements, 9 Rural okrugs
  - Inhabited localities: 1 urban-type settlements, 150 rural localities

Municipal structure
  - Municipally incorporated as: Morkinsky Municipal District
  - Municipal divisions: 1 urban settlements, 9 rural settlements
- Time zone: UTC+3 (MSK)
- OKTMO ID: 88632000
- Website: http://mari-el.gov.ru/morki/Pages/main.aspx

Population of Morkinsky District
- 2010 Census: 32,403
- 2002 Census: 35,443
- 1989 Census: 39,142
- 1979 Census: 43,627

Morkinsky District (Russian: Морки́нский райо́н; Meadow Mari: Морко кундем, Morko kundem) is an administrative and municipal district (raion), one of the fourteen in the Mari El Republic, Russia. It is located in the southeast of the republic. The area of the district is 2,272 square kilometers (877 sq mi). Its administrative center is the urban locality (an urban-type settlement) of Morki. As of the 2010 Census, the total population of the district was 32,403, with the population of Morki accounting for 30.6% of that number.

== Administrative and municipal status ==
Within the framework of administrative divisions, Morkinsky District is one of the fourteen in the republic. It is divided into 1 urban-type settlement (an administrative division with the administrative center in the urban-type settlement (inhabited locality) of Morki) and 9 rural okrugs, all of which comprise 150 rural localities. As a municipal division, the district is incorporated as Morkinsky Municipal District. Morki Urban-Type Settlement is incorporated into an urban settlement, and the nine rural okrugs are incorporated into nine rural settlements within the municipal district. The urban-type settlement of Morki serves as the administrative center of both the administrative and municipal district.
