= Yurinsky (rural locality) =

Yurinsky (Russian: Юринский; masculine), Yurinskaya (Юринская; feminine), or Yurinskoye (Юринское; neuter) is the name of several rural localities in Russia:

- Yurinsky, Orenburg Oblast, a settlement in Pushkinsky Selsoviet of Krasnogvardeysky District of Orenburg Oblast
- Yurinsky, Yaroslavl Oblast, a crossing loop in Makarovsky Rural Okrug of Rybinsky District of Yaroslavl Oblast
- Yurinskaya, Moscow Oblast, a village in Ramenskoye Rural Settlement of Yegoryevsky District of Moscow Oblast
- Yurinskaya, Yaroslavl Oblast, a village in Florovsky Rural Okrug of Myshkinsky District of Yaroslavl Oblast
