= Sovetsky, Mari El Republic =

Sovetsky Советский
- Urban-type settlement

Other transcription(s)
  - Meadow Mari: У Роҥго
- Interactive map of Sovetsky
- Location of Sovetsky Sovetsky (Mari El)
- Coordinates: 56°46′N 48°29′E
- Country: Russia
- Federal subject: Mari El
- Administrative district: Sovetsky District
- Urban-type settlementSelsoviet: Sovetsky Urban-Type Settlement
- Founded: 1958

Population (2010 Census)
  - Total: 10,664
  - Estimate (2025): 10,394 (−2.5%)

Administrative status
  - Capital of: Sovetsky District, Sovetsky Urban-Type Settlement

Municipal status
  - Municipal district: Sovetsky Municipal District
  - Urban settlement: Sovetsky Urban Settlement
  - Capital of: Sovetsky Municipal District, Sovetsky Urban Settlement
- Time zone: UTC+3 (MSK)
- Postal code: 425400
- OKTMO ID: 88652151051

Sovetsky population
- 2010 Census: 10,464
- 2002 Census: 10,806
- 1989 Census: 11,380
- 1979 Census: 7,750

Sovetsky (Russian: Сове́тский; Meadow Mari: У Роҥго, U Roŋgo) is an urban locality (an urban-type settlement) and the administrative center of Sovetsky District of the Mari El Republic, Russia. As of the 2010 Census, its population was 10,664.

== Administrative and municipal status ==
Within the framework of administrative divisions, Sovetsky serves as the administrative center of Sovetsky District. As an administrative division, the urban-type settlement of Sovetsky, together with two rural localities, is incorporated within Sovetsky District as Sovetsky Urban-Type Settlement (an administrative division of the district). As a municipal division, Sovetsky Urban-Type Settlement is incorporated within Sovetsky Municipal District as Sovetsky Urban Settlement.

== Miscellaneous ==
The largest orphanage in the Mari El Republic is located here, as well as a large TV broadcasting facility with a 350-meter (1,150 ft) guyed mast.
