= Podgornoye, Republic of Bashkortostan =

Podgornoye Подгорное
- Selo
- Location within Bashkortostan Location within Russia
- Coordinates: 52°43′N 56°21′E
- Country: Russia
- Region: Bashkortostan
- District: Kugarchinsky District
- Time zone: UTC+5:00

Podgornoye (Russian: Подгорное) is a rural locality (a selo) and the administrative centre of Chapayevsky Selsoviet, Kugarchinsky District, Bashkortostan, Russia. The population was 566 as of 2010. There are 6 streets.

== Geography ==
Podgornoye is located 29 km west of Mrakovo (the district's administrative centre) by road. Tlyaumbetovo is the nearest rural locality.
