= Podgornoye, Republic of Buryatia =

Podgornoye Подгорное
- Selo
- Location within Republic of Buryatia Location within Russia
- Coordinates: 50°32′N 106°54′E
- Country: Russia
- Region: Republic of Buryatia
- District: Bichursky District
- Time zone: UTC+8:00

Podgornoye (Russian: Подгорное) is a rural locality (a selo) in Bichursky District, Republic of Buryatia, Russia. The population was 28 as of 2010. There is 1 street.

== Geography ==
Podgornoye is located 55 km west of Bichura (the district's administrative centre) by road. Deben is the nearest rural locality.
