= Suslonger =

Suslonger Суслонгер
- Urban-type settlement

Other transcription(s)
  - Meadow Mari: Сӱзлэҥер
- Interactive map of Suslonger
- Location of Suslonger Suslonger (Mari El)
- Coordinates: 56°18′N 48°15′E
- Country: Russia
- Federal subject: Mari El
- Administrative district: Zvenigovsky District
- Urban-type settlementSelsoviet: Suslonger Urban-Type Settlement
- Urban-type settlement status since: 1942

Population (2010 Census)
  - Total: 3,161
  - Estimate (2025): 2,545 (−19.5%)

Administrative status
  - Capital of: Suslonger Urban-Type Settlement

Municipal status
  - Municipal district: Zvenigovsky Municipal District
  - Urban settlement: Suslonger Urban Settlement
  - Capital of: Suslonger Urban Settlement
- Time zone: UTC+3 (MSK)
- Postal code: 425050
- OKTMO ID: 88612184051

Suslonger population
- 2010 Census: 3,161
- 2002 Census: 3,642
- 1989 Census: 4,137
- 1979 Census: 3,655

Suslonger (Russian: Сусло́нгер; Meadow Mari: Сӱзлэҥер, Süzleŋer) is an urban locality (an urban-type settlement) in Zvenigovsky District of the Mari El Republic, Russia. As of the 2010 Census, its population was 3,161.

== History ==
Urban-type settlement status was granted to it in 1942.

== Administrative and municipal status ==
Within the framework of administrative divisions, the urban-type settlement of Suslonger, together with one rural locality (the settlement of Mochalishche), is incorporated within Zvenigovsky District as Suslonger Urban-Type Settlement (an administrative division of the district). As a municipal division, Suslonger Urban-Type Settlement is incorporated within Zvenigovsky Municipal District as Suslonger Urban Settlement.
