= Podgorny, Volgograd Oblast =

Podgorny Подгорный
- Khutor
- Location within Volgograd Oblast Location within Russia
- Coordinates: 49°48′N 43°02′E
- Country: Russia
- Region: Volgograd Oblast
- District: Serafimovichsky District
- Time zone: UTC+4:00

Podgorny (Russian: Подгорный) is a rural locality (a khutor) in Tryasinovskoye Rural Settlement, Serafimovichsky District, Volgograd Oblast, Russia. The population was 33 as of 2010. There are 2 streets.

== Geography ==
Podgorny is located 38 km northeast of Serafimovich (the district's administrative centre) by road. Kepinsky is the nearest rural locality.
