= Privolzhsky, Mari El Republic =

Privolzhsky Приволжский
- Urban-type settlement

Other transcription(s)
  - Meadow Mari: Приволжский
- Interactive map of Privolzhsky
- Location of Privolzhsky Privolzhsky (Mari El)
- Coordinates: 55°58′N 48°25′E
- Country: Russia
- Federal subject: Mari El
- Administrative district: Volzhsky District
- Urban-type settlementSelsoviet: Privolzhsky Urban-Type Settlement
- Founded: 1980
- Elevation: 88 m (289 ft)

Population (2010 Census)
  - Total: 4,159
  - Estimate (2025): 3,637 (−12.6%)

Administrative status
  - Capital of: Privolzhsky Urban-Type Settlement

Municipal status
  - Municipal district: Volzhsky Municipal District
  - Urban settlement: Privolzhsky Urban Settlement
  - Capital of: Privolzhsky Urban Settlement
- Time zone: UTC+3 (MSK)
- Postal code: 425030
- OKTMO ID: 88604159051

Privolzhsky population
- 2010 Census: 4,159
- 2002 Census: 4,161
- 1989 Census: 3,795

Privolzhsky (Russian: Приво́лжский; Meadow Mari: Приволжский) is an urban locality (an urban-type settlement) in Volzhsky District of the Mari El Republic, Russia. As of the 2010 Census, its population was 4,159.

== History ==
It was founded in 1980.

== Administrative and municipal status ==
Within the framework of administrative divisions, the urban-type settlement of Privolzhsky, together with two rural localities, is incorporated within Volzhsky District as Privolzhsky Urban-Type Settlement (an administrative division of the district). As a municipal division, Privolzhsky Urban-Type Settlement is incorporated within Volzhsky Municipal District as Privolzhsky Urban Settlement.
