= Kuzhenersky District =

Kuzhenersky District Куженерский район
- District

Other transcription(s)
  - Meadow Mari: Кужэҥер кундем
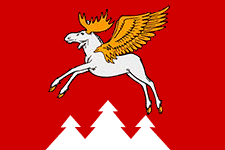
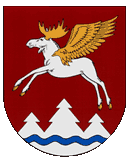
- Flag Coat of arms
- Location of Kuzhenersky District in the Mari El Republic
- Coordinates: 56.758°N 48.737°E
- Country: Russia
- Federal subject: Mari El Republic
- Established: 1935
- Administrative center: Kuzhener

Area
  - Total: 852 km^{2} (329 sq mi)

Population (2010 Census)
  - Total: 14,556
  - Density: 17.1/km^{2} (44.2/sq mi)
  - Urban: 37.0%
  - Rural: 63.0%

Administrative structure
  - Administrative divisions: 1 Urban-type settlements, 8 Rural okrugs
  - Inhabited localities: 1 urban-type settlements, 89 rural localities

Municipal structure
  - Municipally incorporated as: Kuzhenersky Municipal District
  - Municipal divisions: 1 urban settlements, 8 rural settlements
- Time zone: UTC+3 (MSK)
- OKTMO ID: 88620000
- Website: http://www.kuzhener.ru

Population of Kuzhenersky District
- 2010 Census: 14,556
- 2002 Census: 16,210
- 1989 Census: 18,111
- 1979 Census: 18,278

Kuzhenersky District (Russian: Кужене́рский райо́н; Mari: Кужэҥер кундем, Kužeŋer kundem) is an administrative and municipal district (raion), one of the fourteen in the Mari El Republic, Russia. It is located in the east of the republic. The area of the district is 852 square kilometers (329 sq mi). Its administrative center is the urban locality (an urban-type settlement) of Kuzhener. As of the 2010 Census, the total population of the district was 14,556, with the population of Kuzhener accounting for 37.0% of that number.

== Administrative and municipal status ==
Within the framework of administrative divisions, Kuzhenersky District is one of the fourteen in the republic. It is divided into one urban-type settlement (an administrative division with the administrative center in the urban-type settlement (inhabited locality) of Kuzhener) and eight rural okrugs, all of which comprise eighty-nine rural localities. As a municipal division, the district is incorporated as Kuzhenersky Municipal District. Kuzhener Urban-Type Settlement is incorporated into an urban settlement, and the eight rural okrugs are incorporated into eight rural settlements within the municipal district. The urban-type settlement of Kuzhener serves as the administrative center of both the administrative and municipal district.
