= Krasnogorsky, Mari El Republic =

Krasnogorsky Красногорский
- Urban-type settlement

Other transcription(s)
  - Meadow Mari: Лушмара
- Interactive map of Krasnogorsky
- Location of Krasnogorsky Krasnogorsky (Mari El)
- Coordinates: 56°09′N 48°20′E
- Country: Russia
- Federal subject: Mari El
- Administrative district: Zvenigovsky District
- Urban-type settlementSelsoviet: Krasnogorsky Urban-Type Settlement
- Urban-type settlement status since: 1939

Population (2010 Census)
  - Total: 6,699
  - Estimate (2025): 5,978 (−10.8%)

Administrative status
  - Capital of: Krasnogorsky Urban-Type Settlement

Municipal status
  - Municipal district: Zvenigovsky Municipal District
  - Urban settlement: Krasnogorsky Urban Settlement
  - Capital of: Krasnogorsky Urban Settlement
- Time zone: UTC+3 (MSK)
- Postal codes: 425090, 425091
- OKTMO ID: 88612162051

Krasnogorsky population
- 2010 Census: 6,699
- 2002 Census: 7,152
- 1989 Census: 8,660
- 1979 Census: 9,327

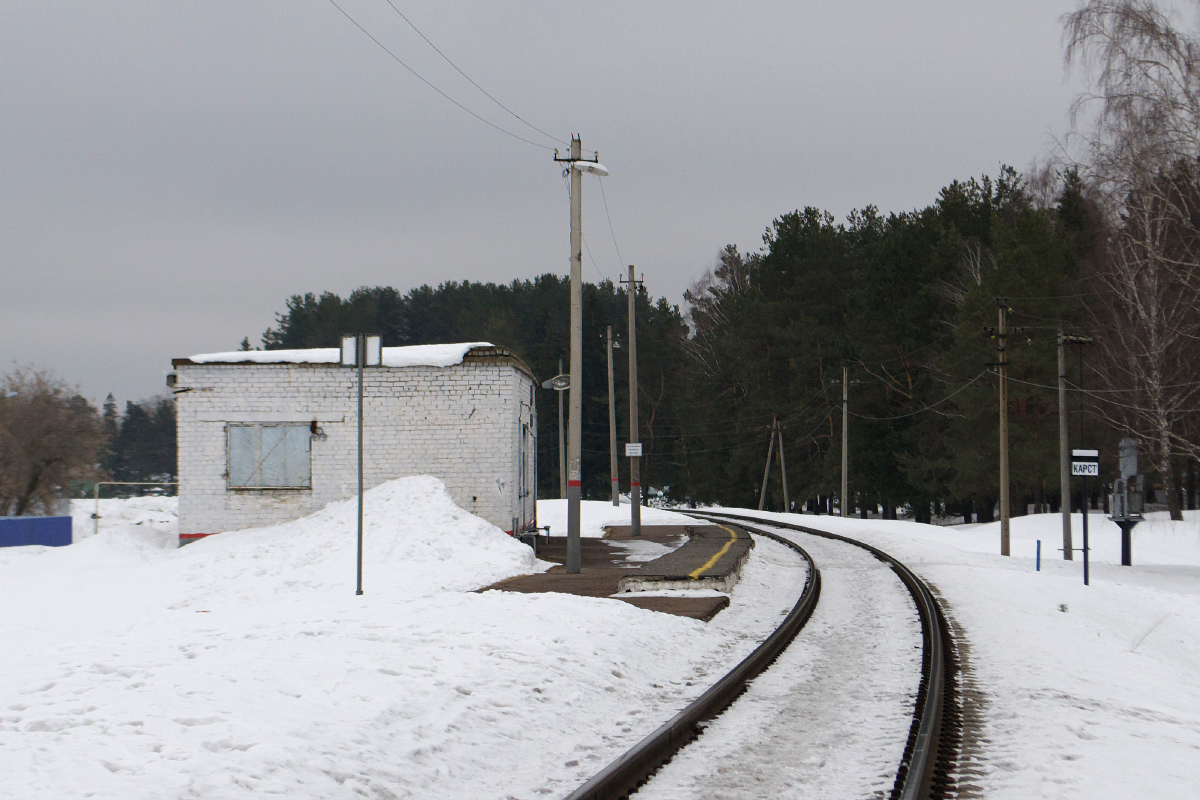
Train station, 2017

Krasnogorsky (Russian: Красного́рский; Meadow Mari: Лушмара, Lušmara) is an urban locality (an urban-type settlement) in Zvenigovsky District of the Mari El Republic, Russia. As of the 2010 Census, its population was 6,699.

== History ==
Urban-type settlement status was granted to it in 1939.

== Administrative and municipal status ==
Within the framework of administrative divisions, the urban-type settlement of Krasnogorsky, together with ten rural localities, is incorporated within Zvenigovsky District as Krasnogorsky Urban-Type Settlement (an administrative division of the district). As a municipal division, Krasnogorsky Urban-Type Settlement is incorporated within Zvenigovsky Municipal District as Krasnogorsky Urban Settlement.
