= Podgorny, Amur Oblast =

Podgorny Подгорный
- Selo
- Location within Amur Oblast Location within Russia
- Coordinates: 51°18′N 128°05′E
- Country: Russia
- Region: Amur Oblast
- District: Svobodnensky District
- Time zone: UTC+9:00

Podgorny (Russian: Подгорный) is a rural locality (a selo) in Novgorodsky Selsoviet of Svobodnensky District, Amur Oblast, Russia. The population was 256 as of 2018. There are 3 streets.

== Geography ==
Podgorny is located 11 km south of Svobodny (the district's administrative centre) by road. Sovetsky is the nearest rural locality.
