= Volzhsky District, Mari El Republic =

Volzhsky District Волжский район (Russian)
- District

Other transcription(s)
  - Meadow Mari: Юлсер кундем
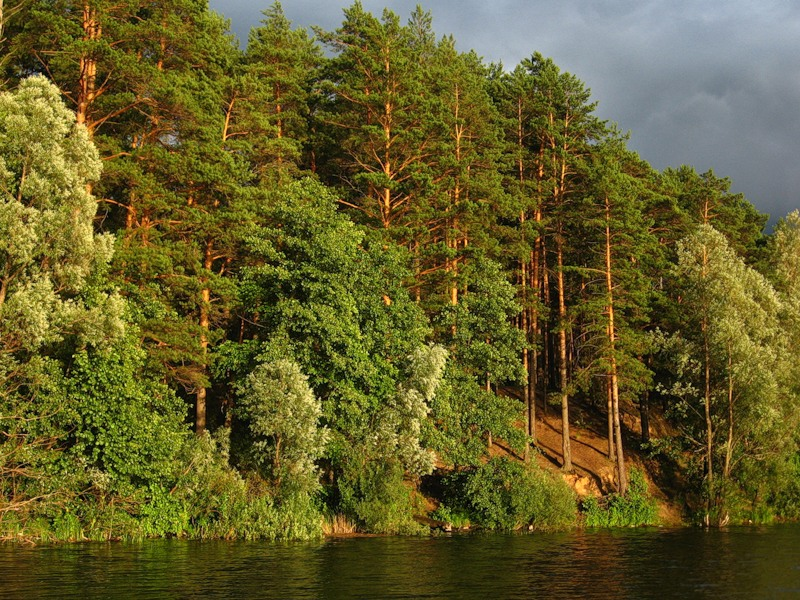
- Lake Yalchik in Volzhsky District

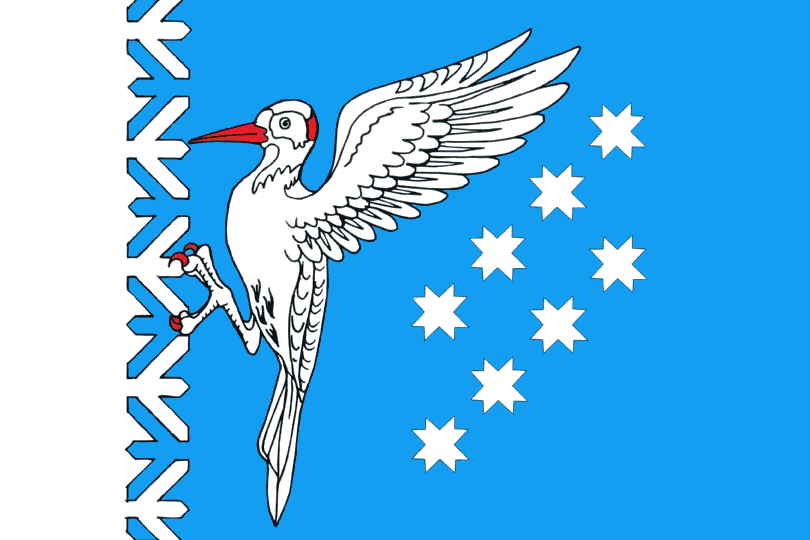
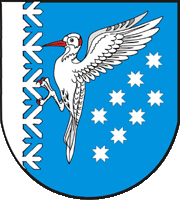
- Flag Coat of arms
- Location of Volzhsky District in the Mari El Republic
- Coordinates: 55°52′N 48°21′E
- Country: Russia
- Federal subject: Mari El Republic
- Established: 26 August 1939
- Administrative center: Volzhsk

Area
  - Total: 942.7 km^{2} (364.0 sq mi)

Population (2010 Census)
  - Total: 23,940
  - Density: 25.40/km^{2} (65.77/sq mi)
  - Urban: 17.4%
  - Rural: 82.6%

Administrative structure
  - Administrative divisions: 1 Urban-type settlements, 7 Rural okrugs
  - Inhabited localities: 1 urban-type settlements, 74 rural localities

Municipal structure
  - Municipally incorporated as: Volzhsky Municipal District
  - Municipal divisions: 1 urban settlements, 7 rural settlements
- Time zone: UTC+3 (MSK)
- OKTMO ID: 88604000
- Website: http://www.rvolzsk.ru

Population of Volzhsky District
- 2010 Census: 23,940
- 2002 Census: 24,006
- 1989 Census: 26,769
- 1979 Census: 27,452

Volzhsky District (Russian: Во́лжский райо́н; Meadow Mari: Юлсер кундем, Julser kundem) is an administrative and municipal district (raion), one of the fourteen in the Mari El Republic, Russia. It is located in the south of the republic. The area of the district is 942.7 square kilometers (364.0 sq mi). Its administrative center is the town of Volzhsk (which is not administratively a part of the district). As of the 2010 Census, the total population of the district was 23,940.

== Administrative and municipal status ==
Within the framework of administrative divisions, Volzhsky District is one of the fourteen in the republic. It is divided into one urban-type settlement (an administrative division with the administrative center in the urban-type settlement (inhabited locality) of Privolzhsky) and seven rural okrugs, all of which comprise seventy-four rural localities. The town of Volzhsk serves as its administrative center, despite being incorporated separately as a town of republic significance—an administrative unit with the status equal to that of the districts.

As a municipal division, the district is incorporated as Volzhsky Municipal District. Privolzhsky Urban-Type Settlement is incorporated into an urban settlement, and the seven rural okrugs are incorporated into seven rural settlements within the municipal district. The town of republic significance of Volzhsk is incorporated separately from the district as Volzhsk Urban Okrug, but serves as the administrative center of the municipal district as well.
