= Zvenigovo =

Town in the Mari El Republic, Russia

Zvenigovo Звенигово
- Town

Other transcription(s)
  - Meadow Mari: Провой
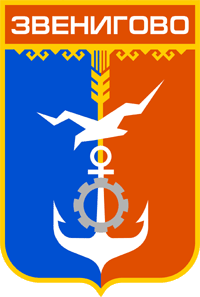
- Coat of arms
- Interactive map of Zvenigovo
- Location of Zvenigovo Zvenigovo (Mari El)
- Coordinates: 55°59′N 48°01′E
- Country: Russia
- Federal subject: Mari El
- Administrative district: Zvenigovsky District
- town of district significanceSelsoviet: Zvenigovo
- Founded: 1860
- Town status since: 1974
- Elevation: 60 m (200 ft)

Population (2010 Census)
  - Total: 11,946
  - Estimate (2023): 10,822 (−9.4%)

Administrative status
  - Capital of: Zvenigovsky District, town of district significance of Zvenigovo

Municipal status
  - Municipal district: Zvenigovsky Municipal District
  - Urban settlement: Zvenigovo Urban Settlement
  - Capital of: Zvenigovsky Municipal District, Zvenigovo Urban Settlement
- Time zone: UTC+3 (MSK)
- Postal code: 425060–425062
- OKTMO ID: 88612101001

Zvenigovo population
- 2010 Census: 11,946
- 2002 Census: 12,722
- 1989 Census: 14,239
- 1979 Census: 12,013

Zvenigovo (Russian: Звени́гово; Meadow Mari: Провой, Provoj) is a town and the administrative center of Zvenigovsky District of the Mari El Republic, Russia, located on the left bank of the Volga River, 90 kilometers (56 mi) south of Yoshkar-Ola, the capital of the republic. As of the 2010 Census, its population was 11,946.

== History ==
It was founded in 1860 and granted urban-type settlement status in 1927 and town status in 1974.

== Administrative and municipal status ==
Within the framework of administrative divisions, Zvenigovo serves as the administrative center of Zvenigovsky District. As an administrative division, it is, together with one rural locality (the village of Chuvash-Otary), incorporated within Zvenigovsky District as the town of district significance of Zvenigovo. As a municipal division, the town of district significance of Zvenigovo is incorporated within Zvenigovsky Municipal District as Zvenigovo Urban Settlement.
