= Kuzhener, Mari El Republic =

Kuzhener Куженер
- Urban-type settlement

Other transcription(s)
  - Meadow Mari: Кужэҥер
- Interactive map of Kuzhener
- Location of Kuzhener Kuzhener (Mari El)
- Coordinates: 56°49′N 48°54′E
- Country: Russia
- Federal subject: Mari El
- Administrative district: Kuzhenersky District
- Urban-type settlementSelsoviet: Kuzhener Urban-Type Settlement

Population (2010 Census)
  - Total: 5,384
  - Estimate (2025): 4,647 (−13.7%)

Administrative status
  - Capital of: Kuzhenersky District, Kuzhener Urban-Type Settlement

Municipal status
  - Municipal district: Kuzhenersky Municipal District
  - Urban settlement: Kuzhener Urban Settlement
  - Capital of: Kuzhenersky Municipal District, Kuzhener Urban Settlement
- Time zone: UTC+3 (MSK)
- Postal code: 425550
- OKTMO ID: 88620151051

Kuzhener population
- 2010 Census: 5,384
- 2002 Census: 5,869
- 1989 Census: 6,200
- 1979 Census: 4,289

Kuzhener (Russian: Кужене́р; Meadow Mari: Кужэҥер, Kužeŋer) is an urban locality (an urban-type settlement) and the administrative center of Kuzhenersky District of the Mari El Republic, Russia. As of the 2010 Census, its population was 5,384.

== Administrative and municipal status ==
Within the framework of administrative divisions, Kuzhener serves as the administrative center of Kuzhenersky District. As an administrative division, the urban-type settlement of Kuzhener, together with three rural localities, is incorporated within Kuzhenersky District as Kuzhener Urban-Type Settlement (an administrative division of the district). As a municipal division, Kuzhener Urban-Type Settlement is incorporated within Kuzhenersky Municipal District as Kuzhener Urban Settlement.
