= Mari-Tureksky District =

Mari-Tureksky District Мари-Турекский район (Russian)
- District

Other transcription(s)
  - Meadow Mari: Марий Тӱрек кундем
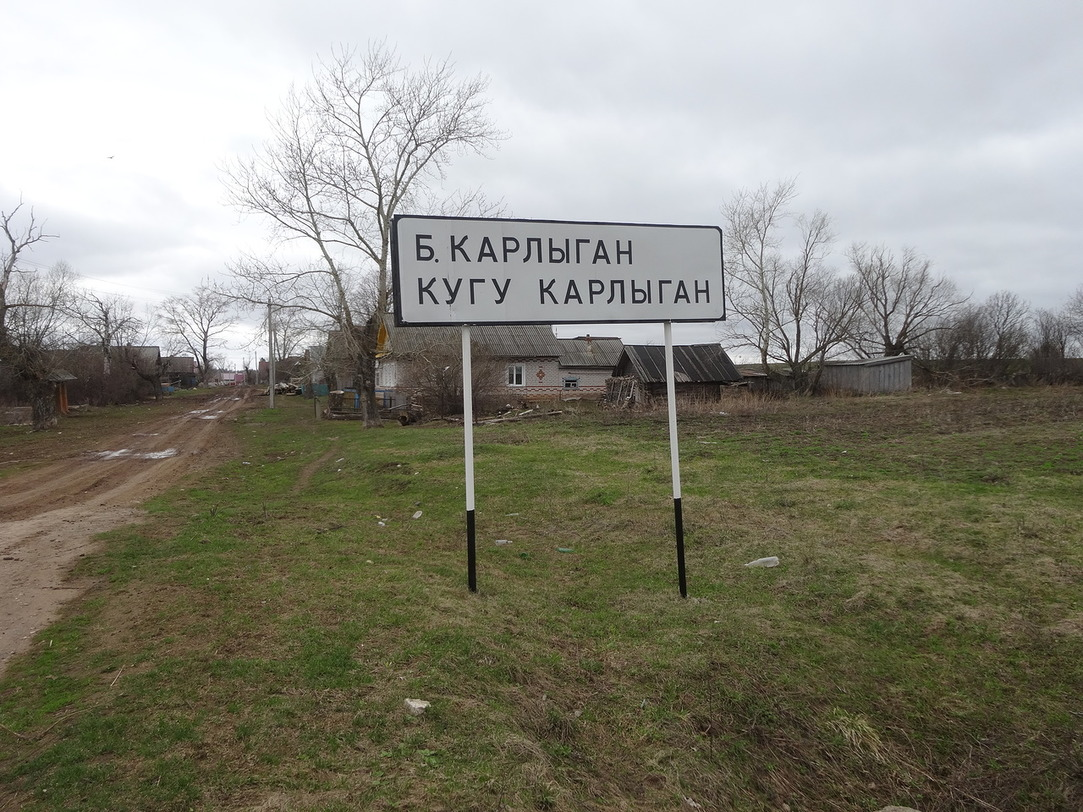
- Landscape in Mari-Tureksky District

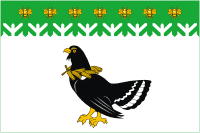
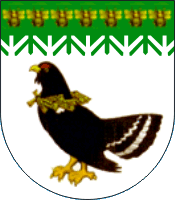
- Flag Coat of arms
- Location of Mari-Tureksky District in the Mari El Republic
- Coordinates: 56.751°N 49.282°E
- Country: Russia
- Federal subject: Mari El Republic
- Established: 28 August 1924
- Administrative center: Mari-Turek

Area
  - Total: 1,500 km^{2} (580 sq mi)

Population (2010 Census)
  - Total: 23,155
  - Density: 15/km^{2} (40/sq mi)
  - Urban: 22.3%
  - Rural: 77.7%

Administrative structure
  - Administrative divisions: 1 Urban-type settlements, 5 Rural okrugs
  - Inhabited localities: 1 urban-type settlements, 119 rural localities

Municipal structure
  - Municipally incorporated as: Mari-Tureksky Municipal District
  - Municipal divisions: 1 urban settlements, 5 rural settlements
- Time zone: UTC+3 (MSK)
- OKTMO ID: 88624000
- Website: https://www.mari-tyrek.ru

Population of Mari-Tureksky District
- 2010 Census: 23,155
- 2002 Census: 25,577
- 1989 Census: 27,698
- 1979 Census: 29,901

Mari-Tureksky District (Russian: Мари́-Туре́кский райо́н; Meadow Mari: Марий Тӱрек кундем, Marij Türek kundem) is an administrative and municipal district (raion), one of the fourteen in the Mari El Republic, Russia. It is located in the east of the republic. The area of the district is 1,500 square kilometers (580 sq mi). Its administrative center is the urban locality (an urban-type settlement) of Mari-Turek. As of the 2010 Census, the total population of the district was 23,155, with the population of Mari-Turek accounting for 22.3% of that number.

== Administrative and municipal status ==
Within the framework of administrative divisions, Mari-Tureksky District is one of the fourteen in the republic. It is divided into one urban-type settlement (an administrative division with the administrative center in the urban-type settlement (inhabited locality) of Mari-Turek) and 5 rural okrugs, all of which comprise 119 rural localities. As a municipal division, the district is incorporated as Mari-Tureksky Municipal District. Mari-Turek Urban-Type Settlement is incorporated into an urban settlement, and the five rural okrugs are incorporated into five rural settlements within the municipal district. The urban-type settlement of Mari-Turek serves as the administrative center of both the administrative and municipal district.

== Notable residents ==
- Vyacheslav Kislitsyn (born 1948), President of Mari El 1997–2001, born in Kosolapovo
