= Morki =

Morki Морки
- Urban-type settlement

Other transcription(s)
  - Meadow Mari: Морко
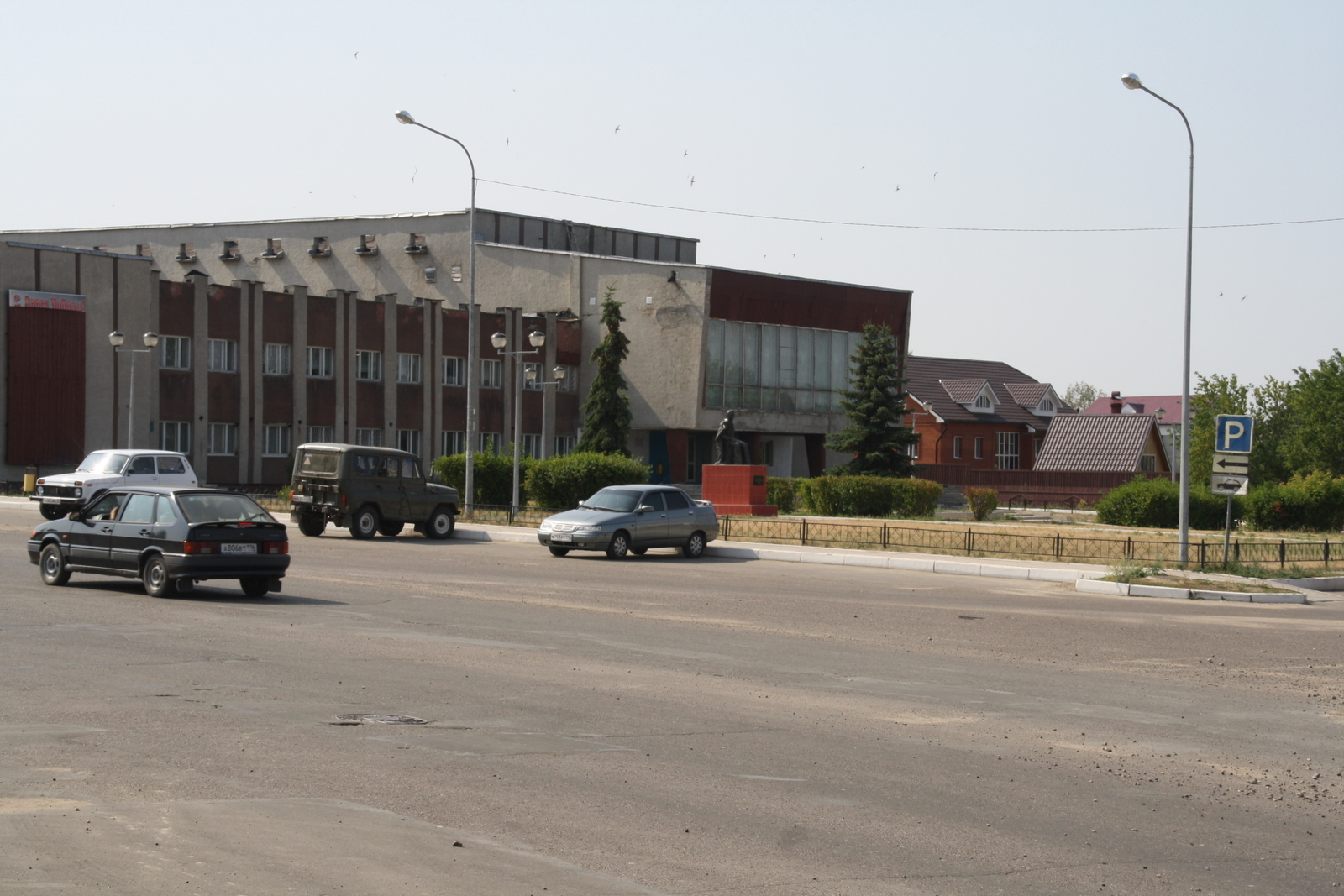
- Culture center in Morki
- Interactive map of Morki
- Location of Morki Morki (Mari El)
- Coordinates: 56°26′N 48°59′E
- Country: Russia
- Federal subject: Mari El
- Administrative district: Morkinsky District
- Urban-type settlementSelsoviet: Morki Urban-Type Settlement
- Founded: 1678
- Elevation: 112 m (367 ft)

Population (2010 Census)
  - Total: 9,914
  - Estimate (2025): 8,530 (−14%)

Administrative status
  - Capital of: Morkinsky District, Morki Urban-Type Settlement

Municipal status
  - Municipal district: Morkinsky Municipal District
  - Urban settlement: Morki Urban Settlement
  - Capital of: Morkinsky Municipal District, Morki Urban Settlement
- Time zone: UTC+3 (MSK)
- Postal codes: 425120, 425122, 425159
- OKTMO ID: 88632151051

Morki population
- 2010 Census: 9,914
- 2002 Census: 9,686
- 1989 Census: 9,612
- 1979 Census: 7,459

Morki (Russian: Морки́; Meadow Mari: Морко, Morko) is an urban locality (an urban-type settlement) and the administrative center of Morkinsky District of the Mari El Republic, Russia. As of the 2010 Census, its population was 9,914.

== Administrative and municipal status ==
Within the framework of administrative divisions, Morki serves as the administrative center of Morkinsky District. As an administrative division, the urban-type settlement of Morki, together with twenty-four rural localities, is incorporated within Morkinsky District as Morki Urban-Type Settlement (an administrative division of the district). As a municipal division, Morki Urban-Type Settlement is incorporated within Morkinsky Municipal District as Morki Urban Settlement.
