= Orshanka, Orshansky District, Mari El Republic =

Orshanka Оршанка
- Urban-type settlement

Other transcription(s)
  - Meadow Mari: Ӧрша
- Interactive map of Orshanka
- Location of Orshanka Orshanka (Mari El)
- Coordinates: 56°54′N 47°55′E
- Country: Russia
- Federal subject: Mari El
- Administrative district: Orshansky District
- Urban-type settlementSelsoviet: Orshanka Urban-Type Settlement
- Founded: 1820

Population (2010 Census)
  - Total: 6,589
  - Estimate (2025): 5,414 (−17.8%)

Administrative status
  - Capital of: Orshansky District, Orshanka Urban-Type Settlement

Municipal status
  - Municipal district: Orshansky Municipal District
  - Urban settlement: Orshanka Urban Settlement
  - Capital of: Orshansky Municipal District, Orshanka Urban Settlement
- Time zone: UTC+3 (MSK)
- Postal codes: 425250, 425258
- OKTMO ID: 88640151051

Orshanka population
- 2010 Census: 6,589
- 2002 Census: 6,834
- 1989 Census: 6,951
- 1979 Census: 4,321

Orshanka (Russian: Орша́нка; Meadow Mari: Ӧрша, Örša) is an urban locality (an urban-type settlement) and the administrative center of Orshansky District of the Mari El Republic, Russia. As of the 2010 Census, its population was 6,589.

== Administrative and municipal status ==
Within the framework of administrative divisions, Orshanka serves as the administrative center of Orshansky District. As an administrative division, the urban-type settlement of Orshanka is incorporated within Orshansky District as Orshanka Urban-Type Settlement (an administrative division of the district). As a municipal division, Orshanka Urban-Type Settlement is incorporated within Orshansky Municipal District as Orshanka Urban Settlement.
