= Yurinsky District =

Yurinsky District Юринский район (Russian)
- District

Other transcription(s)
  - Hill Mari: Йӱрнӹ кымдем
  - Meadow Mari: Йӱрнӧ кундем
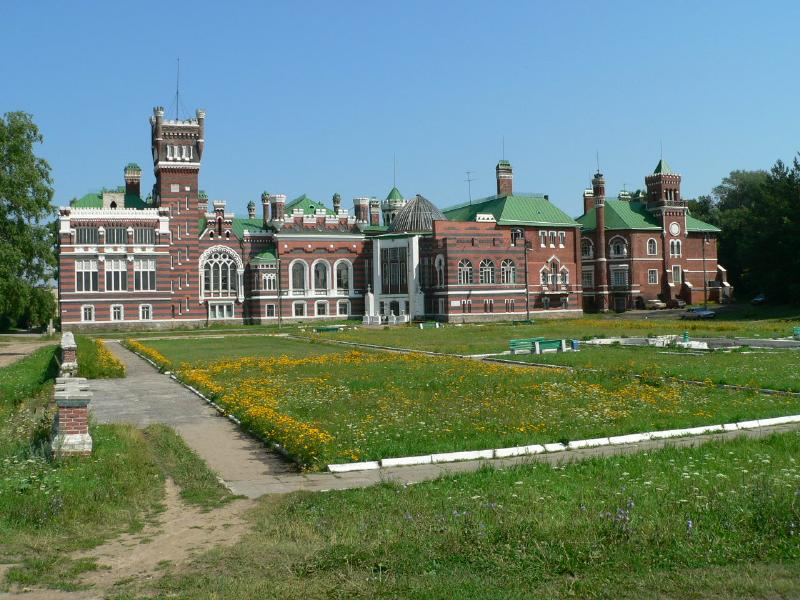
- Sheremetev castle, Yurinsky District

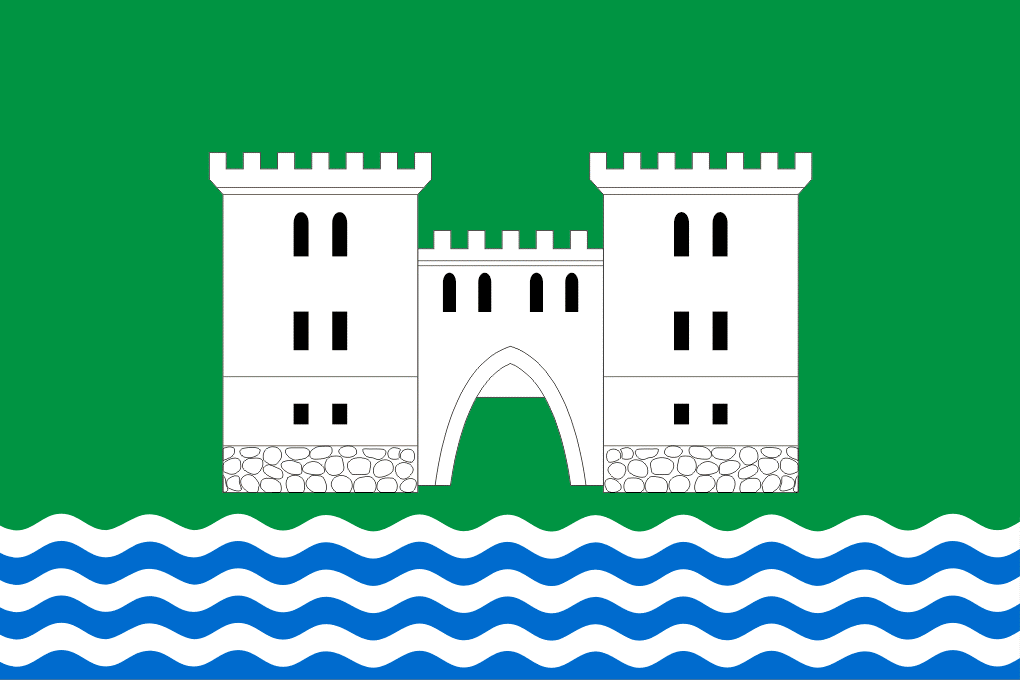
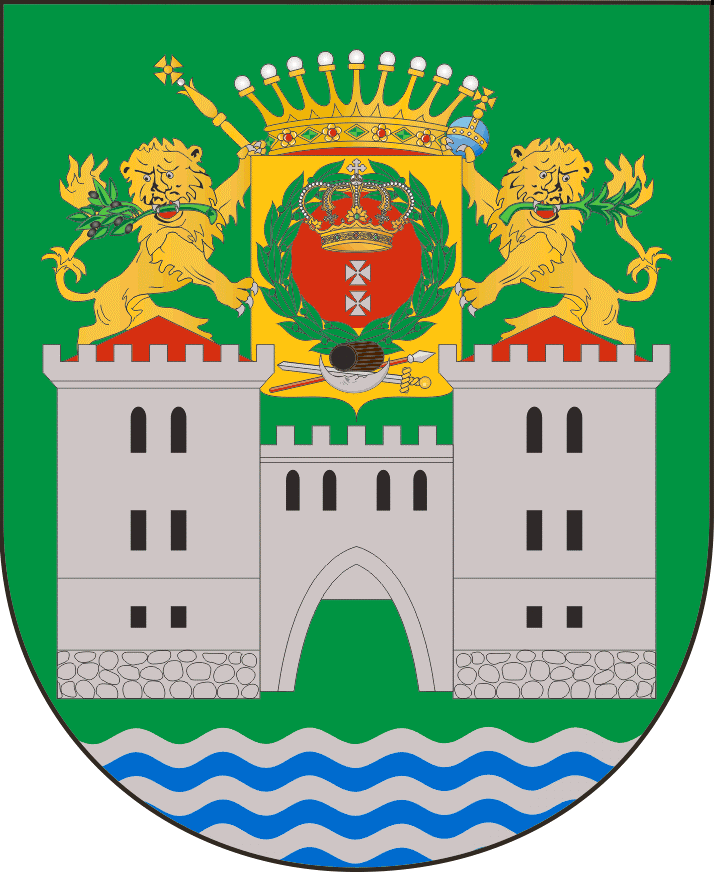
- Flag Coat of arms
- Location of Yurinsky District in the Mari El Republic
- Coordinates: 56.536°N 45.459°E
- Country: Russia
- Federal subject: Mari El Republic
- Established: 1924
- Administrative center: Yurino

Area
  - Total: 2,040 km^{2} (790 sq mi)

Population (2010 Census)
  - Total: 8,758
  - Density: 4.29/km^{2} (11.1/sq mi)
  - Urban: 39.6%
  - Rural: 60.4%

Administrative structure
  - Administrative divisions: 1 Urban-type settlements, 5 Rural okrugs
  - Inhabited localities: 1 urban-type settlements, 42 rural localities

Municipal structure
  - Municipally incorporated as: Yurinsky Municipal District
  - Municipal divisions: 1 urban settlements, 5 rural settlements
- Time zone: UTC+3 (MSK)
- OKTMO ID: 88656000
- Website: http://portal.mari.ru/jurino

Population of Yurinsky District
- 2010 Census: 8,758
- 2002 Census: 11,487
- 1989 Census: 14,561
- 1979 Census: 19,272

Yurinsky District (Russian: Ю́ринский райо́н; Hill Mari: Йӱрнӹ кымдем, Jürnÿ kymdem; Meadow Mari: Йӱрнӧ кундем, Jürnö kundem) is an administrative and municipal district (raion), one of the fourteen in the Mari El Republic, Russia. It is located in the west of the republic. The area of the district is 2,040 square kilometers (790 sq mi). Its administrative center is the urban locality (an urban-type settlement) of Yurino. As of the 2010 Census, the total population of the district was 8,758, with the population of Yurino accounting for 39.6% of that number.

== Administrative and municipal status ==
Within the framework of administrative divisions, Yurinsky District is one of the fourteen in the republic. It is divided into one urban-type settlement (an administrative division with the administrative center in the urban-type settlement (inhabited locality) of Yurino) and five rural okrugs, all of which comprise forty-two rural localities. As a municipal division, the district is incorporated as Yurinsky Municipal District. Yurino Urban-Type Settlement is incorporated into an urban settlement, and the five rural okrugs are incorporated into five rural settlements within the municipal district. The urban-type settlement of Yurino serves as the administrative center of both the administrative and municipal district.
