= Mari-Turek =

Mari-Turek Мари-Турек
- Urban-type settlement

Other transcription(s)
  - Meadow Mari: Марий Тӱрек
- Interactive map of Mari-Turek
- Location of Mari-Turek Mari-Turek (Mari El)
- Coordinates: 56°48′N 49°37′E
- Country: Russia
- Federal subject: Mari El
- Administrative district: Mari-Tureksky District
- Urban-type settlementSelsoviet: Mari-Turek Urban-Type Settlement
- Founded: 1719

Population (2010 Census)
  - Total: 5,164
  - Estimate (2025): 4,213 (−18.4%)

Administrative status
  - Capital of: Mari-Tureksky District, Mari-Turek Urban-Type Settlement

Municipal status
  - Municipal district: Mari-Tureksky Municipal District
  - Urban settlement: Mari-Turek Urban Settlement
  - Capital of: Mari-Tureksky Municipal District, Mari-Turek Urban Settlement
- Time zone: UTC+3 (MSK)
- Postal code: 425500
- OKTMO ID: 88624151051

Mari-Turek population
- 2010 Census: 5,164
- 2002 Census: 5,973
- 1989 Census: 6,098
- 1979 Census: 4,942

Mari-Turek (Russian: Мари́-Туре́к; Meadow Mari: Марий Тӱрек, Marij Türek) is an urban locality (an urban-type settlement) and the administrative center of Mari-Tureksky District of the Mari El Republic, Russia. As of the 2010 Census, its population was 5,164.

== Administrative and municipal status ==
Within the framework of administrative divisions, Mari-Turek serves as the administrative center of Mari-Tureksky District. As an administrative division, the urban-type settlement of Mari-Turek, together with twenty-nine rural localities, is incorporated within Mari-Tureksky District as Mari-Turek Urban-Type Settlement (an administrative division of the district). As a municipal division, Mari-Turek Urban-Type Settlement is incorporated within Mari-Tureksky Municipal District as Mari-Turek Urban Settlement.
