= Mari El constituency =

Russian legislative constituency

Mari El single-member constituency
- Constituency of the Russian State Duma

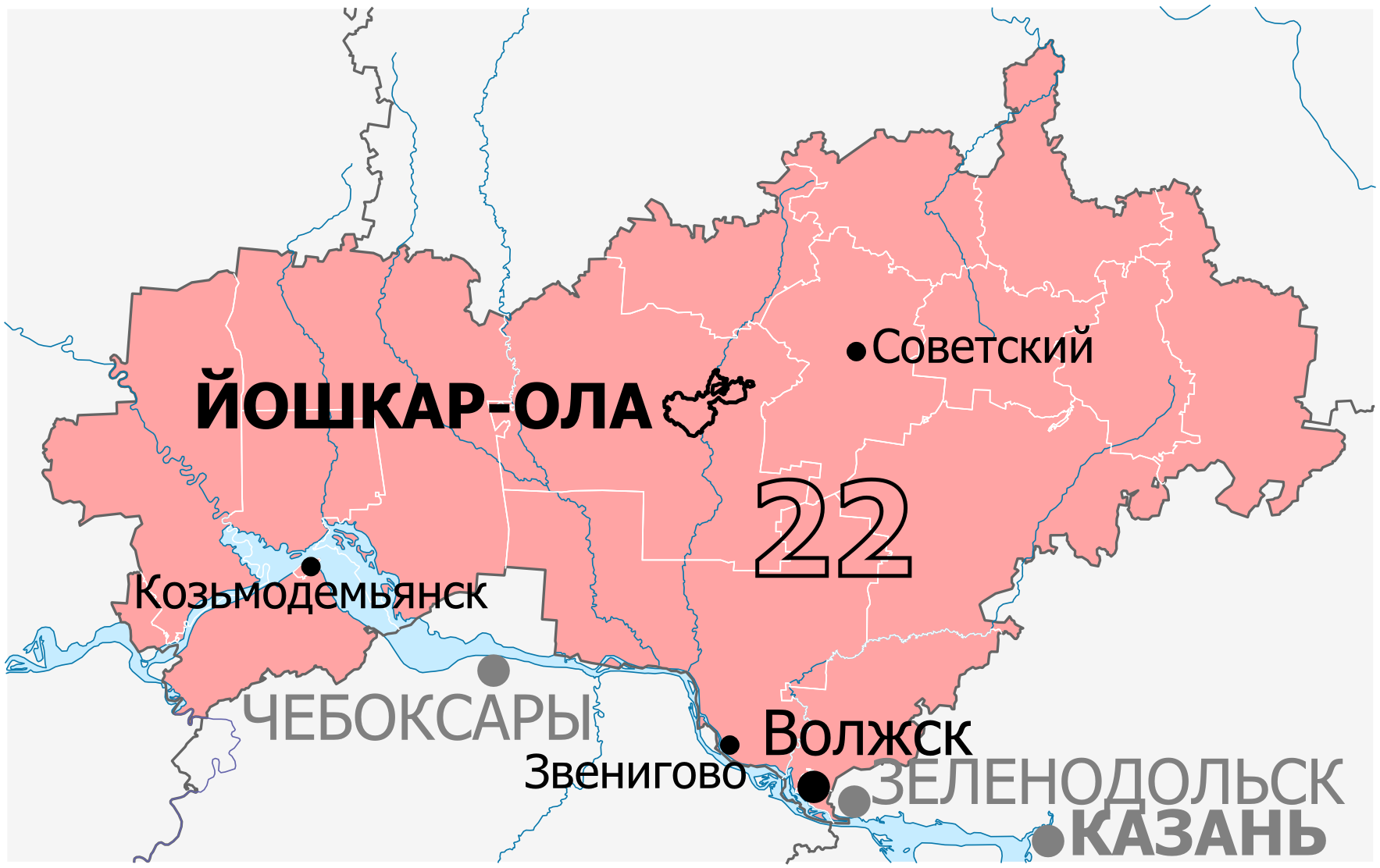
- Deputy: Sergey Kazankov; Communist Party
- Federal subject: Mari El Republic
- Districts: Gornomariysky, Kilemarsky, Kozmodemyansk, Kuzhenersky, Mari-Tureksky, Medvedevsky, Morkinsky, Novotoryalsky, Orshansky, Paranginsky, Sernursky, Sovetsky, Volzhsk, Volzhsky, Yoshkar-Ola, Yurinsky, Zvenigovsky
- Voters: 518,187 (2026)

The Mari El constituency (No.27 (Note: No.19 in 1993-1995 and in 2003-2007, No.18 in 1995-2003, No.22 in 2016–2026)) is a Russian legislative constituency in Mari El. The constituency encompasses the entire territory of Mari El.

The constituency has been represented since 2016 by Communist Sergey Kazankov, an agriculture executive and son of former State Duma member Ivan Kazankov.

== Boundaries ==
1993–2007, 2016–present: Gornomariysky District, Kilemarsky District, Kozmodemyansk, Kuzhenersky District, Mari-Tureksky District, Medvedevsky District, Morkinsky District, Novotoryalsky District, Orshansky District, Paranginsky District, Sernursky District, Sovetsky District, Volzhsk, Volzhsky District, Yoshkar-Ola, Yurinsky District, Zvenigovsky District
The constituency has been covering the entirety of Mari El since its initial creation in 1993.

== Members elected ==
Election	Member	Party
1993	Anatoly Popov	Party of Russian Unity and Accord
1995	Nikolay Polyakov	Agrarian Party
1999	Ivan Kazankov	Independent
2003	Valery Komissarov	United Russia
2007	Proportional representation - no election by constituency	
2011	Proportional representation - no election by constituency	
2016	Sergey Kazankov	Communist Party
2021	Sergey Kazankov	Communist Party
2026	Sergey Kazankov	Communist Party

== Election results ==
=== 1993 ===
==== Declared candidates ====
Results by district: Anatoly Popov Lyudmila Ivanova Against all candidates

- Lyudmila Ivanova (Independent), Member of Supreme Council of Mari El (1990–present), arts college director
- Anatoly Popov (PRES), Member of Supreme Council of Mari El (1993–present), shoe factory director, 1991 presidential candidate
- Valery Trakhtenberg (Independent), Mari Polytechnic Institute department of design automation head
- Igor Vinokurov (Independent), investment banker, retired KGB captain

==== Results ====
Summary of the 12 December 1993 Russian legislative election in the Mari El constituency
Candidate	Party	Votes	%
Anatoly Popov	Party of Russian Unity and Accord	85,593	27.78%
Lyudmila Ivanova	Independent	60,158	19.53%
Igor Vinokurov	Independent	45,730	14.84%
Valery Trakhtenberg	Independent	37,261	12.09%
against all		60,449	19.62%
invalid ballots		18,888	6.13%
Total		308,079	100%
Registered voters/turnout		537,282	57.34%

=== 1995 ===
==== Declared candidates ====
- Gennady Grigoryev (Kedr), former Member of Supreme Council of Mari El (1990–1994), Chief Sanitary Doctor of Mari El (1991–present)
- Aleksandr Kazimov (PGL), Member of State Assembly of the Mari El Republic (1994–present), Mari language researcher, 1991 presidential candidate
- Valery Loskutov (My Fatherland), prorector of Mari State Pedagogical Institute (1992–present)
- Leonid Markelov (LDPR), attorney, retired colonel of justice
- Gennady Oshchepkov (Independent), rector of Mari State Technical University (1972–present)
- Nikolay Polyakov (APR), Member of State Assembly of the Mari El Republic (1994–present), kolkhoz chairman
- Anatoly Popov (BIR), incumbent Member of State Duma (1994–present)

==== Results ====
Summary of the 17 December 1995 Russian legislative election in the Mari El constituency
Candidate	Party	Votes	%
Nikolay Polyakov	Agrarian Party	96,831	26.35%
Leonid Markelov	Liberal Democratic Party	69,927	19.03%
Anatoly Popov (incumbent)	Ivan Rybkin Bloc	43,808	11.92%
Gennady Grigoryev	Kedr	39,348	10.71%
Aleksandr Kazimov	Pamfilova–Gurov–Lysenko	25,323	6.89%
Gennady Oshchepkov	Independent	24,663	6.71%
Valery Loskutov	My Fatherland	21,867	5.95%
against all		37,904	10.32%
Total		367,464	100%

=== 1999 ===
==== Declared candidates ====
- Viktor Bogdan (Independent), chief of Yoshkar-Ola organization of the Gorky Railway Kazan Division (1992–present)
- Vasily Grigoryev (For Civil Dignity), Deputy Minister of Internal Affairs of Mari El (1994–present)
- Ivan Kazankov (Independent), Member of State Assembly of the Mari El Republic (1996–present), sovkhoz director
- Ivan Kononov (Independent), industrial executive
- Vitaly Lezhanin (Nikolayev–Fyodorov Bloc), military base deputy commander, RVSN podpolkovnik
- Leonid Loskutov (Independent), nonprofit chairman
- Vladimir Maksimov (Independent), business association executive
- Leonid Markelov (Independent), Member of State Duma (1996–present), 1996–97 presidential candidate
- Vladimir Mikheyev (Independent), former Member of Supreme Council of Mari El (1990–1994)
- Vyacheslav Paydoverov (Independent), Member of State Assembly of the Mari El Republic (1996–present), lawyer
- Nikolay Polyakov (Independent), incumbent Member of State Duma (1996–present)
- Valery Odintsov (Independent), nonprofit staffer
- Aleksey Popov (SPR), Federal Treasury Regional Office staffer, son of former State Duma member Anatoly Popov
- Vitaly Trubitsyn (Independent), businessman
- Viktor Vasilyev (Independent), Member of State Assembly of the Mari El Republic (1996–present), agriculture businessman

==== Withdrawn candidates ====
- Valentin Matveyev (Independent), zoology professor

==== Failed to qualify ====
- Vadim Menzurov (Independent)
- Aleksandr Solovyov (DN), printing house director

==== Did not file ====
- Stanislav Golovin (Independent), former Member of Supreme Council of Mari El (1990–1994)
- Ippolit Lobanov (Independent), writer, journalist
- Aleksandr Mironov (Independent), Member of State Assembly of the Mari El Republic (1996–present)
- Vladimir Mukhametzyanov (Independent)
- Valery Odintsov (Independent), nonprofit staffer
- Sergey Panfilov (Independent), Head of Volzhsky District
- Vasily Pekteyev (Independent), theatre producer
- Aidar Sharafetdinov (Nur), businessman
- Albert Shvetsov (Independent)
- Andrei Skoch (Independent), businessman (ran in the Novy Oskol constituency)
- Anatoliy Smirnov (Independent), Chief of Staff to the President of Mari El (1997–present)
- Vladimir Strelnikov (Independent)
- Sergey Svinin (Independent), Member of State Duma (1996–present)
- Valentin Vinokurov (Independent)
- Nikolay Zagaynov (Independent), attorney

==== Results ====
Summary of the 19 December 1999 Russian legislative election in the Mari El constituency
Candidate	Party	Votes	%
Ivan Kazankov	Independent	136,358	37.75%
Leonid Markelov	Independent	91,893	25.44%
Viktor Bogdan	Independent	25,285	7.00%
Viktor Vasilyev	Independent	23,845	6.60%
Vyacheslav Paydoverov	Independent	22,690	6.28%
Vasily Grigoryev	For Civil Dignity	12,365	3.42%
Nikolay Polyakov (incumbent)	Independent	7,066	1.96%
Vladimir Mikheyev	Independent	3,048	0.84%
Vitaly Lezhanin	Andrey Nikolayev and Svyatoslav Fyodorov Bloc	2,645	0.73%
Aleksey Popov	Socialist Party of Russia	1,992	0.55%
Leonid Loskutov	Independent	1,864	0.52%
Vladimir Maskimov	Independent	1,420	0.39%
Vitaly Trubitsin	Independent	1,412	0.39%
Gennady Khrolenko	Independent	1,069	0.30%
against all		20,853	5.77%
Total		361,242	100%

=== 2003 ===
==== Declared candidates ====
- Yevgeny Bochkarev (Independent), Member of State Assembly of the Mari El Republic (2000–present), medical businessman
- Rezeda Gilmanova (ORP Rus'), insurance agent
- Vladimir Karpochev (Independent), breeding farm director
- Ivan Kazankov (CPRF), incumbent Member of State Duma (2000–present)
- Vyacheslav Kislitsyn (Independent), former President of Mari El (1997–2001)
- Valery Komissarov (United Russia), Member of State Duma (2000–present)
- Igor Kudryavtsev (APR), farmer
- Namik Muradov (VR–ES), marketing businessman
- Nikolay Svistunov (Independent), Member of State Assembly of the Mari El Republic (2000–present), Mayor of Volzhsk (1996–present)

==== Failed to qualify ====
- Tatyana Aldrova (Independent), Member of State Assembly of the Mari El Republic (2000–present), physician
- Gennady Grigoryev (The Greens), former Member of Supreme Council of Mari El (1990–1994), Chief Sanitary Doctor of Mari El (1991–present), 1995 candidate for this seat
- Viktor Nikolayev (NPS RF), former Minister of Culture of Mari El (1992–1997)
- Valery Odintsov (Independent), lawyer, 1999 candidate for this seat
- Anatoly Popov (Independent), former Member of State Duma (1994–1995)
- Arkady Timofeyev (LDPR), pensioner
- Nikolay Zagaynov (Independent), attorney, 1999 candidate for this seat
- Yevgeny Zhelonkin (PME), construction specialist

==== Results ====
Summary of the 7 December 2003 Russian legislative election in the Mari El constituency
Candidate	Party	Votes	%
Valery Komissarov	United Russia	141,583	44.17%
Ivan Kazankov (incumbent)	Communist Party	61,013	19.03%
Igor Kudryavtsev	Agrarian Party	22,829	7.12%
Vyacheslav Kislitsyn	Independent	19,024	5.94%
Yevgeny Bochkarev	Democratic Party	13,940	4.35%
Nikolay Svistunov	Independent	11,458	3.57%
Rezeda Gilmanova	United Russian Party Rus'	4,187	1.31%
Vladimir Karpochev	Independent	3,053	0.95%
Namik Muradov	Great Russia – Eurasian Union	1,174	0.37%
against all		36,920	11.52%
Total		320,637	100%

=== 2016 ===
==== Declared candidates ====
- Albert Fedorov (LDPR), Member of Medvedevo Assembly of Deputies (2014–present), utilities executive
- Natalia Glushchenko (A Just Russia), aide to State Duma member Anatoly Aksakov
- Oleg Kazakov (Independent), retired militsiya officer
- Sergey Kazankov (CPRF), Member of State Assembly of the Mari El Republic (2000–present), agriculture businessman, son of former State Duma member Ivan Kazankov
- Denis Shparber (CPCR), individual entrepreneur
- Andrey Smyshlyayev (GP), chairman of the party regional office
- Yekaterina Ulanova (Yabloko), party activist, poet
- Larisa Yakovleva (United Russia), Member of State Duma (2013–present)
- Roman Zolotukhin (Rodina), former Member of Yoshkar-Ola City Assembly (2004–2009), security businessman
- Yury Zonov (The Greens), former Member of Yoshkar-Ola City Assembly (2004–2009), businessman

==== Withdrawn candidates ====
- Yury Shmelyov (Independent), fire train head

==== Did not file ====
- Grigory Petrov-Chotkar (Independent), Member of Maskanur Assembly of Deputies (2014–present), farmer

==== Declined ====
- Boris Gerasimov (United Russia), Member of State Assembly of the Mari El Republic (2014–present), construction businessman (lost the primary)
- Viktor Kidyayev (United Russia), Member of State Duma (2009–present), Chairman of the Duma Committee on the Federation and Local Government (2011–present) (won the primary, ran on the party list)
- Aleksandr Smirnov (United Russia), Member of State Assembly of the Mari El Republic (2014–present), boarding school deputy vice principal (lost the primary)
- Svetlana Solntseva (United Russia), First Deputy Premier of Mari El (2015–present), former Senator from Mari El (2015) (lost the primary, ran on the party list)

==== Results ====
Summary of the 18 September 2016 Russian legislative election in the Mari El constituency
Candidate	Party	Votes	%
Sergey Kazankov	Communist Party	133,447	46.23%
Larisa Yakovleva	United Russia	107,112	37.11%
Oleg Kazakov	Independent	12,145	4.21%
Albert Fedorov	Liberal Democratic Party	10,162	3.52%
Natalia Glushchenko	A Just Russia	9,284	3.22%
Roman Zolotukhin	Rodina	2,673	0.93%
Yekaterina Ulanova	Yabloko	2,603	0.90%
Yury Zonov	The Greens	2,061	0.71%
Denis Shparber	Communists of Russia	1,740	0.60%
Andrey Smyshlyayev	Civic Platform	1,533	0.53%
Total		288,630	100%

=== 2021 ===
Results by district: Sergey Kazankov Vladimir Kozhanov

==== Declared candidates ====
- Natalia Glushchenko (SR–ZP), Member of State Assembly of the Mari El Republic (2019–present), 2016 candidate for this seat, 2017 head candidate
- Sergey Hartvik (GP), forestry businessman
- Ivan Kazankov (CPCR), mixing operator
- Sergey Kazankov (CPRF), incumbent Member of State Duma (2016–present)
- Vladimir Kozhanov (Independent), Member of State Assembly of the Mari El Republic (2001–2019, 2019–present), agriculture businessman
- Ilya Kulalayev (New People), Member of Yoshkar-Ola Assembly of Deputies (2020–present), power grid executive
- Vladimir Rovensky (Party of Growth), attorney
- Aleksey Sherstobitov (LDPR), Member of Medvedevsky District Assembly of Deputies (2019–present)
- Andrey Smyshlyayev (Rodina), businessman, 2016 GP candidate for this seat, 2017 GP head candidate
- Valentina Zlobina (RPPSS), former Deputy Chairwoman of the State Assembly of the Mari El Republic (2004–2009), 2017 head candidate

==== Withdrawn candidates ====
- Anton Malyshev (United Russia), individual entrepreneur

==== Failed to qualify ====
- Kirill Panko (Independent), lawyer, 2014 Vologda Oblast and 2017 Yaroslavl Oblast CPCR gubernatorial candidate

==== Results ====
Summary of the 17-19 September 2021 Russian legislative election in the Mari El constituency
Candidate	Party	Votes	%
Sergey Kazankov (incumbent)	Communist Party	122,851	50.36%
Vladimir Kozhanov	Independent	41,961	17.20%
Natalia Glushchenko	A Just Russia — For Truth	18,463	7.57%
Ivan Kazankov	Communists of Russia	16,740	6.86%
Aleksey Sherstobitov	Liberal Democratic Party	8,502	3.49%
Valentina Zlobina	Party of Pensioners	8,165	3.35%
Ilya Kulalayev	New People	7,838	3.21%
Andrey Smyshlyayev	Rodina	4,966	2.04%
Sergey Hartvik	Civic Platform	2,336	0.96%
Vladimir Rovensky	Party of Growth	1,498	0.61%
Total		243,922	100%

=== 2026 ===
==== Declared candidates ====
- Andrey Gavrilov (New People), attorney
- Natalia Glushchenko (A Just Russia), aide to party chairman Sergey Mironov, former Member of State Assembly of the Mari El Republic (2019–2024), 2016 and 2021 candidate for this seat, 2017 head candidate
- Nikolay Ivanov (CPCR), pensioner
- Sergey Kazankov (CPRF), incumbent Member of State Duma (2016–present)
- Natalya Kozlova (United Russia), Member of State Assembly of the Mari El Republic (2019–present)
- Anastasia Makarova (The Greens), IT specialist
- Olga Mishina (Rodina), party official
- Aleksey Sherstobitov (LDPR), Member of State Assembly of the Mari El Republic (2024–present), 2021 candidate for this seat
- Pavel Svinin (RPPSS), agribusinessman

==== Withdrawn candidates ====
- Ivan Telyatyev (Yabloko), veterinarian (withdrew August 31, 2026)

==== Did not file ====
- Nikolay Pavlov (Independent), retired locksmith

==== Declined ====
- Vasily Arisov (United Russia), Member of State Assembly of the Mari El Republic (2024–present), military physician, 2022 Independent head candidate (lost the primary)

==== Results ====
Summary of the 18-20 September 2026 Russian legislative election in the Mari El constituency
Candidate	Party	Votes	%
Sergey Kazankov (incumbent)	Communist Party	134,490	52.78%
Natalya Kozlova	United Russia	60,004	23.55%
Andrey Gavrilov	New People	16,441	6.45%
Natalia Glushchenko	A Just Russia	11,915	4.68%
Aleksey Sherstobitov	Liberal Democratic Party	11,598	4.55%
Pavel Svinin	Party of Pensioners	7,239	2.84%
Nikolay Ivanov	Communists of Russia	4,084	1.60%
Anastasia Makarova	The Greens	2,591	1.02%
Olga Mishina	Rodina	2,009	0.79%
Total		254,833	100%
