= 2022 Mari El head election =

- 11 September 2022
- Turnout: 32.42%
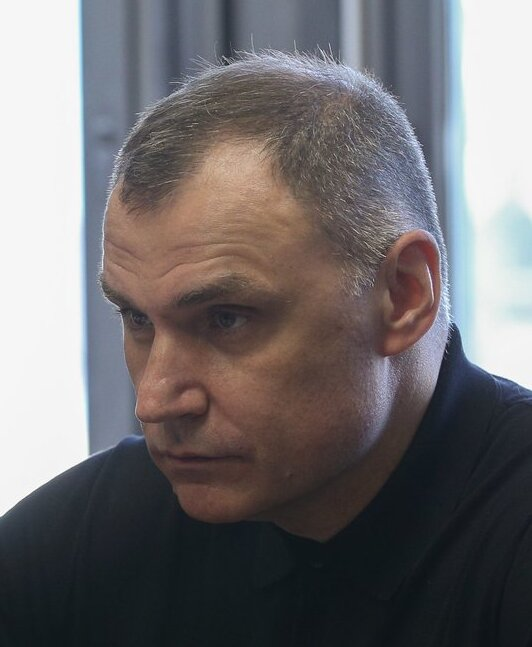
		LDPR	SR-ZP
Nominee	Yury Zaitsev	Anton Mirbadalev	Natalia Gluschchenko
Party	Independent	Liberal Democratic Party	SR-ZP
Popular vote	141,666	13,567	9,905
Percentage	82.44%	7.90%	5.76%
Head before election
Yury Zaitsev (acting)
United Russia
Elected Head
Yury Zaitsev
Independent

The 2022 Mari El Republic head election took place on 11 September 2022, on common election day. Acting Head Yury Zaitsev was elected for a full term.

== Background ==
Chairman of the Moscow Oblast Court of Arbitration Alexander Yevstifeyev was appointed Head of Mari El in April 2017, replacing controversial 4-term incumbent Leonid Markelov. Officially an independent, Yevstifeyev was nominated by United Russia as its head candidate in the following election, which he won with 88.27%, facing little opposition.

Despite a landslide victory in the head election, during Yevtufeyev's term United Russia ratings in the republic had slipped, as the party won only 37.5% of the vote in 2019 legislative election, while CPRF scored 27%. The ruling party suffered further defeats in the 2021 Russian legislative election: Communist incumbent Sergey Kazankov was reelected in Mari El constituency with 50.36%, and CPRF won by party lists with 36.3% to United Russia's 33.4%.

Aleksander Yevstifeyev allegedly took a leave of absence and asked for his resignation in February 2022 due to his lack of interest leading the region for another 5 years. Given United Russia poor performance in the republic, several candidates from opposition parties were considered for Yevstifeyev's replacement, including State Duma member Sergey Kazankov (CPRF) and State Duma Deputy Speaker Vladislav Davankov (New People). On 10 May Aleksandr Yevtifeyev resigned and President Vladimir Putin appointed Prime Minister of Kalmykia Yury Zaitsev as acting Head of Mari El.

Due to the start of Russian invasion of Ukraine in February 2022 and subsequent economic sanctions the cancellation and postponement of direct gubernatorial elections was proposed. The measure was even supported by A Just Russia leader Sergey Mironov. Eventually, the postponement never occurred, as on 10 June State Assembly of the Mari El Republic called head election for 11 September 2022.

== Candidates ==
Until 2022 only political parties could nominate candidates for head election in Mari El, however, in May 2022 Mari El State Assembly passed a law, allowing self-nomination in the head elections. Candidate for Head of Mari El should be a Russian citizen and at least 30 years old. Each candidate in order to be registered is required to collect at least 9% of signatures of members and heads of municipalities. Self-nominating candidates in addition should collect signatures of 1% of registered voters, or 5,320 people. Also gubernatorial candidates present 3 candidacies to the Federation Council and election winner later appoints one of the presented candidates.

=== Registered ===
- Natalia Glushchenko (SR-ZP), Member of State Assembly of the Mari El Republic, 2017 head candidate
- Anton Mirbadalev (LDPR), Member of State Assembly of the Mari El Republic
- Yury Zaitsev (Independent), acting Head of Mari El, former Prime Minister of Kalmykia (2019-2022)
- Valentina Zlobina (RPPSS), former Deputy Chair of the State Assembly of the Mari El Republic (2004-2007), 2017 head candidate

=== Did not file ===
- Vasily Arisov (Independent), physician (failed to collect enough signatures)

=== Declined ===
- Ivan Kazankov (CPRF), Member of State Assembly of the Mari El Republic, general director of Zvenigovsky sovkhoz, former Member of State Duma (1999-2003)
- Sergey Kazankov (CPRF), Member of State Duma

=== Candidates for Federation Council ===
- Natalia Glushchenko (SR-ZP):
  - Boris Gerasimov, former Member of the State Assembly of the Mari El Republic (2014-2019)
  - Aleksey Ivanov, ecological activist
  - Andrey Zabolotskikh, Member of the State Assembly of the Mari El Republic
- Anton Mirbadalev (LDPR):
  - Albert Fyodorov, former Member of the Medvedevo Council of Deputies, 2017 head candidate
  - Dmitry Mikhaylov, self-employed
  - Aleksey Sherstobitov, Member of the Medvedevsky District Council of Deputies
- Yury Zaitsev (Independent):
  - Konstantin Kosachev, incumbent Senator, Deputy Chairman of the Federation Council
  - Anatoly Smirnov, Chairman of the State Assembly of the Mari El Republic
  - Mikhail Vasyutin, First Deputy Chairman of the Government of Mari El
- Valentina Zlobina (RPPSS):
  - Raisa Khakimova, pensioner
  - Marina Kochkina, pensioner
  - Lidia Tysko, pensioner

== Finances ==
All sums are in rubles.

Financial Report	Source	Arisov	Glushchenko	Mirbadalev	Zaitsev	Zlobina
First		10,000	20,000	217,000	25,100,000	9,800,000
Final		10,000	TBD	4,420,000	50,100,000	11,800,000

== Results ==
Summary of the 11 September 2022 Mari El head election results
Candidate	Party	Votes	%
Yury Zaitsev (incumbent)	Independent	141,666	82.44
Anton Mirbadalev	Liberal Democratic Party	13,567	7.90
Natalia Glushchenko	A Just Russia — For Truth	9,905	5.76
Valentina Zlobina	Party of Pensioners	3,910	2.28
Valid votes		169,048	98.37
Blank ballots		2,794	1.62
Total		171,842	100.00
Turnout		171,842	32.42
Registered voters		530,019	100.00

Incumbent Senator Konstantin Kosachev (United Russia) was re-appointed to the Federation Council.

== See also ==
- 2022 Russian gubernatorial elections
