= Flag of Mari El =

Flag of the Russian republic of Mari El

Mari El Republic
- Proportion: 2:3
- Adopted: 1 June 2011
- Design: A white field with a ornament pattern on the hoist and the Mari coat of arms offset to the right.
- Designed by: Andrey Sannikov
- Use: Standard of the Head of the Mari El Republic
- Proportion: 1:1

The flag of Mari El (Meadow Mari: Марий Элын тистыже, romanized: Marij Elyn tistyžje, Hill Mari: Мары Элын флагшы, romanized: Mary Elyn flagšy), a federal subject and republic in the Russian Federation, was adopted by the Parliament of Mari El on 1 June 2011.

== Description ==
The symbol of the flag is the coat of arms which consists of a bear. The crown and the sword on the flag symbolizes nationhood and power, respectively. The base of the emblem is a shield which contains a sign which was there on the previous flag.

== Previous flags ==
Within the Russian Soviet Federative Socialist Republic, the flag adorned the Russian SFSR flag with the republic's name on the bottom.

During the dissolution of the Soviet Union the newly founded Mari El Republic adopted a blue-white-red horizontal tricolor with a Mari cultural symbol offset to the hoist with "Mari El" written in Mari underneath. In 2006 the flag was modified to enlarge and centralize the Mari cultural symbol as well as removing the text and changing the ratio and shade of the stripes. This flag would be replaced in 2011 with the current one.

The current flag was adopted by Leonid Markelov, noted for his authoritarian pro-Russian, anti-Mari, administration and his later arrest for accepting bribes, and was designed by Andrey Sannikov. However, the adoption of the new flag was unusual, with Chairman of the Heraldic Council of the President of the Russian Federation, Georgy Vilinbakhov, noting that Markelov broke precedent for changing a republican symbol, as that only happens when an entity's border changes.

The current flag is largely associated with Markelov and Putinism, and as such Russian opposition movements in coordination with the World Congress of Finno-Ugric Peoples have launched a political campaign to restore the 2006–2011 flag, citing the aforementioned legal irregularity of Markelov's change.

Mari Autonomous Oblast (1918–1936)

Mari ASSR (1937–1954)

Mari ASSR (1954–1978)

Mari ASSR (1978–1990)

Mari SSR (1990–1992)

Mari El (1992–2006)

Mari El (2006–2011)

Standard of the President of the Mari El Republic (2006–2011)

== Proposed flags ==
Proposed flag in 1992.

Proposed flag in 1992.

Proposed flag in 1992.

== Flags of the Mari people ==
Flag of Mari people used in UNPO (1991–2008)

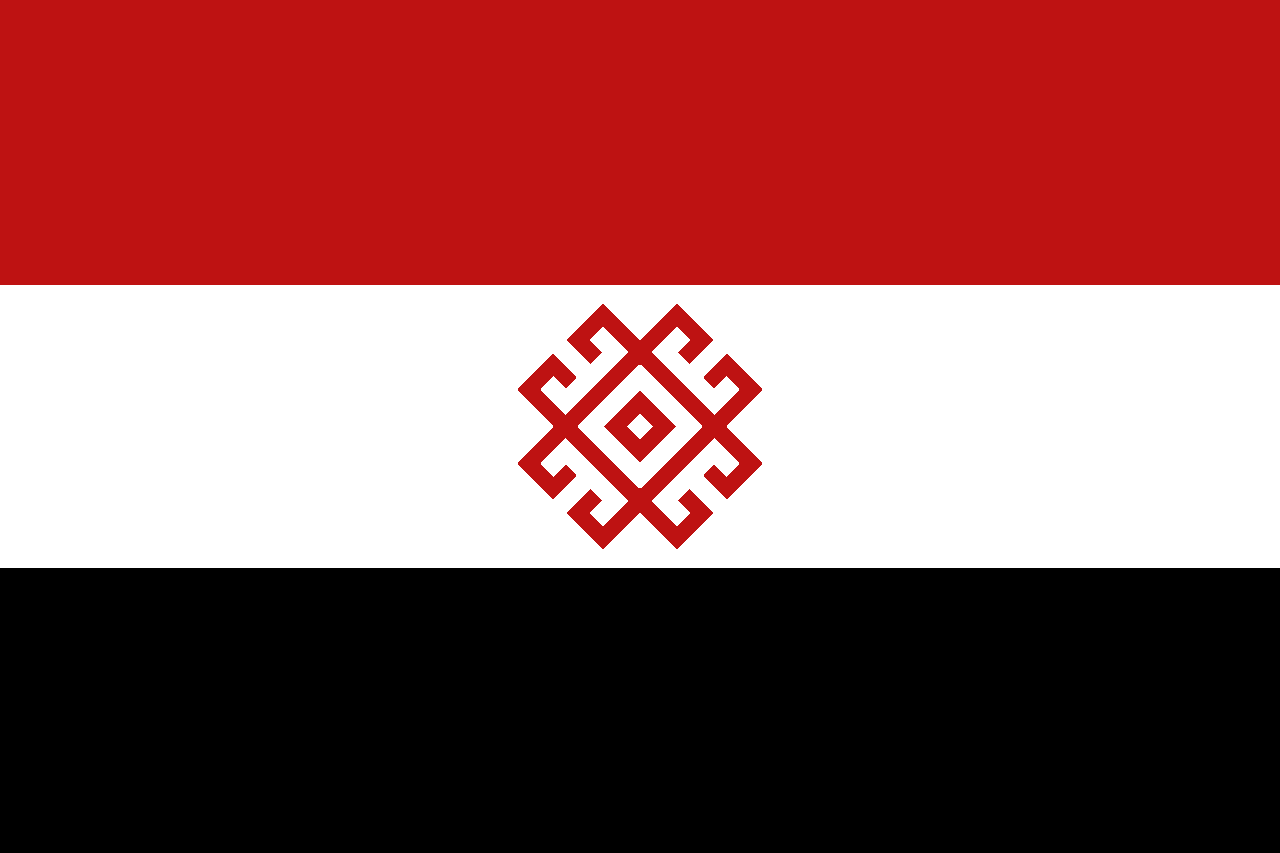
Mari Mlande flag, used as an alternative flag of the mari people, combines the 2006 version of the flag, as well as the colors of the flags of Mari organizations of the 20 century.
