= Vladislav Zotin =

Russian politician (born 1942)

- Владислав Зотин
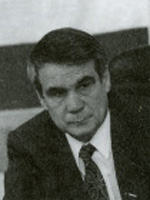
- Zotin in 2008

1st President of Mari El
- In office December 24, 1991 – January 5, 1997
- Preceded by: Position established
- Succeeded by: Vyacheslav Kislitsyn

Personal details
- Born: May 22, 1942 (age 83) Kilemary, Mari ASSR, RSFSR, USSR
- Party: Communist Party of the Soviet Union (until 1991)
- Profession: Mechanical Engineer

Vladislav Maksimovich Zotin (Russian: Владислав Максимович Зотин; born 1942) is a Russian retired politician who served as the President of Mari El from 1991 to early 1997. As president, he is described to have been responsible for maintaining peace, order, and the rule of law in Mari El. At the same time, he garnered controversy for electoral fraud.

== Biography ==
Zotin was born in the village of Kilemary, of the Mari ASSR to Maxim Zotin, a newspaper editor and Zoya Zotina, a school teacher at a rural school. His father was killed during a World War II attack in 1943, leaving Zotin completely dependent on his mother. Zotin was educated in Moscow, and spent much of his life as a chief engineer of industrial development. Shortly after he entered politics. In 1991, he was elected president of Mari El.

In 1996, a criminal case was initiated against Zotin's main opponent in an upcoming election, Vyacheslav Kislitsyn, who was removed from the post of head of Medvedevsky District. Later, the president tried to remove Kislitsyn and Leonid Markelov from the ballot, referring to their ignorance of the Mari language. However, the local election commission did not consider this a sufficient reason. As a result, Zotin did not qualify for the runoff, being surpassed by Kislitsyn and Markelov.

Shortly after 1997, Zotin retired from politics and now is in retirement. He is married and has two sons.

In July 2017 Zotin was elected chairman of the Civic Chamber of the Mari El Republic supported by Mari Ushem movement. However, the chamber decided to elect a new chairman already in December, claiming that Zotin was absent at the meetings. Ex-president himself said that his removal was forced by the new head of the region Alexander Yevstifeyev.
