= Mari Ushem =

Russian non-governmental organization

- Flag of Mari Ushem
- Established: 1917; 1989 (re-established)
- Type: NGO
- Location: Yoshkar-Ola, Russia
- Region served: Mari El
- Publication: Mari Chang
- Website: марийушем.рф

Mari Ushem (Meadow Mari and Russian: Марий ушем; Hill Mari: Мары ушем, lit. 'Mari Union') is a Russian non-governmental organization, whose activity is dedicated to preservation of the Mari culture.

== Origins ==
Mari Ushem traces its history back to March 1917, when the first ethnic organizations appeared among the Eastern Mari (north of modern Bashkortostan), followed by the Mari of Tsaryovokokshaysk and Urzhum uyezds. They aimed to provide education for Mari and to bridge the 'culture gap' between the Mari and their neighbours (Russians and Tatars). These groups were united by the Central Mari Union (Mari Ushem) in Kazan. It was banned in December 1918, soon after the Bolsheviks took over Kazan, and the Mari societies were later replaced by Mari sections under local Communist party committees.

== Re-establishment ==
Mari Ushem was re-established in 1989 at the joint meeting of regional offices of the All-Russian Society for the Protection of Historical and Cultural Monuments, the Soviet Culture Foundation and Memorial society in Mari ASSR. The inaugural congress was held on 8 April 1990.

The group's climax in popularity came in April of 2005 when Mari El hosted the tenth meeting of the World Congress of Finno-Ugric Peoples. The conference was mostly used as a propaganda tool for the Republic's government and was highly protested by Mari Ushem as "hijacked". These protests grew due to the killing of journalists in the Republic, and the repression of the Mari language. Any and all members of Mari Ushem were barred from interacting with the foreign dignitaries. At the conference, the Republic’s then President, Leonid Markelov, a Russian from Moscow, denied that the Maris were nationalistic or needed further legal protection. He was compared to Joseph Stalin and Alexander Lukashenko due to his crackdown and control of the press and his harassment of opposition, namely the Mari Ushem. Markelov would push Mari Ushem to largely become an underground organization, with every rally and meeting the group attempted to hold facing a strong police presence to disperse them.

In March 2022, the group received attention after one of their members, Viktor Novogorsky, was expelled from university for his membership in the group. Novogorsky posted an image to his social media of him placing a wreath of flowers under a bust of Sergei Chavain, and standing vigil next to the bust with another activist for around an hour. Shortly after he posted this he was expelled. The university cited "poor performance" as the reason for his expulsion, however, Novogorsky had no poor grades to back up these claims. The group has protested his expulsion, claiming that Novogorsky had violated no laws and that his expulsion was illegal.

As of April 2026, the latest Mari Ushem meeting was the 11th Congress, held in April 2020 in Yoshkar-Ola.

=== Mari National Rebirth Party ===
Mari National Rebirth Party "Ushem" was a political party in Mari El, founded in December 1994 as the political wing of the Mari Ushem movement. The party had around 300 members. Mari Ushem supported Anatoly Popov in 1991 and 1996 presidential elections in Mari El.
