= Sergey Kazankov =

Russian politician

- Сергей Казанков
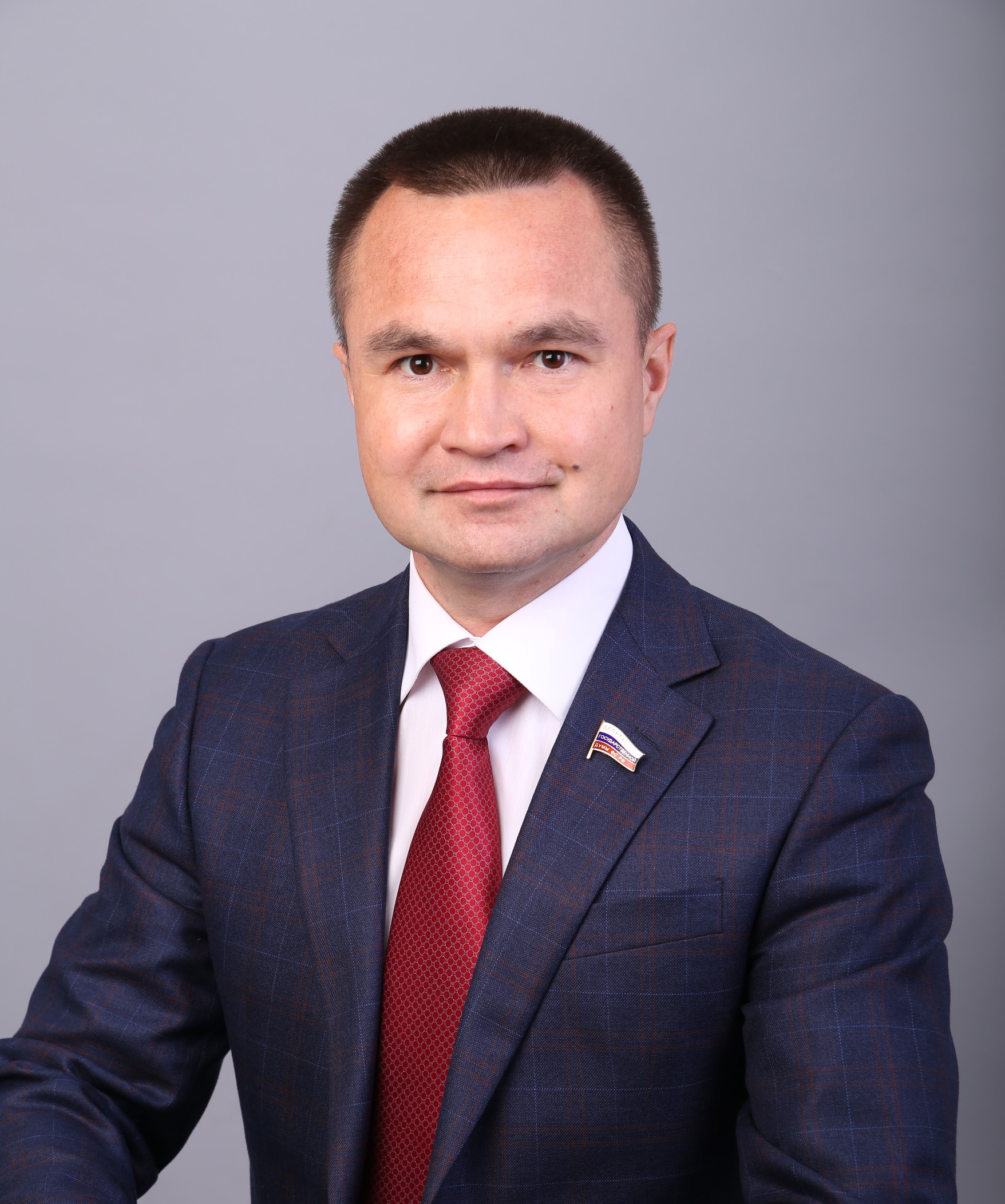
- Kazankov in 2016

Member of the State Duma for Mari El
- Incumbent
- Assumed office 5 October 2016
- Preceded by: constituency re-established
- Constituency: Mari El-at-large (No. 22)

Personal details
- Born: 9 October 1972 (age 54) Mar'ino, Yurinsky District, Mari ASSR, Russian SFSR, Soviet Union
- Party: Communist Party of the Russian Federation
- Education: Kazan State Medical University

Sergey Ivanovich Kazankov (Russian: Сергей Иванович Казанков; born 9 September 1972) is a Russian politician and a deputy of the 7th, 8th, and 9th State Dumas.

Sergey Kazankov was born in the family of the deputy of the 3rd State Duma Ivan Kazankov. Even though Kazankov graduated from the Kazan State Medical University, he left the profession and engaged in agriculture. In 2000, he became the General Director of the meat-packing plant "Zvenigovsky". From 2000 to 2016, he was the deputy of the State Assembly of the Mari El Republic of the 3rd, 4th, 5th, 6th convocations. In 2016, he was elected deputy of the 7th State Duma. Since September 2021, he has served as deputy of the 8th State Duma.

== Sanctions ==
He was sanctioned by the UK government in 2022 in relation to the Russo-Ukrainian War.
