= Head of Mari El =

Highest-ranking official in Mari El, Russia

Head of the Mari El Republic
- Глава Республики Марий Эл (Russian); Марий Эл Республикын Вуйлатышыже (Meadow Mari); Мары Эл Республикӹн Вуйлатышыжы (Hill Mari)
- Standard of the head of the republic

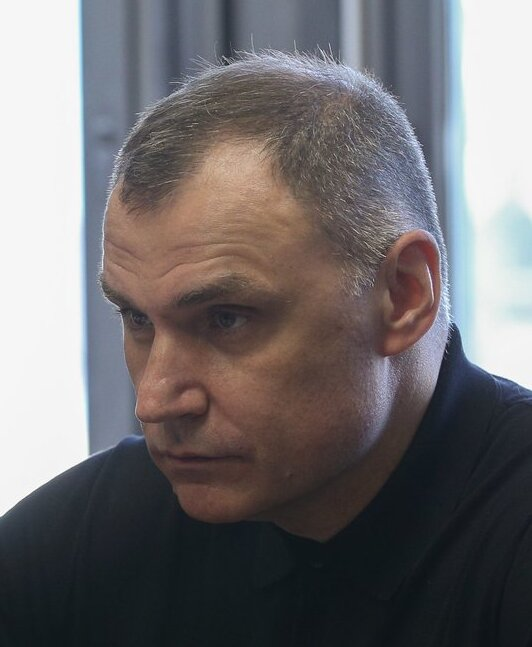
- Incumbent; Yury Zaitsev since 10 May 2022
- Executive branch of the Mari El Republic
- Style: His Excellency; The Honorable
- Type: Governor; Head of state; Head of government
- Seat: Yoshkar-Ola
- Appointer: Direct elections
- Term length: 5 years; renewable
- Constituting instrument: Constitution of Mari El, Section 4
- Formation: 24 December 1991
- First holder: Vladislav Zotin
- Website: Official website

The Head of the Mari El Republic, formerly known as the President of Mari El Republic, is the highest executive position in Mari El, a federal subject of Russia.

The first president of Mari El was Vladislav Zotin when the position was created on 24 December 1991, two days before dissolution of the Soviet Union, replacing the First Secretary of the Mari Communist Party, the equivalent position of the Mari ASSR before it was succeeded by the Mari El Republic. The status and powers of the president were determined by Chapter 4 of the Constitution of the Mari El Republic.

In December 2010, Russian president Dmitry Medvedev signed a law that forbade calling the heads of federal subjects as "president", and must bring their constitutions or statutes in conformity with the law before 1 January 2015. The office was renamed to head (Vuylatyshyzhe in Mari) in June 2011.

Since 10 May 2022, the head is Yury Zaitsev.

== List of heads ==
No.	Portrait	Name (born–died)	Term of office			Political party	Elected	Ref.
No.	Portrait	Name (born–died)	Took office	Left office	Time in office	Political party	Elected	Ref.
1		Vladislav Zotin (born 1942)	24 December 1991	14 January 1997	5 years, 21 days	Independent	1991	
2		Vyacheslav Kislitsyn (born 1948)	14 January 1997	14 January 2001	4 years, 0 days	Communist Party	1996–97	
3		Leonid Markelov (born 1963)	14 January 2001	14 January 2015	14 years, 0 days	LDPR → Independent → United Russia	2000; 2004; 2009 (Note: Appointed by the president of Russia with the consent of the State Assembly.)	
–		Leonid Markelov (born 1963)	14 January 2015	21 September 2015	250 days	LDPR → Independent → United Russia	– (Note: Acting head of the republic)	
(3)		Leonid Markelov (born 1963)	21 September 2015	6 April 2017	1 year, 197 days	LDPR → Independent → United Russia	2015	
–		Alexander Yevstifeyev (1958–2024)	6 April 2017	21 September 2017	168 days	Independent	–	
4		Alexander Yevstifeyev (1958–2024)	21 September 2017	10 May 2022	4 years, 231 days	Independent	2017	
–		Yury Zaitsev (born 1970)	10 May 2022	23 September 2022	136 days	United Russia	–	
5		Yury Zaitsev (born 1970)	23 September 2022	Incumbent	3 years, 349 days	United Russia	2022	

== Elections ==
The latest election for the office was held on 10 September 2017.

Candidates	Party	Votes	%
Alexander Yevstifeyev	United Russia	208,855	88.27
Albert Fyodorov	Liberal Democratic Party	11,982	5.06
Natalia Glushenko	A Just Russia	8,232	3.48
Valentina Zlobina	Party of Pensioners	4,159	1.76
Source: Сводная таблица результатов выборов

== Sources ==
- Russian Administrative divisions
