= Vyacheslav Kislitsyn =

Russian politician

- Вячеслав Кислицын
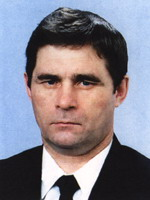

2nd President of Mari El
- In office January 5, 1997 – January 14, 2001
- Preceded by: Vladislav Zotin
- Succeeded by: Leonid Markelov

Personal details
- Born: September 4, 1948 (age 77) Kosolapovo, Mari ASSR, RSFSR, USSR
- Party: Communist Party of the Russian Federation
- Profession: Historian

Vyacheslav Alexandrovich Kislitsyn (Russian: Вячеслав Александрович Кислицын; born 1948) is a Russian politician who served as the President of Mari El from 1997 to 2001. During his presidency, he was responsible for much of the economic development in Mari El. At the same time, he was criticised for his autocratic ideology, accused of supporting Chechen rebels, and his supposed 'cult of personality'. In the 2001 elections, he suffered a tight defeat against his opponent Leonid Markelov, where Kislitsyn received 25% of the vote. Since then, his political whereabouts are left unknown.

== Biography ==
Kislitsyn is of Russian descent. Kislitsyn was born in 1948 in the Mari ASSR of the Soviet Union. Prior to serving in the Soviet Army, he was trained as mechanic in a specialized vocational school in Tomsk. He graduated from the Tomsk Railway College. After serving in the Army from 1971, he worked as the chairman of the District Committee for Physical Culture and Sports, the instructor of the Executive Committee Medvedevsky District Council. In 1978 he graduated from the Faculty of History, Mari State Pedagogical Institute. He began his political career during the Soviet Union, where he eventually became President of Mari El. Kislitsyn is married, and he has one daughter.
