= Yury Zaitsev =

Yury Zaitsev may refer to:

- Yury Zaitsev (weightlifter) (1951–2022), Soviet and Russian weightlifter
- Yury Zaitsev (politician) (born 1970), Russian politician
