= Flag of the Mari Autonomous Soviet Socialist Republic =

Mari Autonomous Soviet Socialist Republic
- Flag of the Mari ASSR (1978–1990)
- Use: Civil and state flag
- Proportion: 1:2
- Adopted: 19 June 1954; 27 May 1978 (minor changes)
- Design: A red flag with a light-blue stripe at the pole, with golden red star and hammer and sickle.
- Designed by: Valentin Petrovich Viktorov

The flag the Mari Autonomous Soviet Socialist Republic was adopted in 1954 by the government of the Mari Autonomous Soviet Socialist Republic. The flag is identical to the flag of the Russian Soviet Federative Socialist Republic.

== History ==
=== First version ===
On June 21, 1937, the Extraordinary 11th Congress of Soviets of the Mari ASSR adopted the Constitution of the Republic, which was approved by the Supreme Soviet of the RSFSR on June 2, 1940. The flag of the republic according to the Article 112 of the constitution was a red cloth with golden inscriptions: "РСФСР" and "Марийская АССР". The 1937 constitution did not specify the languages on the inscription. The 1949 edition of the 1937 Constitution of the Mari ASSR specified the languages of the inscriptions, which is in Mari and Russian languages.

=== Second version ===
After changing the flag of the RSFSR, the Mari flag changed accordingly. It was formalized by law of June 19, 1954. After changing the flag of the RSFSR, the Mari flag changed accordingly. As in the RSFSR, the red flag with a blue stripe along the pole was the flag, the width of the strip was 1/8 the length of the cloth, on the red field at the pole there was a golden sickle and hammer, a red star with a gold border and the name of the republic in Russian.

The Provisions on the State flag of the Mari Autonomous Soviet Socialist Republic was approved by the Decree of the Presidium of the Supreme Council of the Mari ASSR of February 6, 1956.

=== Third version ===
A new version of the flag was described in the Article 158 of the Constitution of the Mari ASSR, approved by the extraordinary IX session of the Supreme Council of the Republic of the IX convocation on May 27, 1978. The flag had the name of the republic in the Mari language added - "Марий АССР".

On October 24, 1978, the Presidium of the Armed Forces of the Mari ASSR issued a Decree on the State Flag of the Mari ASSR, which was approved by the Law of the Mari ASSR on December 26, 1978. In 1981, a new version of the Provisions on the flag of the Mari ASSR was approved.

== Gallery ==
21 June 1937 - 19 June 1954

19 June 1954 - 27 May 1978

27 May 1978 - 22 October 1990

22 October 1990 (as the Mari SSR) - 3 September 1992 (adoption of the Flag of Mari El)
