= MASSR =

MASSR may refer to:

- The Mari Autonomous Soviet Socialist Republic, an autonomous polity of the Russian SFSR
- The Mordovian Autonomous Soviet Socialist Republic, an autonomous polity of the Russian SFSR
- The Moldavian Autonomous Soviet Socialist Republic, an autonomous polity of the Ukrainian SSR
- The mass-asymptotic speed relation, a relation between the mass and rotation speed of a disk galaxy, as predicted by Modified Newtonian dynamics
