= Zoya Konstantinovna Vargina =

Moldovan politician (1918–2009)

Chairman of the State Forestry Committee of the Council of Ministers

Personal details
- Born: January 18, 1918
- Died: May 24, 2009 (aged 91) Chisinau, Moldova
- Education: Volga State Technological University (1942)
- Profession: Forestry engineer

Zoya Konstantinovna Vargina (18 January 1918 - 24 May 2009) was a Soviet-Moldovan Politician (Communist). In 1961-1966 she was the head of the Main Directorate of Forestry and Nature Protection under the Council of Ministers of the Moldavian SSR.

== Biography ==
She was born on January 18, 1918, in the village of Polovinno-Ovrazhskoye (now in the Yaransky district of the Kirov region).

In 1942 she graduated from the Volga Forestry Institute with a degree in forestry engineering and was appointed to the position of forester of the Orsha Forestry of the Mari ASSR. The forestry carried out orders for the front: they made blanks for skis, stocks for rifles.

After the war she moved to Moldova. She worked in the apparatus of the Council of Ministers of the Moldavian SSR as a senior assistant. In 1961 - Head of the Main Directorate of Forestry and Nature Protection under the Council of Ministers of the Moldavian SSR. In 1966-1975 - Chairman of the State Forestry Committee of the Council of Ministers of the Moldavian SSR.

She died on May 24, 2009, in the city of Chisinau, Republic of Moldova.
