= 1921 Mari wildfires =

1921 deadly wildfires in the Mari Autonomous Oblast, RSFSR

- Date: 1921
- Location: Mari Autonomous Oblast, Russian SFSR, USSR

Statistics
- Burned area: 2,660 square kilometres (660,000 acres)
- Land use: Mixed, residential and forest

Impacts
- Deaths: 35 lives

In the summer of 1921, deadly wildfires occurred in the Mari Autonomous Oblast of the Russian Soviet Federative Socialist Republic (RSFSR), burning approximately 2,660 square kilometers of pine forests and dealing considerable damage to the local industry, which had already been devastated by the Povolzhye famine. Overall, the wildfires caused in total 35 deaths, 1000 cattle deaths, and the destruction of 60 villages.
