= Mari El =

First-level administrative division of Russia

Mari El Republic Республика Марий Эл (Russian)
- Republic

Other transcription(s)
  - Meadow Mari: Марий Эл Республик
  - Hill Mari: Мары Эл Республик
- Flag Coat of arms
- Anthem: "State Anthem of the Mari El Republic"
- Interactive map of Mari El Republic
- Location within European Russia
- Coordinates: 56°42′N 47°52′E
- Country: Russia
- Federal district: Volga
- Economic region: Volga-Vyatka
- Established: December 5, 1936
- Capital: Yoshkar-Ola

Government
  - Body: State Assembly
  - Head: Yury Zaitsev

Area
  - Total: 23,375 km^{2} (9,025 sq mi)
  - Rank: 72nd

Population (2021 census)
  - Total: 672,093: 40.1% Mari; 52.5% Russians; 4.8% Tatars; 0.6% Chuvash
  - Estimate (2018): 682,333
  - Rank: 64th
  - Density: 28.753/km^{2} (74.469/sq mi)
  - Urban: 68.4%
  - Rural: 31.6%

GDP (nominal, 2024)
  - Total: ₽355 billion (US$4.17 billion)
  - Per capita: ₽530,998 (US$6,230.84)
- Time zone: UTC+3 (MSK)
- ISO 3166 code: RU-ME
- License plates: 12
- OKTMO ID: 88000000
- Official languages: Russian; Mari (Meadow and Hill)
- Website: https://mari-el.gov.ru/

- People: Mari
- Language: Mari
- Country: Mari El

Mari El, (Note: /mɑːˌriː ˈɛl/ mar-EE EL; Russian: Марий Эл, IPA: [mɐˌrʲij ˈɛl]; Meadow Mari: Марий Эл; Hill Mari: Мары Эл) officially the Mari El Republic, (Note: Russian: Республика Марий Эл; Meadow Mari: Марий Эл Республик; Hill Mari: Мары Эл Республик) is a republic of Russia. It is in the European region of the country, along the northern bank of the Volga River, and administratively part of the Volga Federal District. The republic has a population of 696,459 (2010 Census). Yoshkar-Ola is the capital and largest city.

Mari El, one of Russia's ethnic republics, was established for the indigenous Mari people, a Finno-Ugric nation who have traditionally lived along the Volga and Kama Rivers. The majority of the republic's population are ethnic Russians (52.5%), with a significant Mari minority (40.1%), and smaller minority populations of Tatars and Chuvash. The official languages are Russian and Mari. Mari El is bordered by Nizhny Novgorod Oblast to the west, Kirov Oblast to the north, Tatarstan to the east, and Chuvashia to the south.

== Geography ==
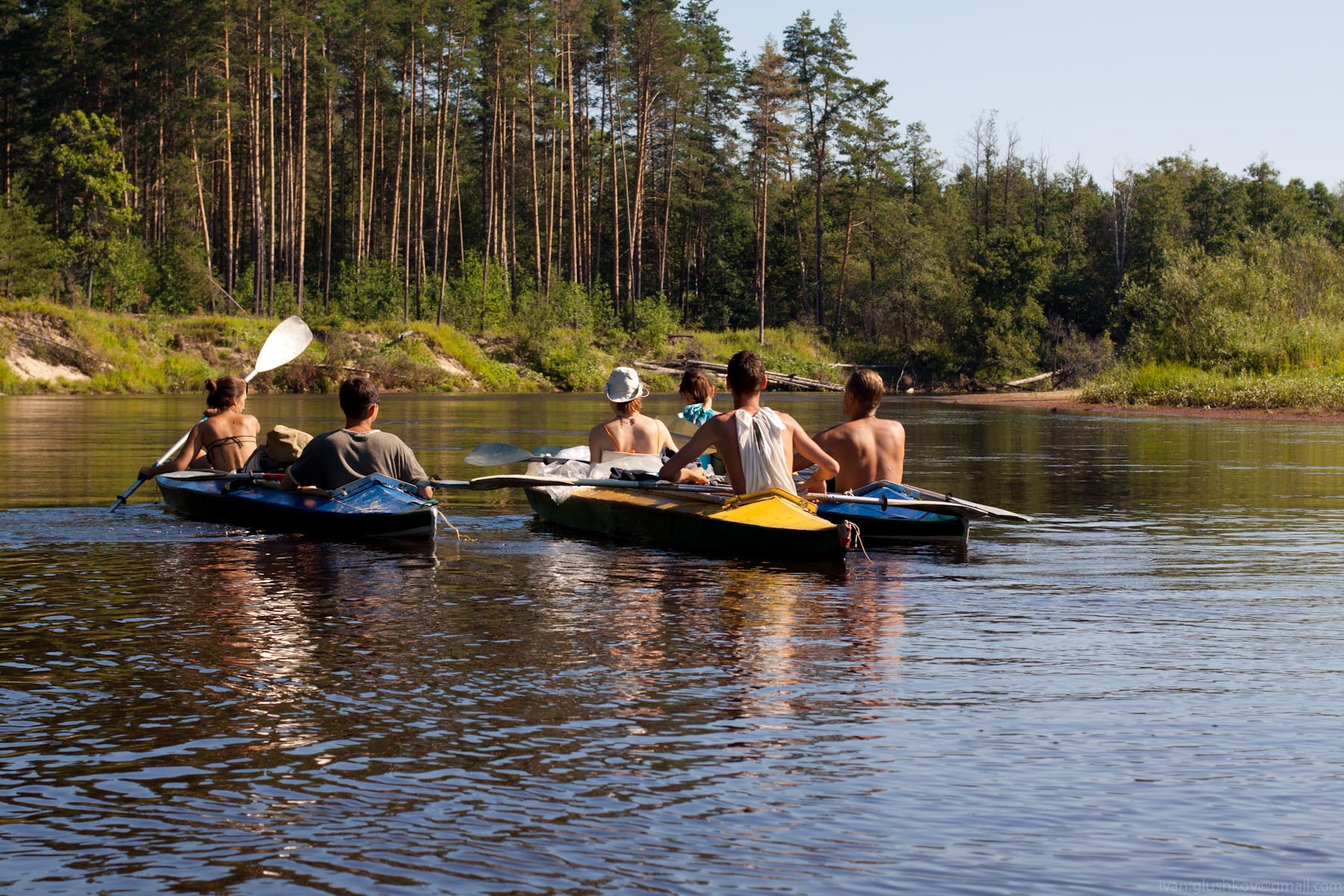
Bolshaya Kokshaga River

The republic is located in the eastern part of the East European Plain of Russia, along and mostly to the north of the Volga River. The swampy Mari Depression is in the west of the republic, contrasted by hillier landscapes in the east where the highest point of the republic (at 278 metres (912 ft)) is located. The republic borders with Kirov Oblast in the north and east, the Republic of Tatarstan in the southeast and south, the Chuvash Republic in the south, and with Nizhny Novgorod Oblast in the west and north.

There are 476 rivers in the republic, with the Volga and its tributaries being the major water arteries. Most rivers are considered to be minor—10–50 m (33–164 ft) wide and 0.5–1.4 m (1 ft 8 in – 4 ft 7 in) deep—and usually freeze between mid-November and mid-April. There are over 700 lakes and ponds; many located in the swampy areas and have areas of less than 1 km^{2} (0.39 sq mi) and depths of 1–3 m (3 ft 3 in – 9 ft 10 in). Lake Yalchik, occupying 150 hectares (370 acres), is the largest by area, while Lake Tabashinskoye is the deepest. Swamps cover large areas—10–70 km^{2} (3.9–27.0 sq mi) and up to 100 km^{2} (39 sq mi)—and usually freeze in December. While swamps tend to be shallow, with an average depth of 0.5–1.5 m (1 ft 8 in – 4 ft 11 in), they are impassable in fall and spring due to flooding.

Climate is moderately continental, with moderately cold and snowy winters and warm and often rainy summers. The average temperatures range from 18–20 °C (64–68 °F) in summer to −18 – −20 °C (0 – −4 °F) in winter. November is the windiest month of the year. Annual precipitation varies from 450 to 500 mm (18 to 20 in).

There are virtually no natural resources of industrial significance in the republic. Other resources include peat, mineral waters, and limestone. About 50% of the republic's territory is forested, although the level of forestation varies significantly from one district to another.

== History ==
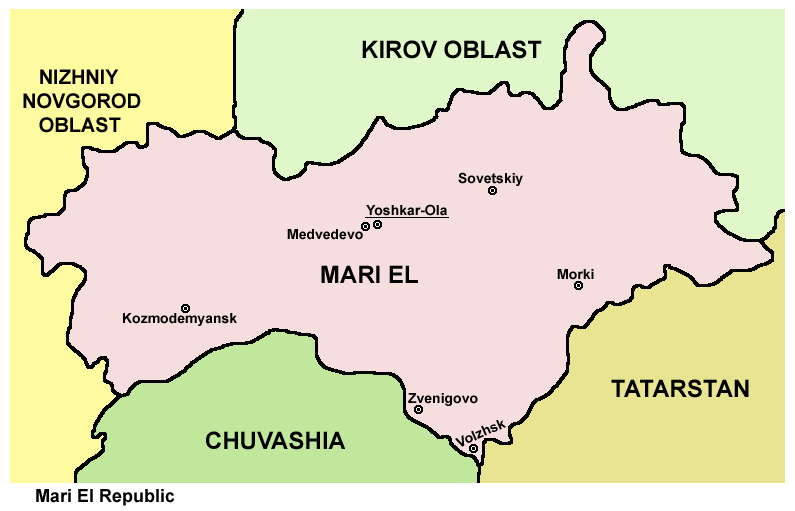
Geographical map of the Mari El Republic.

Ancient Mari tribes were known since the 5th century, though archaeologists suspect that the Mari culture is much older in its roots. Later their area was a tributary of Volga Bulgaria and the Golden Horde. In the 1440s it was incorporated into the Khanate of Kazan and was occupied by the Tsardom of Russia (governed by Ivan the Terrible) after the fall of Kazan in 1552.

After the Russian Revolution, under the Bolshevik regime, the Mari Autonomous Oblast was established on 4 November 1920. It was re-organized into the Mari ASSR on 5 December 1936, at the same time as the enactment of the 1936 Soviet Constitution. In its present form, the Mari El Republic was formed on 22 December 1990. On 21 May 1998, Mari El alongside Amur, Ivanovo, Kostroma, and Voronezh Oblast signed a power-sharing agreement with the federal government, granting it autonomy. This agreement was abolished on 31 December 2001.

The name of the republic is based on the ethnic self-designation of its indigenous population – Марий, "Mari" (from мари, "man, husband"), and эл, "country, land".

== Administrative divisions ==
Mari El Republic, Russia
Capital: Yoshkar-Ola
As of 2015:
Number of districts (районы)	14
Number of cities/towns (города)	4
Number of urban-type settlements (посёлки городского типа)	15
Number of rural okrugs (сельские округа)	120
As of 2002:
Number of rural localities (сельские населённые пункты)	1,612
Number of uninhabited rural localities (сельские населённые пункты без населения)	53

== Politics ==
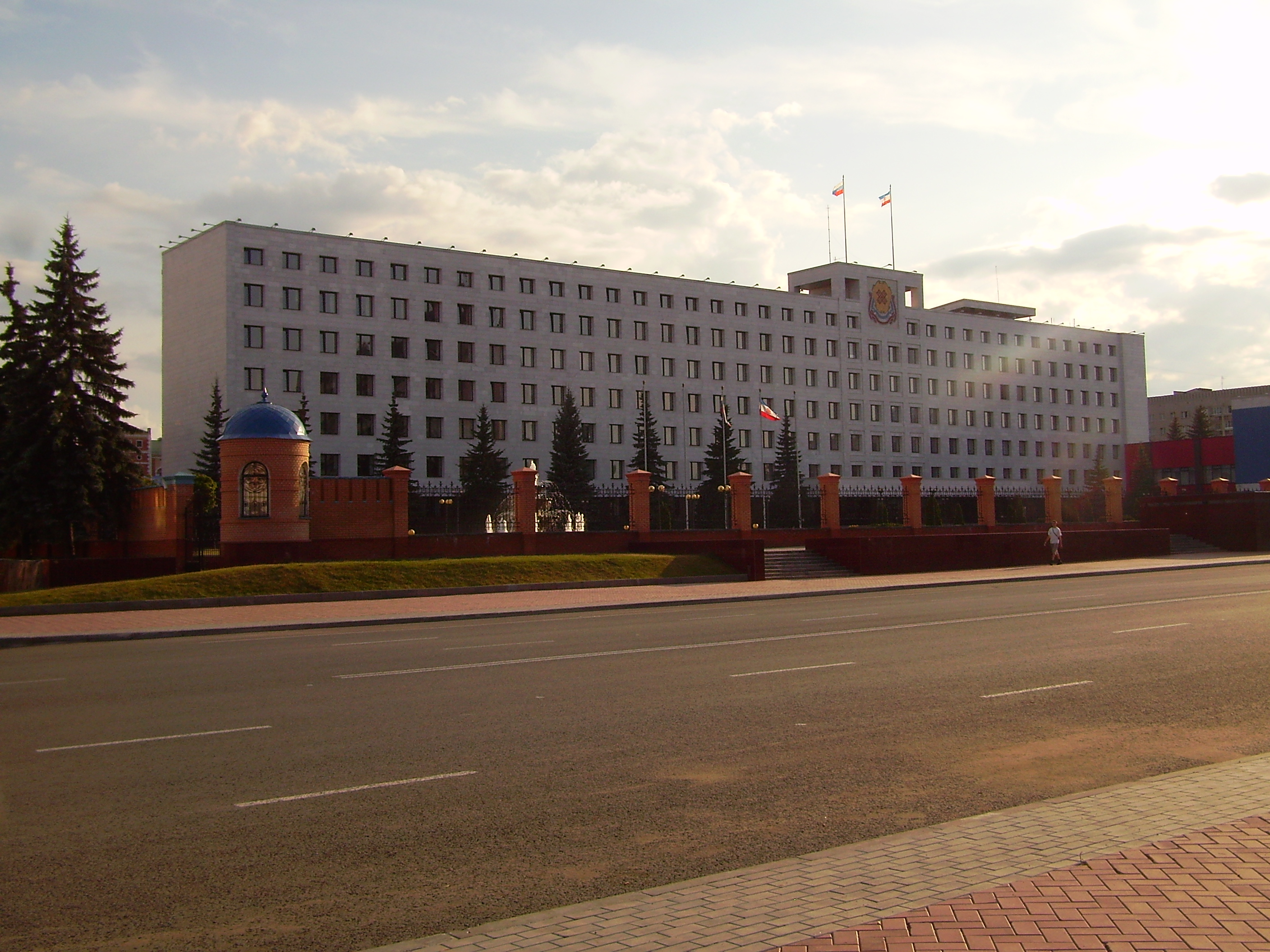
Building of the Government of Mari El.

The head of government in the Mari El Republic is the head (formerly known as the president). Alexander Yevstifeyev was appointed as the head of Mari El in April 2017 and resigned in 2022 after one term. Yury Zaitsev replaced Yevstifeyev as acting head, and Zaitsev was officially elected in September 2022.

After 2005, interethnic relations deteriorated after Leonid Markelov became president due to allegations of the repression of Mari culture. In 2006, the International Helsinki Federation for Human Rights (IHF) and the Moscow Helsinki Group (MHG) published a report where it found many obstacles to the use of the Mari language in public contexts and "a broader trend of repression of dissidents in the republic".

== Demographics ==
Population: 696,459 (2010 census); 727,979 (2002 census); 749,386 (1989 Soviet census).

=== Vital statistics ===
Source: Russian Federal State Statistics Service

	Average population (x 1000)	Live births	Deaths	Natural change	Crude birth rate (per 1000)	Crude death rate (per 1000)	Natural change (per 1000)	Fertility rates
1970	686	10,505	6,364	4,141	15.3	9.3	6.0	
1975	695	11,816	7,190	4,626	17.0	10.3	6.7	
1980	710	13,169	8,091	5,078	18.5	11.4	7.2	
1985	728	14,198	8,529	5,669	19.5	11.7	7.8	
1990	755	11,953	7,775	4,178	15.8	10.3	5.5	2,16
1991	756	10,578	7,786	2,792	14.0	10.3	3.7	1,97
1992	758	9,227	8,330	897	12.2	11.0	1.2	1,76
1993	758	8,019	9,622	1,603	10.6	12.7	2.1	1,56
1994	758	7,851	10,788	2,937	10.4	14.2	3.9	1,53
1995	757	7,337	9,999	2,662	9.7	13.2	3.5	1,43
1996	755	6,952	9,495	2,543	9.2	12.6	3.4	1,35
1997	752	6,782	9,625	2,843	9.0	12.8	3.8	1,32
1998	749	6,657	9,623	2,966	8.9	12.8	4.0	1,29
1999	746	6,597	10,674	4,077	8.8	14.3	5.5	1,28
2000	741	6,784	11,040	4,256	9.1	14.9	5.7	1,30
2001	736	6,832	11,434	4,602	9.3	15.5	6.3	1,30
2002	729	7,300	12,105	4,805	10.0	16.6	6.6	1,38
2003	723	7,515	11,861	4,346	10.4	16.4	6.0	1,40
2004	718	7,715	12,098	4,383	10.7	16.9	6.1	1,40
2005	713	7,475	12,256	4,781	10.5	17.2	6.7	1,34
2006	708	7,550	11,286	3,736	10.7	15.9	5.3	1,32
2007	704	8,306	10,745	2,439	11.8	15.3	3.5	1,45
2008	701	8,620	10,699	2,079	12.3	15.3	3.0	1,50
2009	699	8,896	10,435	1,539	12.7	14.9	2.2	1,60
2010	696	8,857	10,572	1,715	12.7	15.2	2.5	1,59
2011	694	9,066	9,816	750	13.0	14.1	1.1	1,66
2012	691	9,834	9,449	385	14.2	13.7	0.5	1,83
2013	689	10,088	9,444	644	14.6	13.7	0.9	1,93
2014	688	10,081	9,411	670	14.7	13.7	1.0	1,98
2015	687	9,951	9,448	503	14.5	13.7	0.8	1,99
2016	685	9,567	9,025	542	13.9	13.2	0.7	1,98
2017	683	8,147	8,493	-346	11.9	12.4	-0.5	1,75

Historical population
Year	Pop.	±%
1939	398,014	—
1959	647,680	+62.7%
1970	684,748	+5.7%
1979	702,744	+2.6%
1989	749,386	+6.6%
2002	727,979	−2.9%
2010	696,459	−4.3%
2021	677,097	−2.8%
Source: Census data

Note: Total fertility rate source.

=== Ethnic groups ===
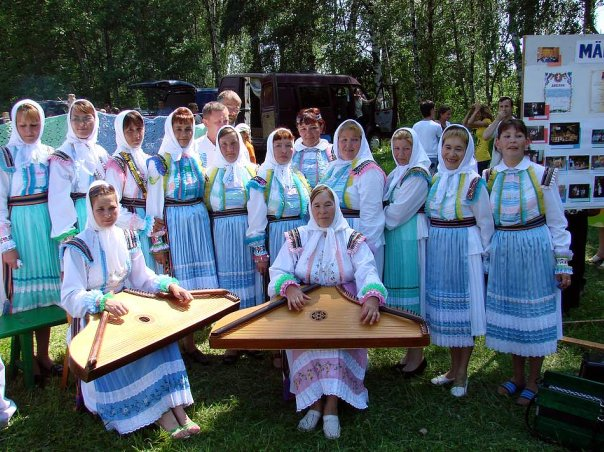
The Hill Mari, who primarily live in the Gornomariyskiy, Kilemarsky & Yurino Districts of the republic.

Though the Mari people have lived in the area for millennia, they did not have a designated territory before the Russian Revolution of 1917. According to the 2021 Census, only 58.2% of the Mari within Russia live in the Mari El Republic, while 20.1% live in the Republic of Bashkortostan (consisting of the Eastern Mari, who fled to Bashkorostan to escape religious persecution). During the last Soviet Census (1989), 4% of the Mari of the Soviet Union lived outside of Russia.

Since World War II, more ethnic Russians and Tatars have moved into the area. According to the 2021 Census, Russians make up 52.5% of the republic's population (up from 47.4% in 2010), while the ethnic Mari make up 40.1% (down from 43.9%). Other groups include Tatars (4.8%), Chuvash (0.6%), and a host of smaller groups, each accounting for less than 0.5% of the total population.

Ethnic group	1926 Census		1939 Census		1959 Census		1970 Census		1979 Census		1989 Census		2002 Census		2010 Census		2021 Census	
Ethnic group	Number	%	Number	%	Number	%	Number	%	Number	%	Number	%	Number	%	Number	%	Number	%
Mari	247,979	51.4%	273,332	47.2%	279,450	43.1%	299,179	43.7%	306,627	43.5%	324,349	43.3%	312,178	42.9%	290,863	43.9%	246,560	40.1%
Russians	210,016	43.6%	266,951	46.1%	309,514	47.8%	320,825	46.9%	334,561	47.5%	355,973	47.5%	345,513	47.5%	313,947	47.4%	322,932	52.5%
Tatars	20,219	4.2%	27,149	4.7%	38,821	6.0%	40,279	5.9%	40,917	5.8%	43,850	5.9%	43,377	6.0%	38,357	5.8%	29,317	4.8%
Chuvash	2,184	0.5%	5,504	0.9%	9,065	1.4%	9,032	1.3%	8,087	1.1%	8,993	1.2%	7,418	1.0%	6,025	0.9%	3,656	0.6%
Others	1,703	0.4%	6,674	1.2%	10,830	1.7%	15,433	2.3%	14,015	2.0%	16,167	2.2%	19,943	2.7%	13,138	2.0%	12,494	2.0%
^{1} 62,138 people were registered from administrative databases, and could not declare an ethnicity. It is estimated that the proportion of ethnicities in this group is the same as that of the declared group.

=== Religion ===
Religion in Mari El as of 2012 (Sreda Arena Atlas)
Russian Orthodoxy	47.8%
Other Orthodox	1.2%
Old Believers	1%
Other Christians	4.8%
Islam	6%
Rodnovery, Mari Native Religion and other native faiths	5.6%
Spiritual but not religious	24.8%
Atheism and irreligion	5.8%
Other and undeclared	3%

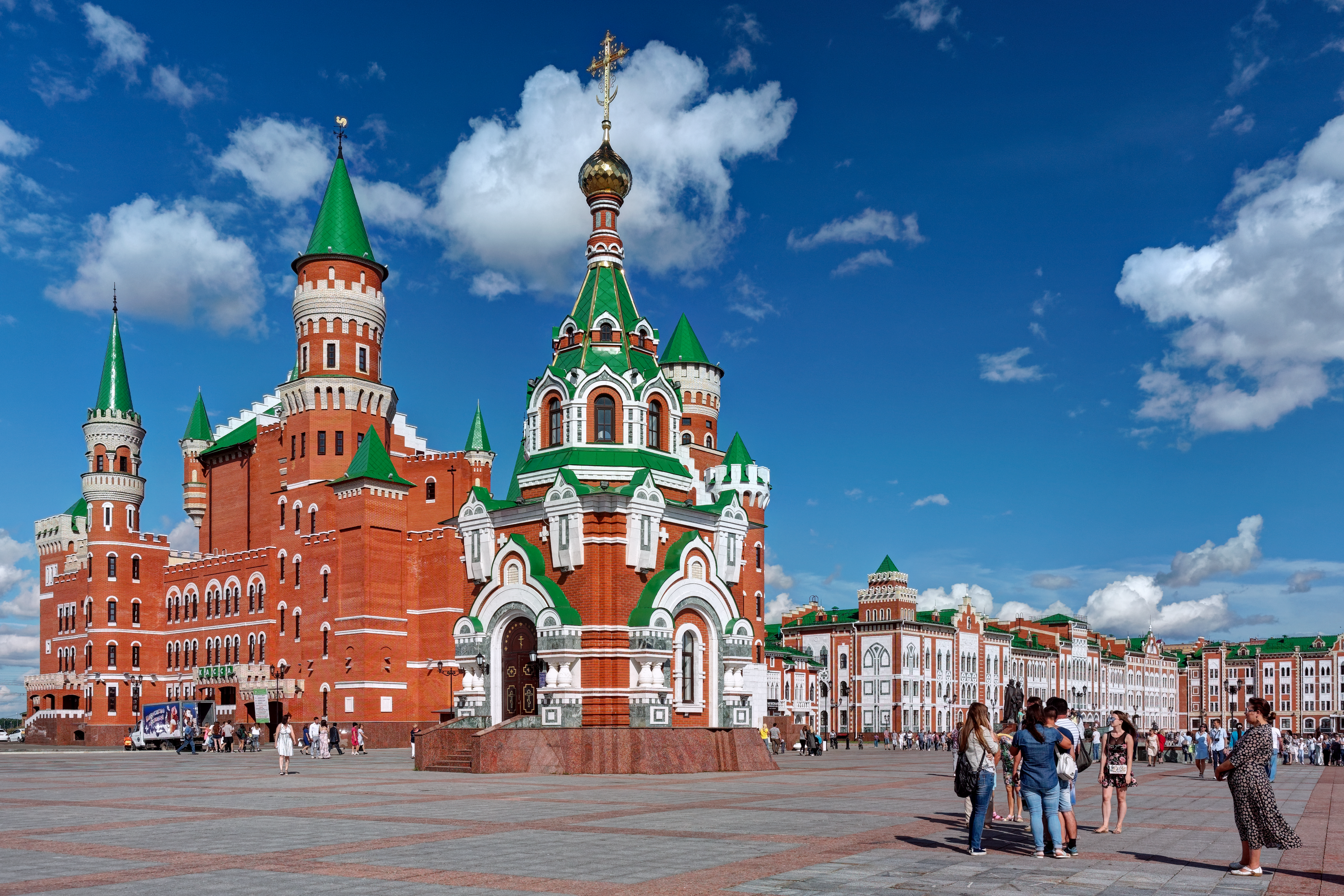
Orthodox church in Yoshkar-Ola

The religions with the most adherents in the republic are Russian Orthodoxy, the Mari native religion, the Old Believers, and Islam. The traditional Mari religion (Chimari yula) is still practised today by many Mari people and is the main religion of the Mari of Bashkortostan; also practised is a syncretism with Christianity. The Czars took drastic measures to force Christianity on the Mari, going so far as blowing up a holy mountain, and the persecution of the religion went on under the Soviet Union.

During the 1990s the religion was officially recognized by the State and began to revive. The Mari gather at around 520 holy groves where they offer animal and vegetable sacrifices, there are about 20 festivals yearly. Although traditional religion is one of Mari El's three officially recognized religions (along with Orthodoxy and Islam) Mari religious practises have come under increasing pressure, according to human rights groups.

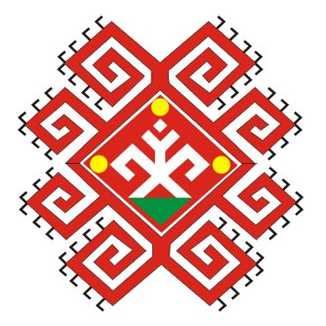
Symbol used by adherents of the Mari Native Religion.

According to a 2012 survey, 47.8% of the population of Mari El adheres to the Russian Orthodox Church, 6–15% adheres to the Mari native religion, 6% adheres to Islam, 4% are unaffiliated generic Christians, 1% are Old Believers and 1% are Orthodox Christian believers without church affiliation or members of other Orthodox churches. In addition, 25% of the population is "spiritual but not religious", 6% is atheist and 4.2% follows other religions or did not answer the question.

=== Education ===
The most important facilities of higher education are Mari State Technical University and Mari State University, both located in Yoshkar-Ola. There are also more than 900 primary and secondary schools located throughout the republic.

For the past few years, the Mari El Republic has been participating in the national project "Education" ("Oбразование"), which is designed to improve education throughout Russia by bringing new technology into the classroom, improving material conditions in schools, and providing financial awards to extraordinary students and teachers. Although the Mari language is officially a state language, Mari educators and administrators have been forced from their positions in recent years and Mari-language education has been defunded, according to the U.S. State Department, the European Union, and others.

== Economy ==
The most developed industries are machine construction, metalworking, timber, woodworking, and food industries. Most of the industrial enterprises are located in the capital Yoshkar-Ola, as well as in the towns of Kozmodemyansk, Volzhsk, and Zvenigovo.

The largest companies in the region include Mariysky Oil Refinery (revenues of $502.2 million in 2017), Mari Pulp and Paper Mill ($137.12 million), Shelanger Chemical Plant "Siver" ($14.52 million), Marbiopharm ($14.02 million).

=== Transportation ===
Traveling cheaply and quickly to various towns and villages within the republic is made possible through a network of fifteen train stations, fifty-three bus stations, and numerous marshrutkas. The republic is connected to different regions throughout Russia by daily trains to and from Moscow and Kazan, flights on one commercial airline from Yoshkar-Ola Airport, located near Yoshkar-Ola, and a port on the Volga River in Kozmodemyansk. There are also four other minor river ports in the republic. Regional automobile code is 12.

=== Communication ===
Telephony, Internet service, and cable television are provided by VolgaTelecom.

== Culture ==
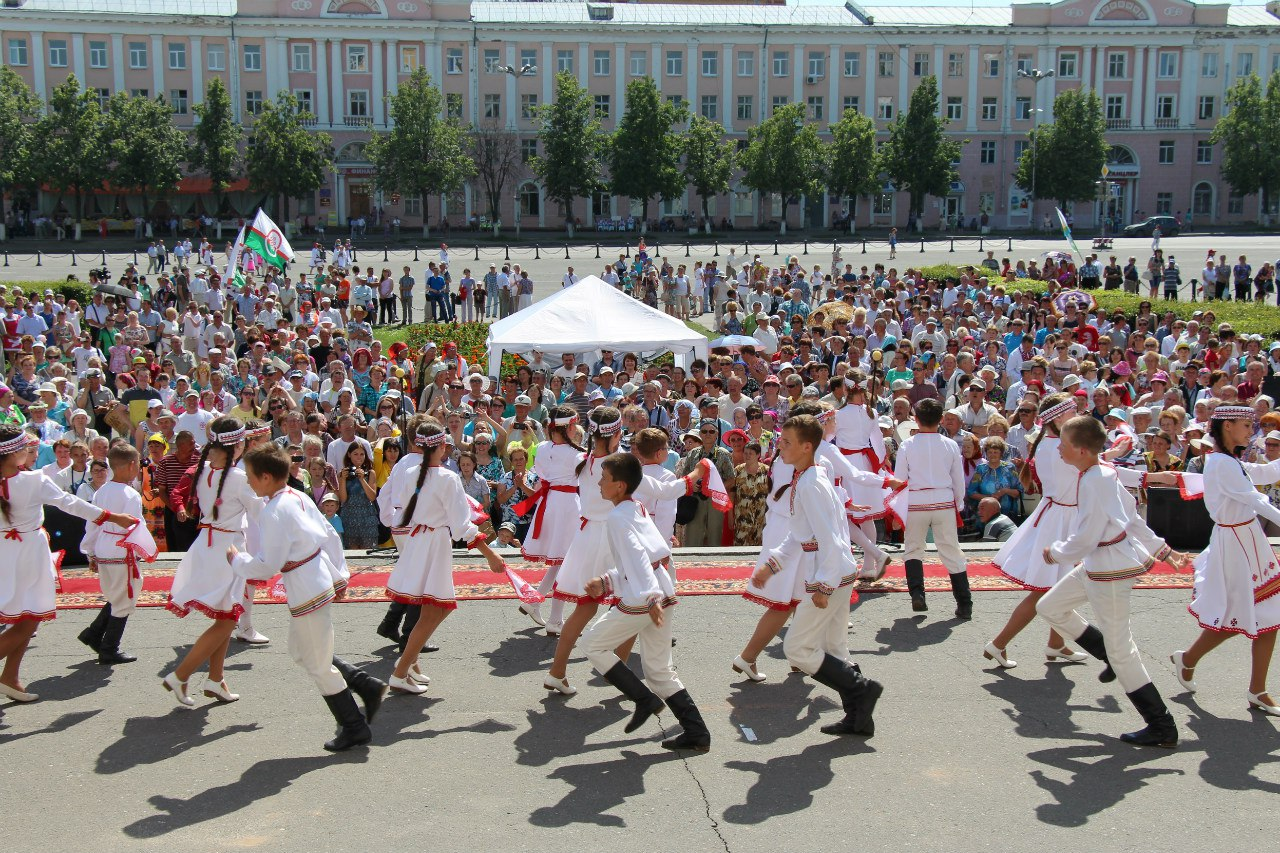
Mari people in Yoshkar-Ola

There are many museums located throughout the territory of the republic. The largest ones include the National Museum, the Museum of History, and the Museum of Fine Arts in Yoshkar-Ola; the Museum of Arts and History, the Ethnographic Open-Air Museum, and the Merchant Life Museum in Kozmodemyansk; and the Sheremetyev Castle Museum-reserve in Yurino. There are also museums dedicated to the poet Nikolay Mukhin and the composer Ivan Klyuchnikov-Palantay in Yoshkar-Ola and the house-museum of writer Sergei Chavayn in Chavaynur.

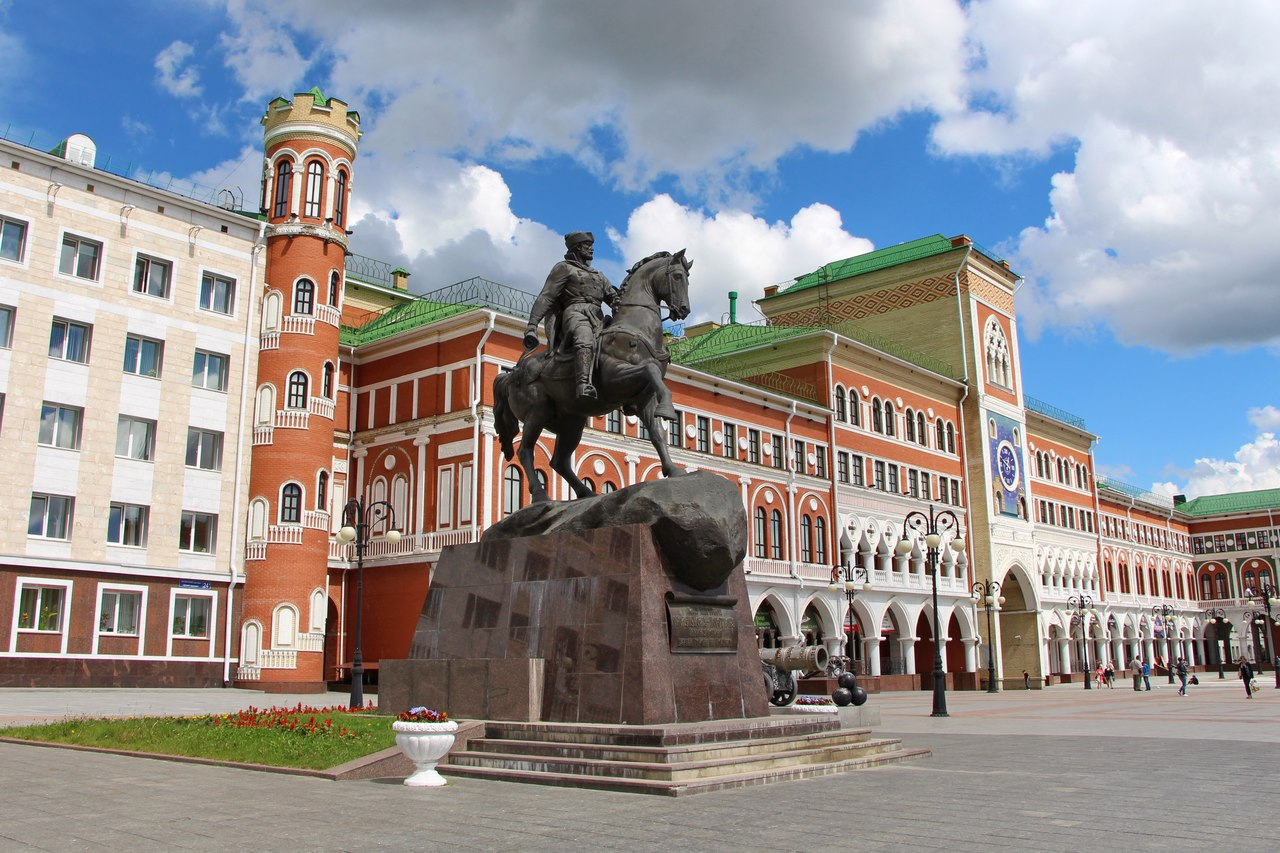
The National Art Museum of the Mari El Republic

Five theaters are located in Yoshkar-Ola with performances in both the Russian and Mari languages.

== Notable people ==
- Ivan Palantai, first Mari composer
- Valentin Kolumb, poet
- Shabdar Osyp, author
- Andrei Eshpai, composer, pianist

== See also ==
- Mari National Rebirth Party "Ushem"

== Sources ==
- 24 июня 1995 г. «Конституция Республики Марий Эл», в ред. Закона №21-З от 31 июля 2014 г. «О поправке 59 к Конституции Республики Марий Эл». Вступил в силу 7 июля 1995 г. (за исключением отдельных положений). Опубликован: "Марийская правда", 7 июля 1995 г. (June 24, 1995 Constitution of the Mari El Republic, as amended by the Law #21-Z of July 31, 2014 On Amendment 59 to the Constitution of the Mari El Republic. Effective as of July 7, 1995 (with the exception of several clauses).).
