= Coat of arms of Mari El =

Coat of arms of the Mari El Republic
- Armiger: Yury Zaitsev, Head of the Mari El Republic
- Adopted: 2001

The national emblem of the Mari El Republic was adopted in 2011 by the government of the Republic of Mari El.

== History ==
Emblem of the Mari Autonomous Soviet Socialist Republic
- Armiger: Mari Autonomous Soviet Socialist Republic
- Adopted: 21 July 1937
- Crest: Red star
- Supporters: Wheat and Cotton
- Motto: (1937–1972); Чыла элласе пролетарий-шамыч, ушныза! (1972–1978); Чыла элысе пролетарий-влак, ушныза! (1978–1993); Чыла элласе пролетарий-влак, ушныза! (Mari) Пролетарии всех стран, соединяйтесь! (Russian) "Workers of the world, unite!"

The emblem of the Mari Autonomous Soviet Socialist Republic (Mari ASSR) adopted in 1937 was identical to the emblem of the RSFSR with the addition of the corresponding inscriptions in the Mari language. The name of the republic in the national language had the form: "Марийский АССР", and the motto: "Чыла элласе пролетарий-шамыч, ушныза!". This was confirmed in the Article 111 of the 1937 Constitution of the Mari ASSR, which was adopted on 21 July 1937.

=== First revision ===
In 1972, the motto on the emblem changed. The motto on the emblem changed to "ЧЫЛА ЭЛЫСЕ ПРОЛЕТАРИЙ-ВЛАК УШНЫЗА!".

==== Second revision ====
The Extraordinary IX Session of the Supreme Council of the 9th Supreme Soviet of the Mari ASSR on May 30, 1978, adopted a new Constitution of the republic. The description of the emblem was amended, with a red star added. This was confirmed by the Regulations on the State Emblem of the Mari ASSR, which were approved by the Decree of the Presidium of the Supreme Council of the Mari ASSR on August 21, 1981.

The inscription of the emblem underwent a minor change, and was changed to "ЧЫЛА ЭЛЛАСЕ ПРОЛЕТАРИЙ-ВЛАК УШНЫЗА!".

== Gallery ==
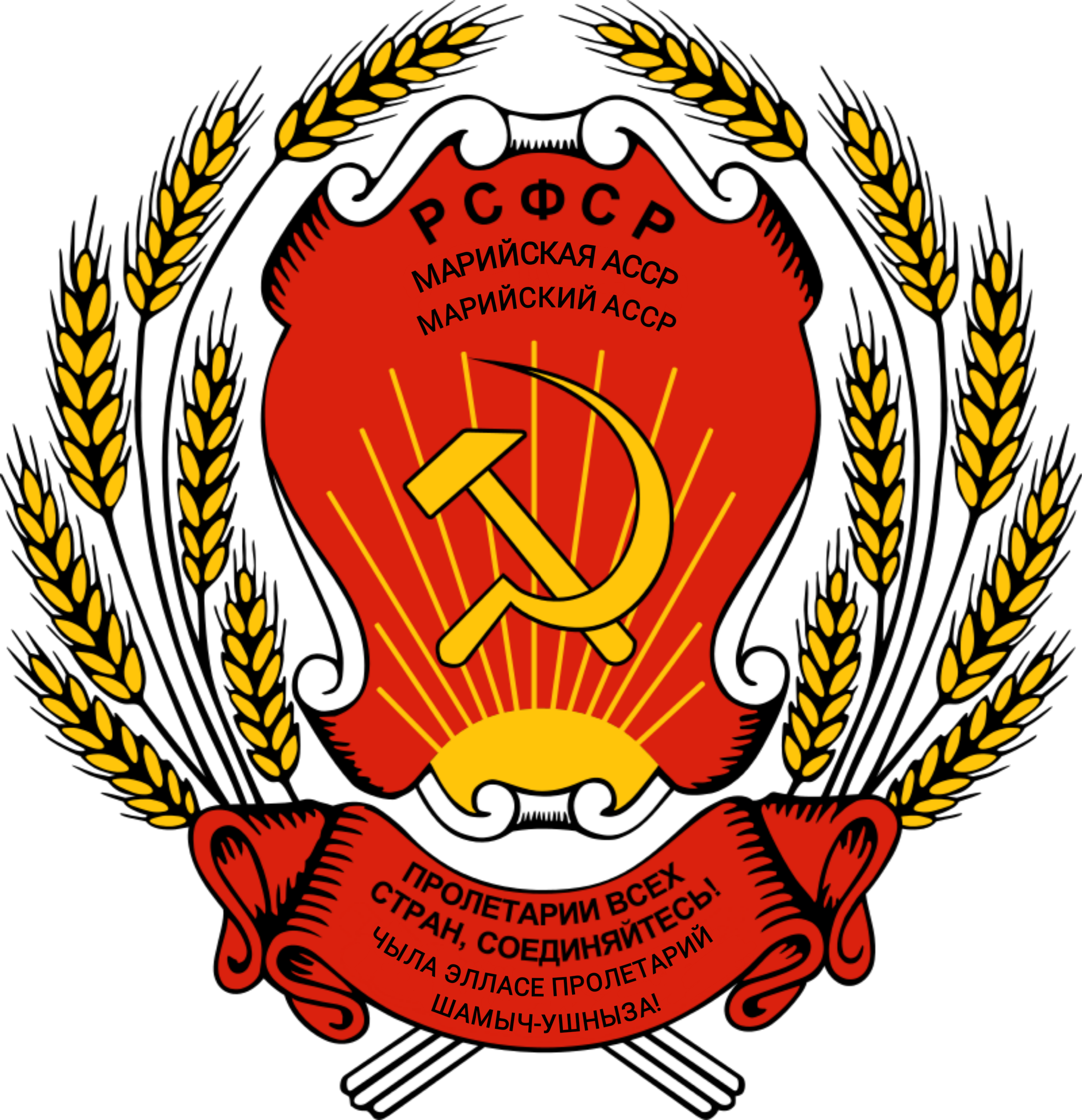
Emblem of the Mari ASSR (1937–1972)

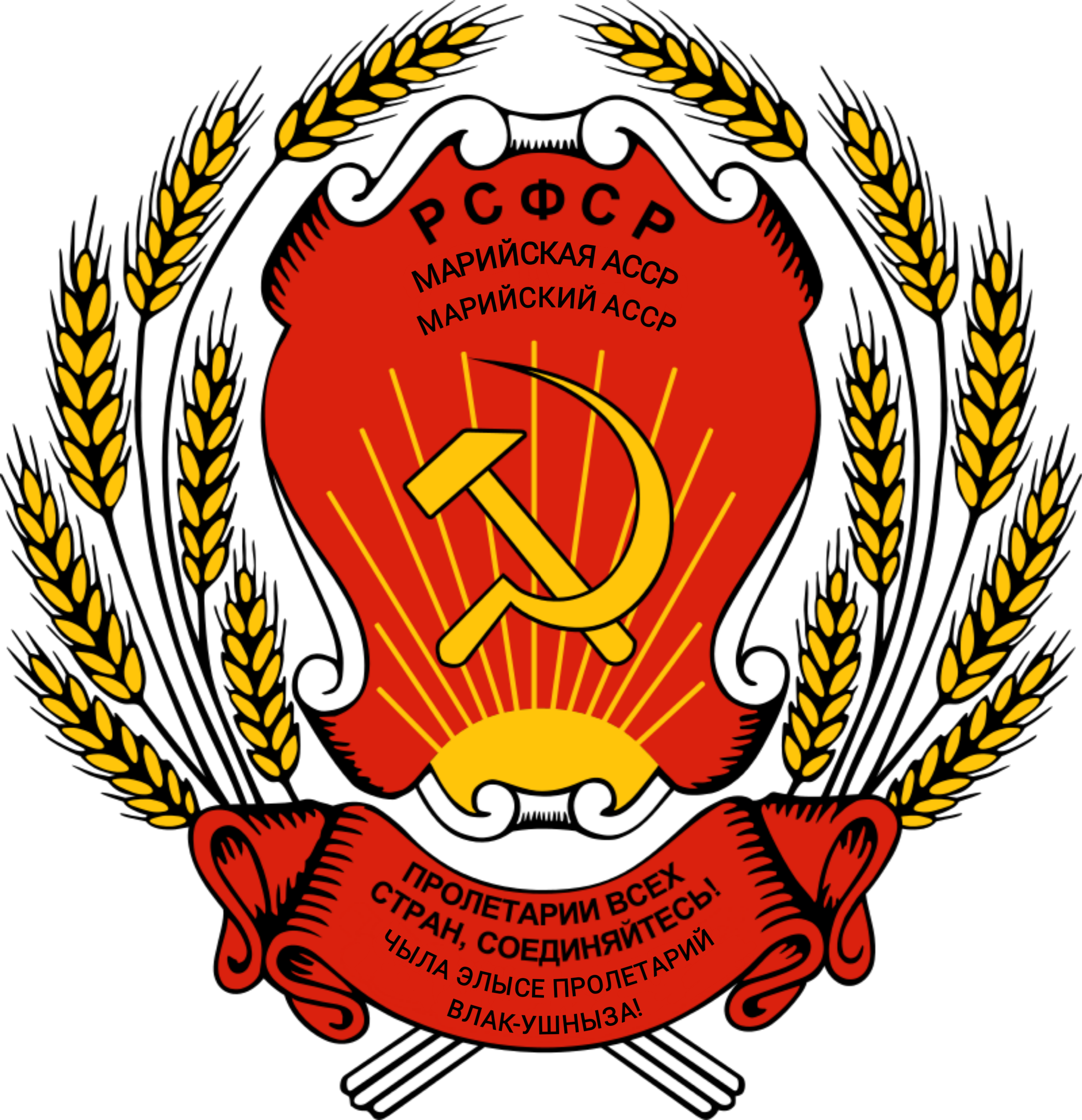
Emblem of the Mari ASSR (1972–1978)

Emblem of the Mari ASSR (1978–1992) and the Mari El Republic (1992–1993)

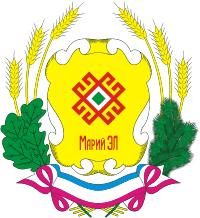
Emblem of the Mari El Republic (1993–2006)

Emblem of the Mari El Republic (2006–2011)
