= Volga State University of Technology =

Technical university in Russia

- Поволжский государственный технологический университет
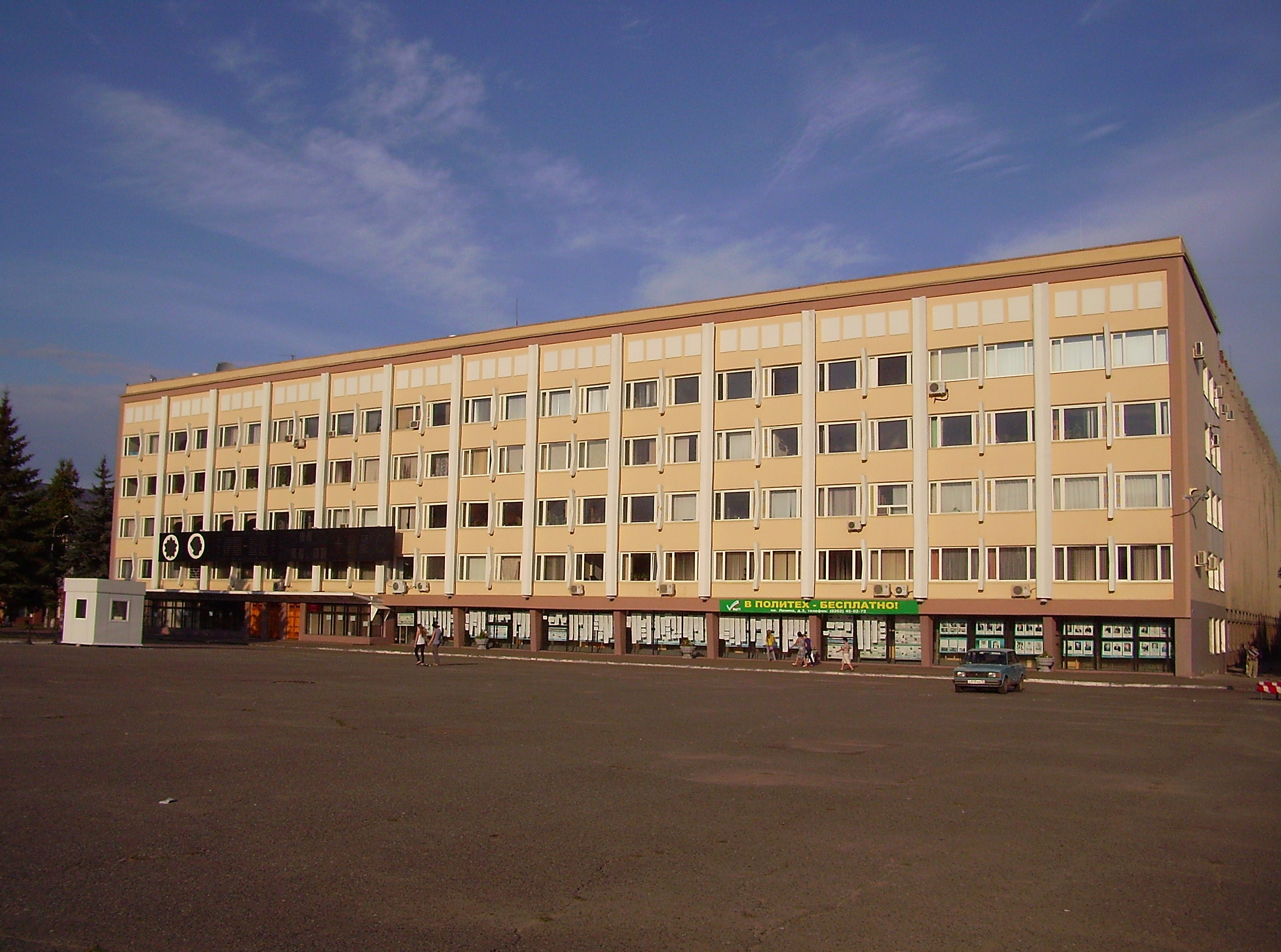
- Motto: Традиции, качество, перспектива (Russian)
- Motto in English: Traditions, quality, perspective
- Type: Public
- Established: 1932
- Rector: Viktor Shebashev
- Location: (Russia) Yoshkar-Ola, Russia; 56°37′49.90″N 47°53′34.75″E
- Colours
- Website: eng.volgatech.net

Volga State University of Technology (formerly Mari State Technical University) (Russian: Пово́лжский госуда́рственный технологи́ческий университе́т), previously known as MarSTU (Russian: МарГТУ), is the first technical, and one of the first institutions of higher education in the republic of Mari El.

== Names ==
- 1932–68 – Povolzhskiy Forestry Engineering Institute
- 1968–82 – Mari Polytechnic Institute named after M. Gorky
- 1982–95 – Mari Awarded with the Order of People's Friendship Polytechnic Institute named after M. Gorky
- 1995–2012 – Mari State Technical University
- 2012–present – Volga State University of Technology

== Departments ==
- Woodworking Technology Department
  - Standardization and Certification
  - Forest Engineering
  - Woodworking Technology
- Machine-Building Department
  - Agricultural Mechanization
  - Industrial Heat-and-Power Engineering
  - Forest Industry Machinery
  - Materials Science and Technology of Emerging Materials
  - Machine-Building Technology
  - Maintenance of Transportation and Production Equipment (in Wood-Chemical Industry)
  - Transportation Security and Management
- Radio Engineering Department
  - Medical-Biological Engineering
  - Design and Technology of Computing Systems
  - Radio Engineering
  - Radio Communication and Broadcasting
  - Electronics and Nanoelectronics
  - Management and Information Science in Engineering Systems
  - Quality Management
- Civil Engineering Department
  - Civil Engineering
  - Building Design
  - Real Estate Expertise and Management
  - Highways and Aerodromes
- Information Science and Computer Engineering Department
  - Information Security
  - Computer Engineering
  - Programming
- Forestry and Ecology Department
  - Nature Management
  - Forestry
  - Landscape Architecture
- Nature Protection, Management and Water Conservation Department
  - Environmental Safety in Technosphere
  - Water Multiple Use and Conservation
- Social Studies Department Department
  - Tourism and Service
  - Social Policy
- Administration and Management Department
  - Marketing
  - Business Administration in Agricultural and Industrial Sectors
  - Public Administration
  - Company Management
- Economics Department
  - Finances
  - Taxation
  - Accountancy Studies and Audit
  - Mathematical Methods in Economics
  - Economics and Management (in Wood-Chemical Sector)
  - Application Informatics (in Economics)
