= Mari Regional Committee of the Communist Party of the Soviet Union =

The First Secretary of the Mari regional branch of the Communist Party of the Soviet Union was the position of highest authority in the Mari AO (1920–1936) and the Mari ASSR (1936–1991) in the Russian SFSR of the Soviet Union. The position was created on February 24, 1921, and abolished on August 25, 1991. The First Secretary was a de facto appointed position usually by the Politburo or the General Secretary himself.

== List of First Secretaries of the Mari Communist Party ==
Name	Term of Office		Life years
Name	Start	End	Life years
First Secretaries of the Communist Party
Aleksandr Bolodurin	February 24, 1921	August 15, 1921	1895–1926
Nikolay Butenin	August 18, 1921	March 15, 1922	1884–1938
Nikolay Yezhov	March 15, 1922	November 1922	1895–1940
Pyotr Lezhnyev-Finkovsky (Note: Acting to March 1923)	November 1922	June 21, 1923	
Ivan Ivanov	June 21, 1923	December 10, 1926	
Vasily Kulikov	December 10, 1926	July 27, 1929	1892–?
Sergey Kutuzov	July 30, 1929	May 22, 1930	1882–?
Ali Geydar Shirvani (Mustafabekov)	May 1930	January 10, 1935	1896–1938
Cheslav Vrublevski	January 10, 1935	November 1937	1900–?
Zinovy Zhadnov (Note: Acting)	November 1937	May 20, 1938	1904–1938
Vasily Arkhipov (Note: Acting to July 11, 1938)	May 20, 1938	February 26, 1939	1908–?
Veniamin Kushnarev	March 2, 1939	April 30, 1942	
Fyodor Navozov	April 30, 1942	July 9, 1945	1910–?
Ivan Kolokolkin	July 9, 1945	September 1948	1905–1969
Grigory Kondratyev	September 1948	October 4, 1951	1912–1993
Aleksey Spiridonov	October 4, 1951	December 28, 1957	1909–1988
Georgy Pavlov	December 29, 1957	November 28, 1963	1910–1991
Pyotr Urayev	November 29, 1963	July 22, 1967	1910–1967
Viktor Nikonov	August 4, 1967	September 5, 1979	1929–1993
Ivan Gusev	September 5, 1979	January 16, 1981	1930–1988
Grigory Posibyev	January 16, 1981	August 25, 1991	1935–2002

== See also ==
- Mari Autonomous Oblast
- Mari Autonomous Soviet Socialist Republic

== Sources ==
- World Statesmen.org
