= Mari Autonomous Oblast =

Region of Soviet Russia in 1920–1936

Mari Autonomous Oblast Марийская автономная область (Russian) Марий автоном вел (Meadow Mari)
- Autonomous oblast of the Russian SFSR
- 1920–1936
- Capital: Krasnokokshaysk
- Historical era: Interwar period
  - Established: 1920
  - Disestablished: 1936
Preceded by	Succeeded by
Tsaryovokokshaysky Uyezd	Mari ASSR
- Today part of: Mari El

The Mari Autonomous Oblast was created on November 4, 1920, as a region of the Russian Soviet Federative Socialist Republic. In 1936 it was re-established as the Mari Autonomous Soviet Socialist Republic, which dissolved in 1990, then developing into the modern Mari El Republic within Russian Federation.

The Oblast was largely populated by the Mari people. Events in its early history include the Russian famine of 1921–22 and the 1921 Mari wildfires.

== History ==
The Mari Autonomous Okrug was formed on November 4, 1920 as an autonomous territorial entity for the mountain and meadow Mari. Initially it was divided into 3 cantons, later their number increased to 9.

On July 15, 1929, the Mari Autonomous Region became part of the newly formed Nizhny Novgorod (since 1932 - Gorky) Territory.

As of October 1, 1931, there were 9 districts in the region:

Gorno-Mari national region Zvenigovsky district city of Yoshkar-Ola Mari-Turek district Morkinsky district Novo-Toryalsky district Orsha district Sernur district Yurinsky National District In 9 districts there were 247 village councils, 2 cities (Yoshkar-Ola - 7600 inhabitants, 01/01/1931, Kozmodemyansk - 8315 inhabitants), 2 workers' settlements (working village Yurino - 4586 inhabitants, working village Zvenigovo - 2482 inhabitants), 2795 rural settlements ... The urban population is 24 700 people. (4.8%).

In 1931-1932, a regional division was introduced.

On December 5, 1936, the Gorky Territory was abolished. According to the Constitution of 1936, the Mari Autonomous Region was transformed into the Mari ASSR, which is directly part of the RSFSR .

== See also ==
- First Secretary of the Mari Communist Party
