= Valentin Kolumb =

Valentin Khristoforovich Kolumb
- Валентин Христофорович Колумб
- Born: 3 May 1935; Mizener, Morkinsky District, Soviet Union
- Died: 8 December 1974 (aged 39)
- Occupations: poet; translator
- Parent: Khristofor Kolumb

Valentin Khristoforovich Kolumb (Mari and Russian: Валентин Христофорович Колумб, 3 May 1935, Mizener - 8 December 1974) was a Mari poet.

He was also a translator, translating works of Johann Wolfgang von Goethe, William Shakespeare, Sándor Petőfi, Nikolay Nekrasov, Alexander Blok, Sergei Yesenin, Aleksandr Tvardovsky and others into Mari.

== Sources ==
- (in Russian) 80th birth anniversary article
