= Valery Komissarov =

Russian TV host and politician

- Валерий Комиссаров
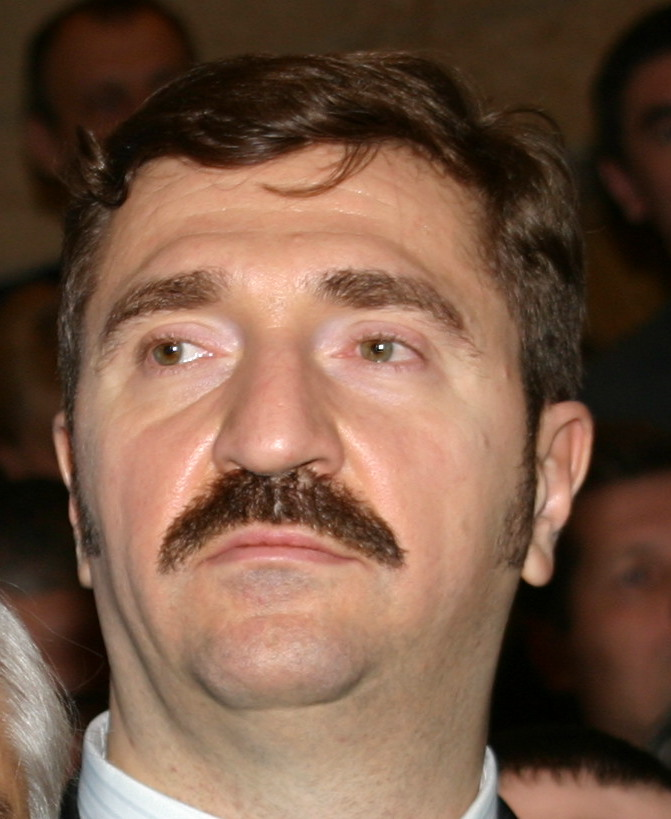
- Born: Valery Yakovlevich Komissarov; 12 April 1965 (age 61); Kharkiv, Ukrainian SSR, Soviet Union
- Education: MISiS
- Occupations: TV and internet content author, producer, director, and host
- Years active: 1987–present
- Spouse: Alla Komissarova
- Children: 5

Valery Yakovlevich Komissarov (Russian: Вале́рий Я́ковлевич Комисса́ров; born 12 April 1965) is a host, producer, director, and screenwriter of numerous television shows. Financial Times named him “the father of Russian reality show". He is a former member of the party United Russia, former State Duma deputy (1999–2011).

== Biography ==
Komissarov was born on April 12, 1965, in Kharkiv (former USSR, now Ukraine). In 1987, he graduated from Moscow Institute of Steel and Alloys, and earned a diploma in directing from the Institute for Advanced Training of Television and Radio Broadcasting Workers. In 1987, he started working at the Lublin Casting and Mechanical Plant and at the State Institute for the Design of Metallurgical Enterprises (GIPROMEZ). In 1988, he was hired as an administrator for the Youth Editorial Board at the Central Television and Radio Broadcasting Company of the USSR. In 1989–1992, he worked as a special correspondent for the then-popular television program Outlook Vzglyad and co-wrote Visiting a Fairy Tale, a television series for children.

From November 1993 to March 1995, Komissarov created and hosted the Channel of Illusions, a television show produced by ATV on Channel 1 Ostankino. Then he moved to the Moscow Television Channel (MTK), where, from April 1995 to July 1996, he hosted shows Men’s and Women's Stories and The Plainspoken Men’s Club. He then created and hosted the television show My Family, which aired from July 1996 on the television network ORT and from January 1998 to August 2003 on RTR (which later was renamed Rossiya and still later became Rossiya-1). He also wrote and hosted the shows Mary's Grove (1998) and The Ideal Man (2001) on the same network.

He went on to write and produce multiple television shows, including To Your Health!, Family News, What Does A Woman Want?”, “Girl's Tears”, The Burden Of Money, House, and Personal News Service a talk show Okna (Windows) and reality show Dom-2 (House 2)

In 2011, Komissarov started airing the reality show Mother in Law on the television network Peretz. His television show Machine and his sketch show Happy End were aired on the same network, while the television network "Ю" ran his daily talk show I am right (#Yaprava). From November 16 to December 30, 2015, he directed and hosted Our Man, a television show aired on Russia-1.

Komissarov lives with his wife, four daughters and one son.
