= Alexander Yevstifeyev =

Russian politician and lawyer (1958–2024)

- Александр Евстифеев
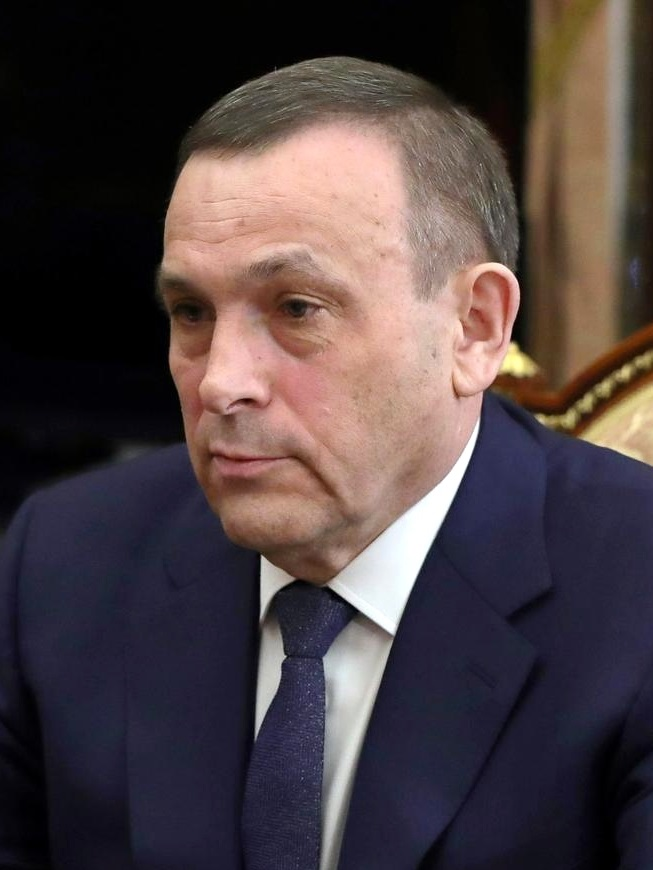
- Yevstifeyev in 2017

4th Head of the Mari El Republic
- In office 21 September 2017 – 10 May 2022; Acting: 6 April 2017 – 21 September 2017
- Preceded by: Leonid Markelov
- Succeeded by: Yury Zaitsev (acting)

Russian Federation Senator from Yamalo-Nenets Autonomous Okrug
- In office 11 January 2002 – 28 January 2004
- Succeeded by: Vladimir Spitsnadel

Personal details
- Born: 14 May 1958 Bredy, Chelyabinsk Oblast, Russian SFSR, USSR
- Died: 9 September 2024 (aged 66)
- Party: Independent
- Education: Ural State Law University

Alexander Alexandrovich Yevstifeyev (Russian: Александр Александрович Евстифеев; 14 May 1958 – 9 September 2024) was a Russian politician and jurist. From 21 September 2017 to 10 May 2022 he served as the Head of the Mari El Republic.

== Early life ==
Yevstifeyev was born in the settlement of Bredy in Chelyabinsk Oblast. His father worked as a cashier in the State Bank of the USSR, and his mother was a nurse. After finishing grade school, he worked in highway management for Chelyabinsk Oblast.

In 1980 Yevstifeyev graduated from the Sverdlovsk Law Institute, and in 1984 he finished his postgraduate studies.

== Career ==
Between 1980 and 2000, he worked at the Sverdlovsk Law Institute as a lecturer, Associate Professor, Professor of Civil Law, Dean of the Investigation Department, Director of the Institute of justice and Ural State Law Academy (now Institute of justice, Ural State Law University).

From 2000 to 2002, he held the post of Deputy Plenipotentiary representative of RF President in the Volga Federal District, where he coordinated the harmonization of laws of the fifteen regions of the Russian Federation.

From 2002 to 2004, he was a Senator, representing Yamalo-Nenets Autonomous Okrug.

From 2004 to 2012, he was the Chairman of the Ninth Arbitration Appeals Court that performs judicial acts adopted by Arbitration Court of Moscow, as well as Deputy Chairman of the Supreme Qualification Collegium of judges. From 2014 to 2017, he was the Chairman of the Arbitration Court of the Moscow Oblast.

=== Head of Mari El ===
On 6 April 2017, by the decree of the President of Russia, he was appointed acting Head of the Mari El Republic.

On 19 May 2017, Yevstifeyev declared his intent to run for the position of the Head of the Republic. Despite the fact that he was a non-partisan, he participated in the primaries of United Russia for the party nomination. Yevstifeyev was supported by the Communist Party.

On 10 September 2017, Yevstifeyev won the election in a landslide victory, gaining 88.27% of the votes.

On 21 September he assumed the position of Head of the Mari El Republic.

On 10 May 2022 announced his resignation.

== Personal life and death ==
Yevstifeyev was married, with two sons. His wife is named Yulia. His eldest son, Artyom, is a graduate of the Moscow Academy of Law and works as an assistant to the special prosecutor. His younger son Alexander is a student at the law faculty of Moscow State University.

Yevstifeyev died on 9 September 2024, at the age of 66.

== Electoral history ==
=== 2017 Head election ===
Candidates	Party	Votes	%
Alexander Yevstifeyev	United Russia	208,855	88.27
Albert Fyodorov	Liberal Democratic Party	11,982	5.06
Natalia Glushenko	A Just Russia	8,232	3.48
Valentina Zlobina	Party of Pensioners	4,159	1.76
Source: Сводная таблица результатов выборов
