= Yury Zaitsev (politician) =

Russian politician (born 1970)

- Юрий Зайцев
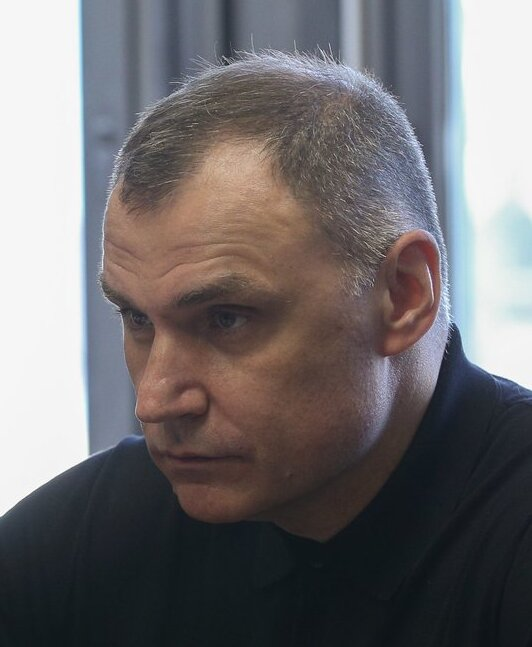
- Zaitsev in 2022

Head of Mari El
- Incumbent
- Assumed office 23 September 2022
- Preceded by: Alexander Yevstifeyev

Head of Mari El (acting)
- In office 10 May 2022 – 23 September 2022

Chairman of the Government of Republic of Kalmykia
- In office 14 October 2019 – 10 May 2022
- Governor: Batu Khasikov
- Preceded by: Igor Zotov

Personal details
- Born: Yury Viktorovich Zaitsev; 16 December 1970 (age 55) Monino, Moscow Oblast, Soviet Union
- Party: United Russia

Yury Viktorovich Zaitsev (Russian: Юрий Викторович Зайцев; born 16 December 1970) is a Russian politician and statesman, who is currently the acting Head of Mari El since 10 May 2022.

== Biography ==
Zaitsev is of Russian descent. He was born on 16 December 1970 in the city of Monino, in Moscow Oblast.

He graduated from the Military Institute of the Ministry of Defense of the USSR with a degree in Foreign Language with the qualification of Interpreter-Referent, Specialist in the Information and Analytical Field.

He has a PhD in economics.

From February to August 2014, Zaitsev was an adviser, and then the first deputy general director of IDGC JSC of the North Caucasus. Later, he was CEO of the company for five years.

In 2019, he was appointed Chairman of the Government of the Republic of Kalmykia.

On 10 May 2022, Russian President Vladimir Putin appointed Zaitsev as the acting head of Mari El in connection with the resignation of the previous head of the region Alexander Yevstifeyev.

== Personal life ==
Zaitsev is married and has a son.

=== Sanctions ===
On February 24, 2023, Zaytsev was sanctioned by the U.S. On April 1, he was added to Ukraine's sanctions list.
