= State Assembly of the Mari El Republic =

Regional parliament of Mari El, Russia

State Assembly of the Mari El Republic Государственное Собрание Республики Марий Эл
- 8th legislature

Type
- Type: Unicameral

Leadership
- Chairman: Anatoly Smirnov, United Russia

Structure
- Seats: 52
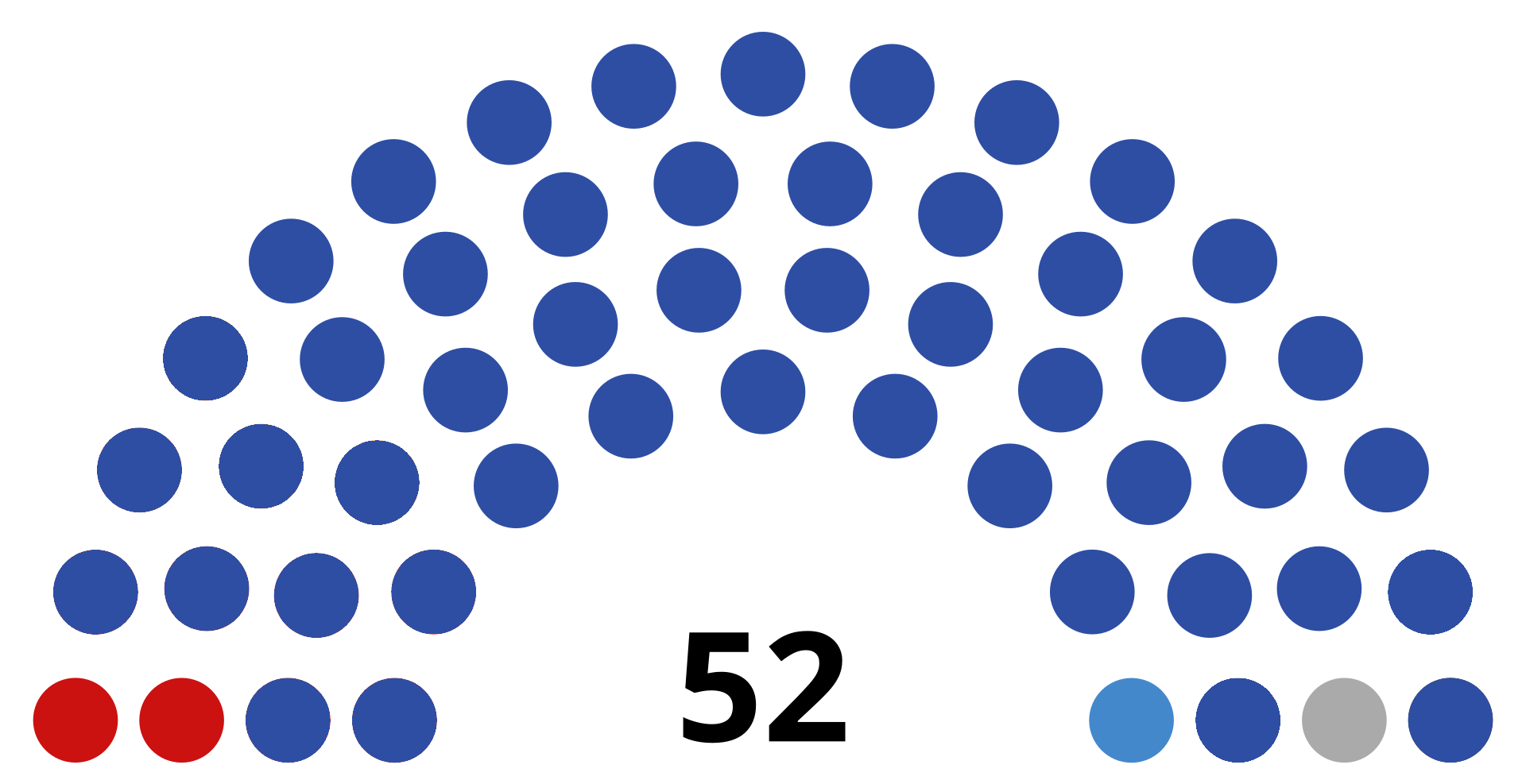
- Political groups: United Russia (48) CPRF (2); LDPR (1) Independent (1)

Elections
- Voting system: Mixed
- Last election: 8 September 2024
- Next election: 2029

Meeting place
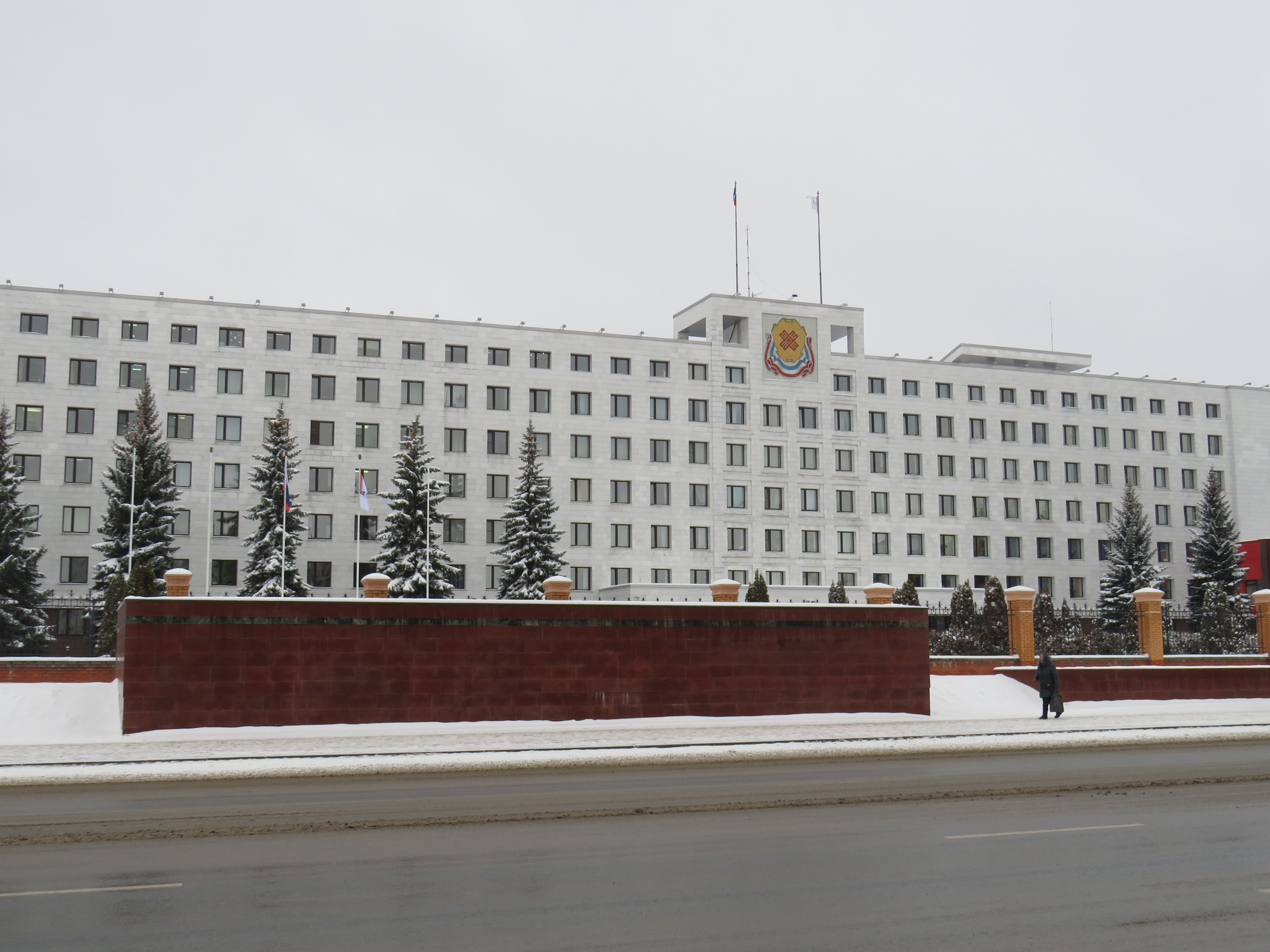
- 29 Leninsky Prospekt, Yoshkar-Ola

Website
- parliament.mari.ru

The State Assembly of the Mari El Republic (Meadow Mari: Марий Эл Республикысе Кугыжаныш Погын; Russian: Государственное Собрание Республики Марий Эл) is the regional parliament of Mari El, a federal subject of Russia. A total of 52 deputies are elected for five-year terms. 26 deputies are elected by single-member constituencies and another 26 are elected in party lists.

The State Assembly approves ministers, who are nominated by the republic's President.

The presiding officer is the Chairman of the State Assembly.

== Elections ==
=== 2019 ===
Party	%	Seats
United Russia	37.49	33
Communist Party of the Russian Federation	26.92	9
Liberal Democratic Party of Russia	15.78	3
A Just Russia	7.78	3
Russian Party of Pensioners for Social Justice	4.93	0
Communists of Russia	4.04	0
Registered voters/turnout	35.03	

=== 2024 ===
Party	%	Seats
United Russia	61.23	48
Communist Party of the Russian Federation	11.57	2
Liberal Democratic Party of Russia	8.65	1
A Just Russia	4.86	0
New People	4.35	0
Russian Party of Pensioners for Social Justice	4.12	0
Communists of Russia	3.77	0
Registered voters/turnout	38.72	

== List of chairmen ==
=== Supreme Council ===
Name	Period
Grigory Posibeyev	April 26, 1990 – August 21, 1990
Vladislav Zotin	August 22, 1990 – December 24, 1991
Yury Minakov	December 24, 1991 – December 13, 1993

=== State Assembly ===
Name	Period
Anatoly Smirnov	January 6, 1994 – October 6, 1996
Mikhail Zhukov	November 6, 1996 – October 8, 2000
Yury Minakov	October 27, 2000 – October 10, 2004; November 4, 2004 – October 11, 2009; October 28, 2009 – September 14, 2014; October 2, 2014–Incumbent
