= Leonid Markelov =

Russian politician and lawyer

- Леонид Маркелов
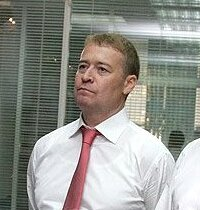
- Markelov in 2010

3rd Head (formerly President) of Mari El
- In office 14 January 2001 – 6 April 2017
- Preceded by: Vyacheslav Kislitsyn
- Succeeded by: Alexander Yevstifeyev

Personal details
- Born: June 25, 1963 (age 62) Moscow, RSFSR, USSR
- Party: LDPR (1995–200?), United Russia (2007–2017)
- Spouse: Irina Konstantinova Markelova
- Profession: Lawyer

Leonid Igorevich Markelov (Russian: Леонид Игоревич Маркелов; born 1963) is a Russian politician and lawyer, who is the former Head of Mari El. He took office on January 14, 2001, and resigned from office on April 6, 2017. Markelov was later arrested under suspicion of accepting bribes.

== Biography ==
=== Early life ===
Markelov was born to a Russian Orthodox family living in Moscow, as the only child. His father, Igor Markelov was the chief of the USSR Ministry of Agriculture, and his mother was an economist. His father died when Markelov was nine years old, leaving him solely dependent on his mother throughout most of his childhood. He was educated at the Military University of the Ministry of Defence, where he graduated with a degree in law in 1986. He was a member of the Communist Party of the USSR from 1981 to 1991, while at the same time serving in the Soviet army. He was an attorney in 1992, and entered politics in 1999. Markelov is Russian by ethnicity. He is married to Irina Konstantinova Markelova, and together they have a son and a daughter.

=== Presidency ===
Markelov was elected in December 2000 in one of the most contentious elections that occurred in the period between 1991 and 2005 when leaders of Russian administrative divisions were directly elected. In the first round, Markelov came slightly ahead of incumbent Vyacheslav Kislitsyn with Markelov receiving 29% and Kislitsyn receiving 25% in a field of several other candidates. In the runoff two weeks later, Markelov was elected with 59% of the vote. In 1996, Markelov had been defeated by Kislitsyn, receiving 38% of the vote. Markelov was elected to a second 4-year term in 2004, receiving 56% of the vote.

On 6 April 2017, Russian President Vladimir Putin dismissed him as the head of Mari El upon Markelov's request.

=== Criminal case ===
A week later after his resignation Markelov was arrested by the SKR on suspicion of taking a bribe in the amount of ₽235 million. In January 2019, the Prosecutor General's Office approved the indictment. According to this document, Markelov achieved the allocation of ₽5 billion of state support for the Akashevskaya poultry farm, and he received promissory notes for 234 million from its owner as a "gratitude". In late November 2019, the Nizhny Novgorod District Court confiscated Markelov's property for 2.2 billion rubles as acquired with undeclared income (including a shopping mall, 16 cars and gold bars).

On 24 February 2021, the court sentenced Markelov to 13 years in a strict regime colony and a fine of about ₽235 million. In addition, the court decided to deprive Markelov of all state awards and banned him from holding political positions for three years.

== Controversies ==
Markelov is a controversial figure both in Russia and the Finno-Ugric community. He has been criticized by Western media for repressing the indigenous ethnicities of Mari El, and his disregard for human rights and his administration's inability to deal with the economic decay in Mari El.

=== Beatings of political dissidents ===
In early 2005, Markelov drew the ire of the international press when it was alleged that his authorities beat political dissidents and opponents of his governments with iron pipes. Numerous opposition members were beaten badly. No charges were brought to this incident, or for the other crimes of violence.

=== Vladimir Kozlov ===
During 2005, the Mari activist and chief editor Vladimir Kozlov was badly beaten by Markelov's enforcers after he published criticism of Leonid Markelov's politics.
