= Mari Autonomous Soviet Socialist Republic =

Soviet administrative unit in 1936–1991

Coordinates: 56°34′N 47°56′E

Mari Autonomous Soviet Socialist Republic Марийская Автономная Советская Социалистическая Республика
- ASSR of the Russian SFSR; Republic of the Russian Federation
- 1936–1992
- Flag (1978–1990) Emblem (1978–1992)

- Capital: Yoshkar-Ola
- Government
  - Type: Autonomous Soviet Socialist Republic
- History
  - Established: 5 December 1936
  - Sovereignty declared (Renamed to the Mari SSR): 22 October 1990
  - Renamed to the Mari El Republic: 9 December 1992
Preceded by	Succeeded by
Mari AO	Mari El

The Mari Autonomous Soviet Socialist Republic (Mari ASSR) (Mari: Марий Автоном Совет Социализм Республик, Mariy Avtonom Sovet Sotsializm Respublik) was an autonomous republic of the Russian SFSR, succeeding the Mari Autonomous Oblast. When the Soviet Union disintegrated, the Mari ASSR became the Mari El Republic, a federal subject of the Russian Federation.

== History ==
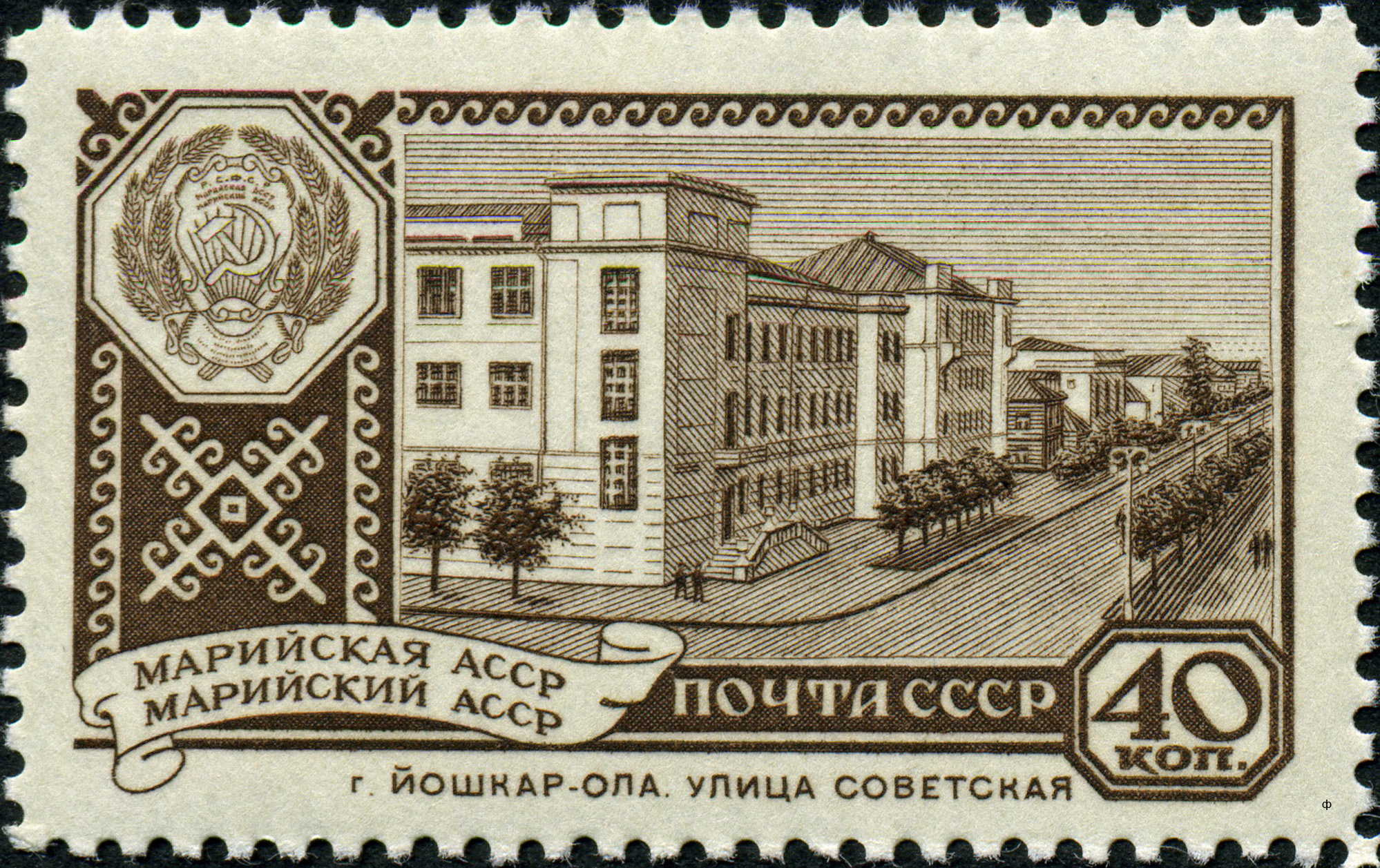
Mari ASSR, Yoshkar-Ola. USSR postage stamp, 1960

The Mari Autonomous Soviet Socialist Republic was formed on 5 December 1936, according to the USSR Constitution of 1936 as a result of the transformation of the Mari Autonomous Oblast (region), created on 4 November 1920, as an autonomous territorial entity for the Mountain Mari and Meadow Mari people. The Mari people initially welcomed the creation of this autonomous oblast because they believed it would lead to the Soviet Union protecting their language and pagan way of life from Christian encroachment. However, under Joseph Stalin, the Soviet Union enforced Russian as the official language on the Mari ASSR and marginalised their religious practices. Stalin also implemented collective farming in the 1930s and forced Maris to leave their villages to work on them to further erode Mari culture.

On 22 October 1990, by decision of the Supreme Soviet of the Mari ASSR, it was transformed into the Mari Soviet Socialist Republic (MSSR). On May 24, 1991, the Congress of People's Deputies of the RSFSR approved this decision, amending the Constitution of the RSFSR of 1978.

On 9 December 1992, the Congress of People's Deputies of the Russian Federation renamed the Mari SSR into the Republic of Mari El, amending Article 71 of the Constitution of the Russian Federation. This amendment entered into force from the moment of publication in the "Rossiyskaya Gazeta" on 12 January 1993.

== Administrative divisions ==
The Mari ASSR included 14 regions.

On the territory of the Mari ASSR there were three cities (Yoshkar-Ola, Volzhsk, Kozmodemyansk) and 14 urban-type settlements.

== National composition ==
According to the 1970 census:

- Russians – 321,000 (46.9%)
- Mari – 299,000 (43.6%)
- Tatars – 40,000 (5.8%)
- Chuvash – 9,000 (1.3%)
- Ukrainians – 5,000 (0.7%)
- Others – 11,000 (1.7%)

== See also ==
- Mari Regional Committee of the Communist Party of the Soviet Union
