= Peledysh Payrem =

Mari holiday

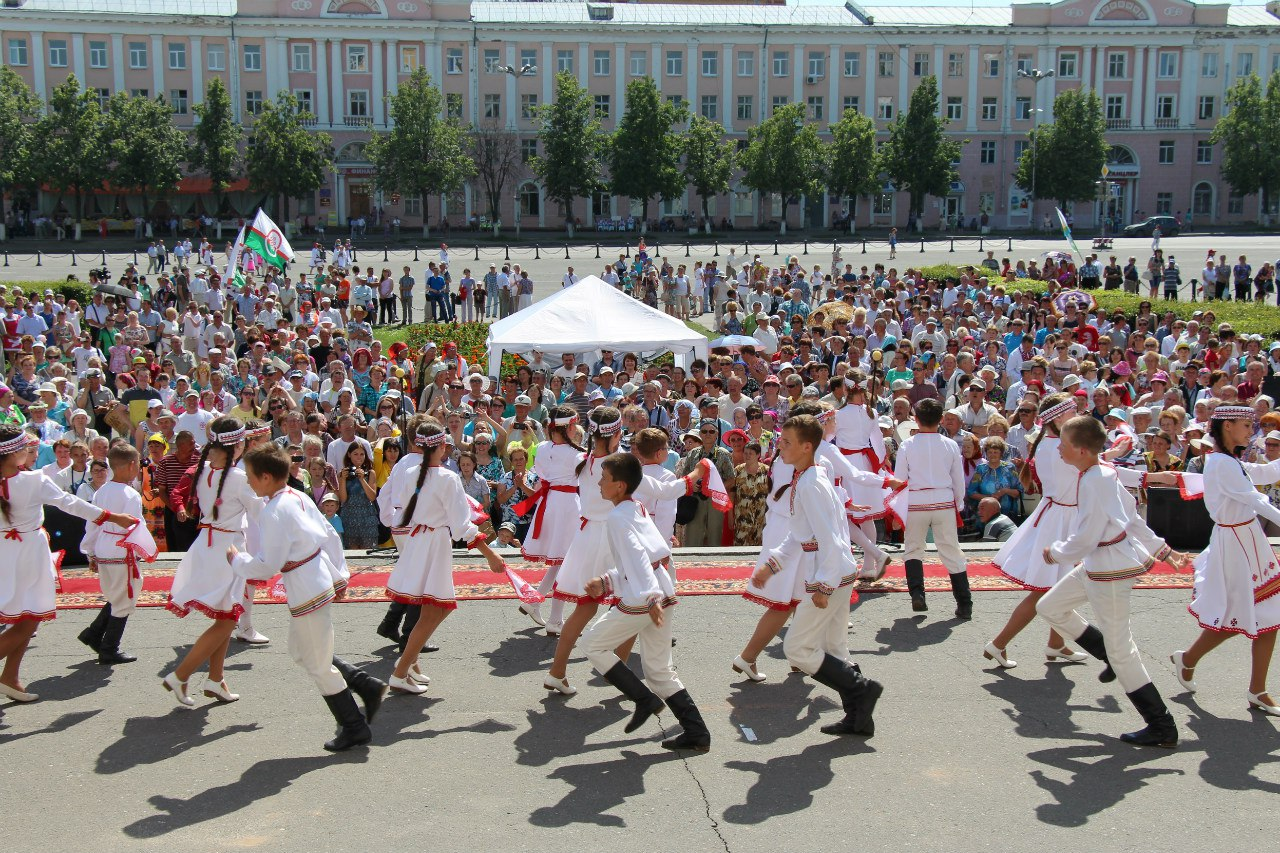
- Children performing in a concert for Peledysh Payrem, Yoshkar-Ola 2015
- Observed by: Mari people
- Celebrations: Traditional religious ceremonies, processions, concerts, games, sports competitions
- Date: Third Saturday in June
- 2027 date: June 19
- Frequency: Annual
- First time: 27 May 1920

Peledysh Payrem (Cyrillic: Пеледыш пайрем; transl. "Festival of Colors" or "Flower Festival") is a holiday celebrated by the Mari people of Russia. It is an official holiday of Mari El Republic. According to Mari State University professor Galina Shkalina, Peledysh Payrem is "an integral part of the Mari national culture".

== History ==
Peledysh Payrem was conceived of by Mari writer Alexander Fedorovich Konakov (1887–1922). A supporter of the October Revolution, he initiated the creation of a new Mari holiday, initially called Yoshkar peledysh payrem ("Red Flower Festival"). The first celebration of Peledysh Payrem was on 27 May 1920, in the village of Sernur. It featured red posters and flags and revolutionary slogans, celebrating the victory of the Bolsheviks.

Yoshkar peledysh payrem grew in popularity, and in 1923 the Mari Regional Executive Committee declared it to be "the People's Revolutionary Day of the workers of the Mari Autonomous Oblast". It was to be celebrated on the Thursday of Semyk, a popular Mari folk holiday, and would be a day of solidarity with workers and revolution. As ethnic religious holidays like Semyk were suppressed, celebration of Yoshkar peledysh payrem was encouraged to supplant them. In 1927, a special commission was created to plan for the Yoshkar peledysh payrem celebration, and it was held in Krasnokokshaisk (soon renamed Yoskhar-Ola). The festival featured children's activities, sports, games, concerts, and a rally.

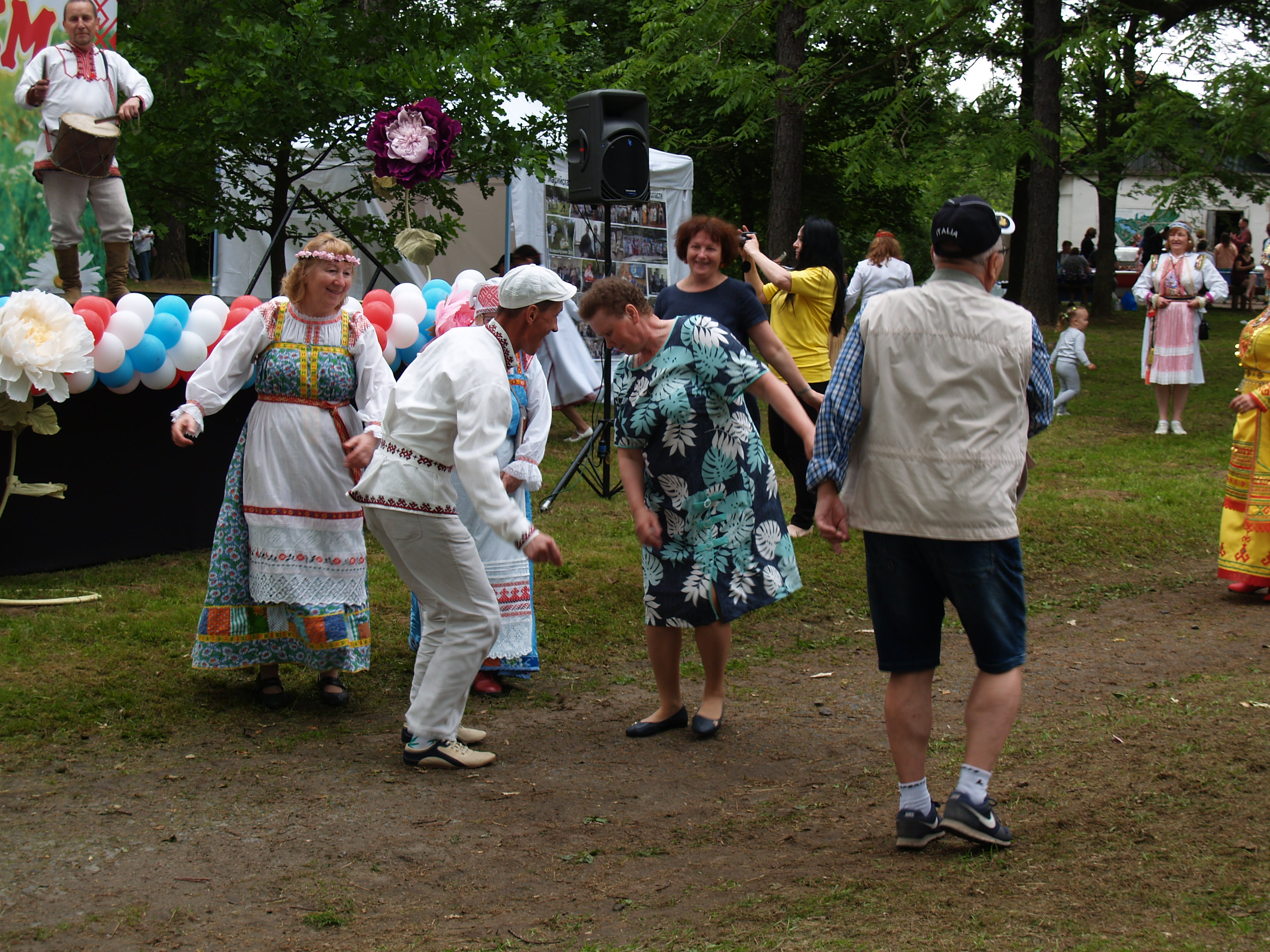
Festivalgoers dancing, 2021

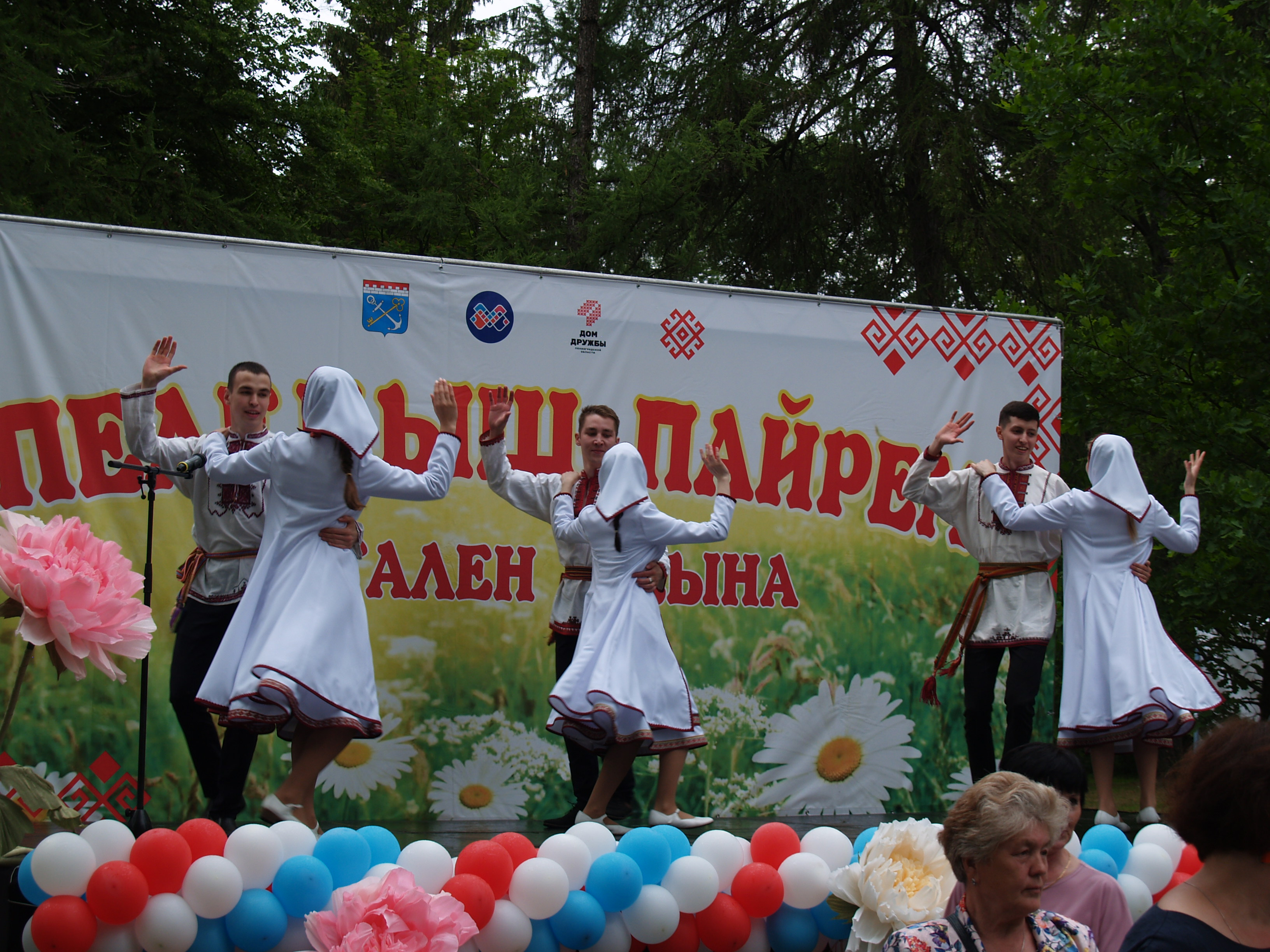
Dance performance, 2021

In 1930, during the consolidation of the Stalin regime, Yoshkar peledysh payrem was canceled despite its popularity. Reviving the holiday was discussed from the mid-1930s, and in 1936 the founding of the Mari Autonomous Soviet Socialist Republic was celebrated with the traditional spring festival Agavayrem and Yoshkar peledysh payrem. However, in 1937 many Mari intellectuals and organizers of the festivals were killed in the Great Purge.

=== Revival ===
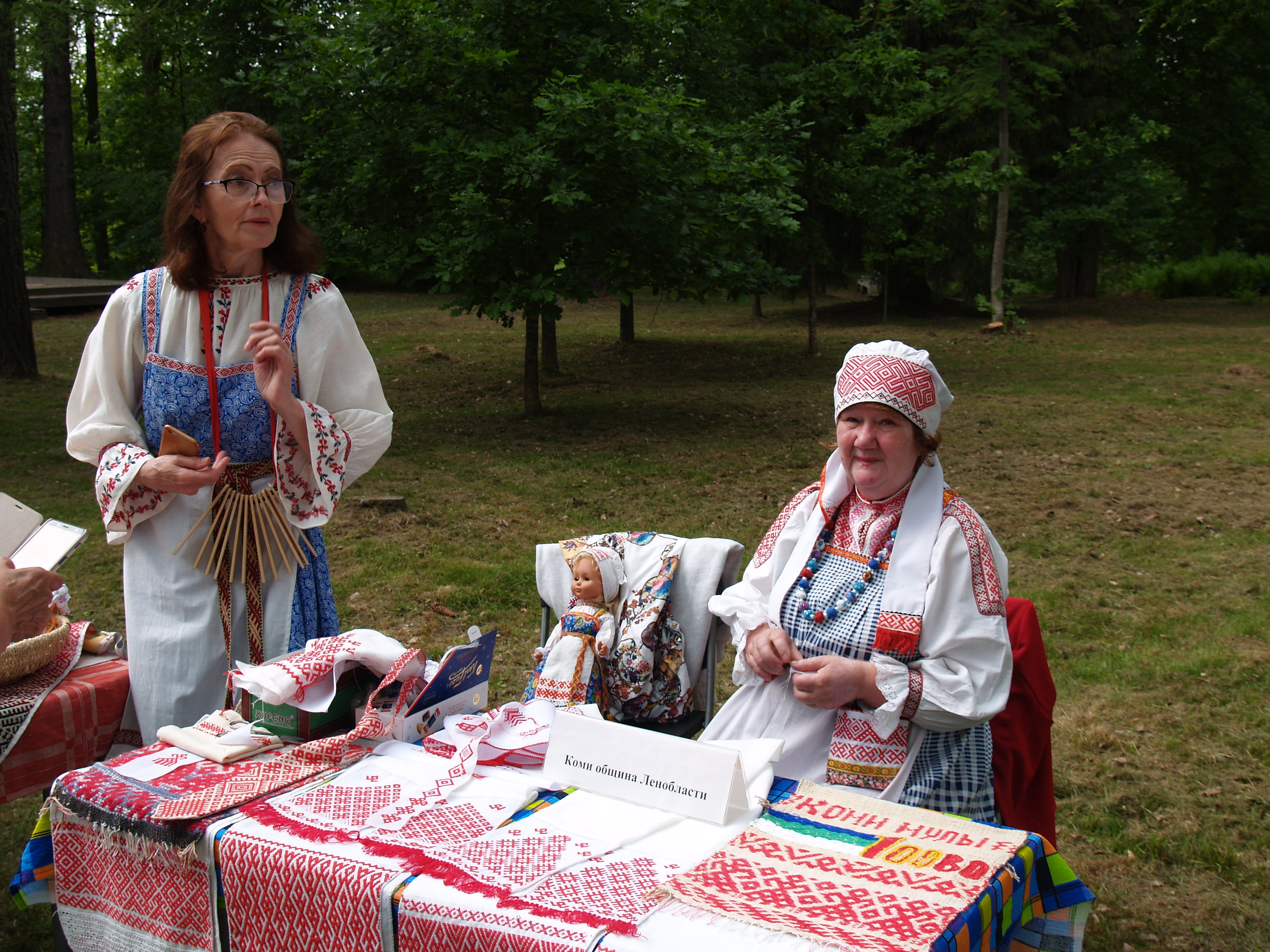
Traditional crafts and costume on display, 2021

In 1960, the festival was once again celebrated under the new name Peledysh Payrem, without the red paraphernalia. It was held in Sernur, with republican officials in attendance. In 1965 it was officially recognized by the government and was to be held on the third Sunday of June. In the 1970s, celebration of the holiday became more consolidated in the capital of Mari El, Yoshkar-Ola.

From 1996 to 2008, Peledysh Payrem (and Sabantuy, a Tatar equivalent) was held on 12 June to coincide with Russia Day. In 2009, it was designated a state holiday in Mari El, and the scheduling was changed to the third Saturday in June, which it remains. Since 2014 the cultural organization Mari Ushem has held a music festival in the village of Shariboksad, which was incorporated into Peledysh Payrem celebrations in 2018.

== Observances ==
In Yoshkar-Ola the celebration begins with the Agavayrem rite at a sacred grove, followed by a festive procession featuring Mari delegations from regions such as Bashkortostan, Tatarstan, Chuvashia, Udmurtia, Nizhny Novgorod, Kirov, Sverdlovsk, and Khanty-Mansia. In rural areas Peledysh Payrem begins with the ceremonial opening of the festival and the raising of flags. In both urban and rural areas there are concerts, games, contests, amusement rides, and sports.
