= Volga region =

Historical region in Russia

Coordinates: 55.0000°N 50.0000°E

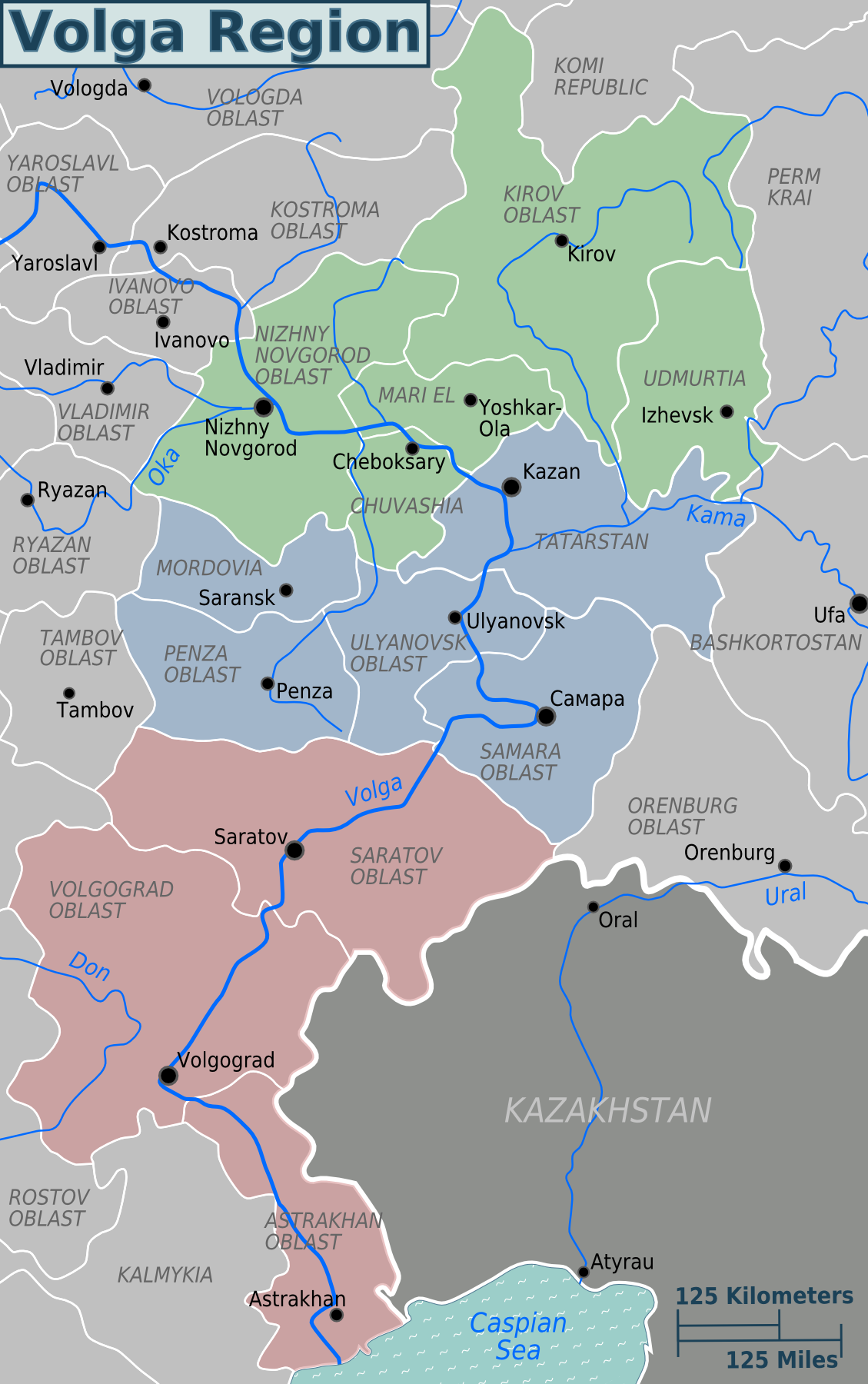
■ Upper Volga ■ Middle Volga ■ Lower Volga

The Volga region, known as the Povolzhye (UK: /pəˈvɔːlʒeɪ/ pə-VAWL-zhay, US: /pəˈvoʊlʒeɪ/ pə-VOHL-zhay; Russian: Поволжье [pɐˈvoɫʐje] lit. 'Along the Volga'), is a historical region in Russia that encompasses the drainage basin of the Volga River, the longest river in Europe, in central and southern European Russia. The Volga region is culturally separated into three sections:

- ■ Upper Volga Region – from the Volga River's source in Tver Oblast to the mouth of the Oka River in Nizhny Novgorod;
- ■ Middle Volga Region – from the mouth of the Oka River to the mouth of the Kama River south of Kazan;
- ■ Lower Volga Region – from the mouth of the Kama River to the Volga Delta in the Caspian Sea, in Astrakhan Oblast.

The geographic boundaries of the region are vague, and the term Volga region is used to refer primarily to the Middle and Lower sections, which are included in the Volga Federal District and Volga economic region.

== Geography ==
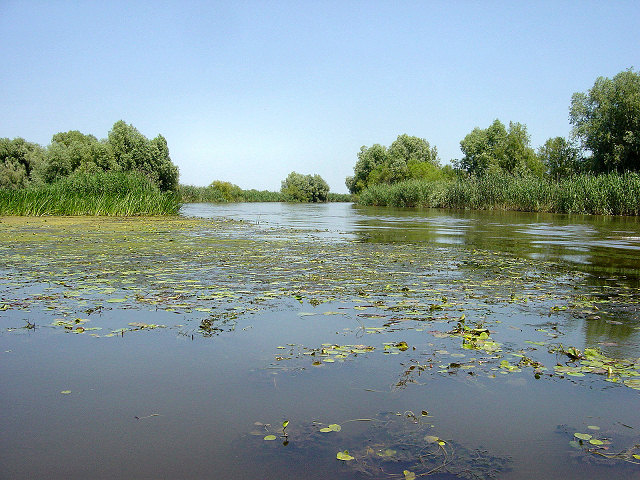
The Volga flows through the East European north-western regions to the Central Asian south-western steppe regions in Povolzhyen Russia. Volga delta in Central Asia

The Volga Region is almost entirely within the East European Plain, with a notable distinction contrasting the elevated western side featuring the Volga Upland, and the eastern side known as Transvolga (Russian: Заволжье, Zavolžje). The latter consists of the elevated High Transvolga and the lowland Low Transvolga. To its southwest, it borders the North Caucasus region. The Idel-Ural region, a collection of six federal subjects between the Volga River and the Ural Mountains, is generally considered as a part of the Volga Region, although the river does not run through each of them. Idel-Ural is within an extensive north-western protrusion of the Volga River's drainage basin, including numerous tributaries such as the Malaya Kokshaga River. It also includes sub-tributaries, such as the Belaya River which joins the Kama River, a tributary of the Volga.

== History ==
According to different sources, the region was mainly inhabited by Slavic, Turkic and Viking people. The Povolzhye played an important part of the emergence of the Rus' Khaganate. The Volga River was used mainly by traders from the Oriental and Viking world.

== Population ==
The region is home to a large portion of Russia's population, with the major cities of Yaroslavl, Kostroma, Nizhny Novgorod, Cheboksary, Kazan, Ulyanovsk, Tolyatti, Samara, Saratov, Volgograd and Astrakhan all located directly on the Volga River. Other major cities on tributaries of the Volga include Ryazan, Dzerzhinsk, Kaluga and Oryol on the Oka River, Penza on the Sura River, Perm and Naberezhnye Chelny on the Kama River, Yoshkar-Ola on the Malaya Kokshaga River, and Dimitrovgrad on the Bolshoy Cheremshan River.

Major cities located on tributaries of the Volga's tributaries include Moscow, the largest city and capital of Russia, on the Moskva River, a tributary of the Oka River. Kirov is located on the Vyatka River, and Ufa, Sterlitamak and Salavat are located on the Belaya River, both tributaries of the Kama River.

== See also ==
- Povolzhye famine
- Samara Bend
- Volga Germans
