= Kundysh River =

Kundysh River may refer to several places:

- Bolshoy Kundysh River, a river in Kirov Oblast and Mari El, Russia
- Maly Kundysh River, a river in Mari El, Russia
