= Cheboksary (disambiguation) =

Cheboksary is the capital city of the Chuvash Republic, Russia.

Cheboksary may also refer to:

- Cheboksary Urban Okrug, a municipal formation which the city of republic significance of Cheboksary in the Chuvash Republic, Russia is incorporated as
- Cheboksary Airport, an airport in the Chuvash Republic, Russia
- Cheboksary Dam, a hydroelectric dam on the Volga River, Russia
- Cheboksary Reservoir, an artificial lake formed by the Cheboksary Dam in Russia
- Cheboksary, Tambov Oblast, a rural locality (a village) in Nikiforovsky District of Tambov Oblast, Russia
- Cheboksary railway station, a railway station in the city of Cheboksary, on the Gorky Railway
