= Kokshaga =

Kokshaga may refer to:

- Bolshaya Kokshaga River
- Malaya Kokshaga River
