= Yevgeny Maslov =

Yevgeni or Yevgeny Maslov may refer to:

- Yevgeni Maslov (born 1966), Russian footballer
- Yevgeny Maslov (politician) (born 1979), Russian politician and mayor of Yoshkar-Ola
