= Bolshaya Kokshaga =

Kugu Kakšan, Bolshaya Kokshaga
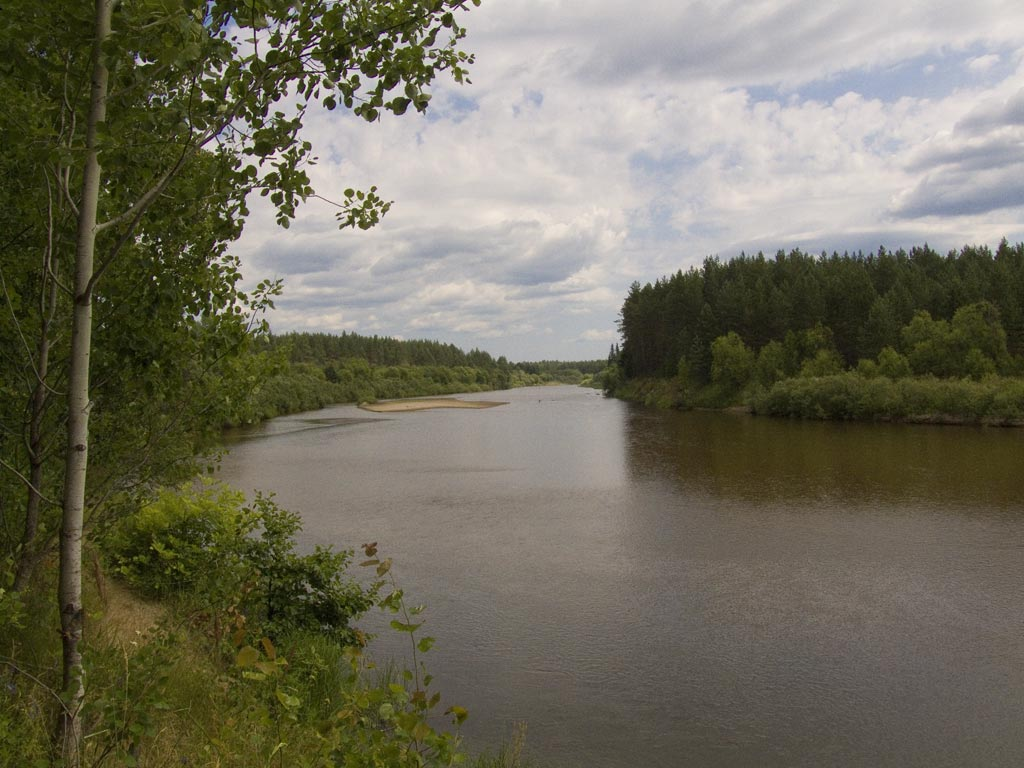

Location
- Country: Kirov Oblast and Mari El, Russia

Physical characteristics
- Source
  - location: Kirov Oblast
- Mouth: Volga
  - location: Kuybyshev Reservoir, near Kokshaysk, Mari El
  - coordinates: 56°08′35″N 47°47′29″E
- Length: 297 km (185 mi)
- Basin size: 6,330 km^{2} (2,440 sq mi)

Basin features
- Progression: Volga→ Caspian Sea

The Bolshaya Kokshaga (Mari: Кугу Какшан, Kugu Kakšan; Russian: Больша́я Кокша́га, literally Great Kokshaga) is a river in Kirov Oblast and Mari El, Russian Federation. It is a left-bank tributary of the Volga. Its length is 297 km and its drainage basin is 6,330 km². The river is fed by snow and rain, and from November till April it is usually frozen.

The river originates in the coniferous forests of Kirov Oblast where the area is thinly populated by the Russians and Mari people. The main settlements on Kokshaga are Kiknur and Sanchursk in Kirov Oblast. The Mari El river passes through the Mari Depression, where mixed forests and swamps are situated. This area is also thinly populated and the Bolshaya Kokshaga nature reserve is located there. The Bolshaya Kokshaga flows to the Kuybyshev Reservoir, and then to the Volga near Kokshaysk, Mari El.

The main tributary of the Bolshaya Kokshaga is the Bolshoy Kundysh.

== Rafting ==
Rafting is popular on the Bolshaya Kokshaga in the spring time, from April–May. In summer the river become shallow and the riverbed becomes blocked with logs floating downstreams.

== See also ==
- Malaya Kokshaga
