= Bolshoy Kundysh =

Bolshoy Kundysh, Kugu Kundyš
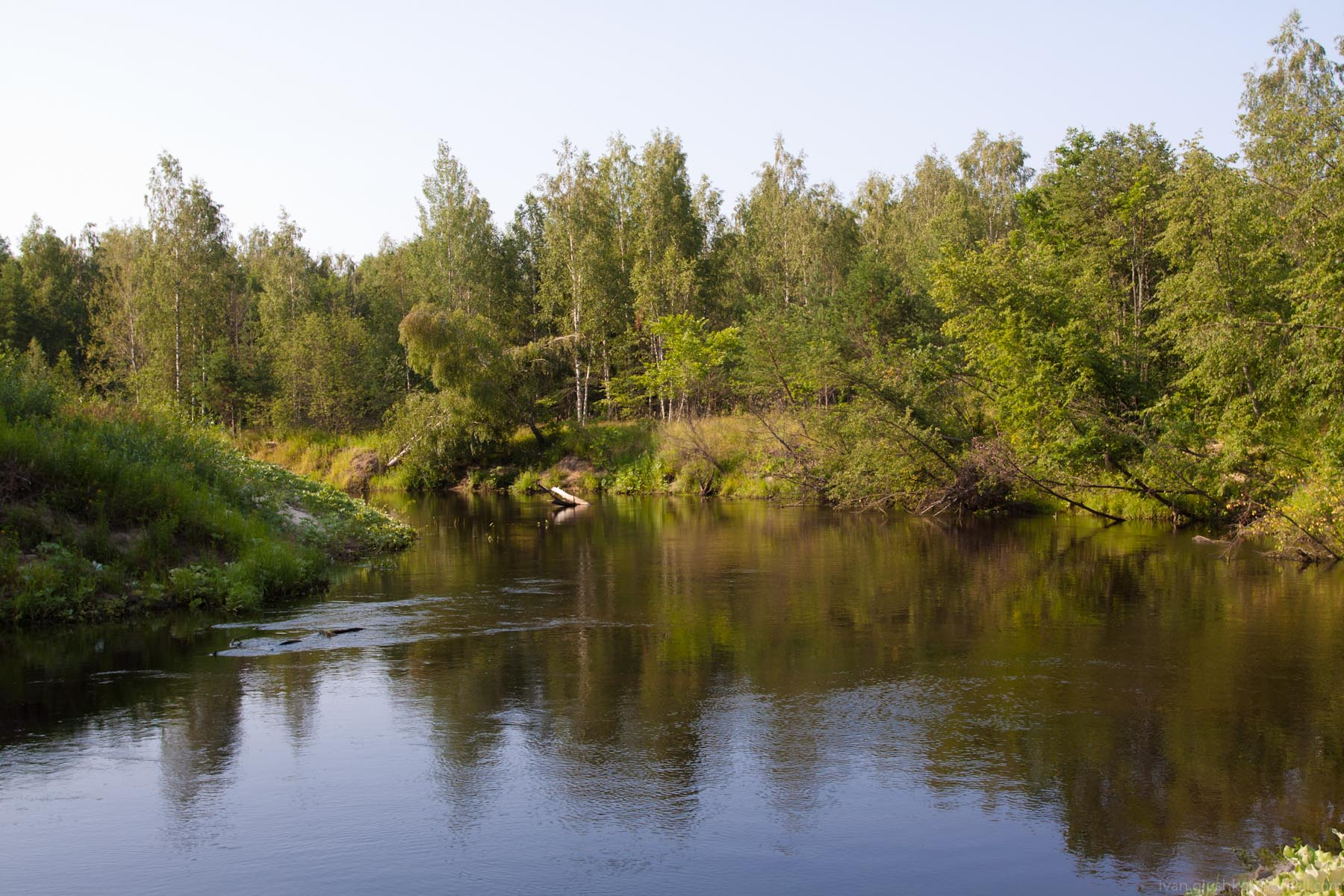

Location
- Country: Mari El, Russia

Physical characteristics
- Mouth: Bolshaya Kokshaga
  - coordinates: 56°29′21″N 47°23′49″E
- Length: 173 km (107 mi)
- Basin size: 1,710 km^{2} (660 sq mi)

Basin features
- Progression: Bolshaya Kokshaga→ Volga→ Caspian Sea

Bolshoy Kundysh (Mari: Кугу Кундыш, Kugu Kundyš, Russian: Большо́й Ку́ндыш, literally Great Kundysh) is a river in Kirov Oblast and Mari El, Russia, a right tributary of the Bolshaya Kokshaga. It is 173 km long, its drainage basin is 1710 km^{2}. Bolshoy Kundysh flows across the fen of the Mari Depression. Kilemary settlement is placed on Bolshoy Kundysh. The river is feed mostly by snow.
