= Sanchursky District =

Sanchursky District Санчурский район (Russian)
- District
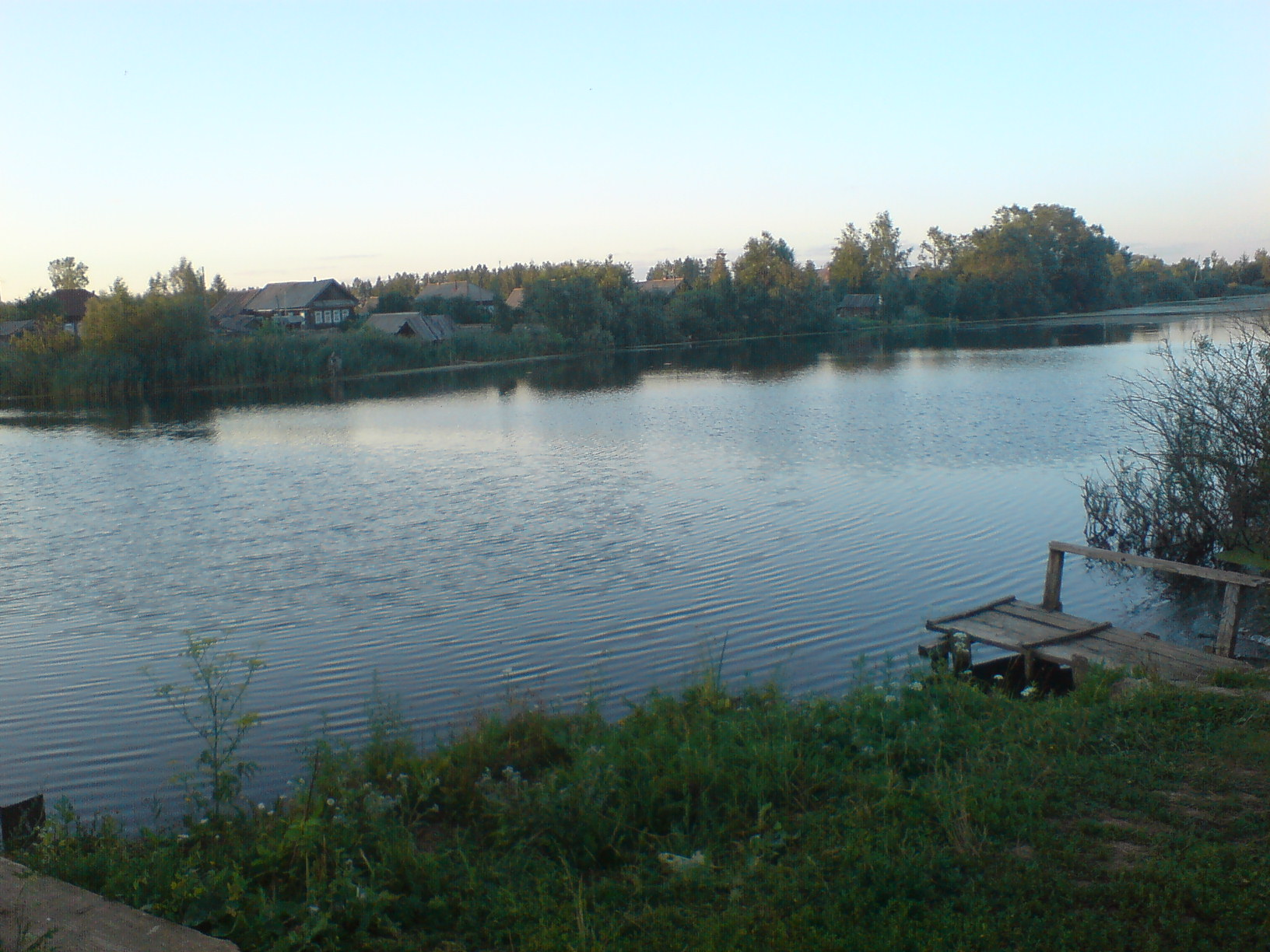
- Morozikha River in Votchina, Sanchursky District

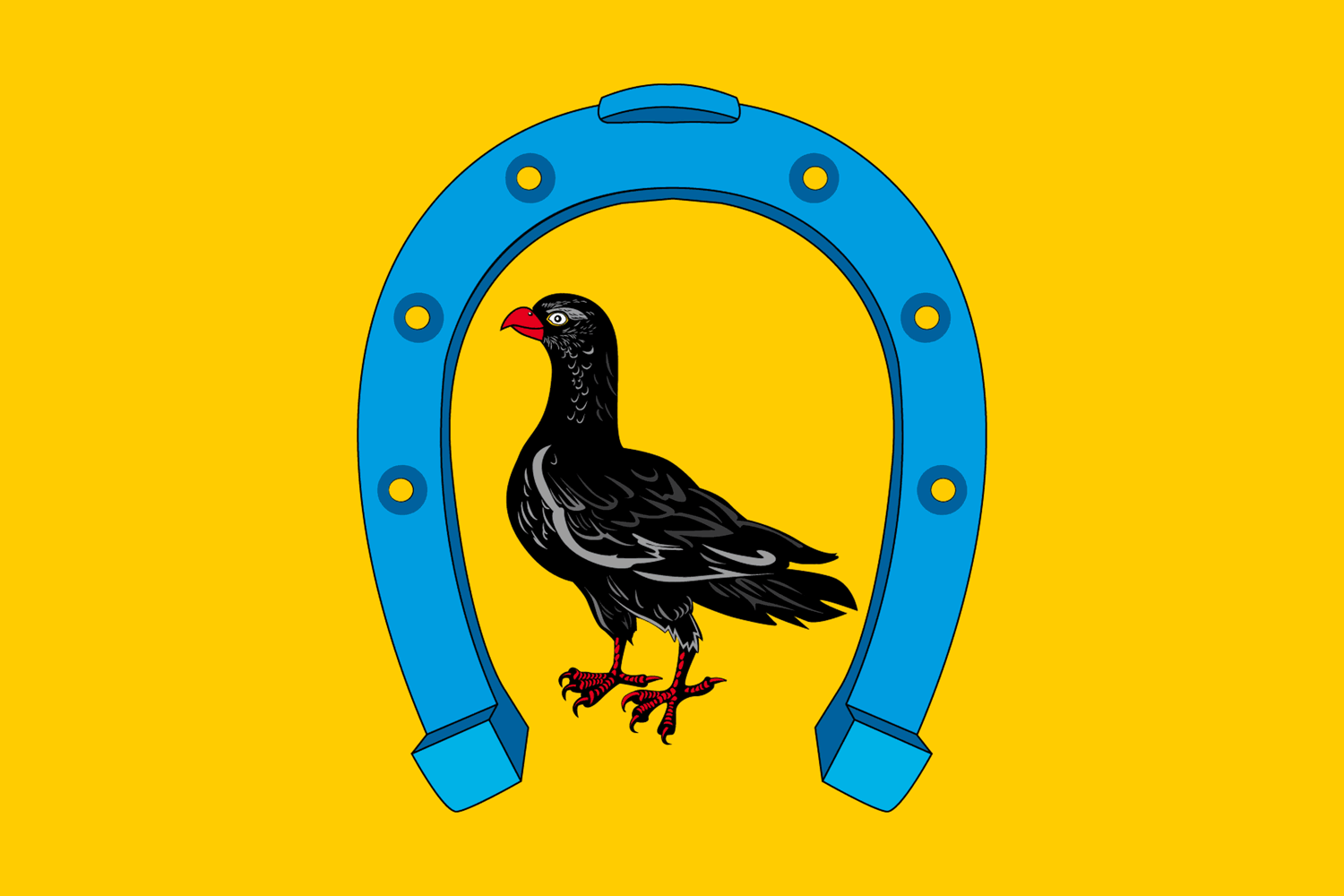
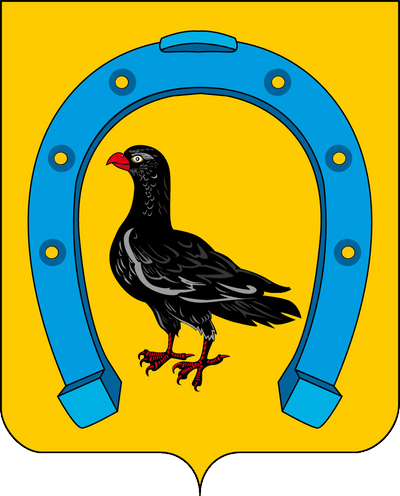
- Flag Coat of arms
- Location of Sanchursky District in Kirov Oblast
- Coordinates: 56°57′N 47°16′E
- Country: Russia
- Federal subject: Kirov Oblast
- Established: 15 July 1929
- Administrative center: Sanchursk

Area
  - Total: 1,536 km^{2} (593 sq mi)

Population (2010 Census)
  - Total: 10,080
  - Density: 6.562/km^{2} (17.00/sq mi)
  - Urban: 46.9%
  - Rural: 53.1%

Administrative structure
  - Administrative divisions: 1 Urban-type settlements, 6 Rural okrugs
  - Inhabited localities: 1 urban-type settlements, 159 rural localities

Municipal structure
  - Municipally incorporated as: Sanchursky Municipal District
  - Municipal divisions: 1 urban settlements, 6 rural settlements
- Time zone: UTC+3 (MSK)
- OKTMO ID: 33533000
- Website: http://admsanch.ru/

Sanchursky District (Russian: Са́нчурский райо́н) is an administrative and municipal district (raion), one of the thirty-nine in Kirov Oblast, Russia. It is located in the southwest of the oblast. The area of the district is 1,536 square kilometers (593 sq mi). Its administrative center is the urban locality (an urban-type settlement) of Sanchursk. Population: 10,080 (2010 census); 14,063 (2002 Census); 17,719 (1989 Soviet census). The population of Sanchursk accounts for 46.9% of the district's total population.

== People ==
- Konstantin Vershinin (1900-1973)
