= Yevgeny Maslov (politician) =

Russian politician and mayor of Yoshkar-Ola

- Евгений Маслов
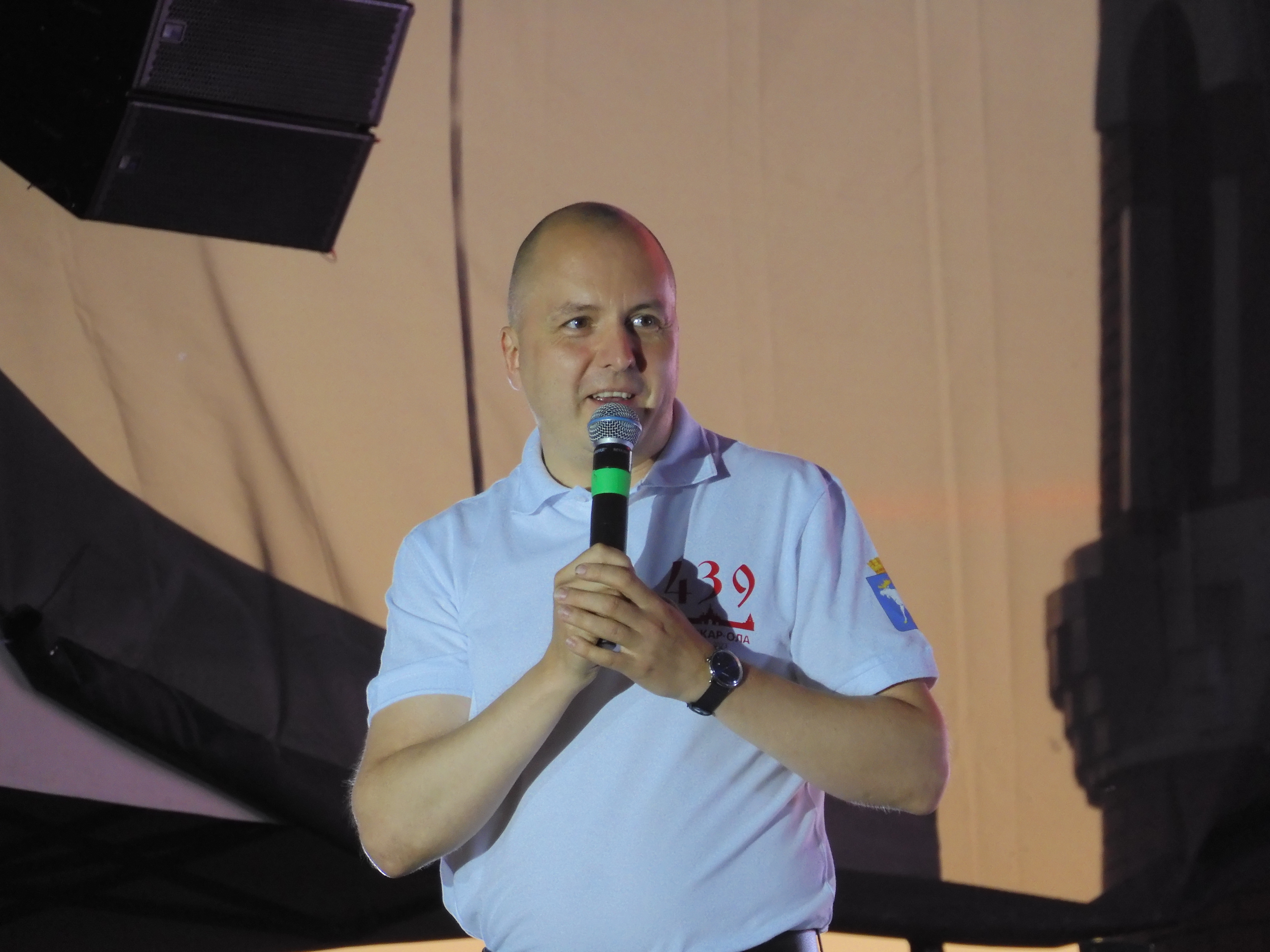

5th Mayor of Yoshkar-Ola
- Incumbent
- Assumed office 28 December 2015
- Preceded by: Pavel Plotnikov
- In office 25 November 2015 – 28 December 2015 acting

Acting Mayor of Volzhsk
- In office 2 July 2015 – 25 November 2015
- Preceded by: Nikolai Senchenko

Personal details
- Born: Yevgeny Vasilyevich Maslov; 22 September 1979 (age 47) Kusye-Alexandrovsky, Russian SFSR, Soviet Union
- Party: United Russia
- Education: Mari State University
- Profession: Lawyer
- Website: i-ola.ru (official)

Yevgeny Vasilyevich Maslov (Russian: Евгений Васильевич Маслов; born 22 September 1977) is a Russian politician, serving as head of the Yoshkar-Ola Urban Okrug and Yoshkar-Ola city since 28 December 2015, who was also previously acting mayor of Volzhsk.

== Biography ==
Born on 22 September 1979, he graduated from the Faculty of Law of Mari State University. He worked in the registration chamber under the Ministry of the Justice of Mari El Republic, prosecutor's office, and was a judge of the Arbitration Court of Mari El. He headed the department for control of natural resources and protection of environment of the Tver Oblast, and public service Rosreestr for the Republic of Mari El.

== Political career ==
In July 2015 Maslov was appointed acting mayor of Volzhsk.

From 25 November 2015 Maslov was acting head of Yoshkar-Ola Urban Okrug administration — mayor of Yoshkar-Ola.

Since 28 December 2015 Maslov has been serving as head of the Yoshkar-Ola Urban Okrug administration and mayor of Yoshkar-Ola city.
