= Kokshaysk =

Village in Zvenigovsky District, Russia

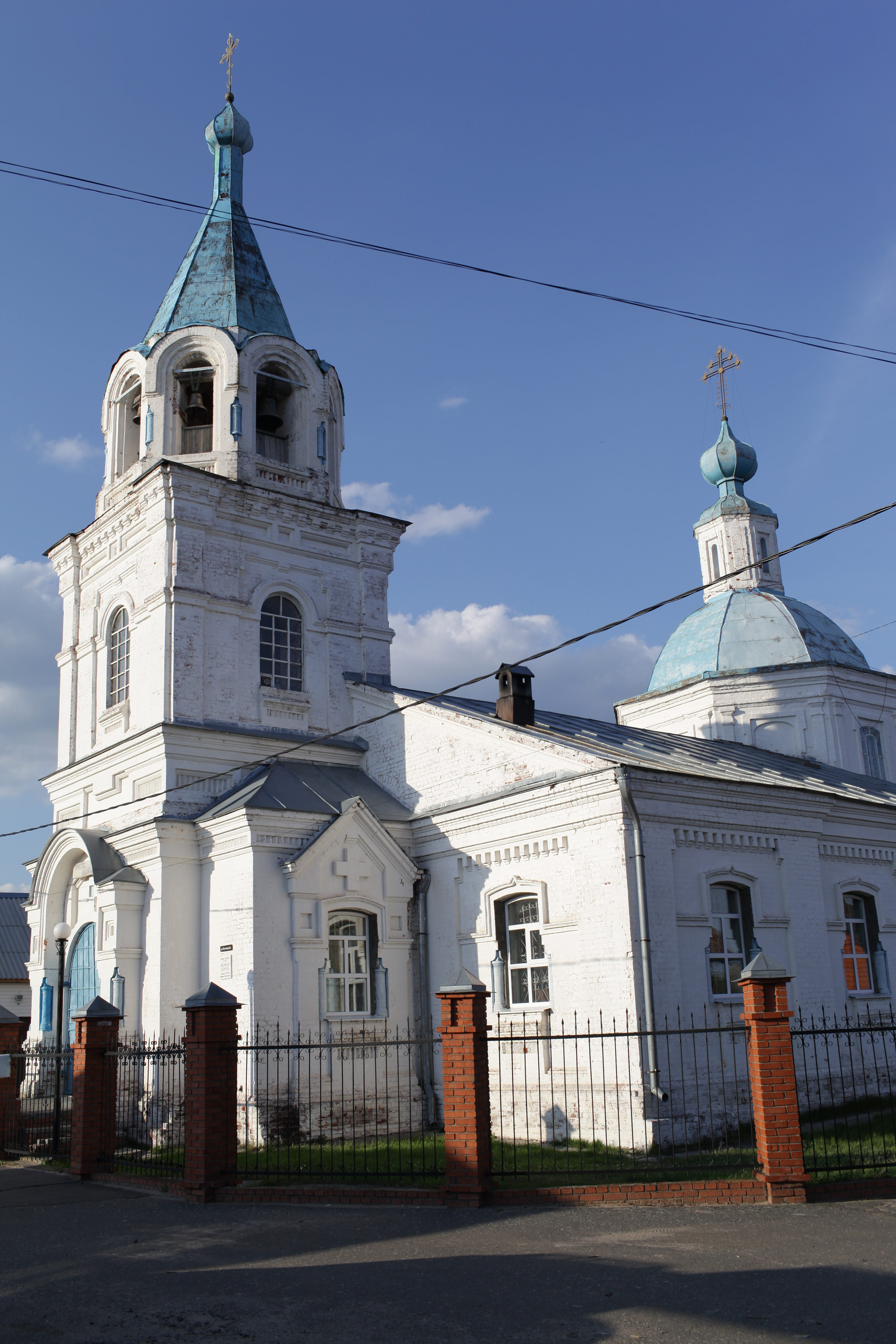
Orthodox church of the Protection of the Holy Virgin (1793) in Koksaysk

Kokshaysk (Russian: Кокша́йск; Mari: Какшанла, Kakšanla; Meadow Mari: Какшан, romanized: Kakšan) is a village (selo) in Zvenigovsky District, Mari El Republic, Russia. It is administratively subordinated to the city of Yoshkar-Ola, as the river port of Yoshkar-Ola is located there. Kokshaysk is situated near the Mari village of Kokshamary, on the left bank of the Bolshaya Kokshaga River, where it flows into the Volga. A road connects the village with Yoshkar-Ola (56 km) and Novocheboksarsk (34 km). In 2003, the population of Kokshaysk was 1,340, mostly ethnic Russians, Mari, Chuvash, Tatars.

== History ==
On 11 April 1574, Kokshaysk was founded as a fortress on the lands of the Mari people, to suppress them in the course of the Cheremis (Mari) Wars. When Tsaryovokokshaysk (modern Yoshkar-Ola) was founded in the Mari mainland, Kokshaysk lost its importance. For 190 years it was the center of Kokshaysky Uyezd, covering both Mari and Chuvash sides of the Volga. In 1685 and 1727, Kokshaysk was damaged by the great fires. There were only seventy homesteads in Kokshaysk in 1724, and in 1765 it degraded to a village status; the uyezd was also abolished. Territorially, it belonged to Tsaryovokokshaysky Uyezd of Kazan Governorate. In 1774, Yemelyan Pugachev, defeated in the battle of Kazan, crossed the Volga there. In 1920, Kokshaysk was incorporated into Chuvash Autonomous Oblast, but in 1925 it was transferred to Mari Autonomous Oblast. In 1977, the port of Yoshkar-Ola was built there and Kokshaysk was directly subordinated to the Mari capital.
