= Bolshaya Kokshaga (nature reserve) =

Nature reserve in Mari-El, Russia

- Большая Кокшага
- IUCN category Ia (strict nature reserve)
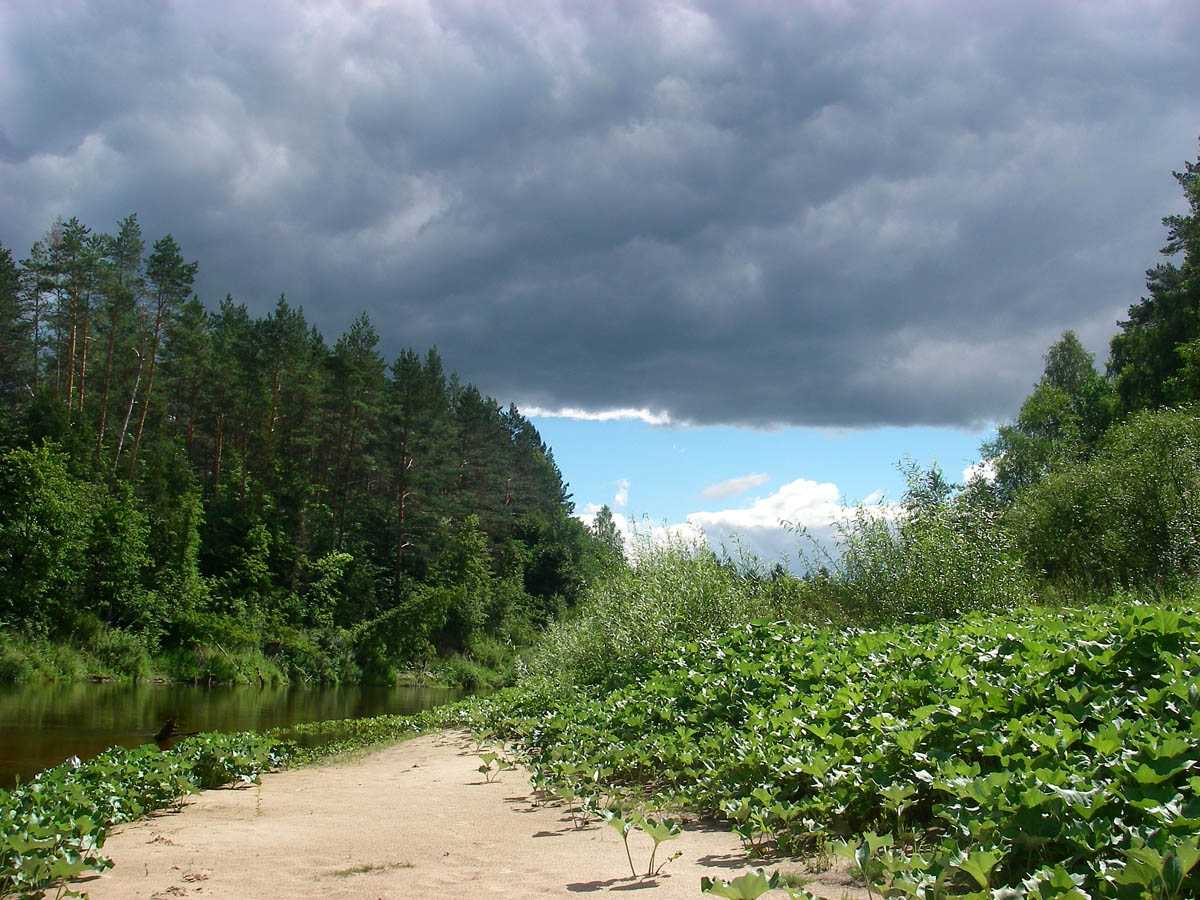

- Location within Russia
- Location: Mari-El, Russia
- Nearest city: Yoshkar-Ola
- Coordinates: 56°41′N 47°18′E
- Area: 21 405 ha
- Established: March 14, 1993
- Governing body: Федеральное государственное бюджетное учреждение "Государственный природный заповедник «Большая Кокшага»"
- Website: b-kokshaga.ru

Bolshaya Kokshaga Nature Reserve (Russian: Госуда́рственный приро́дный запове́дник Больша́я Кокша́га) is a nature reserve in Kilemarsky District and Medvedevsky District, Mari-El, Russia.
