= Cheboksary Reservoir =

- Шупашкар шыв усравĕ (Chuvash); Чебоксарское водохранилище (Russian)
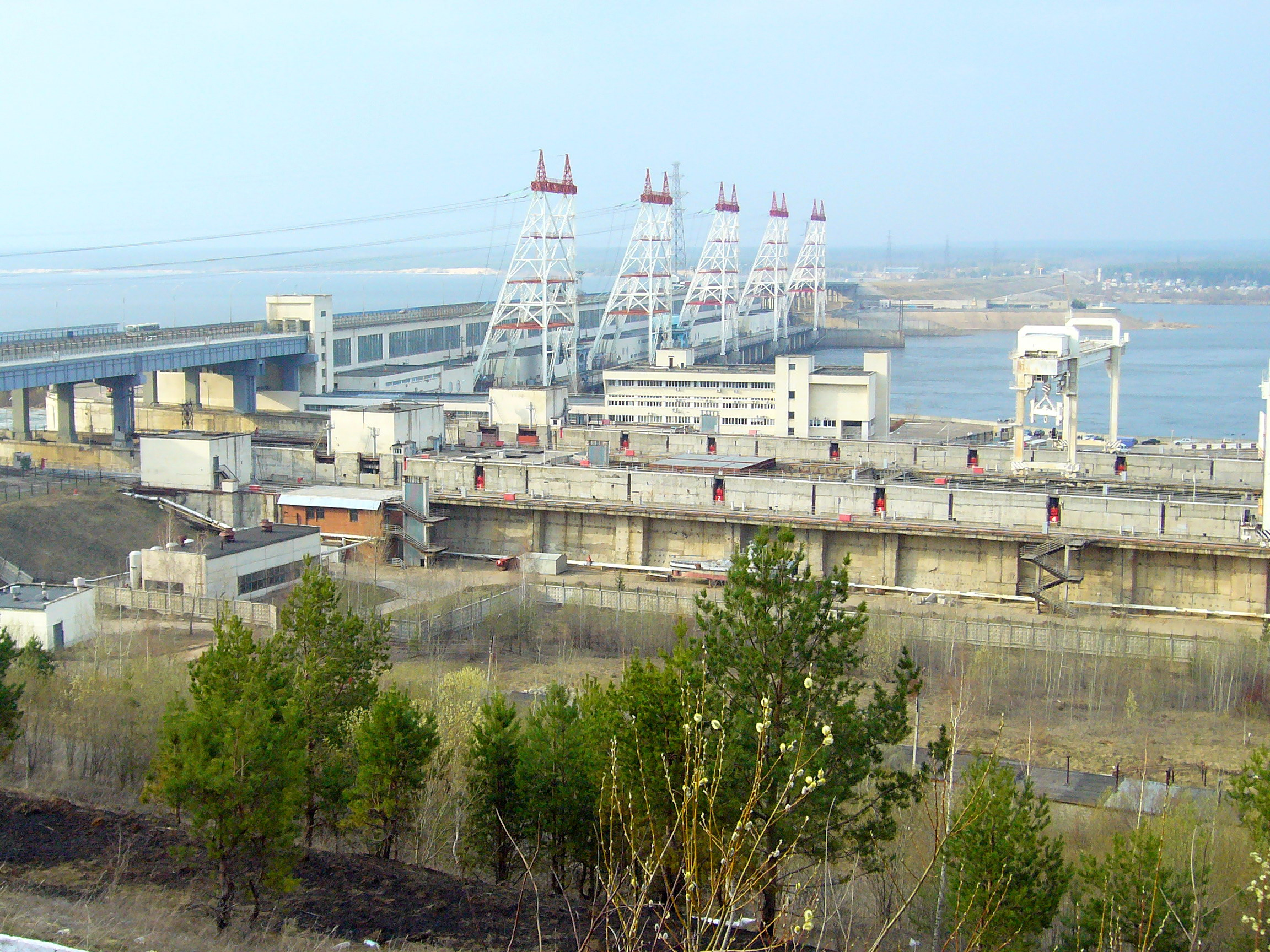

- Location within Russia
- Location: Russia
- Coordinates: 56°18′00″N 46°42′53″E
- Type: artificial lake
- Max. width: 16 kilometres (9.9 mi)
- Surface area: 2,190 square kilometres (850 sq mi)
- Average depth: 35 metres (115 ft)
- Max. depth: 35 metres (115 ft)

Cheboksary Reservoir (Note: Russian: Чебоксарское водохранилище, romanized: Čeboksarskoje vodohranilišče; Chuvash: Шупашкар шыв усравĕ, romanized: Şupaşkar şıv usravĕ) is an artificial lake in the central part of the Volga River formed by the Cheboksary Dam in Novocheboksarsk.

The surface area of Cheboksary Reservoir is 2,190 square kilometres (850 sq mi), max width is 16 kilometres (9.9 mi), max depth is 35 metres (115 ft). The reservoir has partly flooded the Mari Depression.

The largest cities on the Reservoir are Nizhny Novgorod, Cheboksary and Kozmodemyansk.
