= Mari State University =

University in Yoshkar-Ola, Russia

- Марийский государственный университет (Russian)
- Type: Public research
- Established: 1949
- Rector: Mikhail Shvetsov
- Students: 8,000
- Location: Lenin Square 1, Yoshkar Ola, Russia; 56.6315°N 47.8892°E Building details
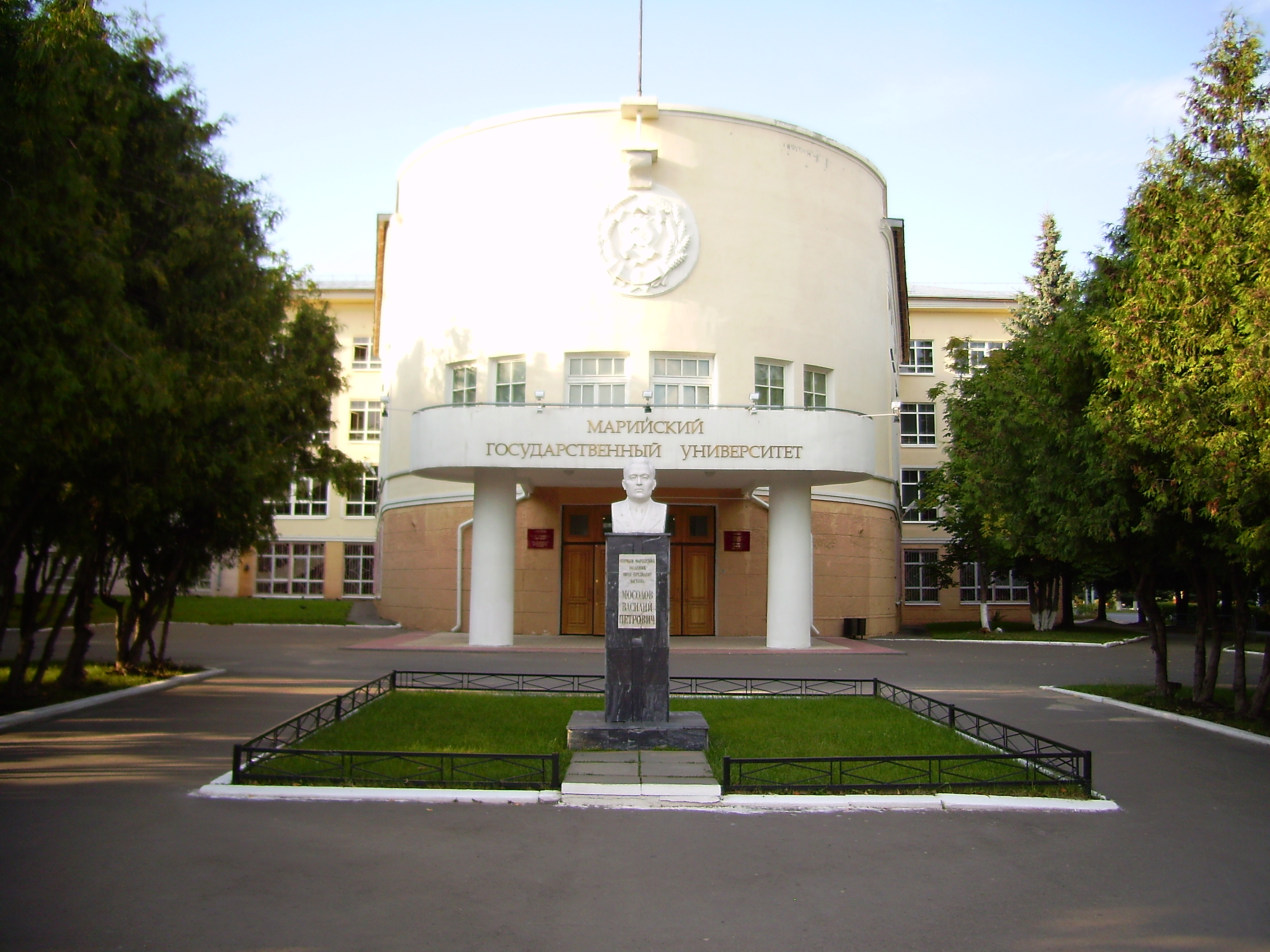
- Campus: Urban
- Website: marsu.ru

Mari State University was founded in 1972 in Yoshkar-Ola, Mari El Republic. Mari State University consists of 6 faculties and 6 institutes that train well-educated specialists for most sectors of the Russian national economy. Mari State University is one of the five founder members of the International Association of Finno-Ugric universities, one of the forty-one members of Russia's Association of Classical Universities. Classes are taken in Russian medium and English medium.

== Institutions ==
- Institute of Agricultural Technologies
- Institute of Economics, Management and Finances
- The Institute of Medicine and Natural science
- Institute of National Culture and Intercultural Communication
- Institute of Additional Professional Education
- Institute of Pedagogics and Psychology

== Faculties ==
- Faculty of medical science
- Faculty of Physics and Mathematics
- Faculty of Foreign Languages
- Faculty of Law
- Faculty of History and Philology
- Faculty of Physical Education, Sport and Tourism
- Faculty of Electrical Engineering
