= Semyk =

Mari traditional holiday

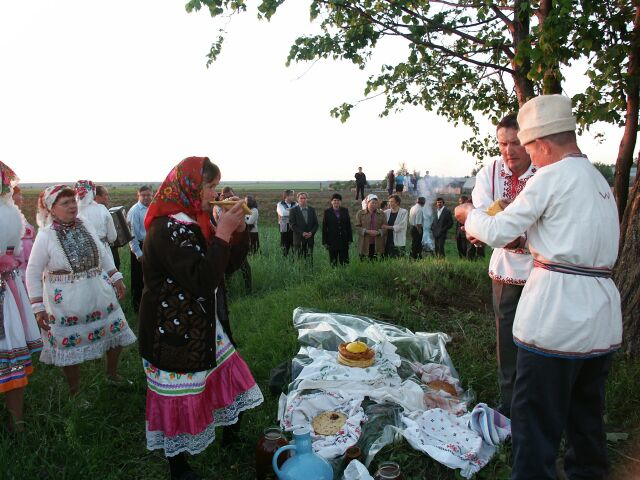
- Observed by: Mari people
- Date: June
- Frequency: Annual
- Related to: Semik

Semyk is a traditional holiday celebrated by the Mari people of the Volga region of Russia. It is celebrated in June, seven weeks after sorta keche, a commemoration of the deceased on the Thursday of Mari Easter week. Semyk involves veneration of ancestors, as well as weddings and feasts.

== Etymology ==
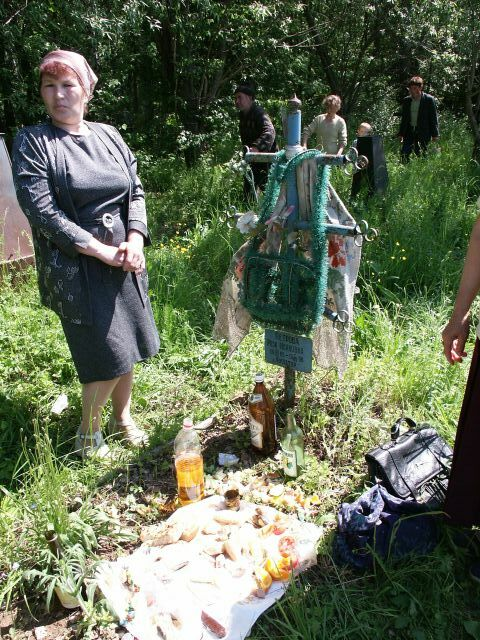
Commemorative meal at a grave

The name Semyk is derived from the Russian Semik, a Slavic Orthodox folk holiday celebrated before Trinity Sunday. Mari Semyk is celebrated at the same time as Slavic Semik. Other Mari names for Semyk include Kon arnia ("Lye week"), Kon keche ("Lye day"), and tiuvyt moncha ("main banya").

== Observances ==
Traditional celebration of Semyk follows a strict ritual progression. Preparations are done on Monday and Tuesday of Semyk week, where homes are thoroughly cleaned. Dog rose, juniper, birch, and mountain ash branches are hung on doorways for protection against evil spirits. During Semyk, work is prohibited.

The celebrations begin with a banya. The first banya is generally done on Wednesday, and ancestors are invited by name to participate in the ritual bathing, and symbolically steamed. The ancestors are then invited to tea.

A ritual meal is typically held on Wednesday, usually featuring pirogi, cheese tarts, blini, cheesecakes, and meat soups. Pagan and Christian rituals are syncretized; candles are lit, the food is blessed, and prayers are recited by the kart (priest), asking ancestors for assistance.

== See also ==
- Mari religion
