= Mari Depression =

Mari Depression Марийская низменность
- Depression
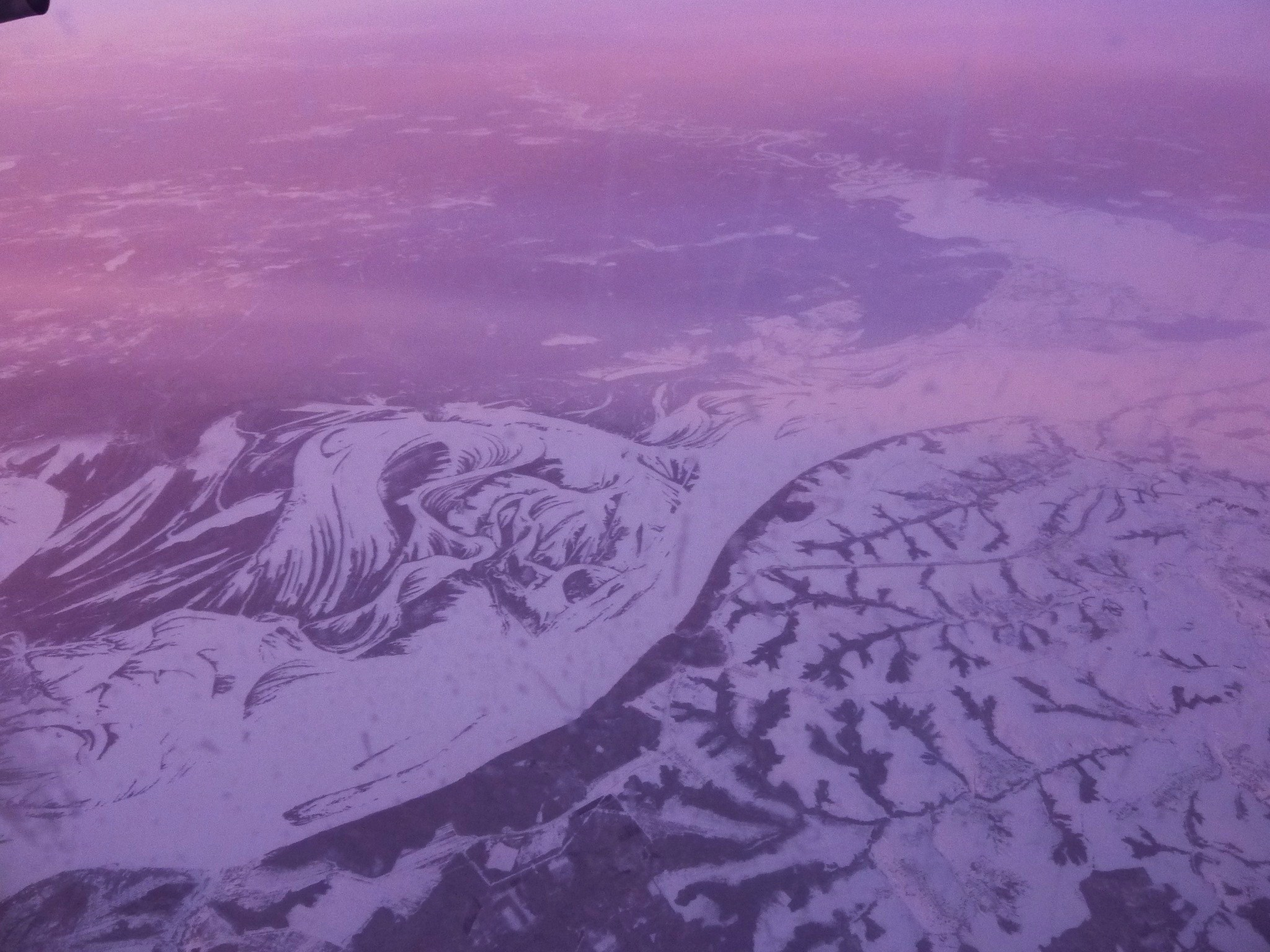
- Aerial view of the area

- Location in Mari El, Russia
- Coordinates: 56°30′N 46°35′E
- Location: Mari El, Russia
- Part of: Volga Basin

Area
  - Total: 270,000 km^{2} (100,000 sq mi)
- Elevation: 50 meters (160 ft) to 100 meters (330 ft)

The Mari Depression (Russian: Марийская низменность) is a depression in Gornomariysky District, Mari El, Russian Federation.

== Geography ==
The depression is located on the left side of the Volga, from the western borders of the Mari El to the Bolshaya Kokshaga River. The average height of the depression is between 50 meters (160 ft) and 100 meters (330 ft) and there are many small lakes and swamps. The area is now partly flooded by the Cheboksary Reservoir, which dams the Volga.

== Dunes ==
There are ancient dunes covered with forests located between the rivers.
