= Maly Kundysh =

Izi Kundyš, Maly Kundysh

Location
- Country: Mari El, Russia

Physical characteristics
- Mouth: Malaya Kokshaga
  - coordinates: 56°21′36″N 47°54′04″E
- Length: 107 km (66 mi)
- Basin size: 1,310 km^{2} (510 sq mi)

Basin features
- Progression: Malaya Kokshaga→ Volga→ Caspian Sea

Maly Kundysh (Mari: Изи Кундыш, Izi Kundyš, Russian: Малый Ку́ндыш, literally Little Kundysh) is a river in Mari El, Russia, a left tributary of the Malaya Kokshaga. It is 107 km long, its drainage basin is 1310 km².
