= Sanchursk =

Sanchursk Санчурск
- Urban-type settlement
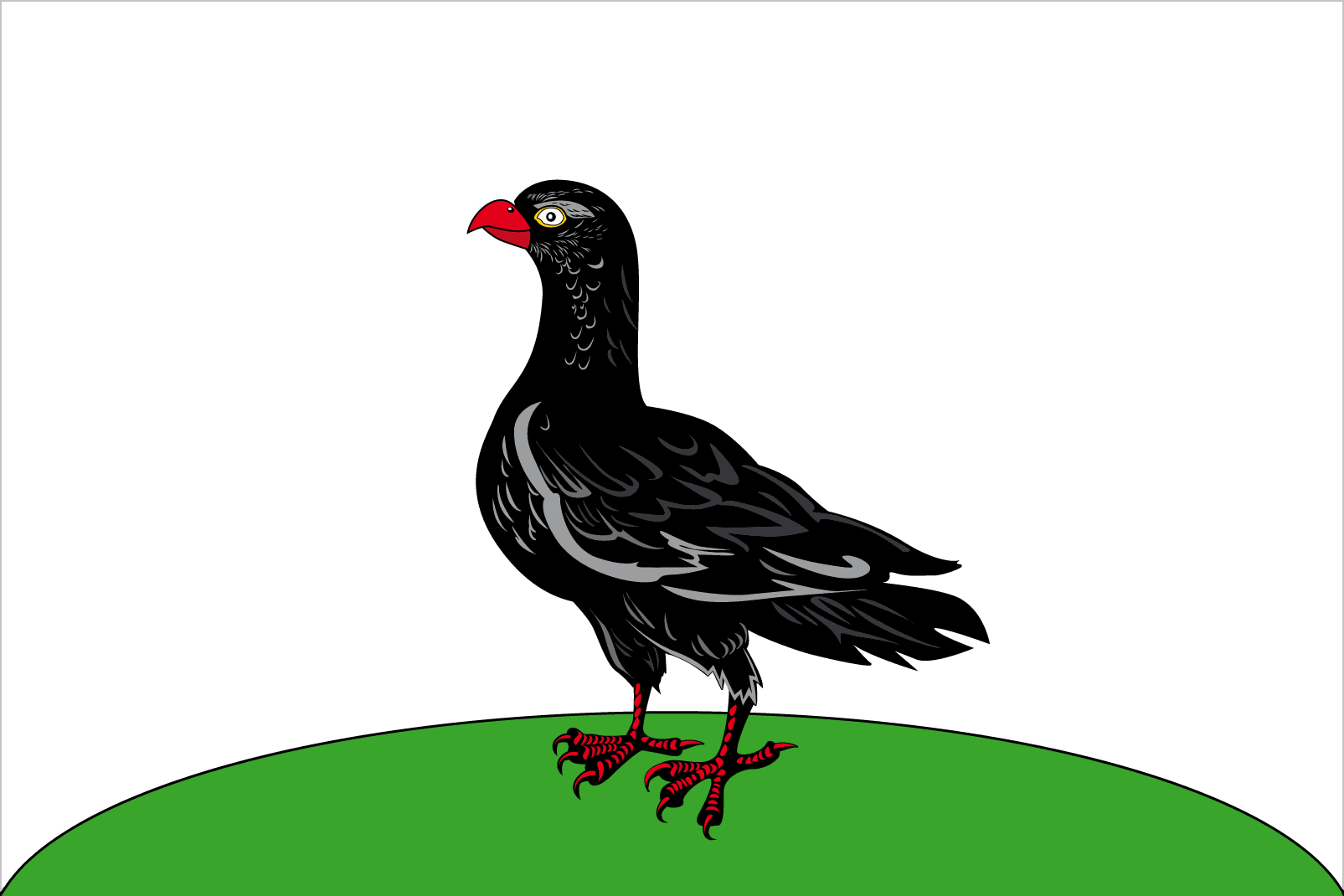
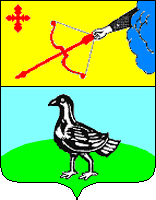
- Flag Coat of arms
- Interactive map of Sanchursk
- Location of Sanchursk Sanchursk (Kirov Oblast)
- Coordinates: 56.9404°N 47.2523°E
- Country: Russia
- Federal subject: Kirov Oblast
- Administrative district: Sanchursky District
- Founded: 1584

Population (2010 Census)
  - Total: 4,727
  - Estimate (2025): 3,729 (−21.1%)
- Time zone: UTC+3 (MSK)
- Postal code: 612370
- OKTMO ID: 33633151051

Sanchursk (Russian: Санчурск; Meadow Mari: Шынчара, Šynčara; Northwestern Mari: Шанцара, Šancara), is an urban locality (an urban-type settlement) in Sanchursky District of Kirov Oblast, Russia. Population: 4,727 (2010 census); 5,718 (2002 census); 6,490 (1989 Soviet census).
