= Cheboksary Dam =

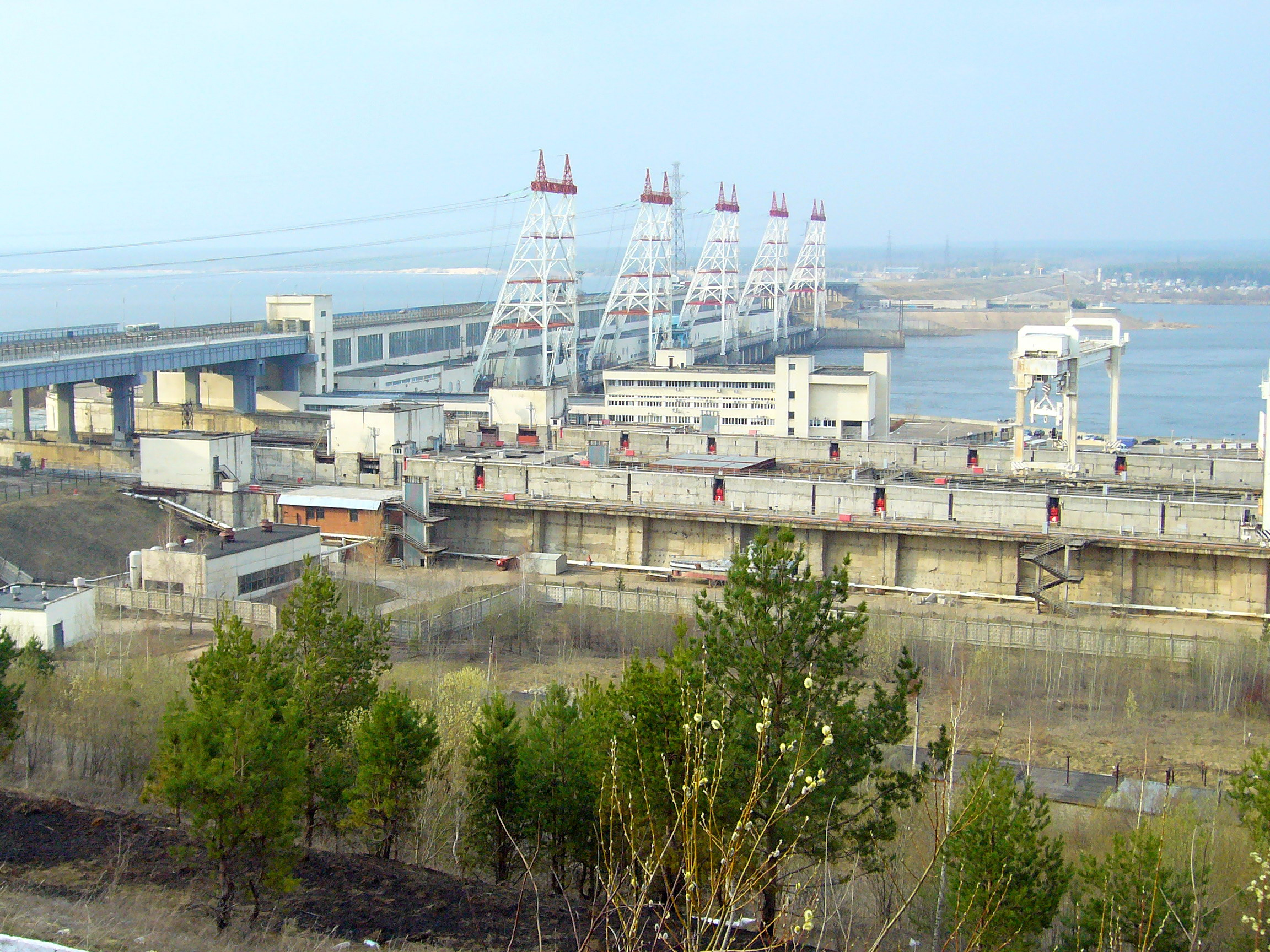

- Location within Russia
- Official name: Чебоксарская ГЭС
- Location: Cheboksary, Russia
- Coordinates: 56°08′17″N 47°27′56″E
- Construction began: 1968
- Opening date: 1986

Dam and spillways
- Impounds: Volga river

Reservoir
- Creates: Cheboksary Reservoir
- Surface area: 2,182 km^{2} (842 mi^{2})

Power Station
- Turbines: 18 × 78MW
- Installed capacity: 1,404 MW
- Annual generation: 2100 GWh

The Cheboksary Dam (Russian: Чебоксарская ГЭС, Chuvash: Шупашкар ГЭСӗ, Cheboksary GES) is a hydroelectric dam on the Volga river, the latest of the Volga-Kama Cascade of dams.

== Technical data ==
Construction started in the USSR in 1968 and mostly completed by 1986. The complex consists of a power plant built on dam 548 m long, concrete spillway dam 120 m long, earth fill dams with a total length of 3355 m, and a single-chamber two-lane lock. The total water front length is 4480 m. Installed power is 1404 MW, designed average annual production is 3310 GWh, but actual annual production is 2100 GWh due to lowered reservoir level. The power house has 18 generator units with Kaplan turbines, each 78 MW at 12.4 m head. The dam forms Cheboksary Reservoir with surface area of 2182 km^{2}.

== Reservoir level problem ==
The station began to work in 1981 with normal water level lowered to 63 m above sea level. Most of flooded land belonged to Mari El Republic. Flooded land included valuable meadows and several hundred acres ( hectares ) of oak forest that was not duly felled.

Rising normal water level to the design value of 68 m was hindered first by incomplete reservoir banks protection, then being opposed by Nizhny Novgorod Oblast and Mari El Republic. Now the station is operating at 63 m water level, with an actual installed power of 820 MW and an average annual production of 2100 GWh. Also lowered level poses difficulties to navigation on the Volga river between Nizhny Novgorod and Gorodets, with allowed draught down to 3 m, whereas it is 4 m on other parts of the Volga. Water quality in reservoir degrades because shallow waters comprise 33% of its area instead of the designed 19%. The water level problem is still being discussed.

Further water level rise will cause flood of vast areas of Nizhny Novgorod Oblast and Mari El, including most part of Nizhny Novgorod between the Oka and the Volga rivers.

== See also ==
- List of power stations in Russia
