= Malaya Kokshaga =

Izi Kakšan, Malaya Kokshaga
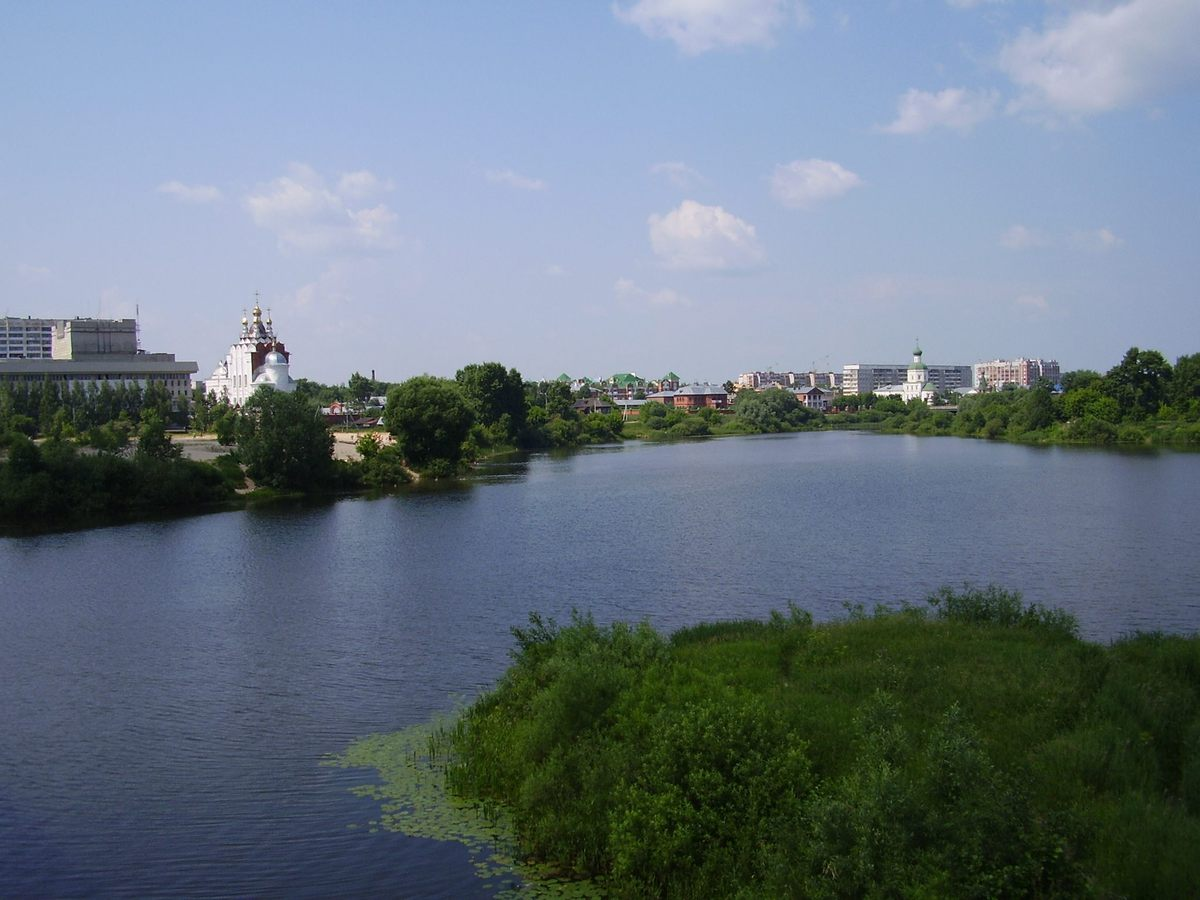
- Pond in the central part of Yoshkar-Ola

Location
- Country: Mari El, Russia

Physical characteristics
- Source
  - location: Mari El, Russia
- Mouth
  - location: Kuybyshev Reservoir, Volga near Kokshaysk, Mari El, Russia
  - coordinates: 56.1238°N 47.8905°E
- Length: 194 km (121 mi)
- Basin size: 5,160 km^{2} (1,990 sq mi)
- Discharge
  - average: 30 m^{3}/s (1,100 cu ft/s)

Basin features
- Progression: Volga→ Caspian Sea

The Malaya Kokshaga (Mari: Изи Какшан, Izi Kakšan; Russian: Малая Кокша́га, literally Little Kokshaga) is a river in Mari El, a left tributary of the Volga. It is 194 kilometres (121 mi) long, and has a drainage basin of 5,160 square kilometres (1,990 sq mi). It originates in the northern part of the republic, passes through its capital, Yoshkar-Ola, and flows to the Kuybyshev Reservoir, Volga near Kokshaysk. The Malaya Kokshaga is mainly fed by snow. From November till April, the river is frozen. The riverbed is meandering; there are many former river beds in the valley. The main tributary is the Maly Kundysh.

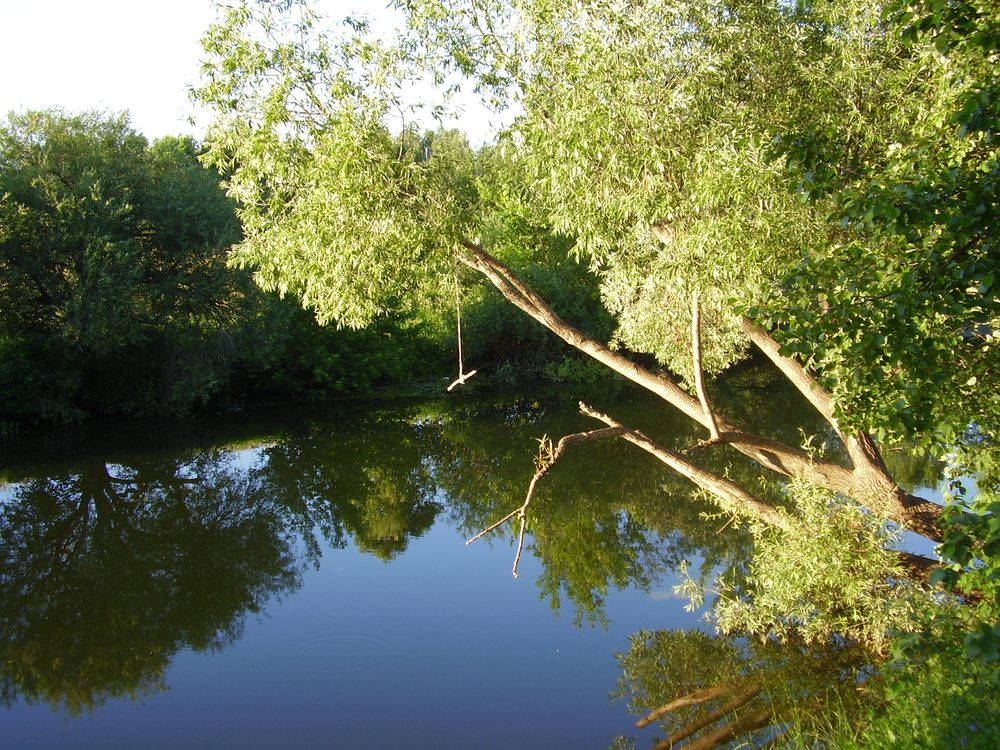
Malaya Kokshaga above Yoshkar Ola

== See also ==
- Bolshaya Kokshaga
