= Yoshkar-Ola =

Capital of Mari El, Russia

Yoshkar-Ola Йошкар-Ола Charla (Чарла)
- City

Other transcription(s)
  - Meadow Mari: Йошкар-Ола
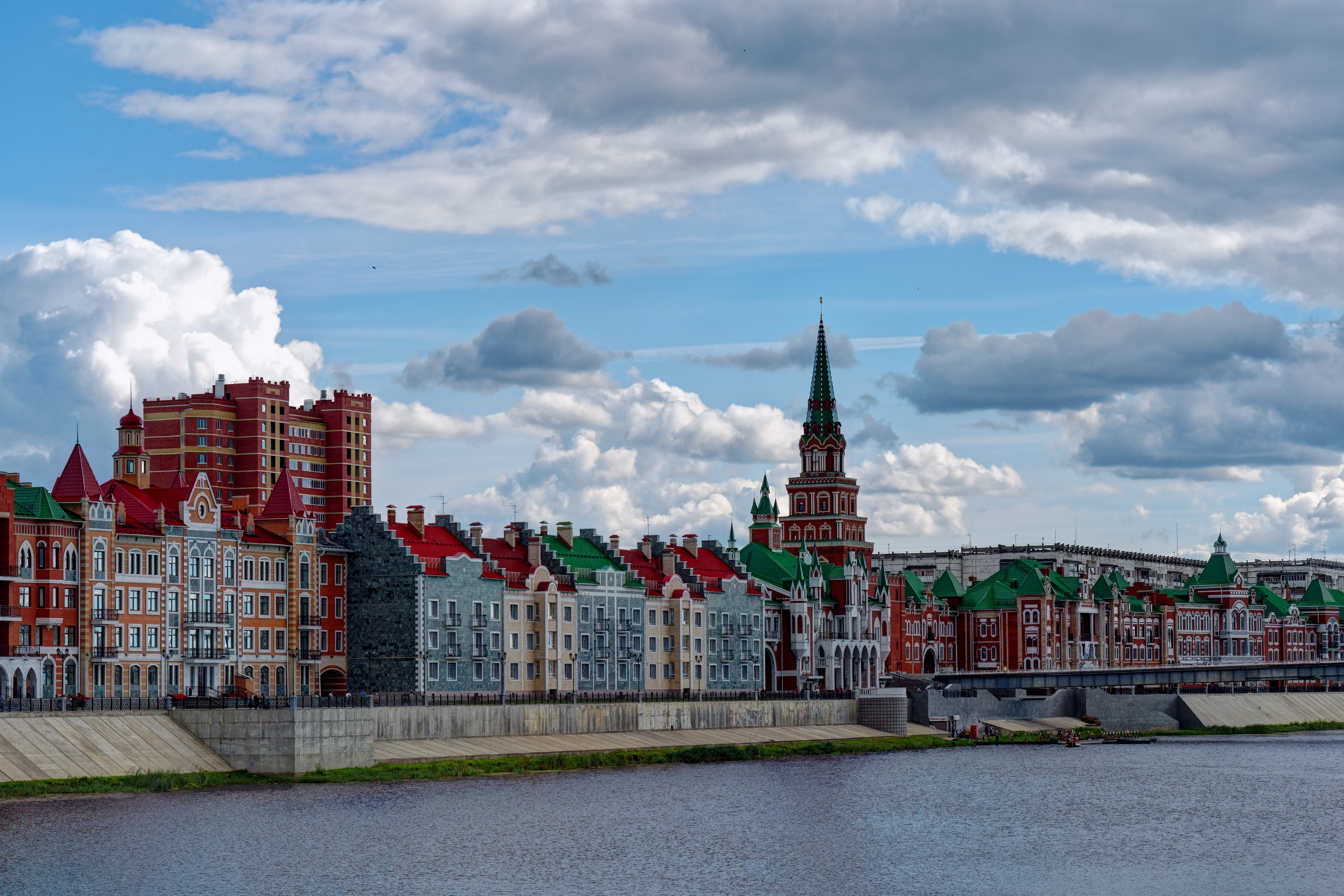
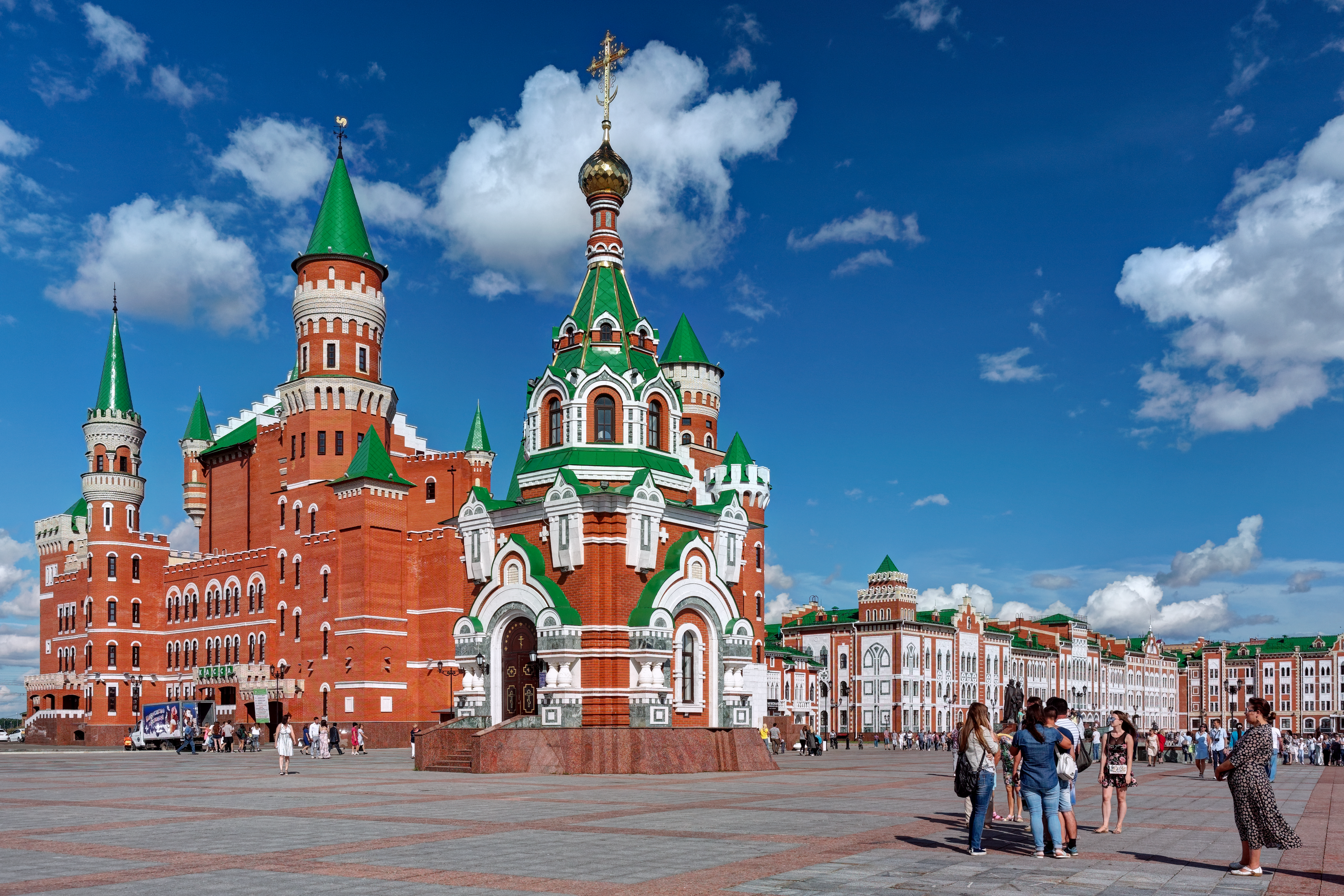
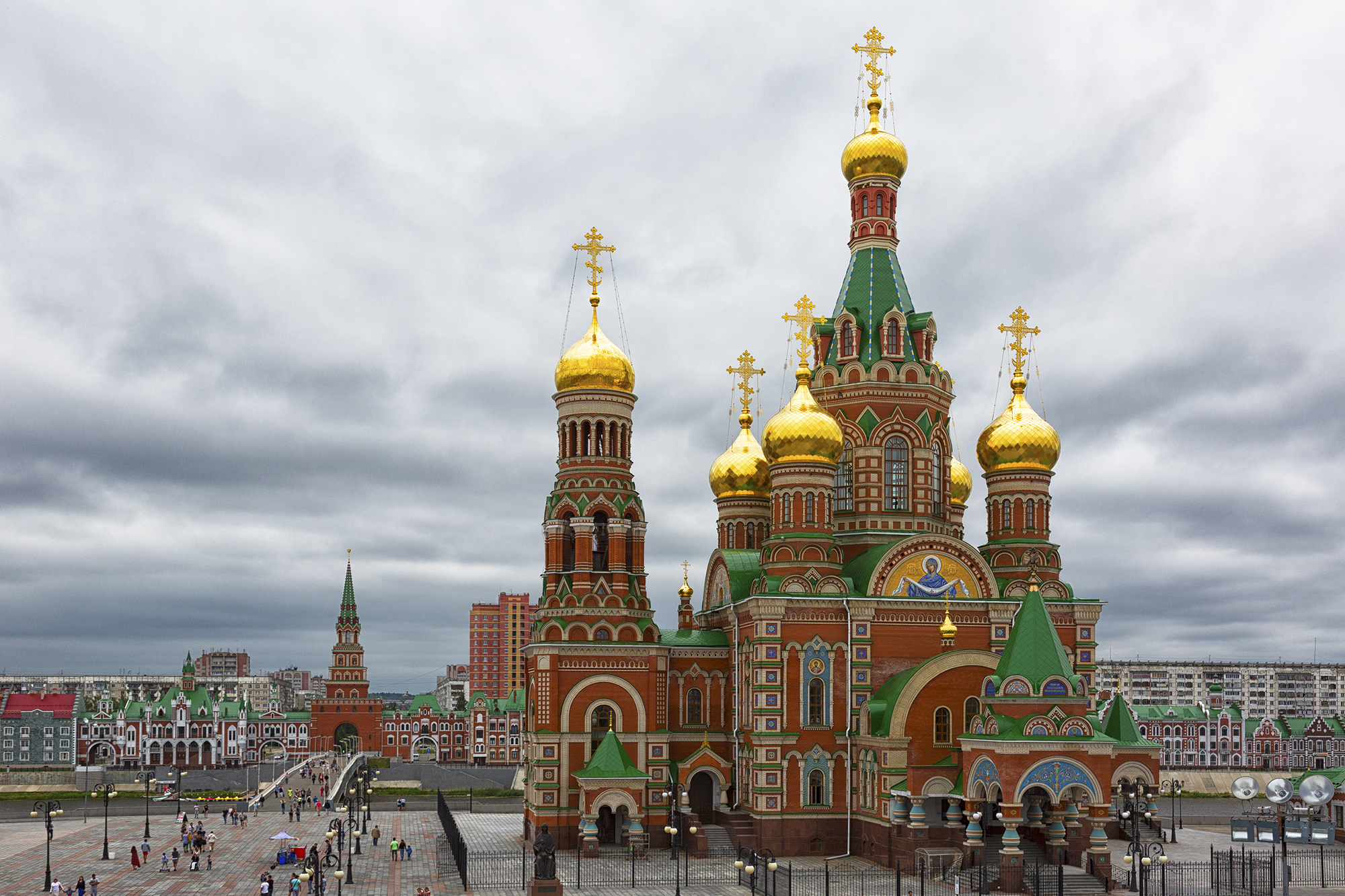
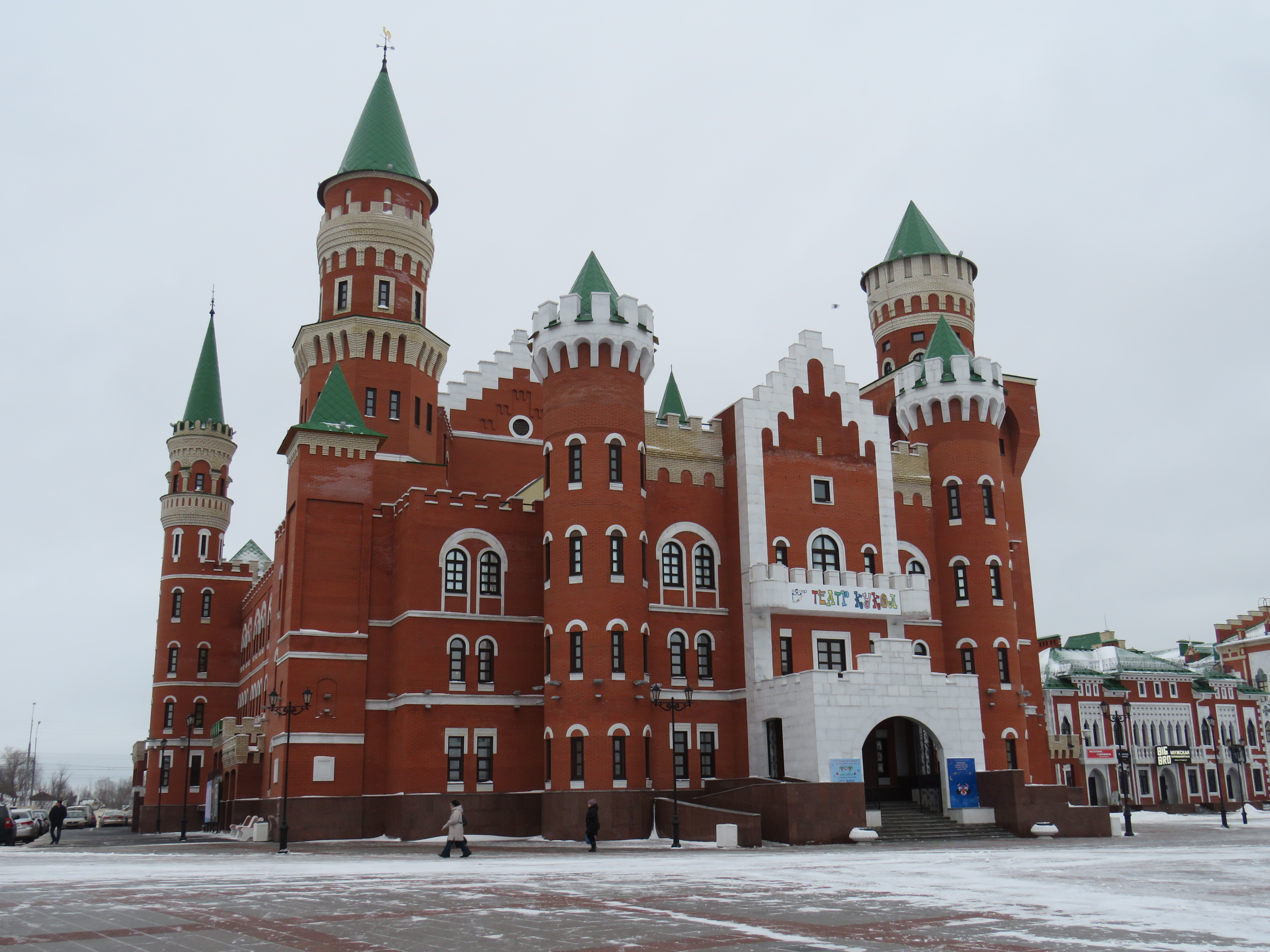
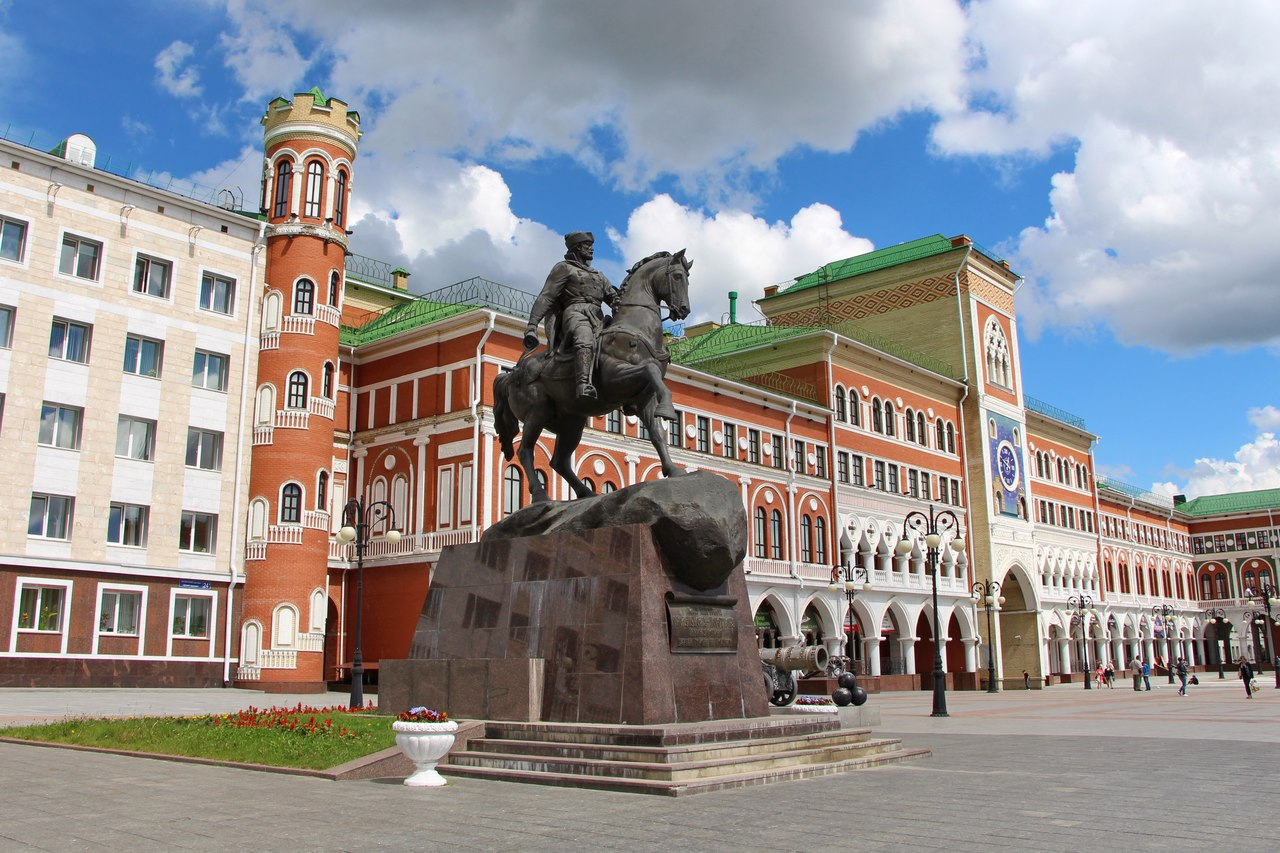
- From the top to bottom-right, The Brugge Embankment, Main Square, Annunciation Orthodox cathedral, Republican Puppet Theatre, Obolensky-Nogotkov Square

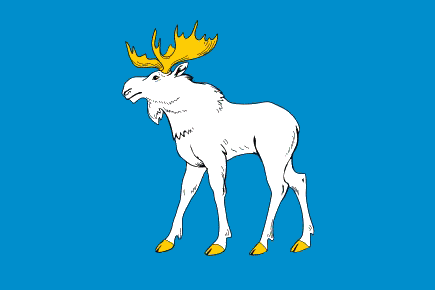
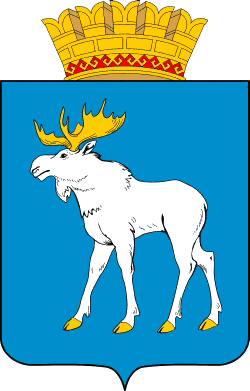
- Flag Coat of arms
- Anthem: Song About Yoshkar-Ola
- Interactive map of Yoshkar-Ola
- Location of Yoshkar-Ola Yoshkar-Ola (European Russia) Yoshkar-Ola (Europe)
- Coordinates: 56°39′N 47°53′E
- Country: Russia
- Federal subject: Mari El
- Founded: 1584
- City status since: 1781

Government
  - Body: City Assembly of Yoshkar-Ola
  - Head: Yevgeny Maslov
- Elevation: 100 m (330 ft)

Population (2010 Census)
  - Total: 248,782
  - Estimate (2025): 285,219 (+14.6%)
  - Rank: 74th in 2010

Administrative status
  - Subordinated to: city of republic significance of Yoshkar-Ola
  - Capital of: Mari El Republic
  - Capital of: city of republic significance of Yoshkar-Ola

Municipal status
  - Urban okrug: Yoshkar-Ola Urban Okrug
  - Capital of: Yoshkar-Ola Urban Okrug
- Time zone: UTC+3 (MSK)
- Postal codes: 424000–424008, 424010, 424016, 424019, 424020, 424026, 424028, 424030–424034, 424036–424040, 424045, 424700, 424899, 424950, 424999
- Dialing code: +7 8362
- OKTMO ID: 88701000001
- City Day: August 6
- Website: www.i-ola.ru

Yoshkar-Ola (Mari and Russian: Йошкар-Ола) is the capital city of Mari El, Russia. It was formerly known as Tsarevokokshaysk (Царевококшайск) from 1584 to 1919, and as Krasnokokshaysk (Краснококшайск) from 1919 to 1927. Population: 281,248 (2021 census); 248,782 (2010 census); 256,719 (2002 census); 241,601 (1989 Soviet census).

Yoshkar-Ola was established as a military fortress in 1584, following the Russian conquest of the Mari-inhabited regions of the Volga and its tributaries. It is one of the centers of the Mari people (especially of the Meadow Mari subgroup) and the administrative center of the Yoshkar-Ola city district.

== Etymology ==
Yoshkar-Ola means 'red town' in Mari, from yoshkar ('red') and ola ('town'). It received its current name in 1927. From 1584 to 1919, it was known as Tsarevokokshaysk in reference to the tsar and therefore could be literally translated as 'tsar's town on the (river) Kokshaga'. From 1919 to 1927, it was known as Krasnokokshaysk in reference to communism and therefore could be literally translated as 'red town on the (river) Kokshaga'. It is also known as Charla (Чарла) by the Mari people.

== History ==
Historical affiliations

Tsardom of Russia 1584–1721
Russian Empire 1721–1917
Russian Republic 1917-1918
Russian Democratic Federal Republic 1918
Russian Soviet Federative Socialist Republic 1918-1922
Union of Soviet Socialist Republics 1922–1991
Russian Federation 1991–present

Yoshkar-Ola was established as a military fortress in 1584, following the Russian conquest of the Mari region.

During the Soviet era, especially after World War II, the city was a regional industrial and transport center and grew to its current size.

The collapse of the Soviet Union removed support for state enterprises, and led to the shutdown of most manufacturing activity in the area. Much of the city's economic activity was supported by shuttle traders who would transport (often counterfeit) goods from the bustling markets of Moscow to Yoshkar-Ola's bazaars. The sharp decline in living standards led to the emigration of specialized professionals to larger cities in Russia.

== Geography ==
The Malaya Kokshaga River runs through the city.

=== Time zone ===
Yoshkar-Ola is located in the MSK time zone (Moscow time). The offset of the applicable time relative to UTC is +3:00 In accordance with the applicable time and longitude, the average solar noon in Yoshkar-Ola occurs at 11:48.

== Administrative and municipal status ==
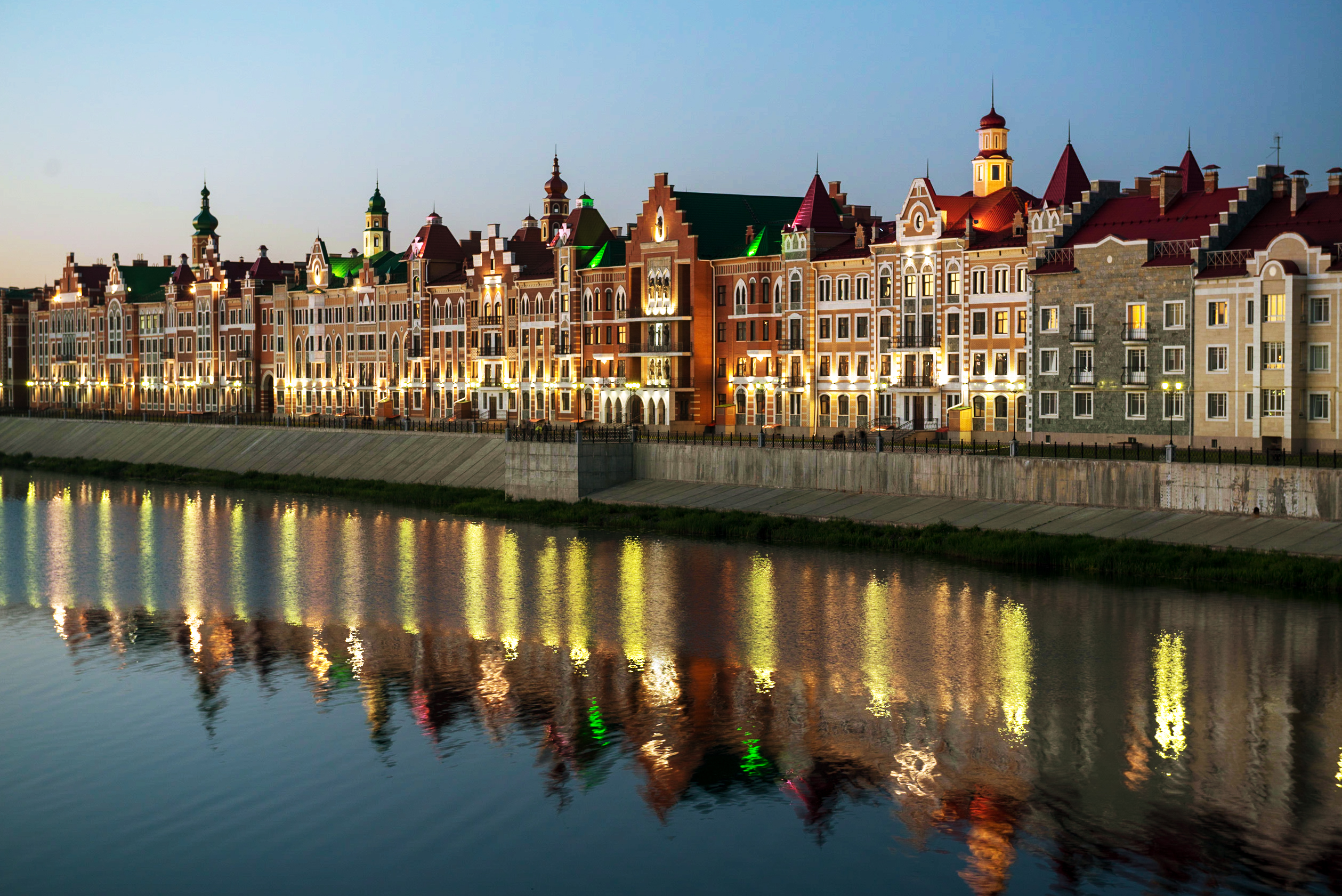
Yoshkar Ola at night

Yoshkar-Ola is the capital of the Mari El Republic. Within the framework of administrative divisions, it is, together with ten rural localities, incorporated as the city of republic significance of Yoshkar-Ola —an administrative unit with the status equal to that of the districts. As a municipal division, the city of republic significance of Yoshkar-Ola is incorporated as Yoshkar-Ola Urban Okrug.

== Transport ==
Yoshkar-Ola is linked to other cities and regions in Russia by a series of train and bus routes. The local train station is currently served by a daily train to and from the capital Moscow with other short-service trains running to and from Kazan. Moscow and various other nearby towns and regions can also be reached by buses departing from the local bus station. The Yoshkar-Ola Airport is also located 9 km north of the city and handles small aircraft Moscow-bound flights (Vnukovo International Airport) since April 2012.

Destinations within the city limits can be reached through a network of buses, trolleys, and route taxis, or marshrutkas.

== Economy ==
The 4th Kiev-Zhitomir Rocket Division of the 27th Guards Missile Army of the Strategic Rocket Forces is located nearby.

In the Yoshkar-Ola area there are two Arsenals of the Russian Armed Forces, the 116th, and the other the 11th Navy Arsenal. Of these, the 116th arsenal became part of OAO Oboronservis / Remvooruzhenie.

Yoshkar-Ola has a prison colony, which came to international attention in September 2022 as the location of a Wagner Group video in which Yevgeny Prigozhin promised convicts they would be released from prison if they served a six-month combat tour in the war against Ukraine.

== Climate ==
The climate of Yoshkar-Ola is very similar to that of Nizhny Novgorod or Kirov. The city is situated in a warm-summer humid continental climate (Köppen Dfb). The winters are long and cold with much snow and average January temperatures between −10 and −15 °C (14 and 5 °F), and a record low of −47.3 °C (−53.1 °F). On the other hand, the city enjoys very warm summers, marred by only occasional, brief intervals of sultry or rainy conditions with July as the hottest month, when the average high is +25 °C (77 °F), and temperatures may stay around +35 °C (95 °F) for weeks.

Climate data for Yoshkar-Ola (1991-2020, extremes 1936-present)
Month	Jan	Feb	Mar	Apr	May	Jun	Jul	Aug	Sep	Oct	Nov	Dec	Year
Record high °C (°F)	4.5 (40.1)	7.4 (45.3)	15.8 (60.4)	28.9 (84.0)	33.4 (92.1)	36.8 (98.2)	38.7 (101.7)	39.1 (102.4)	31.6 (88.9)	23.9 (75.0)	13.0 (55.4)	7.2 (45.0)	39.1 (102.4)
Mean daily maximum °C (°F)	−7.3 (18.9)	−6.3 (20.7)	0.4 (32.7)	10.3 (50.5)	19.4 (66.9)	23.1 (73.6)	25.4 (77.7)	22.8 (73.0)	16.4 (61.5)	8.0 (46.4)	−0.6 (30.9)	−5.7 (21.7)	8.8 (47.8)
Daily mean °C (°F)	−10.5 (13.1)	−10.2 (13.6)	−3.9 (25.0)	4.9 (40.8)	12.8 (55.0)	17.0 (62.6)	19.3 (66.7)	16.8 (62.2)	11.1 (52.0)	4.4 (39.9)	−3.1 (26.4)	−8.4 (16.9)	4.2 (39.6)
Mean daily minimum °C (°F)	−13.7 (7.3)	−13.9 (7.0)	−7.8 (18.0)	0.2 (32.4)	6.7 (44.1)	11.3 (52.3)	13.5 (56.3)	11.5 (52.7)	6.8 (44.2)	1.4 (34.5)	−5.4 (22.3)	−11.2 (11.8)	0.0 (32.0)
Record low °C (°F)	−46.9 (−52.4)	−41.7 (−43.1)	−38.9 (−38.0)	−21.8 (−7.2)	−6.0 (21.2)	−2.5 (27.5)	2.0 (35.6)	−1.4 (29.5)	−7.5 (18.5)	−18.9 (−2.0)	−33.6 (−28.5)	−47.3 (−53.1)	−47.3 (−53.1)
Average precipitation mm (inches)	40 (1.6)	30 (1.2)	32 (1.3)	32 (1.3)	40 (1.6)	64 (2.5)	76 (3.0)	65 (2.6)	54 (2.1)	57 (2.2)	43 (1.7)	42 (1.7)	575 (22.6)
Average precipitation days	18.1	14.6	13.2	10.5	12.0	13.1	12.1	11.9	13.6	15.2	15.1	17.9	167.5
Mean monthly sunshine hours	40	81	138	199	271	286	295	239	145	76	34	23	1,827
Source 1: Pogoda.ru.net
Source 2: climatebase.ru (precipitation days, sun 1936-2012)

== Demographics ==
Historical population
Year	Pop.	±% p.a.
1897	1,700	—
1926	4,300	+3.25%
1939	27,179	+15.24%
1959	88,744	+6.10%
1970	166,073	+5.86%
1979	201,371	+2.16%
1989	241,601	+1.84%
2002	256,719	+0.47%
2010	248,782	−0.39%
2021	281,248	+1.12%
Source: Census Data

According to the 2021 Census, Yoshkar-Ola has a population of 281,248 people, making it the 71st largest city in Russia. The urban area of the city is 291,892 people.

Following the 2010 Census, the ethnic makeup of Yoshkar-Ola is:

Ethnicity	Population	Percentage
Russians	152,447	61.28%
Mari	58,001	23.31%
Tatars	10,202	4.10%
Ukrainians	2,075	0.83%
Other	5,438	2.2%

== Education ==
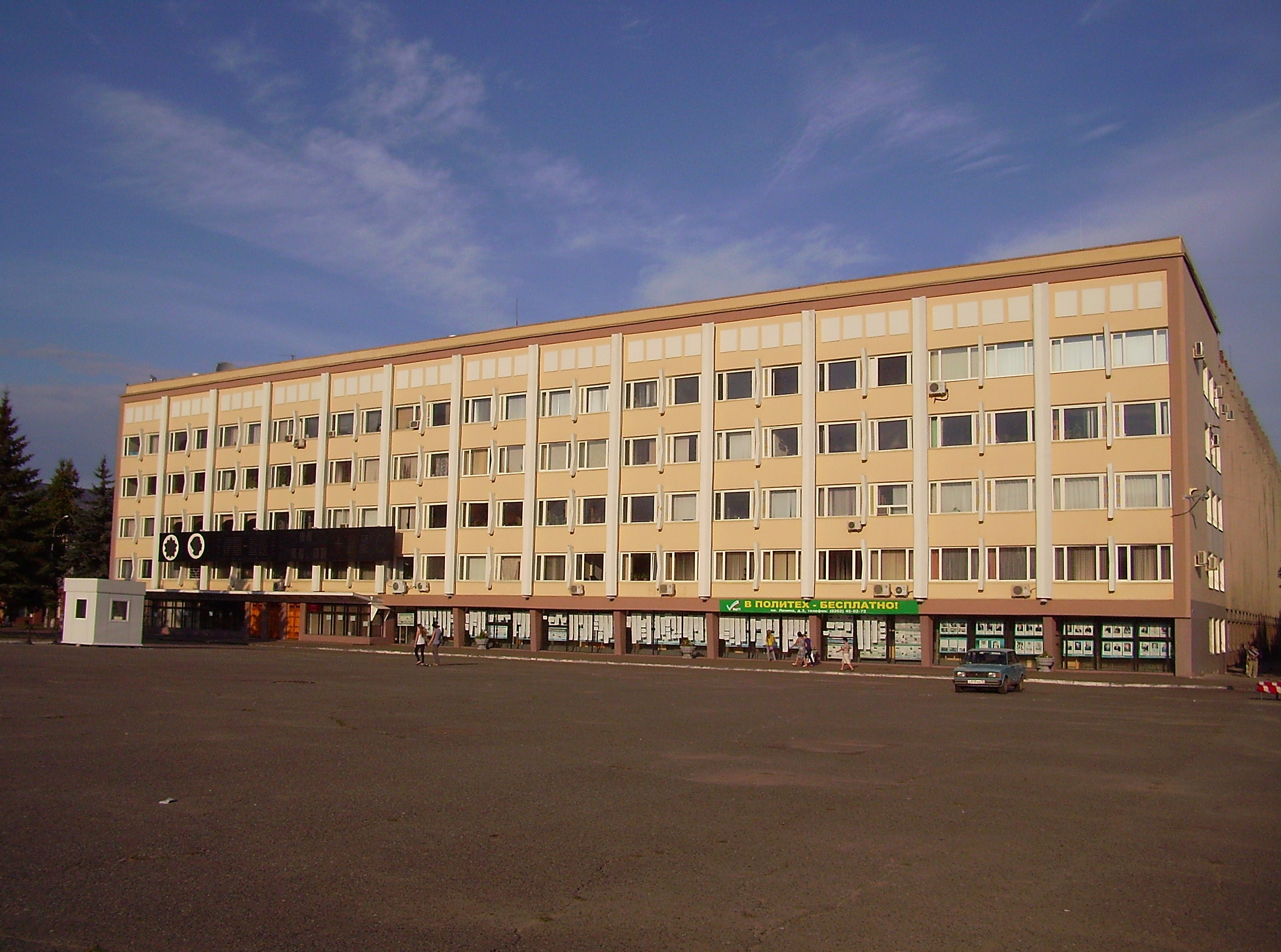
The main building of Volga State University of Technology

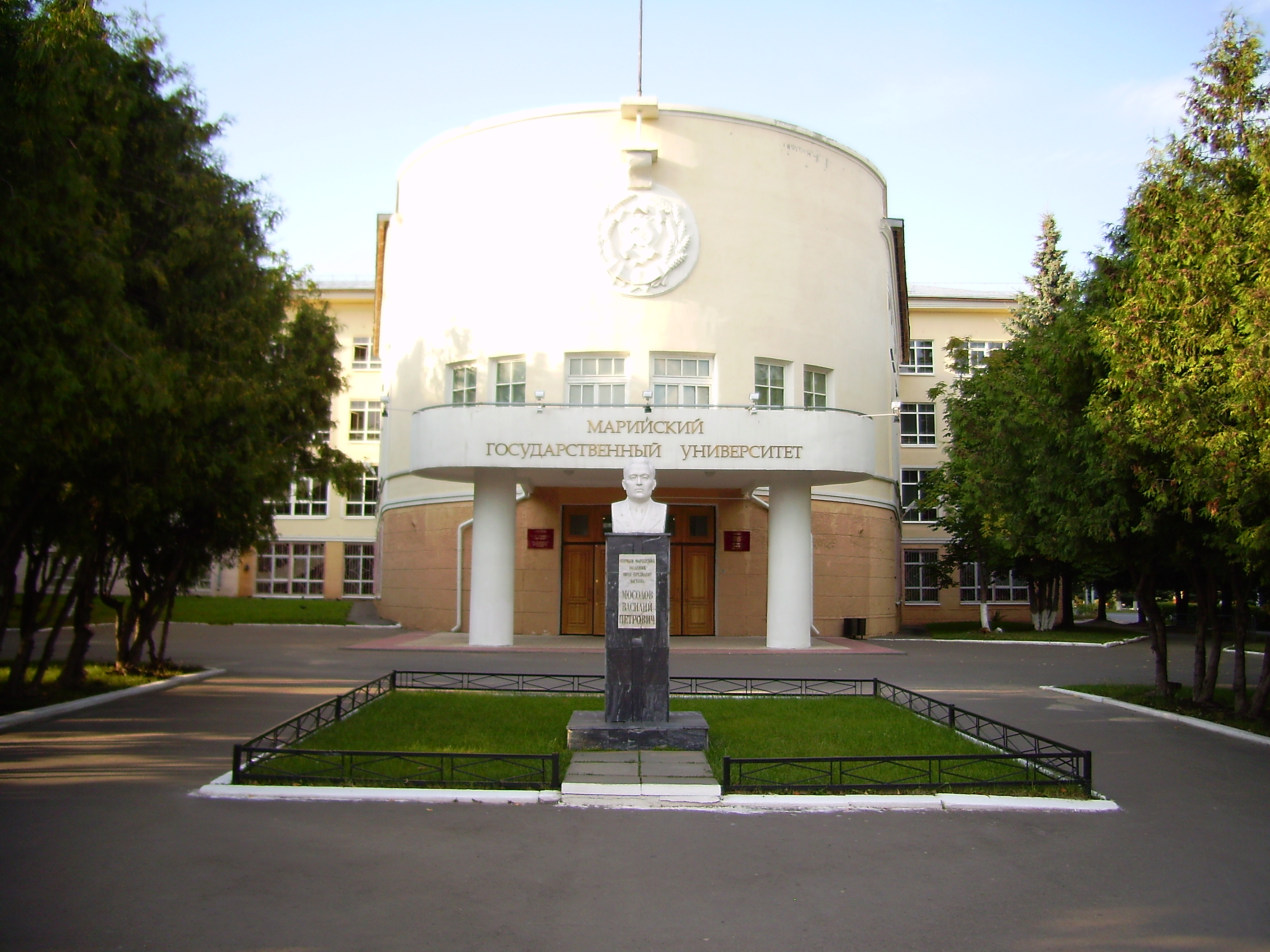
The main building of Mari State University

Yoshkar-Ola is home to 88 educational institutions, among them several institutions of higher education, including:

- Mari State University
- Volga State University of Technology (before 2012, Mari State Technical University)
- Interregional Open Social Institute

There are also 30 schools for primary students aged between 7 and 18 and 52 kindergartens. Additionally, Yoshkar-Ola has many private educational centers offering different qualifications and trainings in such disciplines as foreign languages, computer science and many others.

== Twin towns – sister cities ==
Yoshkar-Ola is twinned with:

- Bourges, France
- Princeton, West Virginia, United States
- Szombathely, Hungary
