= Lyubov Denisova =

Russian marathon runner

Personal information
- Nationality: Russian
- Born: 6 October 1971 (age 54) Volga, Russia
- Education: Volga Region State University of Physical Culture, Sport and Tourism
- Height: 1.63 m (5 ft 4 in)
- Weight: 47.5 kg (105 lb)

Sport
- Country: RSA
- Events: Cross country, Marathon

Lyubov Denisova (née Belavina; Russian: Любо́вь Вале́рьевна Дени́сова; born 6 October 1971) is a Russian middle- and long-distance runner. She is an athlete who earned the Russian title of "Master of Sports of International Class", a winner of multiple major marathons in the United States who served a suspension in 2007-2009 for use of performance-enhancing drugs.

== Professional career ==
Denisova first ran a marathon in 1993, when she finished eighth at the Russian Open Marathon Championship in Kaliningrad, running a 2:42:47.

At the 1996 Russian Open Marathon Championship in Moscow, she became a bronze medalist (2:46:18), losing to Irina Timofeyeva and Lyubov Morgunova. The same year, she ran the Dalian International Marathon (finishing in 2:36:09) and took part in the European Cross Country Championships in Charleroi.

In 2001, she traveled to the United States to race in Grandma's Marathon, a race named after the Grandma's Restaurant. She started in Two Harbors with thousands of other runners and ran along the shore of Lake Superior to Duluth, Minnesota, leading all the women and winning in 2:35:13. Her win set in motion a Russian woman's dominance of the race for the next four years as Zinaida Semenova and Firiya Sultanova rolled to wins.

She also won the Long Beach Marathon, took 11th in the Twin Cities Marathon and finished fourth in the Hong Kong Standard Chartered Marathon that year.

In 2002, she won the Los Angeles Marathon (in 2:28:49) and placed second at the New York Marathon coming in one minute behind Joyce Chepchumba, crossing the tape with a time of 2:26:17.

In 2003, she faced the best runners in the world and took the Newton Hills as she stormed to a second-place finish at the Boston Marathon in 2:26:51.

At the 2004 New York City Marathon, she placed third, setting her own personal best of 2:25:18. She was considered as a candidate for participation in the Summer Olympics at Athens, but in the end, the Russian coaching staff chose other runners.

In 2005, she again won the Los Angeles Marathon (2:26:11).

At the 2006 Honolulu Marathon, Denisova ran 2:27:19, a race record.

Denisova tested positive for an elevated testosterone-to-epitestosterone ratio 20 March 2007. On 15 May 2007 it was announced that she was banned for two years. She has since become a mother and returned to running.

In 2012, 2013 and 2015 she won the Detroit Marathon. In 2017 and 2018, she won the Albany Marathon. In 2018, she won the Miami Marathon.

== Personal life ==
Denisova graduated from the Volga Region State University of Physical Culture, Sport and Tourism. She is a mother and is married to Maxim Denisov, and together they work as a trainers at the Moscow running club, Gepard. Denisova cites Gainesville, Florida as her home in the US.

== Achievements ==
- All results regarding marathon, unless stated otherwise

Year	Competition	Venue	Position	Notes
Representing Russia
1999	Reading Half Marathon	Reading, United Kingdom	1st	1:15:18
2001	Grandma's Marathon	Duluth, United States	1st	2:35:13
2002	Los Angeles Marathon	Los Angeles, United States	1st	2:28:49
2005	Los Angeles Marathon	Los Angeles, United States	1st	2:26:11
2006	Honolulu Marathon	Honolulu, Hawaii	1st	2:27:19
2016	Bimbo Global Energy Race - 10K	Orlando, Florida	1st	00:37:30

== See also ==
- List of sportspeople sanctioned for doping offences
