= Volzhsky =

Volzhsky (masculine), Volzhskaya (feminine), or Volzhskoye (neuter) may refer to:

- Volzhsky District, name of several districts and city districts in Russia
- Volzhsky (inhabited locality) (Volzhskaya, Volzhskoye), name of several inhabited localities in Russia
- Volzhskaya (Moscow Metro), a station of the Moscow Metro, Moscow, Russia

== See also ==
- Volga (disambiguation)
- Privolzhsky (disambiguation)
- Volzhsk
