= Volga (disambiguation) =

The Volga is a river of Russia.

Volga may also refer to:

== Places ==
=== Russia ===
- Volga, Russia, several rural localities in Russia
- Volga Delta, the delta of the Volga River
- Volga economic region
- Volga Highway, or M7 highway (Russia)
- Volga Federal District
- Volga Region, an historical region
- Volga Reservoir
- Volga Upland

=== United States ===
- Volga, Indiana, an unincorporated town
- Volga, Iowa, a city
- Volga Township, Clayton County, Iowa
- Volga, Kentucky, an unincorporated community
- Volga, South Dakota, a city
- Volga, Texas, an unincorporated community
- Volga, West Virginia, an unincorporated community
- Volga River (Iowa), a river

== Personal name ==
- Darya Volga (born 1974), Ukrainian TV and film personality
- Volga Hayworth (1897–1945), American dancer and vaudevillian.
- Volga Svyatoslavich, Russian epic hero
- Volga, pen name of P. Lalita Kumari, Telugu female writer
- Volga, a character in Hyrule Warriors

== Organizations and businesses ==
- Volga (automobile), a Russian brand
- Volga (finance), in quantitative finance, a second order derivative of an option pricing formula versus volatility
- Air Volga, a former airline headquartered in Moscow
- VoLGA Forum, an organization of telecommunication vendors and operators
- VolgaTelecom, Russian telecommunications company

== Sports and games ==
- FC Volga Ulyanovsk
- Volga Ulyanovsk Bandy Club
- Volga Gambit, original name of the Benko Gambit in chess

== Technology ==
- Volga (brand), brand of Soviet cars by GAZ plant, several models
- Volga-class motorship, a type of Russian river passenger ship
- Russian patrol ship Volga
- Volga radar, a Russian early warning radar in Belarus
- Volga (rocket stage), a rocket upper stage designed in Russia

== Other uses ==
- 1149 Volga, an asteroid
- Operation Volga or 2 June 2006 Forest Gate raid on alleged terrorists by Metropolitan Police in London, England
- Volga rice, Japan

== See also ==
- The Song of the Volga Boatmen
- Volha
