= Victory Park (Saratov) =

Park in Saratov

- Interactive map of Victory Park
- Type: Park, Memorial, Cultural center
- Location: Russia, Saratov
- Coordinates: 51.5428°N 46.0581°E
- Created: 19 April 1975
- Status: All year

Victory Park (ru:Парк Победы (Саратов)) on Sokolovaya Mountain is a memorial park in the Volzhsky Municipal District (Russian: Волжский район) of Saratov, Russia. The park is dedicated to the Soviet victory in World War II.

== Geographic location ==
The park is located at 410003 Sokolovaya Street, Saratov, Saratov Region, Russia (Russian: ул. Соколовая, Саратов, Саратовская обл., Россия, 410003).

== History ==
Initial plans to establish a park on Sokolovaya Mountain date to 1956-1960. These plans came to fruition in 1971 on the eve of the 30th anniversary of the Soviet victory in World War II in 1941. The city council's executive committee allotted eighty hectares of land for the park, forming the basis of the park and a memorial complex. The area was landscaped, tree seedlings and shrubs were planted, and the park was divided into functional zones. The first secretary of the CPSU regional committee, Alexei Ivanovich Shibaev, laid a memorial stone in the foundation of the planned monument. In 1982, the memorial complex was completed, with a monument titled "The Cranes" as the centerpiece of the complex.

Climbing five steps up the front staircase leads to three 40 meter high vertical pylons featuring a wedge of cranes flying west and the Golden Star. The plan and architectural style of the memorial were inspired by a verse from the song “Zhuravli” (“The Cranes”) by Rasul Gamzatov that reads:

"I sometimes feel that the soldiers
Who have not returned from the bloody fields
Never lied down to earth
But turned into white cranes..."

At the foot of the monument is the “Fountain of Tears”, located at the front of the alley leading to “The Cranes.” An eternal flame burns atop the memorial stone, which reads:

"More than 300,000 Servetus did not return from World War II."

On May 9, 1999, the Saratov State Museum of Military Glory was inaugurated in Victory Park, featuring expositions of military and civilian equipment.

Victory Park is one of the most famous tourist sites in Saratov. One can describe this as a favorite place for citizens and guests of the city to relax. There are cafes and souvenir kiosks. The most beautiful panoramas of Saratov, the banks of the Volga, and Engels are visible from the park’s observation sites on Sokolovaya Mountain.

== The sites ==
Several monuments are located on the territory of Victory Park, including:

- "The Cranes" memorial complex (1982) by Menyakin Uriy;
- Monuments to juvenile prisoners of Nazism (2003) and liquidators of the consequences of nuclear accidents (2011);
- "Silent Bell", a memorial to Saratovites who fell on battlefields, by Andrey and Sergey Shcherbakovs (2000);
- “Alley of Heroes”, and “Alley of days of Russian military glory.”

The open-air Saratov State Museum of Military Glory contains tanks, planes, and artillery guns from WWII. The main park lane eventually leads inside the “Ethnic Village” with expositions representing the various indigenous peoples who lived in the Saratov Region.

== Photo ==
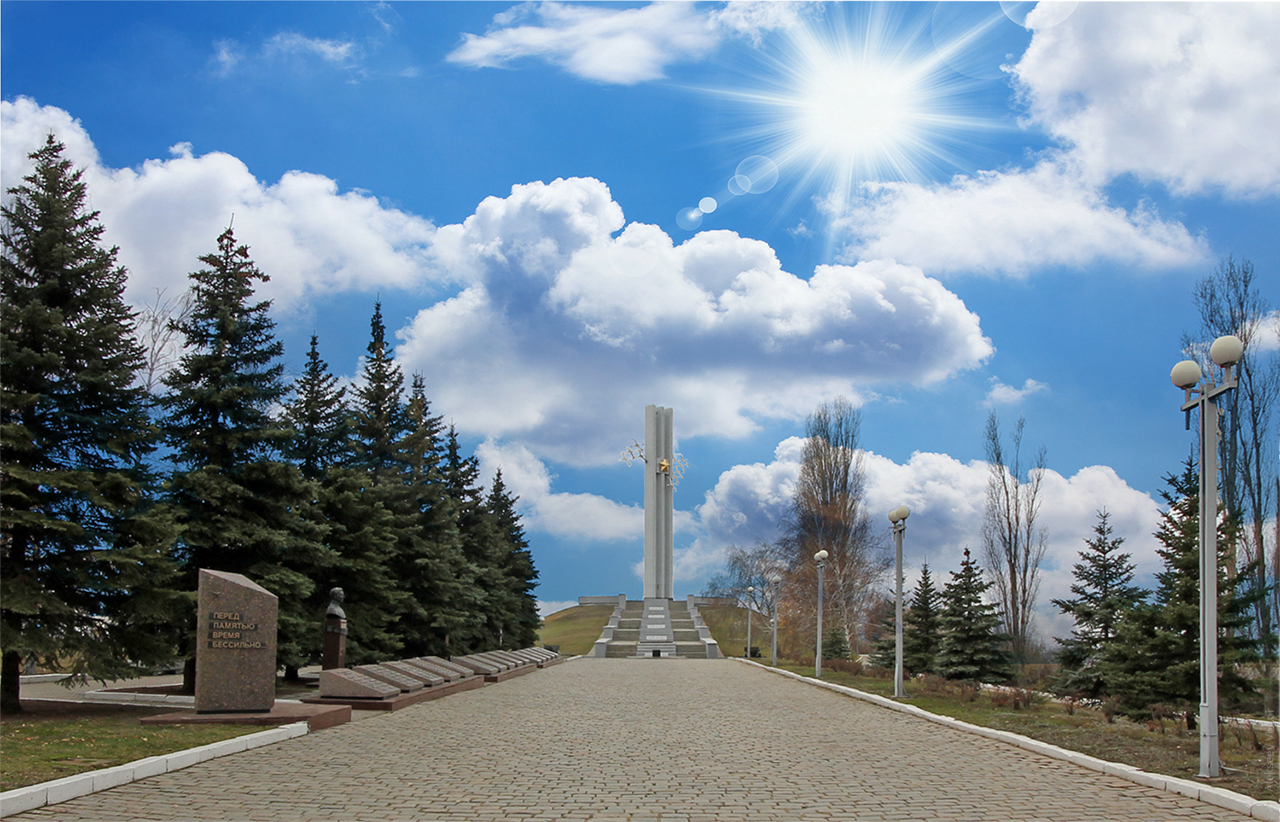

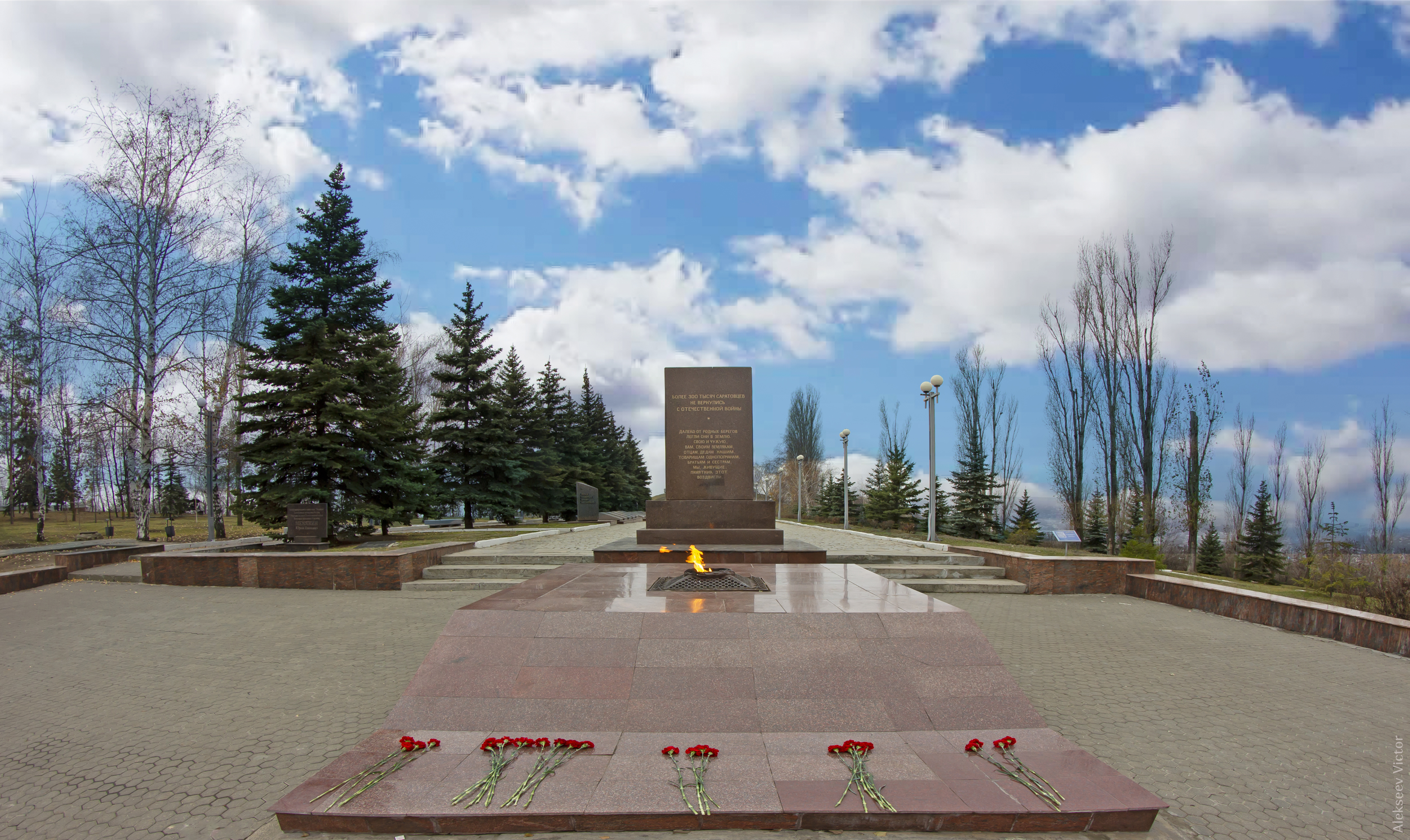

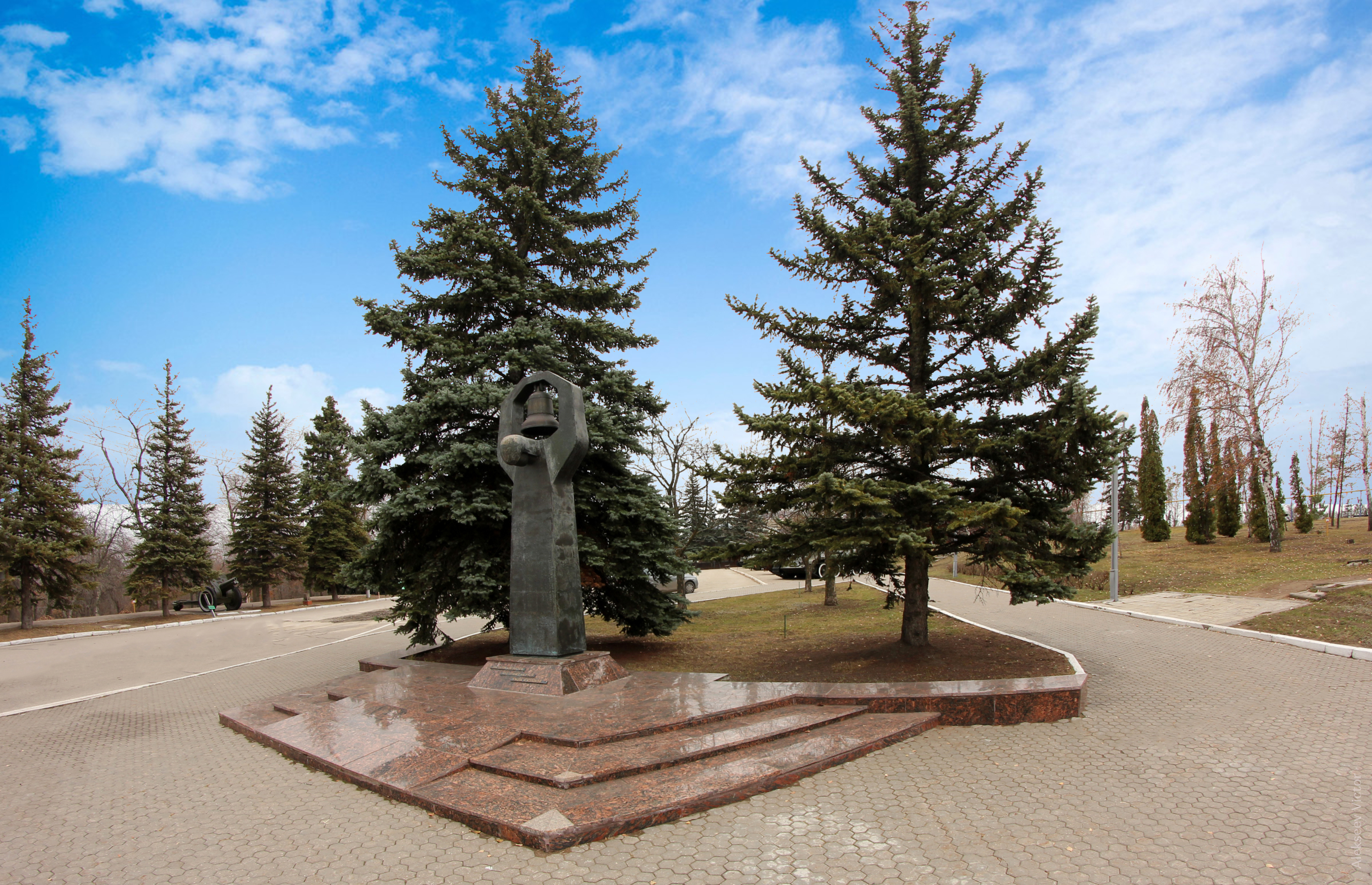

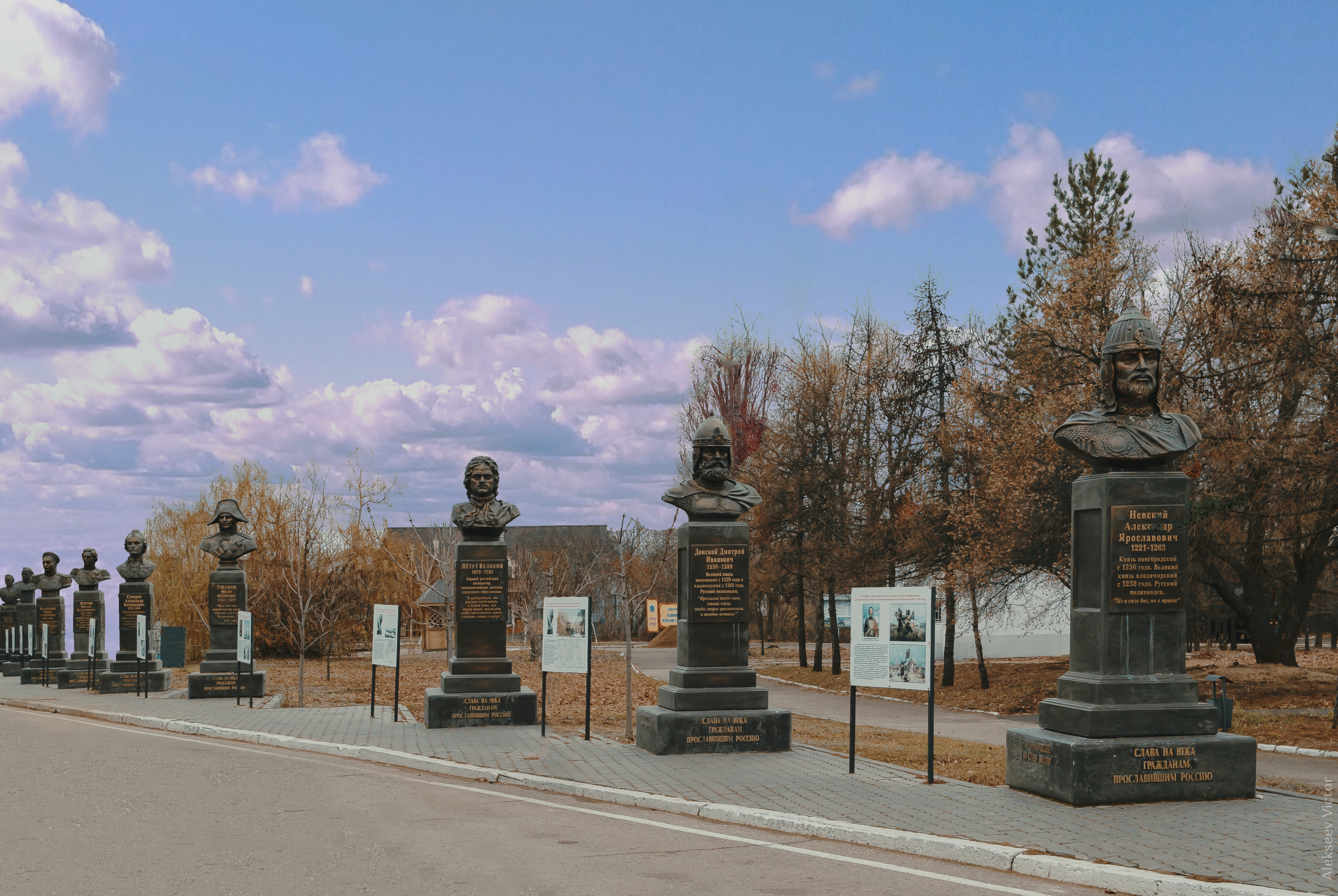

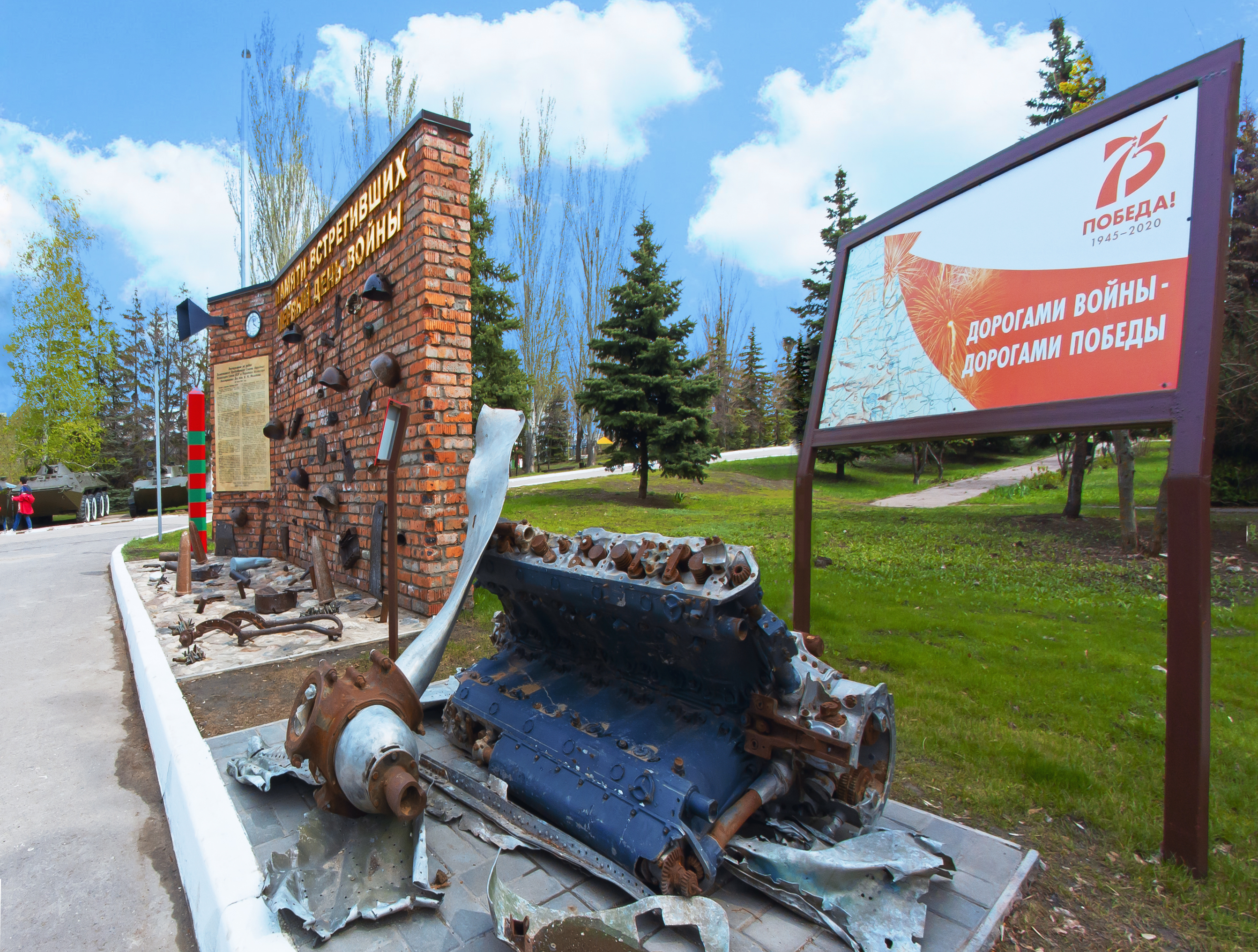

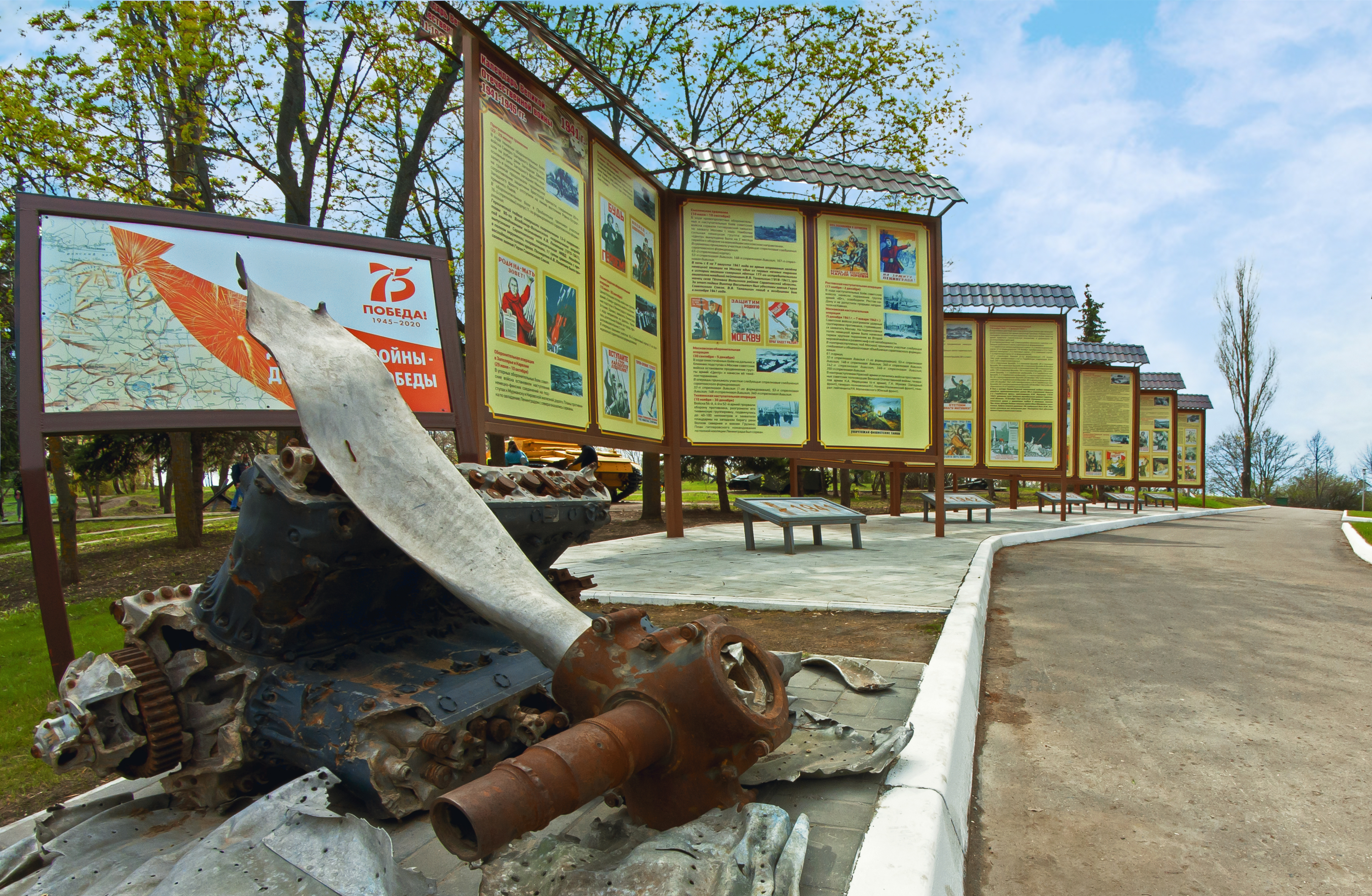

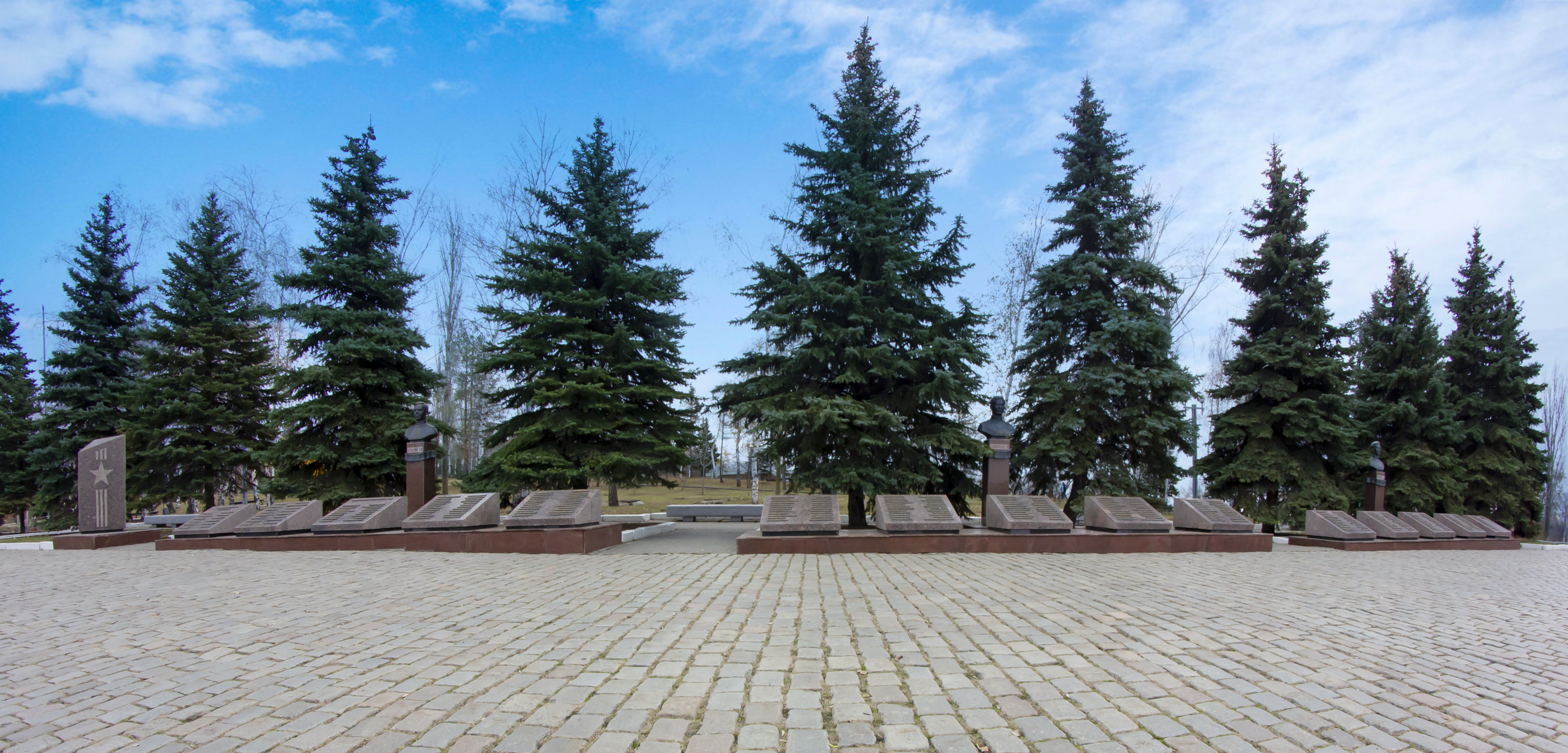

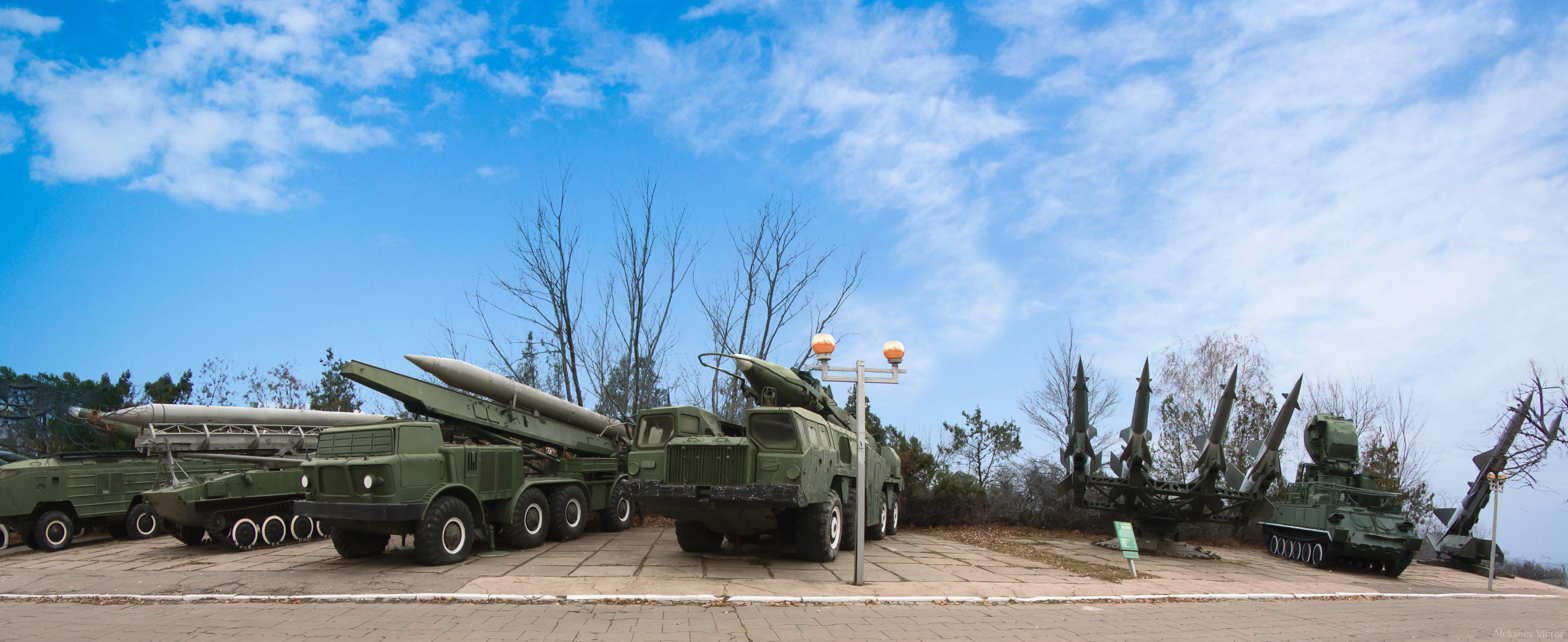

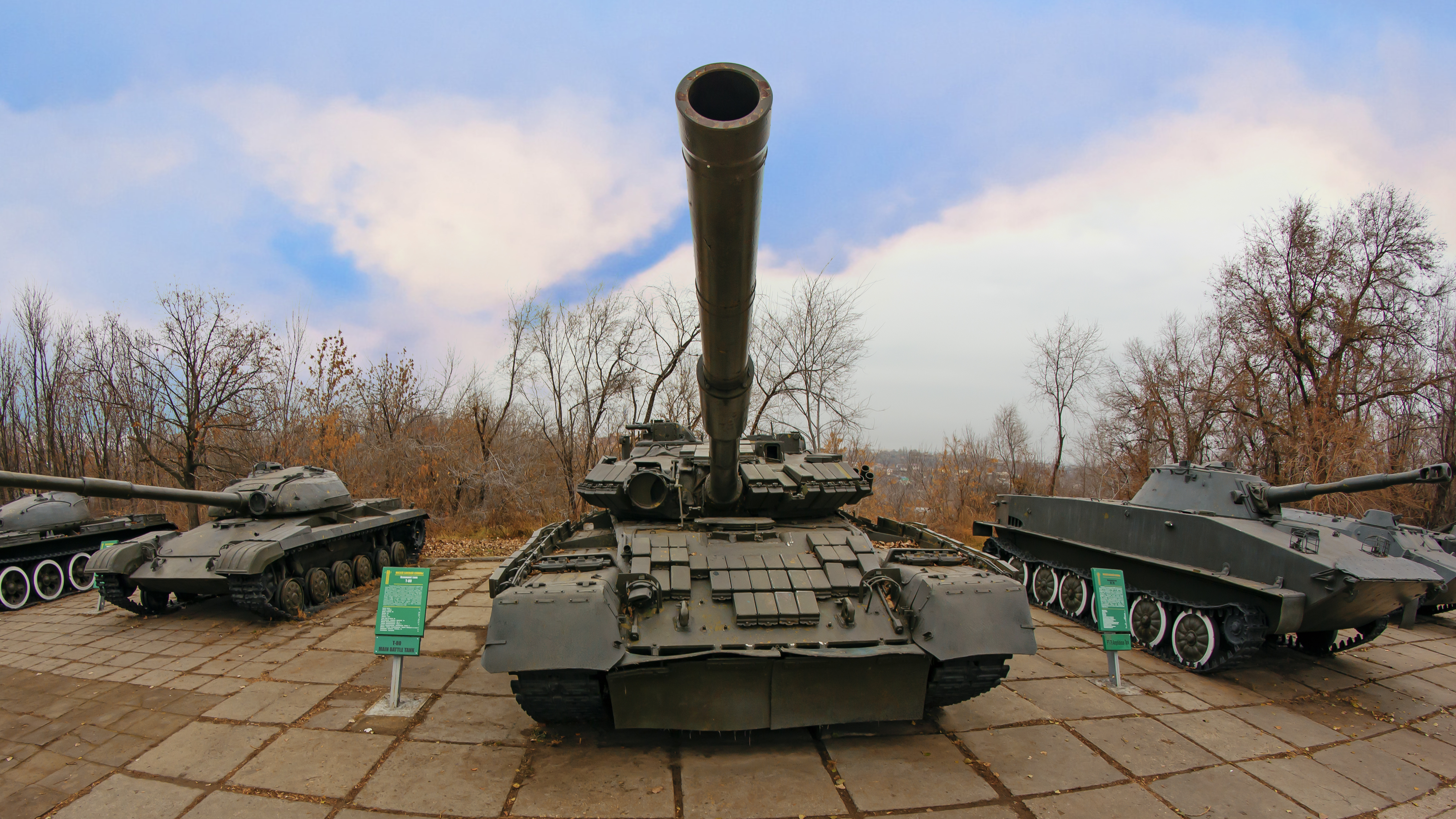

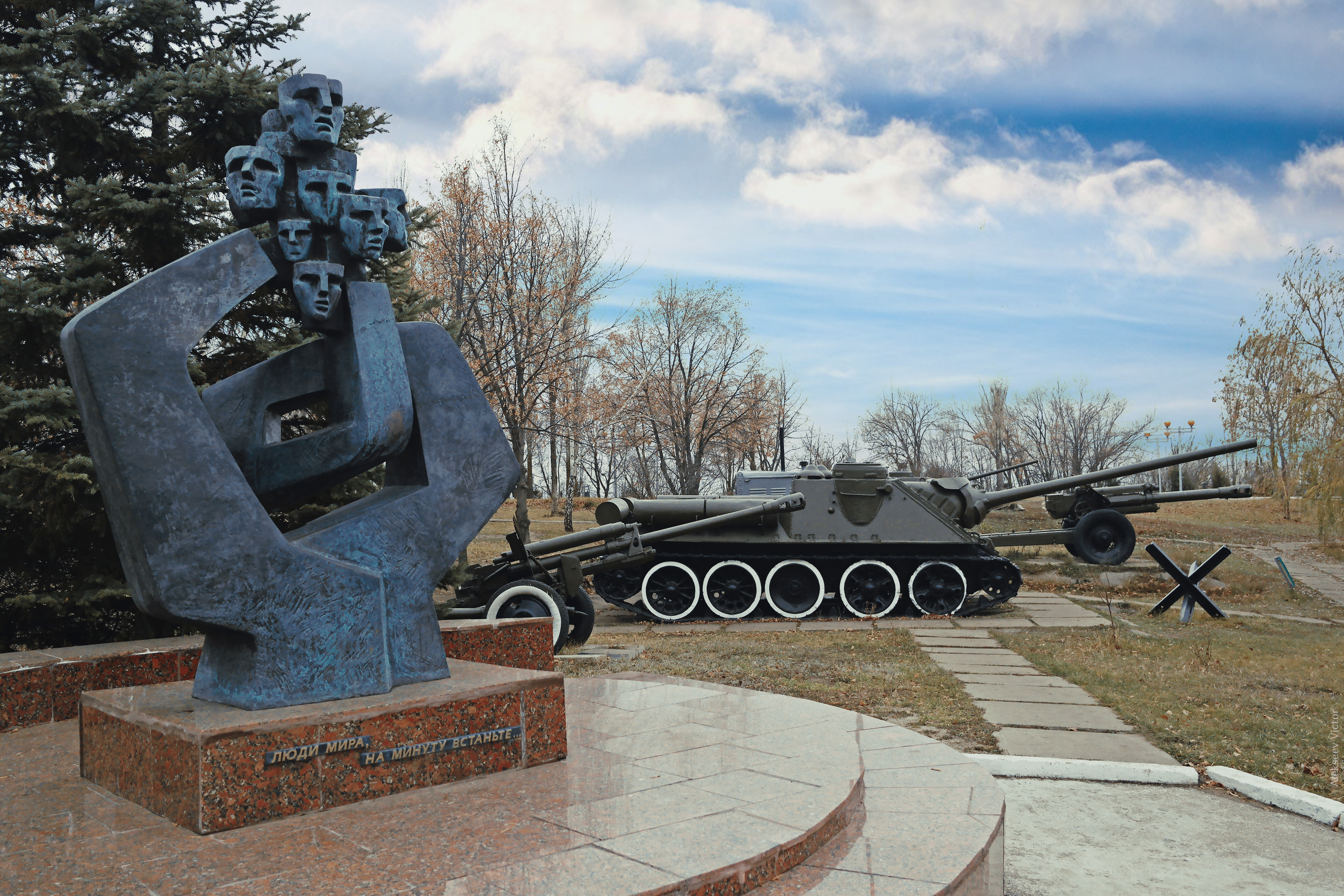

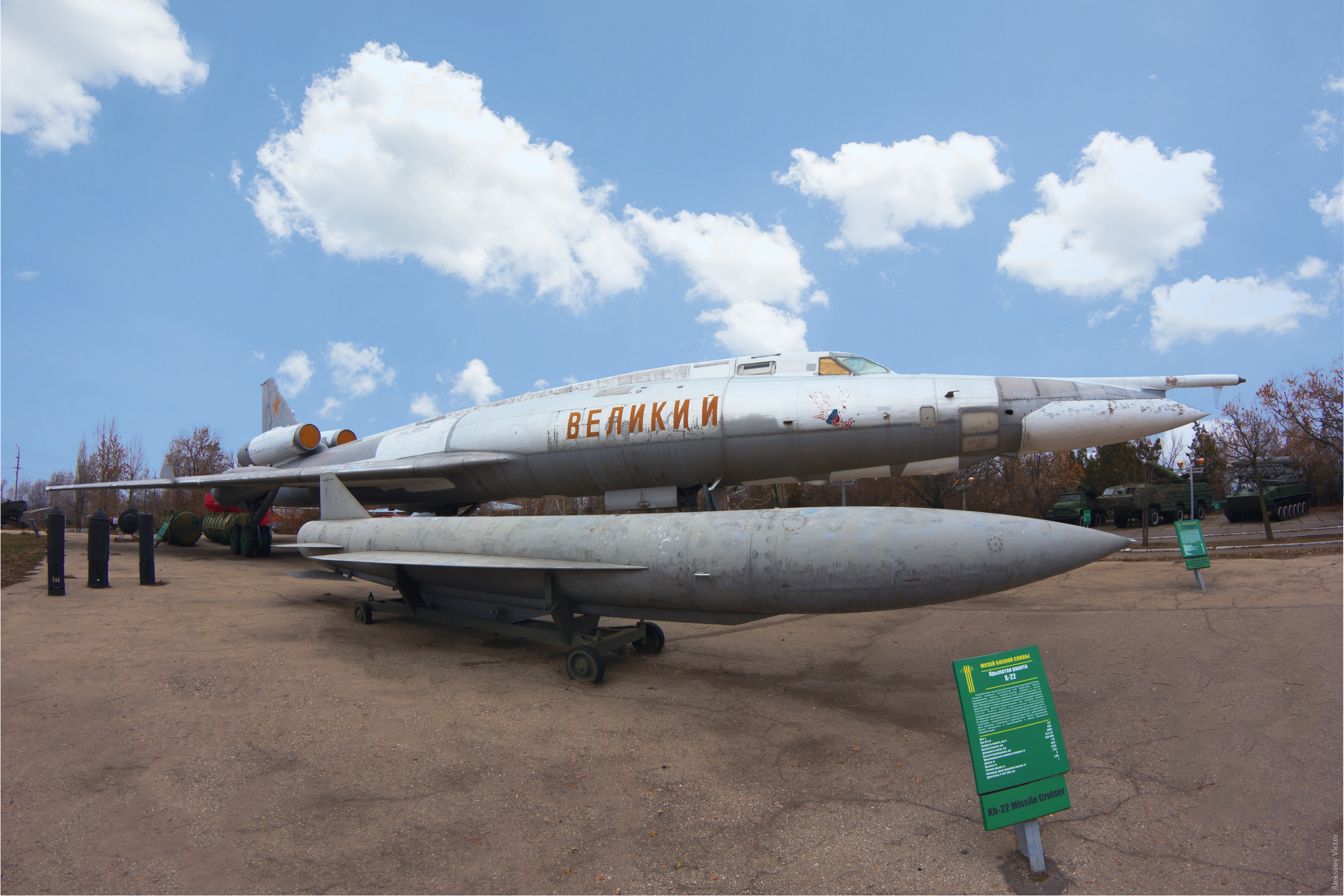

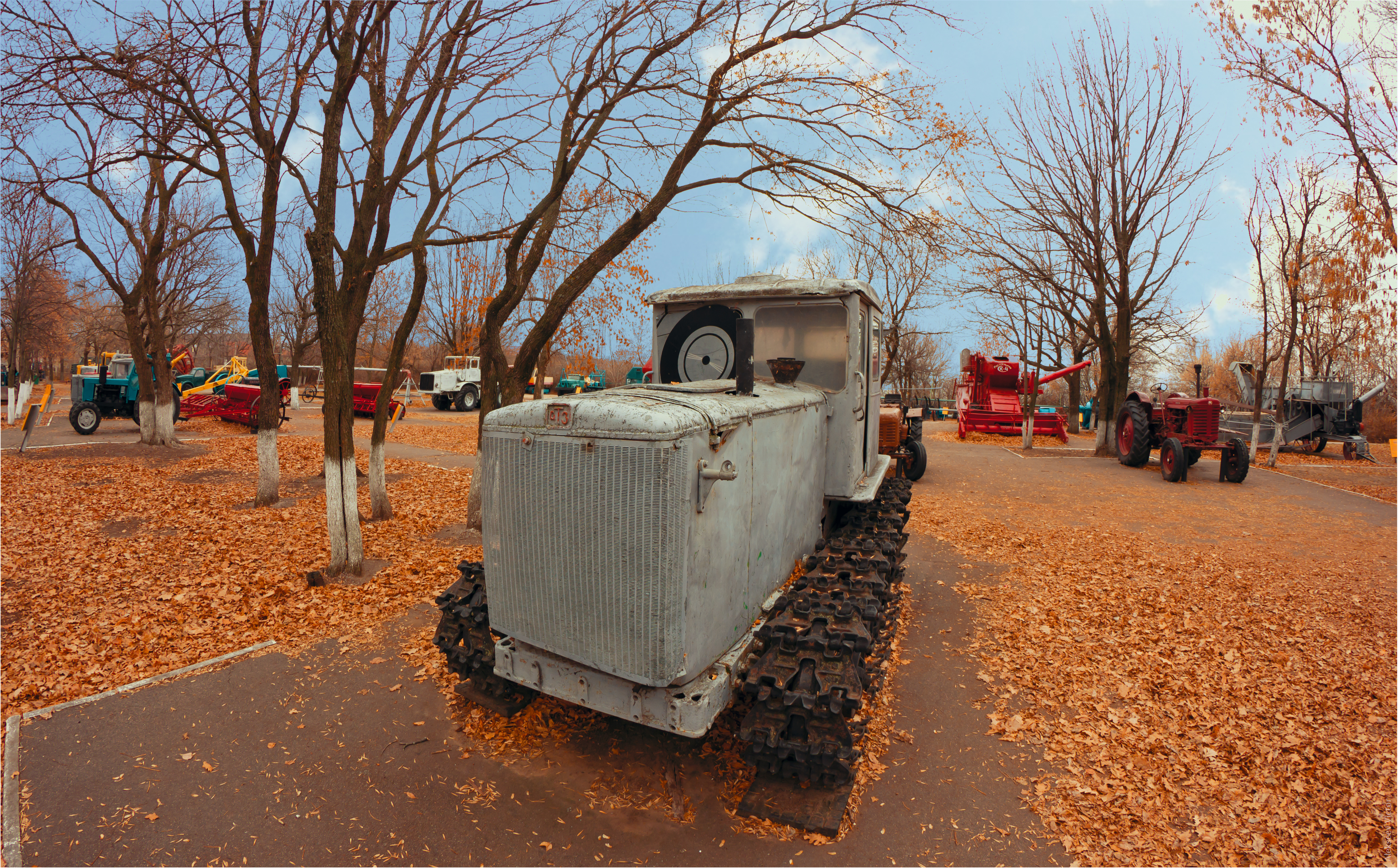

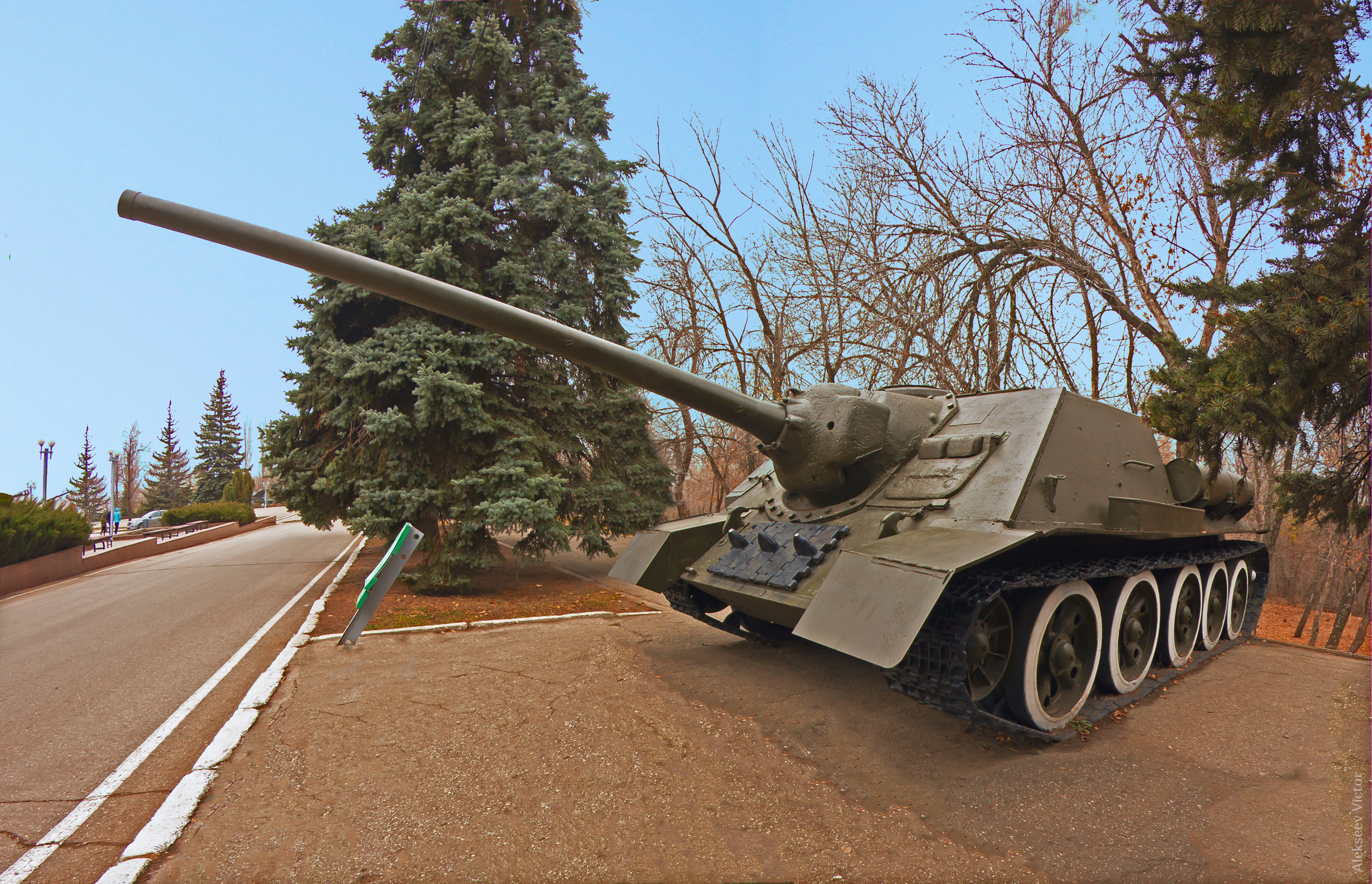

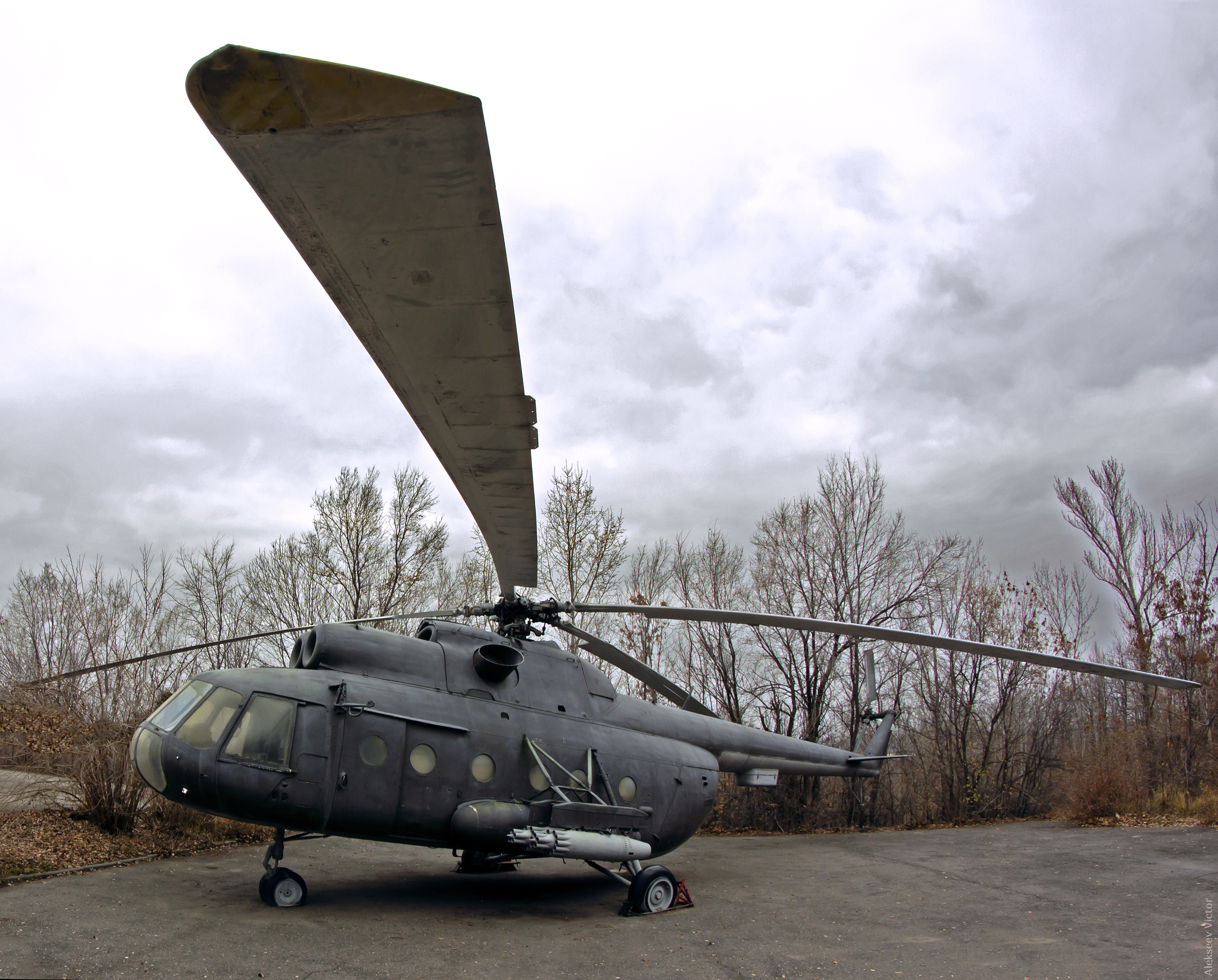

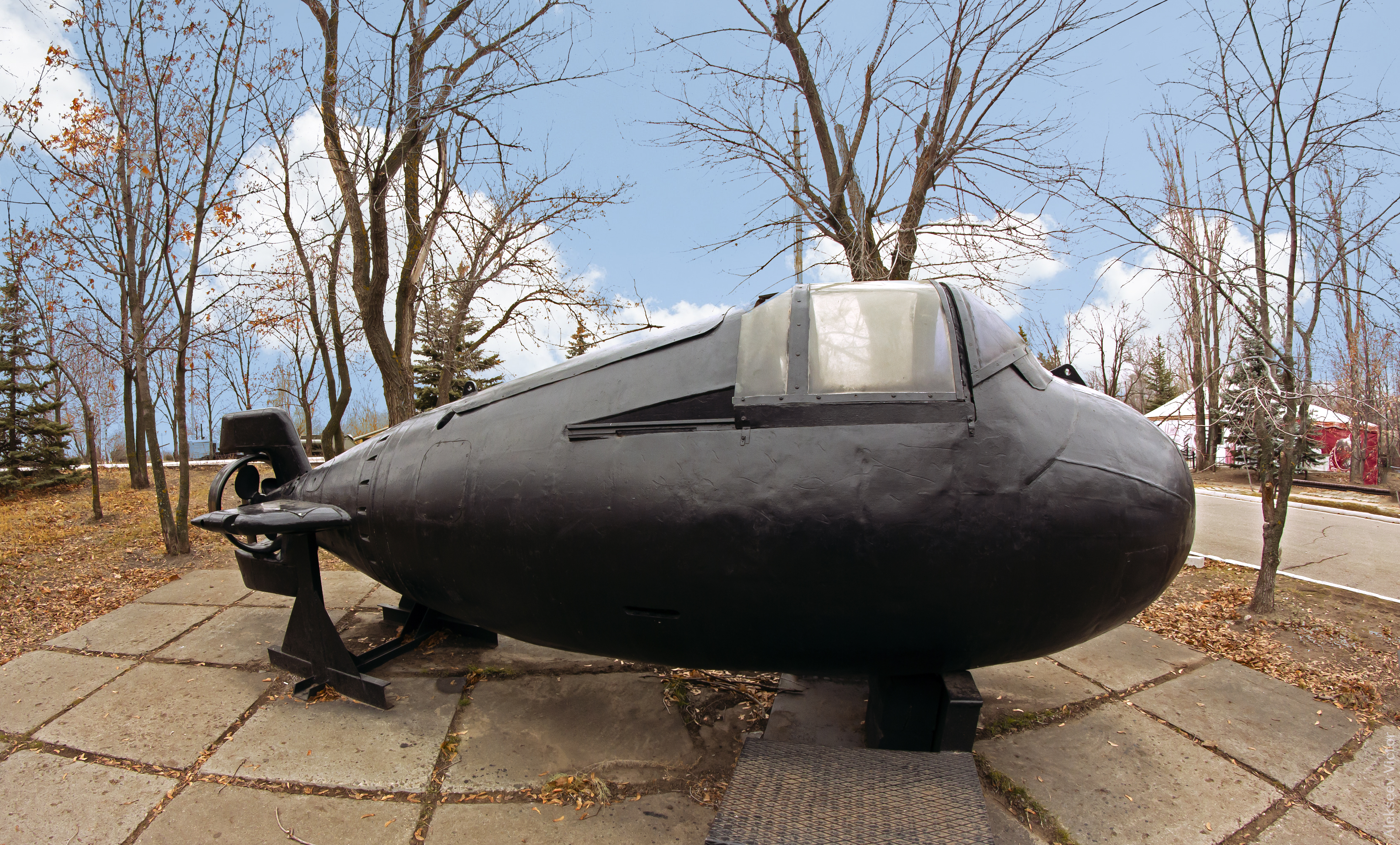

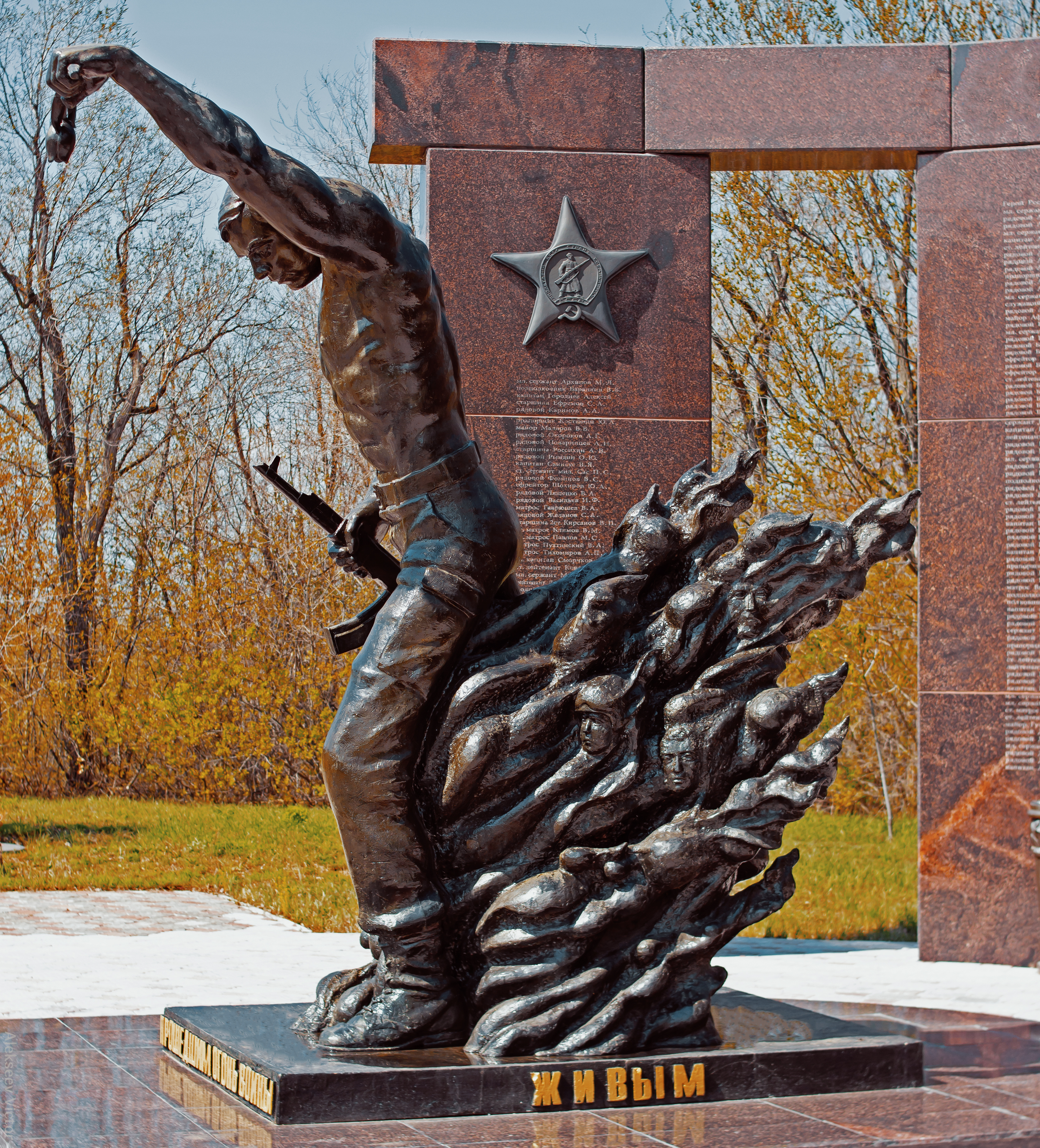
