= Privolzhsky District =

Volga Federal District in Russia

Location of Astrakhan Oblast in Russia

Location of Ivanovo Oblast in Russia

Location of Samara Oblast in Russia

Privolzhsky District is the name of several various districts in Russia. The name literally means "something near the Volga".

== Federal districts ==
- Volga Federal District (Privolzhsky federalny okrug), a federal district

== Districts of the federal subjects ==
- Privolzhsky District, Astrakhan Oblast, an administrative and municipal district of Astrakhan Oblast
- Privolzhsky District, Ivanovo Oblast, an administrative and municipal district of Ivanovo Oblast
- Privolzhsky District, Samara Oblast, an administrative and municipal district of Samara Oblast

== City divisions ==
- Privolzhsky City District, a city district of Kazan, the capital of the Republic of Tatarstan
Location of Kazan in Russia

== Military districts ==
- Volga Military District (Privolzhsky voyenny okrug), a territorial association of the Soviet (1918–1989) and Russian (1992–2001) armed forces

== See also ==
- Privolzhsky (disambiguation)
- Privolzhsk, a town in Ivanovo Oblast
- Volzhsky (disambiguation)
- Zavolzhsky (disambiguation)
- Volga (disambiguation)
