= Volzhsky (inhabited locality) =

Volzhsky (Russian: Во́лжский; masculine), Volzhskaya (Во́лжская; feminine), or Volzhskoye (Во́лжское; neuter) is the name of several inhabited localities in Russia.

== Urban localities ==
- Volzhsky, Volgograd Oblast, a city in Volgograd Oblast
- Volzhsky, Samara Oblast, an urban-type settlement in Krasnoyarsky District of Samara Oblast

== Rural localities ==
- Volzhsky, Astrakhan Oblast, a settlement in Srednevolzhsky Selsoviet of Yenotayevsky District of Astrakhan Oblast
- Volzhsky, Nizhny Novgorod Oblast, a settlement in Rabotkinsky Selsoviet of Kstovsky District of Nizhny Novgorod Oblast
- Volzhsky, Orenburg Oblast, a settlement in Volzhsky Selsoviet of Kurmanayevsky District of Orenburg Oblast
- Volzhsky, Yaroslavl Oblast, a settlement in Rodionovsky Rural Okrug of Tutayevsky District of Yaroslavl Oblast
- Volzhskoye, Astrakhan Oblast, a selo in Volzhsky Selsoviet of Narimanovsky District of Astrakhan Oblast
- Volzhskoye, Ulyanovsk Oblast, a selo in Zhedyayevsky Rural Okrug of Staromaynsky District of Ulyanovsk Oblast
- Volzhskaya (rural locality), a village in Kineshemsky District of Ivanovo Oblast
