= Privolzhsky =

Privolzhsky (masculine), Privolzhskaya (feminine), or Privolzhskoye (neuter) may refer to:

- Privolzhsky District, various divisions in Russia
- Privolzhsky Urban Settlement (or Privolzhskoye Urban Settlement), several municipal urban settlements in Russia
- Privolzhsky (inhabited locality) (Privolzhskaya, Privolzhskoye), several inhabited localities in Russia
