= Nasi goreng pattaya =

Southeast Asian stuffed omelette

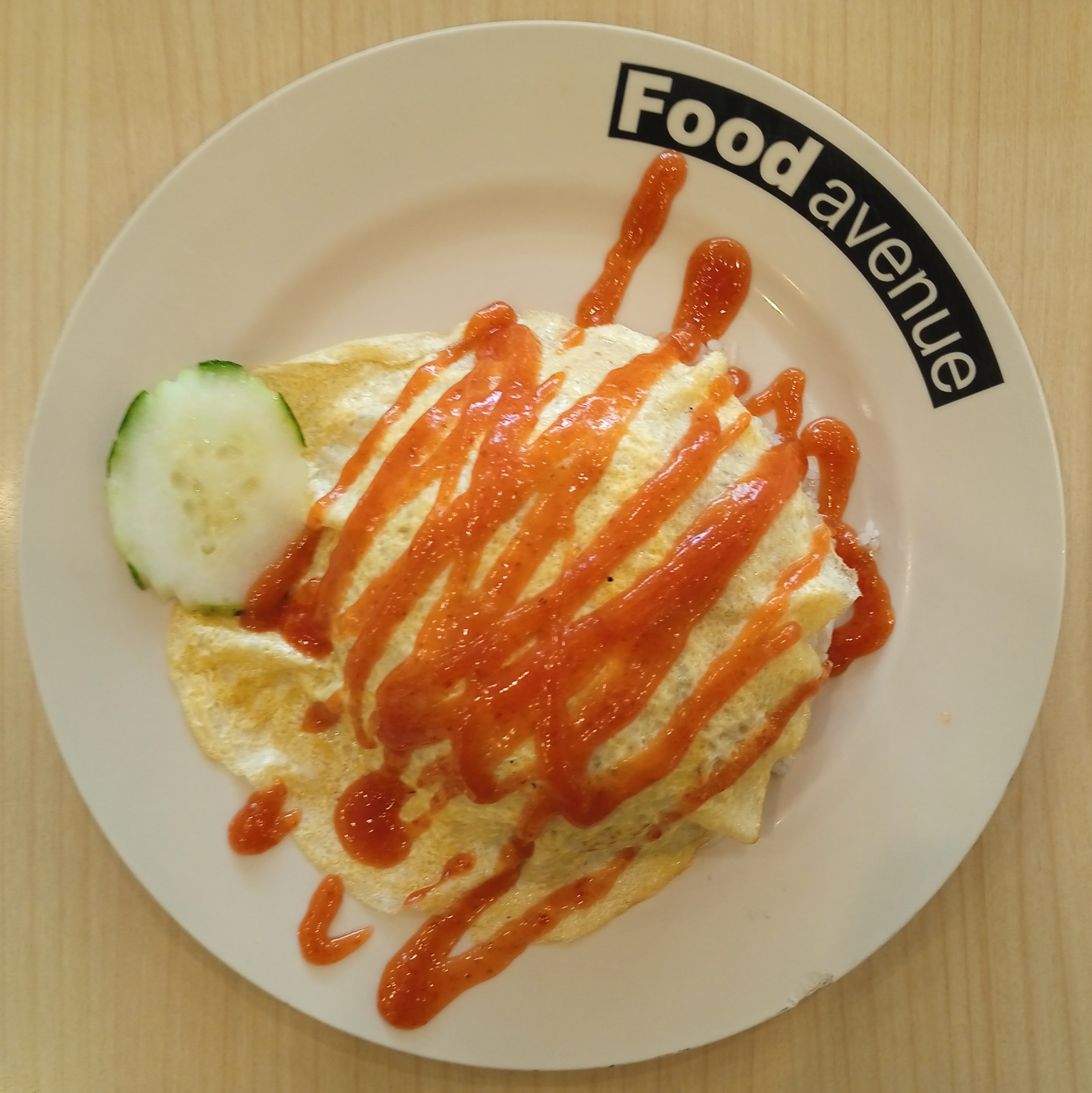
- A dish of nasi goreng pattaya in Kepong, Kuala Lumpur, Malaysia
- Type: Fried rice
- Place of origin: Malaysia
- Region or state: Southeast Asia
- Associated cuisine: Indonesia, Malaysia, and Singapore
- Main ingredients: Rice, egg, chicken, chili sauce, cucumber

Nasi goreng pattaya, or simply nasi pattaya, is a Southeast Asian fried rice dish made by covering or wrapping chicken fried rice in thin fried egg or omelette. Despite its apparent reference to the city of Pattaya in Thailand, the dish is believed to originate from Malaysia, and today is also commonly found in Singapore. It is often served with chili sauce, tomato ketchup, slices of cucumber, and keropok.

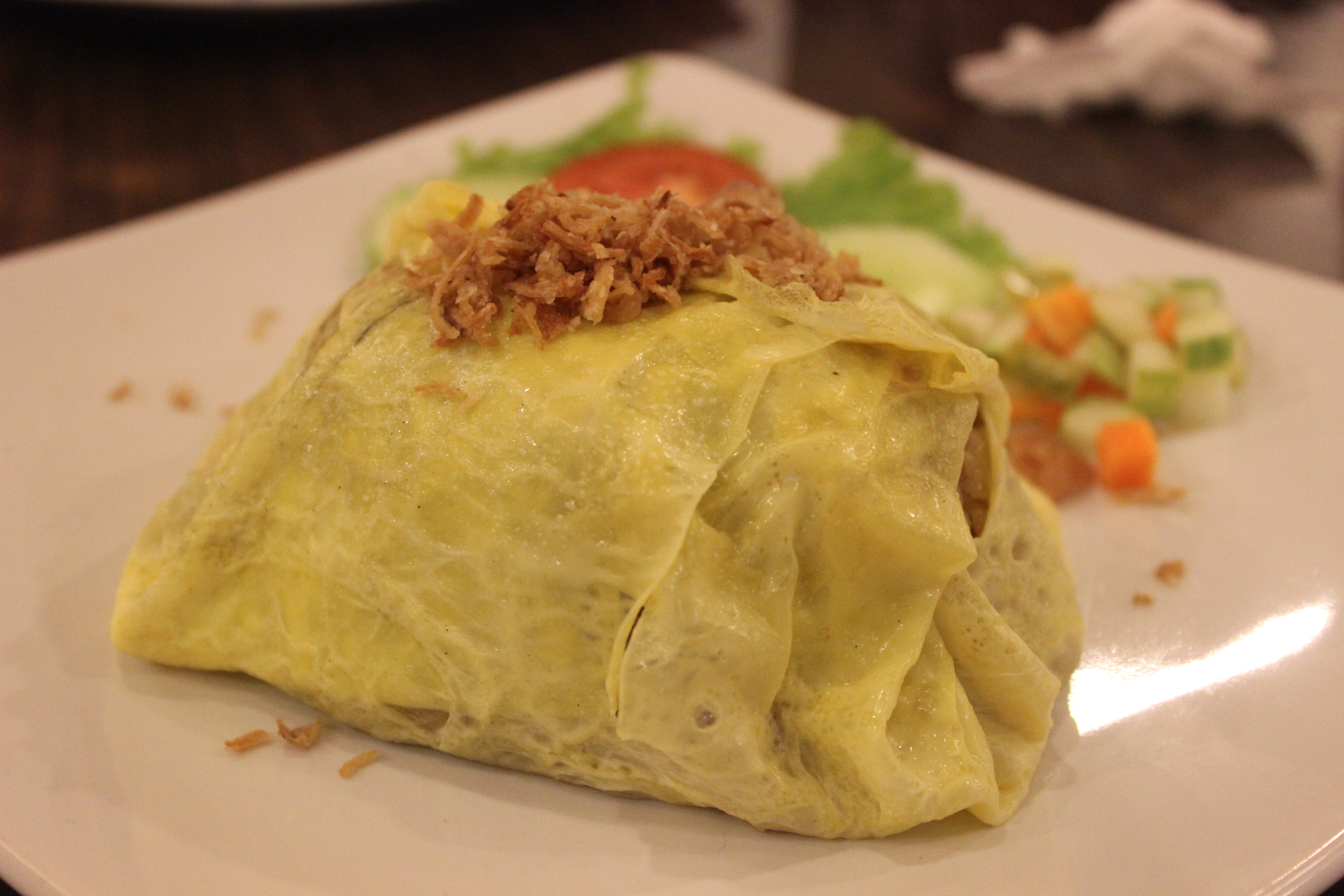
Indonesian version of nasi goreng pattaya in Pekanbaru, Sumatra

In Indonesia, this kind of nasi goreng is often called nasi goreng amplop (enveloped fried rice), since the nasi goreng is enveloped within a pocket of thin omelette. However, due to proximity and neighbouring influences, today this kind of fried rice is often also called nasi goreng pattaya in Indonesia. Today, the dish is popular throughout Southeast Asia, particularly in Malaysia, Indonesia and Singapore.

== Etymology and origin ==
The name is believed to be derived from Pattaya, a popular beach resort in Thailand. However, despite its Thai connotations, the dish is actually more common in Malaysia than in Thailand. The omelette-covered pattaya fried rice is hardly found in Pattaya itself. It is most likely that the dish did originate in Malaysia, and that the "Pattaya" moniker was probably used for novelty or marketing purposes.

== Similar dish ==
A similar dish exists in Japan, and is called omurice (from the English words omelette/omuretsu and rice). It is a fried ketchup-flavoured rice sandwiched with a thinly spread beaten egg or covered with a plain egg omelette.

== See also ==
- Fried egg
- Omurice
- Malay cuisine
- List of fried rice dishes
- Malaysian cuisine
