= Omurice =

Western-influenced Japanese dish consisting of an omelette with rice

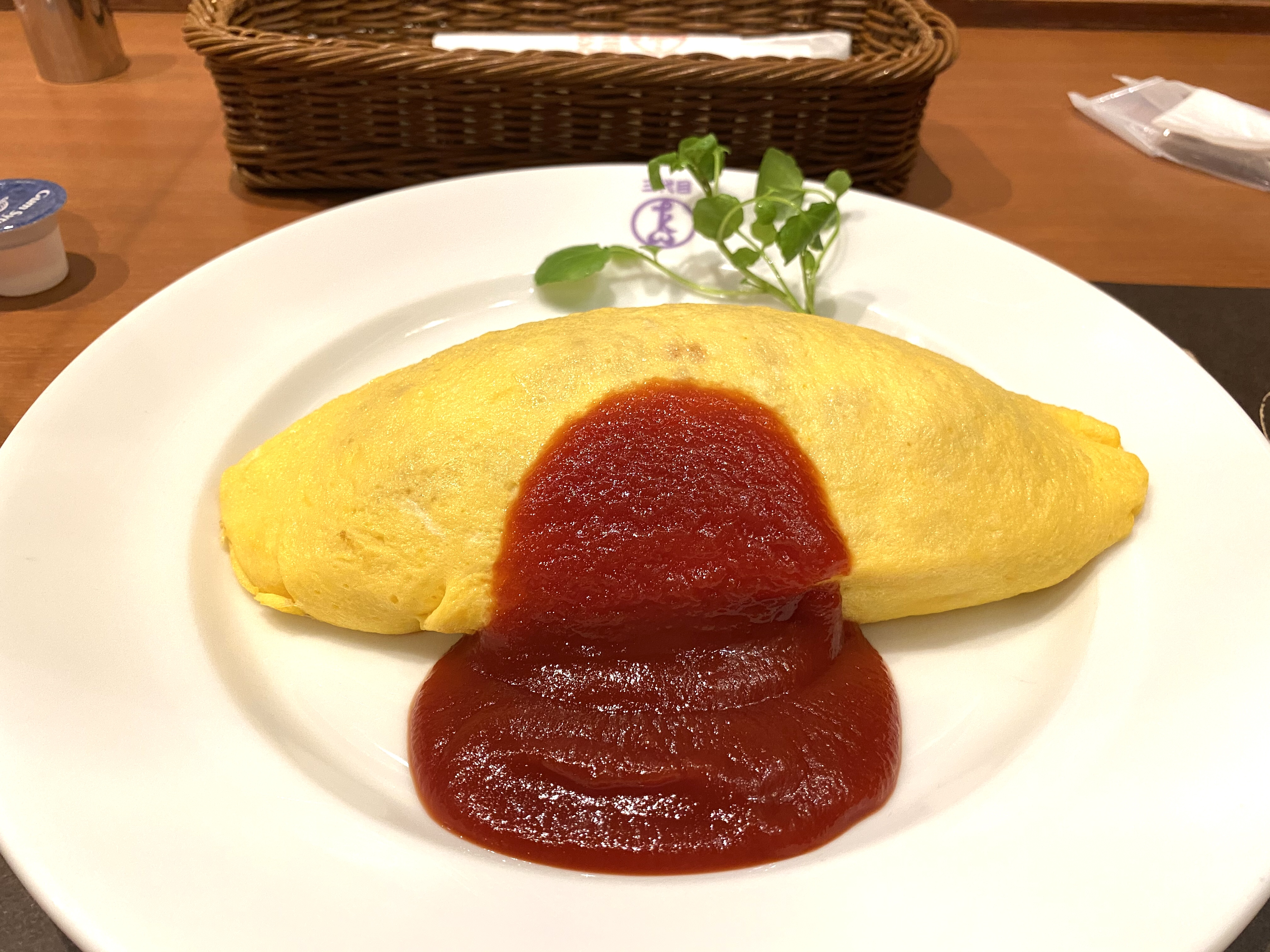
- Omurice topped with ketchup
- Alternative names: Japanese egg roll fried rice
- Place of origin: Japan
- Main ingredients: Chicken eggs, rice and ketchup optional
- Variations: Omu curry, omuhayashi (with hayashi rice), omu-soba, Tampopo omurice

Omurice or omu-rice (オムライス, omu-raisu) is a Japanese dish consisting of fried rice topped with a special omelette. Omurice is most commonly cooked at home. It is often featured in Japan's version of a children's meal, okosama-ranchi (お子様ランチ).

== Etymology ==
With omu and raisu being derived from the Japanese pronunciation of the French word omelette and the English word "rice", the name is an example of wasei-eigo.

== History ==
Stories about the origins of omurice vary, but both of them agree that One story says that it originated around the turn of the 20th century at a Western-style restaurant in Tokyo's Ginza district called Renga-Tei, inspired by chakin-zushi. This restaurant claims to be the first Western-style restaurant in Japan, since it opened in 1895. The local chef mixed rice into a French-style omelette, since Japanese customers wanted their Western-style dishes to be served with rice.

Another story says that the dish originated in 1925 at another Western-style restaurant – Hokkyokusei in Minami, Osaka, when a cook decided to enliven a regular customer's order of an omelet with rice. This customer ordered omelette with rice every single time, because they had a sensitive, often-upset stomach. Because of the monotony of his meals, chef decided to make this dish more special by wrapping ketchup rice in a thin omelette. That's when the word "omurice" was allegedly coined.

== Variations ==
The dish typically consists of chikin raisu(ja) (chicken rice: rice pan-fried with ketchup and chicken) wrapped in a thin sheet of fried, scrambled eggs. The ingredients flavoring the rice vary. Often, the rice is fried with various meats (but typically chicken) or vegetables, and can be flavored with beef stock, ketchup, demi-glace, white sauce, or simply salt and pepper. Sometimes, rice is replaced with fried noodles (yakisoba) to make omusoba. A variant in Okinawa is omutako, consisting of an omelet over taco rice. Fried hot dog and Spam are also two popular meats to include in the dish.

Volga rice is another variation, topped with crumb-covered pork cutlet with the whole dish covered in a rich sauce.

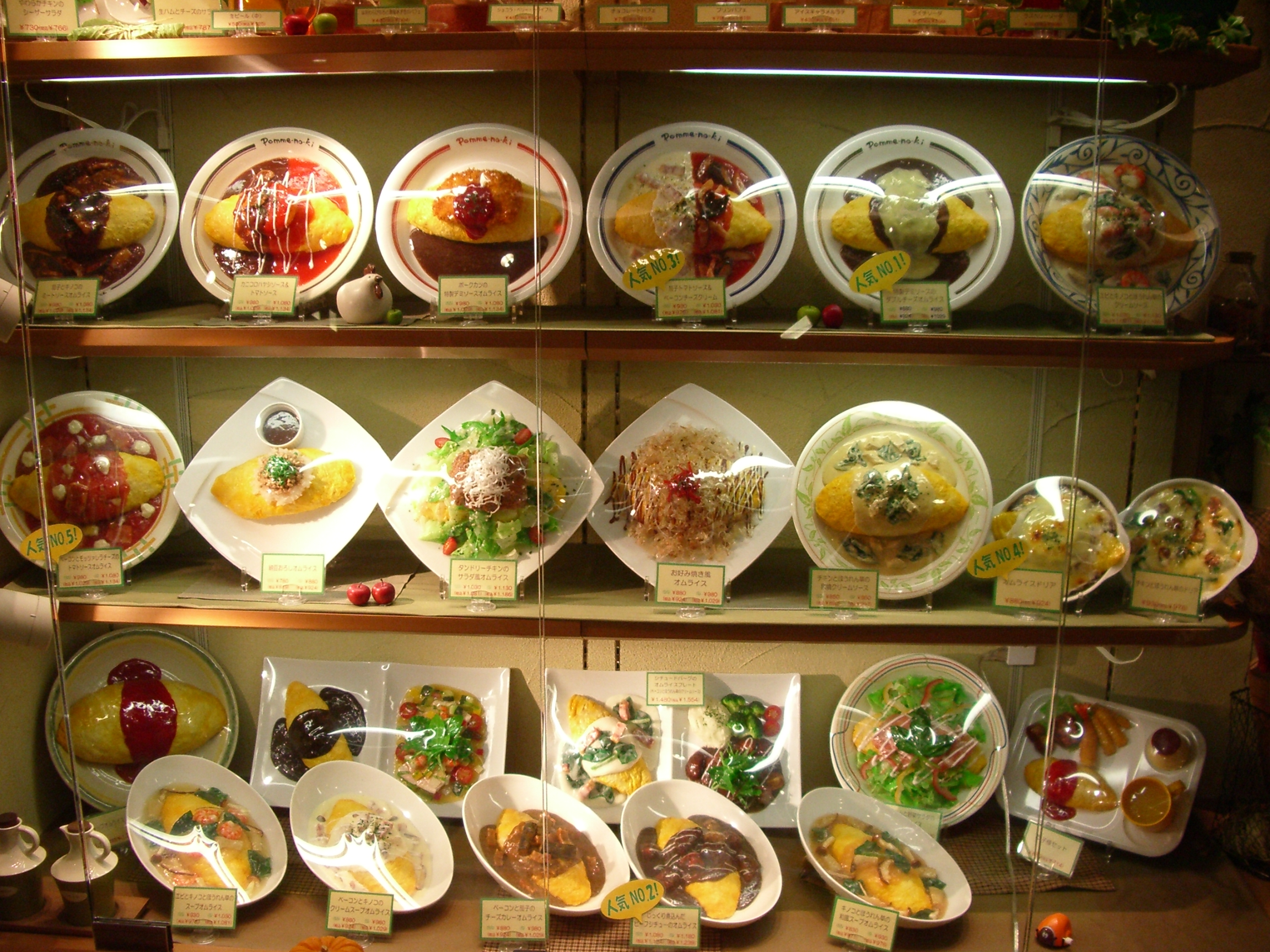
Models of various omurice dishes

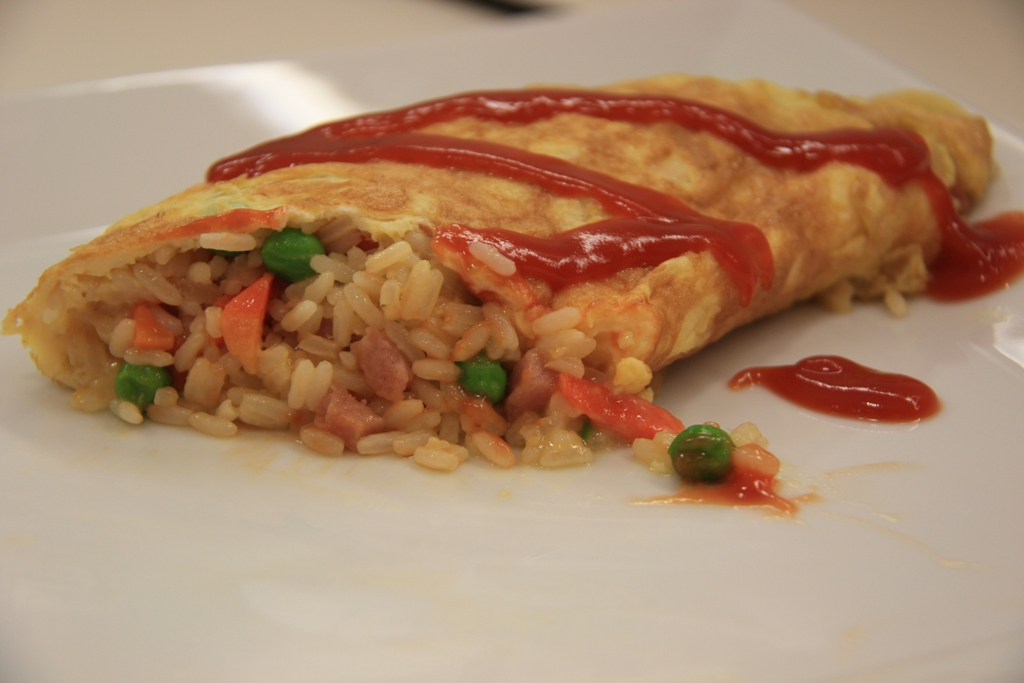
On the inside

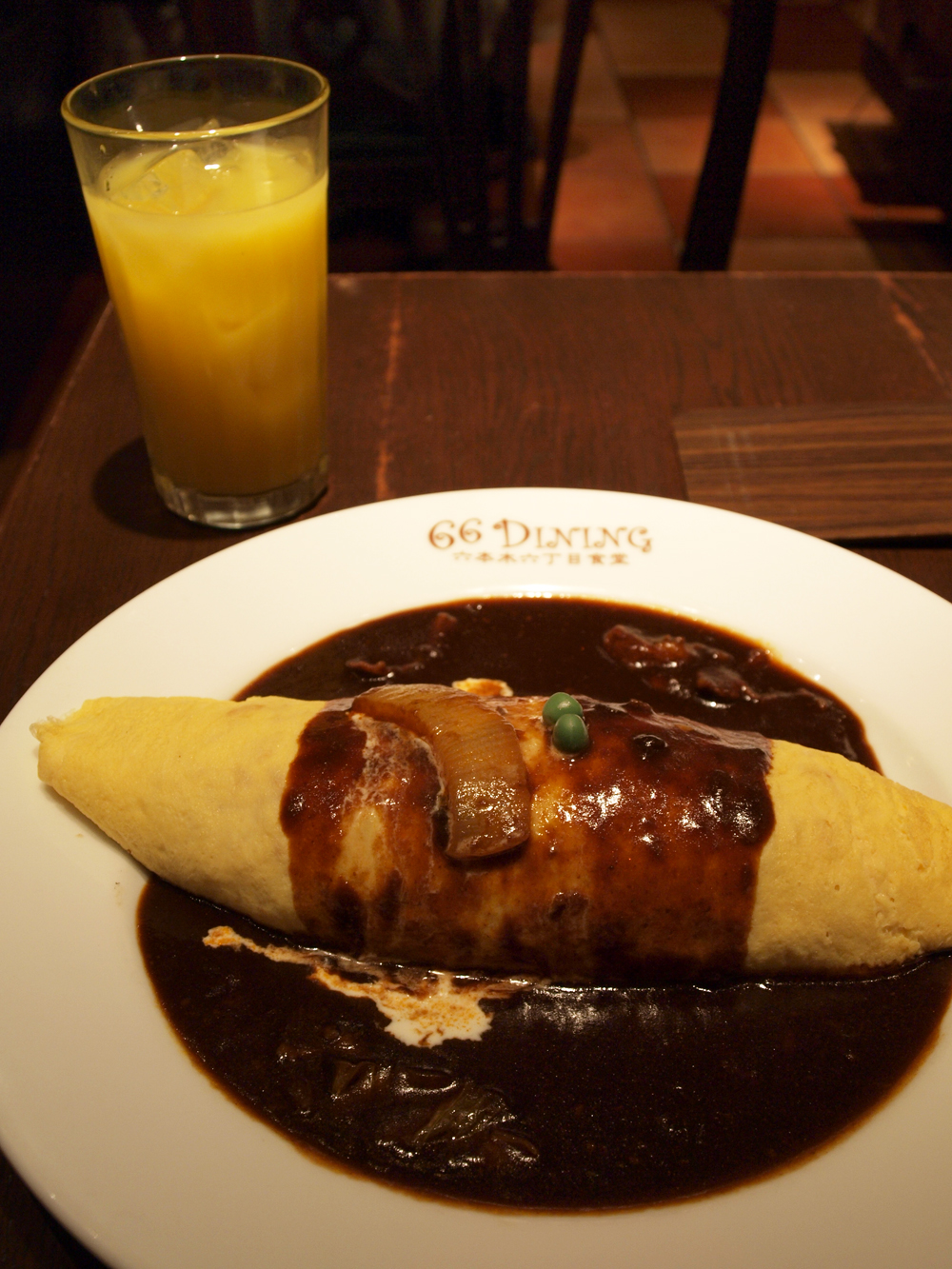
Omurice with demi-glace sauce

Video of the preparation of an omurice dish

Video of cutting open an omurice

== Similar dishes ==
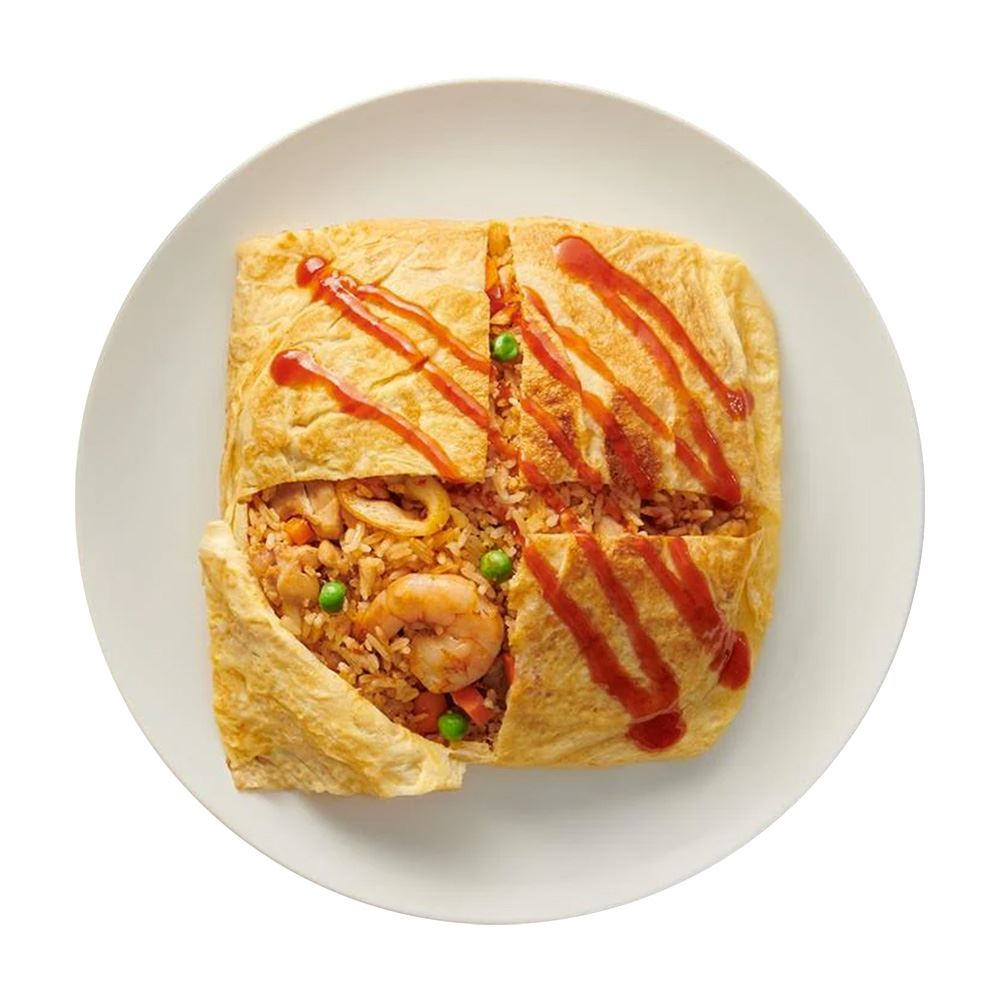
The original Nasi Goreng Pattaya from Malaysia.

A similar dish in Southeast Asia, especially in Malaysia, Thailand and Singapore is called nasi goreng pattaya. It is a fried rice dish, covering chicken fried rice in thin fried egg or omelet.

== In popular culture ==
A new kind of omurice was developed for the 1985 comedy film Tampopo in collaboration with Taimeiken, a famous restaurant in Nihonbashi. This version has the rice covered with a half-cooked omelet, which is cut open to spread and cover the rice. This version has become so popular that it is the restaurant standard now. Home cooks typically cook a thin omelet completely and then place it over the seasoned rice and decorate it with ketchup.

Homestyle omurice is a frequent item on maid café menus since the addition of ketchup allows a maid to decorate the meal easily at the table as a form of service.

In the 2020s, clips of chefs preparing omurice often went viral on social media, leading to an increased international interest in the dish.

== See also ==
- List of egg topics
- List of brunch foods
- List of Japanese foods
- Nasi goreng pattaya
