= Volzhsky District =

Location of the Mari El Republic in Russia

Location of Samara Oblast in Russia

Volzhsky District is the name of several administrative and municipal districts in Russia. The districts are generally named after the Volga River, a major river in Russia.

== Districts of the federal subjects ==
- Volzhsky District, Mari El Republic, an administrative and municipal district of the Mari El Republic
- Volzhsky District, Samara Oblast, an administrative and municipal district of Samara Oblast

== City divisions ==
- Volzhsky City District, a city district of Saratov, the administrative center of Saratov Oblast
Location of Saratov in Russia

== See also ==
- Privolzhsky District
- Volzhsky (disambiguation)
