= Privolzhsky Urban Settlement =

Privolzhsky Urban Settlement or Privolzhskoye Urban Settlement is the name of several municipal formations in Russia.

== Modern urban settlements ==
- Privolzhsky Urban Settlement, a municipal formation which the Urban-Type Settlement of Privolzhsky in Volzhsky District of the Mari El Republic is incorporated as
- Privolzhskoye Urban Settlement, a municipal formation which the town of Privolzhsk in Privolzhsky District of Ivanovo Oblast is incorporated as

== Historical urban settlements ==
- Privolzhskoye Urban Settlement, a former municipal formation which the work settlement of Privolzhsky and three rural localities in Engelssky District of Saratov Oblast were incorporated as before being merged into Engels Urban Settlement effective May 2013

== See also ==
- Privolzhsky (disambiguation)
