= Privolzhsky (inhabited locality) =

Privolzhsky (Russian: Приво́лжский; masculine), Privolzhskaya (Приво́лжская; feminine), or Privolzhskoye (Приво́лжское; neuter) is the name of several inhabited localities in Russia.

Urban localities

- Privolzhsky, Mari El Republic, an urban-type settlement in Volzhsky District of the Mari El Republic
- Privolzhsky, Saratov Oblast, a work settlement in Engelssky District of Saratov Oblast

Rural localities

- Privolzhsky, Nizhny Novgorod Oblast, a settlement in Fokinsky Selsoviet of Vorotynsky District of Nizhny Novgorod Oblast
- Privolzhsky, Republic of Tatarstan, a settlement in Spassky District of the Republic of Tatarstan
- Privolzhsky, Tver Oblast, a settlement in Kimrsky District of Tver Oblast
- Privolzhsky, Volgograd Oblast, a settlement in Privolzhsky Selsoviet of Svetloyarsky District of Volgograd Oblast
- Privolzhsky, Yaroslavl Oblast, a settlement in Klimovsky Rural Okrug of Nekrasovsky District of Yaroslavl Oblast
- Privolzhskoye, Marksovsky District, Saratov Oblast, a selo in Marksovsky District of Saratov Oblast
- Privolzhskoye, Rovensky District, Saratov Oblast, a selo in Rovensky District of Saratov Oblast
