= Volga, Altai Krai =

Volga Волга
- Settlement
- Location within Altai Krai Location within Russia
- Coordinates: 53°37′N 83°59′E
- Country: Russia
- Region: Altai Krai
- District: Pervomaysky District
- Time zone: UTC+7:00

Volga (Russian: Волга) is a rural locality (a settlement) in Pervomaysky Selsoviet, Pervomaysky District, Altai Krai, Russia. The population was 168 as of 2013. There are 2 streets.

== Geography ==
Volga is located 34 km north of Novoaltaysk (the district's administrative centre) by road. Pervomayskoye is the nearest rural locality.
