= Volga Region State University of Physical Culture, Sport and Tourism =

Public university in Kazan, Russia

- Поволжский государственный университет физической культуры, спорта и туризма
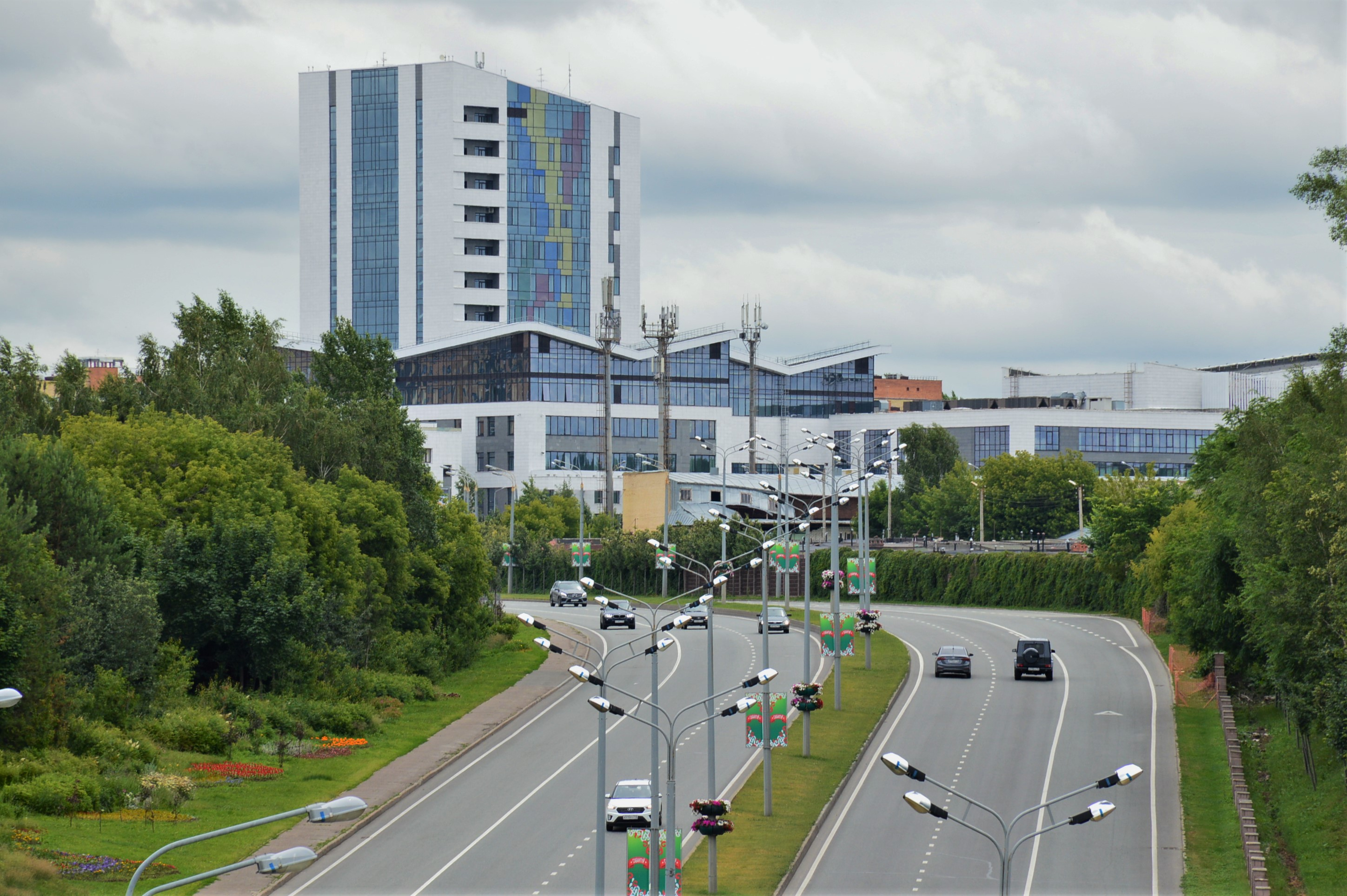
- Former names: Kama State Institute of Physical Culture, Kama State Academy of Physical Culture, Sport and Tourism, Volga Region State Academy of Physical Culture, Sport and Tourism
- Type: public
- Established: 1990
- Rector: Rafis Burganov
- Students: 2800
- Location: Universiade Village, Kazan, Tatarstan, Russia; 55°44′31″N 49°10′46″E
- Campus: urban
- Website: www.sportacadem.ru

The Volga Region State University of Physical Culture, Sport and Tourism (Volga region GUFKSIT University; Russian: Поволжский государственный университет физической культуры, спорта и туризма, Поволжский ГУФКСиТ) is an institute of higher education in Kazan, Russia. It trains physical education teachers, coaches of sports schools, fitness trainers, physical therapy instructors and employees of physical education and rehabilitation centers, sports managers and managers, organizers of mass physical culture and sports events, specialists in the field of tourism and service.

== History ==
In 1974, a branch of the Volgograd State Physical Education Academy was established in Kazan. 12 years later, the branch was transferred to Naberezhnye Chelny, and in 1997, the Kama State Institute of Physical Culture was founded on this basis. In 2006, the institute was achieved the status of academy — it was renamed the Kama State Academy of Physical Culture, Sports and Tourism.

In July 2010, the academy was transferred to Kazan by the Ministry of Sports of the Russian Federation and renamed the Volga State Academy of Physical Culture, Sports and Tourism. The branch in Naberezhnye Chelny was preserved.

In March 2021, it was achieved the status of a university. The institute was renamed the Volga Region State University of Physical Culture, Sport and Tourism.

== Education ==
In the university the education process is organized at 4 faculties:

- Faculty of Sports,
- Faculty of Physical Culture,
- Faculty of Service and Tourism.

Since 2013, the university has been publishing a scientific and theoretical journal in Russian and English "Science and Sport: Current Trends" (Russian: Наука и спорт: современные тенденции).
