= Volzhsky, Astrakhan Oblast =

Volzhsky Волжский
- Settlement
- Location within Astrakhan Oblast Location within Russia
- Coordinates: 46°58′N 47°32′E
- Country: Russia
- Region: Astrakhan Oblast
- District: Yenotayevsky District
- Time zone: UTC+4:00

Volzhsky (Russian: Волжский) is a rural locality (a settlement) and the administrative center of Srednevolzhsky Selsoviet of Yenotayevsky District, Astrakhan Oblast, Russia. The population was 1,771 as of 2010. There are 24 streets.

== Geography ==
Volzhsky is located 65 km southeast of Yenotayevka (the district's administrative centre) by road. Seroglazka is the nearest rural locality.
