= Volga, Russia =

Volga (Russian: Волга) is the name of several rural localities in Russia.

== Modern localities ==
- Volga, Altai Krai, a settlement in Pervomaysky Selsoviet of Pervomaysky District of Altai Krai
- Volga, Republic of Bashkortostan, a village in Imay-Karmalinsky Selsoviet of Davlekanovsky District of the Republic of Bashkortostan
- Volga, Chuvash Republic, a settlement in Nizhnekumashkinskoye Rural Settlement of Shumerlinsky District of the Chuvash Republic
- Volga, Kirov Oblast, a village in Rybno-Vatazhsky Rural Okrug of Kilmezsky District of Kirov Oblast
- Volga, Selizharovsky District, Tver Oblast, a village in Shuvayevskoye Rural Settlement of Selizharovsky District of Tver Oblast
- Volga, Staritsky District, Tver Oblast, a village in Pankovo Rural Settlement of Staritsky District of Tver Oblast
- Volga, Nekouzsky District, Yaroslavl Oblast, a settlement in Volzhsky Rural Okrug of Nekouzsky District of Yaroslavl Oblast
- Volga, Yaroslavsky District, Yaroslavl Oblast, a settlement in Tunoshensky Rural Okrug of Yaroslavsky District of Yaroslavl Oblast

== Renamed localities ==
- Volga, name of Malaya Volga, a village in Selishchenskoye Rural Settlement of Selizharovsky District of Tver Oblast, until April 2014
