= Privolzhsky, Volgograd Oblast =

Privolzhsky Приволжский
- Settlement
- Location within Volgograd Oblast Location within Russia
- Coordinates: 48°14′N 44°34′E
- Country: Russia
- Region: Volgograd Oblast
- District: Svetloyarsky District
- Time zone: UTC+4:00

Privolzhsky (Russian: Приволжский) is a rural locality (a settlement) in Svetloyarsky District, Volgograd Oblast, Russia. The population was 1,220 as of 2010. There are 21 streets.

== Geography ==
Privolzhsky is located 43 km southwest of Svetly Yar (the district's administrative centre) by road. Novosad is the nearest rural locality.
