= Volga (marque) =

Russian car brand

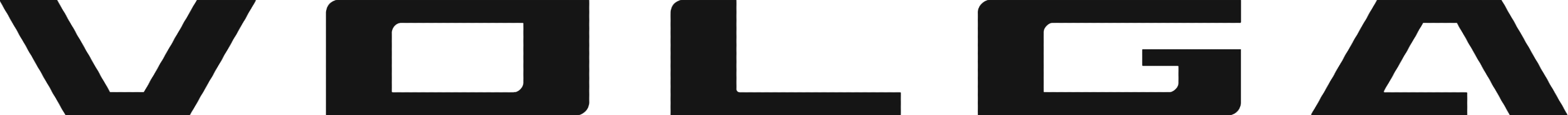
Volga logo (2024-present)

Volga (Russian: Волга) is a Russian, formerly Soviet automotive marque manufactured by the Gorky Automobile Plant (GAZ) in Nizhny Novgorod. (Note: Known as Gorky during the Soviet period)

Volga cars had their roots in the GAZ Volga, a series of executive cars built by the Gorky Automobile Plant. The first car to feature the marque was the GAZ-21 Volga, with production beginning in 1956. Their role in serving the Soviet nomenklatura made the vehicles a contemporary cultural icon, leading to urban legends such as the Black Volga. Vehicles with the Volga name would continue until 2010, with the end of production of the GAZ Volga Siber.

In 2024 it was reported that GAZ would reconstitute the Volga brand for a new series of vehicles, under the joint stock company "Production of Passenger Cars"

== History ==
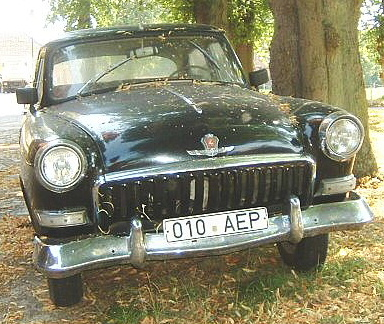
GAZ-21 Volga (second series)

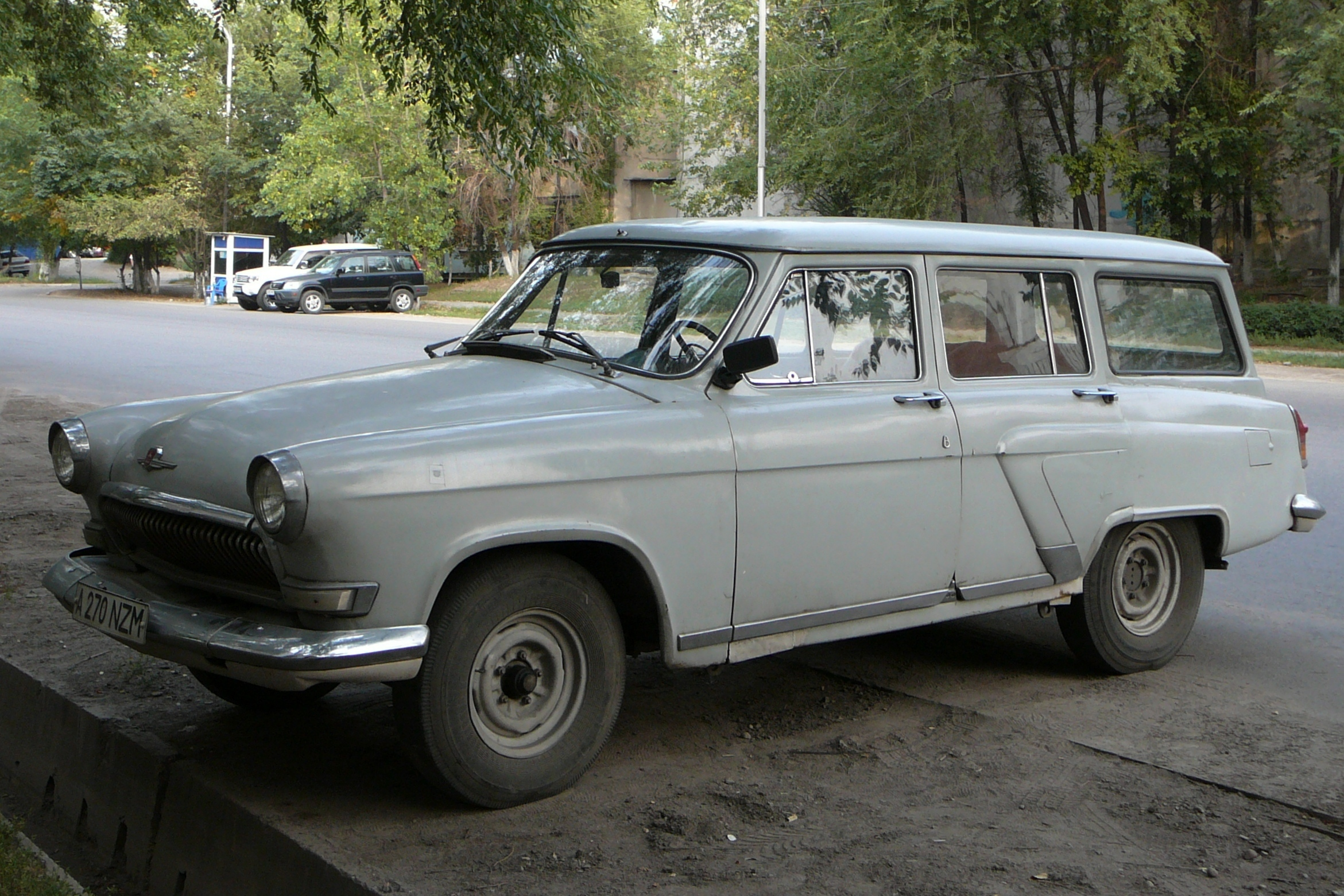
GAZ-22 Volga

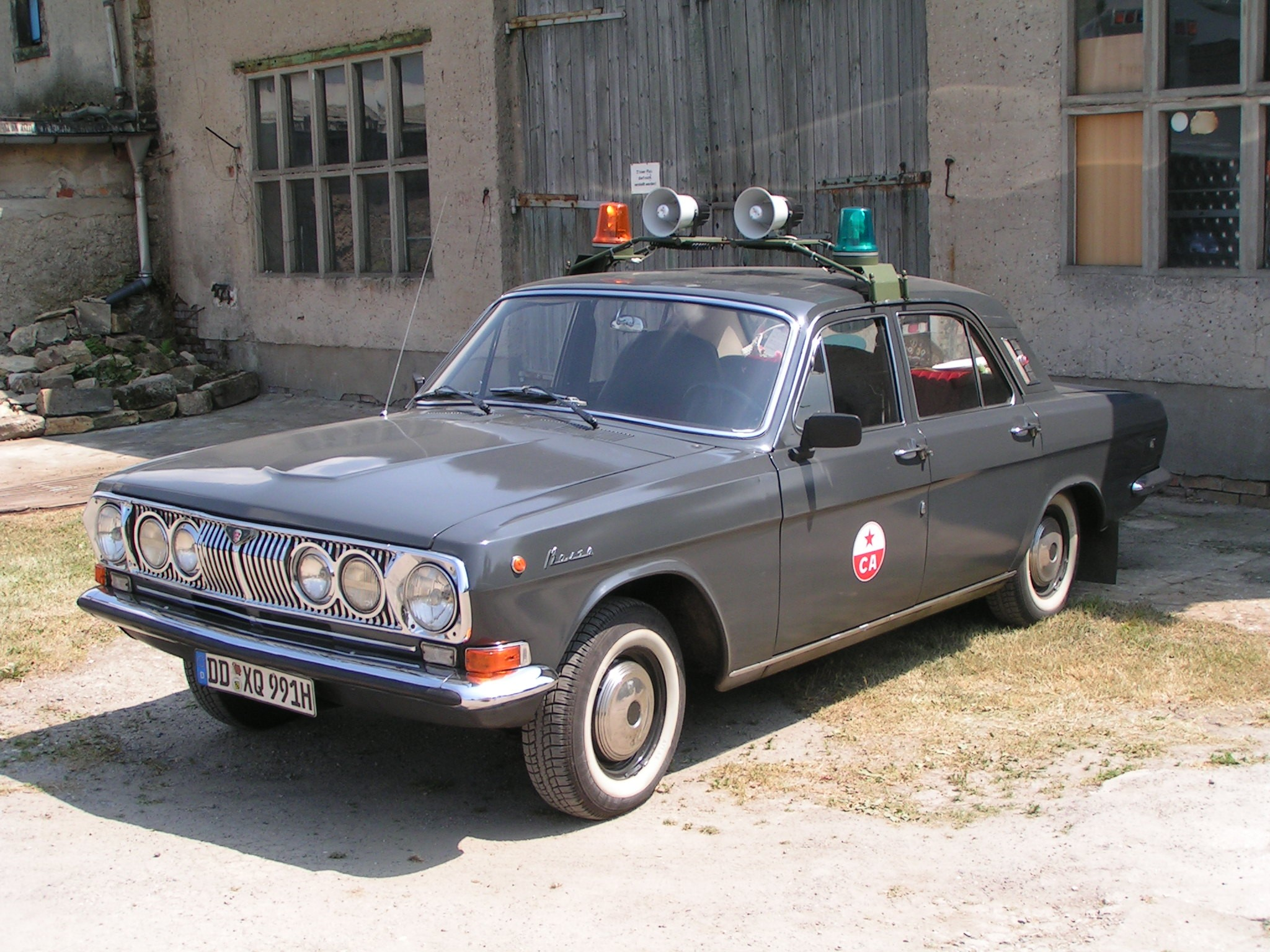
GAZ-24 Volga

=== Discontinuation ===
Originally, the last Volga branded car was supposed to leave the Nizhny Novgorod factory at the end of 2007 so that the company could specialize fully in commercial vehicle production, as it is very well positioned in the highly competitive Russian market, especially with the GAZelle van. Since April 2006, however, the factory management has announced that the Volga "will continue to be built as long as the market needs it." In late 2010, GAZ stopped producing cars due to failed relations with Chrysler.

Later, the company no longer offered passenger cars under its own brands. However, it continues to produce vans, trucks, buses and construction machinery. Since 2012, the Škoda Yeti and since April 2013 the Volkswagen Jetta have been manufactured in Nizhny Novgorod as CKD kits on behalf of Volkswagen. The sale of VW's factories in Russia in the wake of Russia's invasion of Ukraine was delayed by a lawsuit filed by VW's former manufacturing partner GAZ. GAZ had sued VW for damages in the hundreds of millions for terminating the agreement. The lawsuit was dismissed by a Russian court. VW had previously stopped production and asked employees to resign.

=== Revival ===
In 2024, it was announced that the production of automobiles under the Volga brand would resume in 2025.

== Models ==
- GAZ M-21 Volga (1956–1970)
- GAZ-24 Volga (1970–1992)
- GAZ-31 Volga (1982–2010)
- GAZ-3105 Volga (1992–1996)
- GAZ-3111 Volga (2000–2002/2004)
- Volga Siber (2008–2010)
- Volga C40 (2025)
- Volga K30 (2025)
- Volga K40 (2026–present)
- Volga K50 (2026–present)
- Volga C50 (2026–present)
