= Volga rice =

Japanese fried rice dish

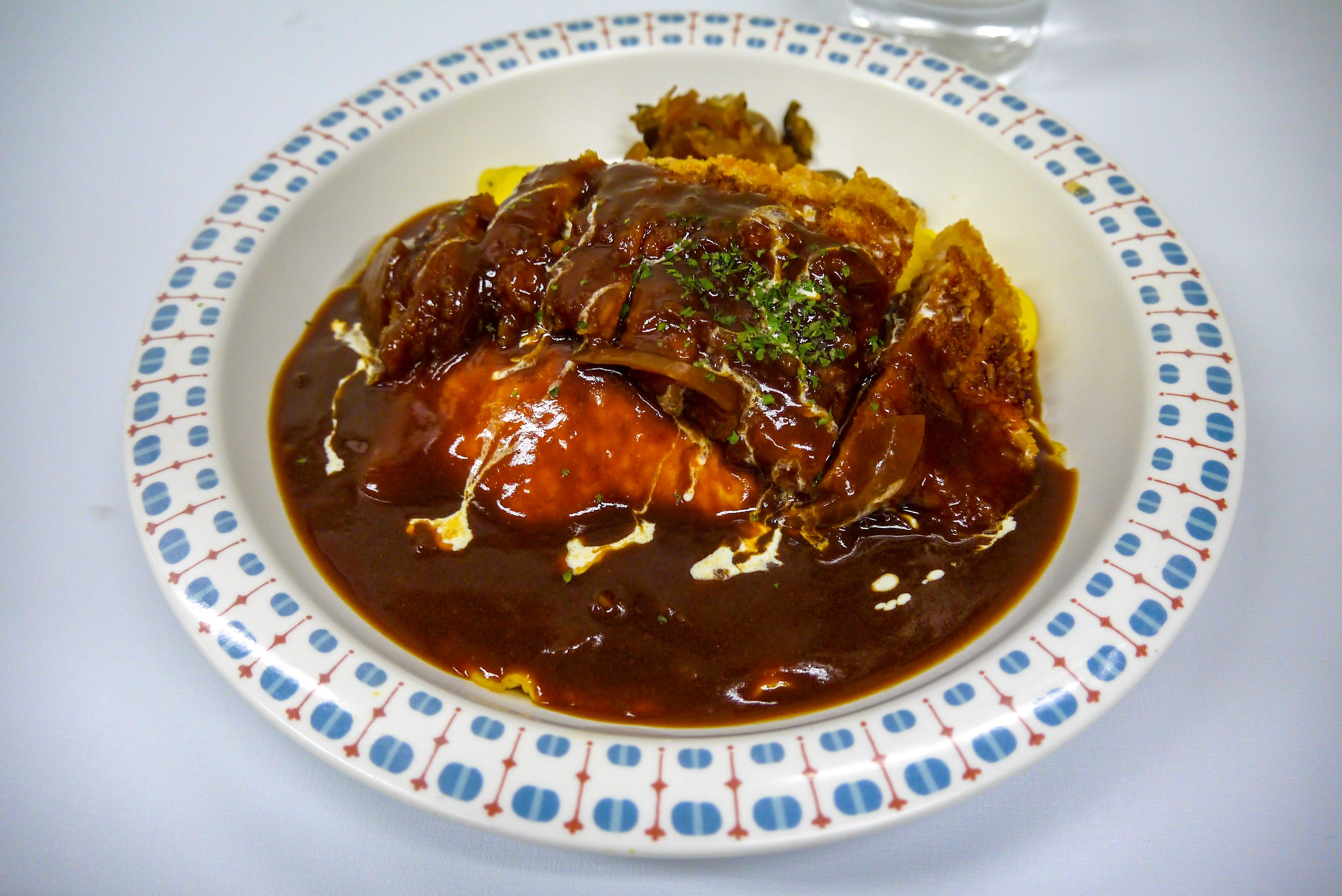
- A plate of Volga rice
- Type: Main course
- Place of origin: Japan
- Region or state: Echizen, Fukui
- Associated cuisine: Japanese cuisine
- Main ingredients: Fried rice, tonkatsu, omelette

Volga rice (sometimes boruga rice) is a fried rice dish popular in Echizen, Fukui Prefecture, Japan. Sometimes classed as one of the Three Delicacies of Echizen alongside oroshi soba and ekimae chuka soba, it is a variant of omurice made of a base of fried rice which is then topped with an omelet and crumb-covered pork cutlet; the whole is then covered in rich sauce. There is no proven explanation for the name "Volga rice", though there are various theories.

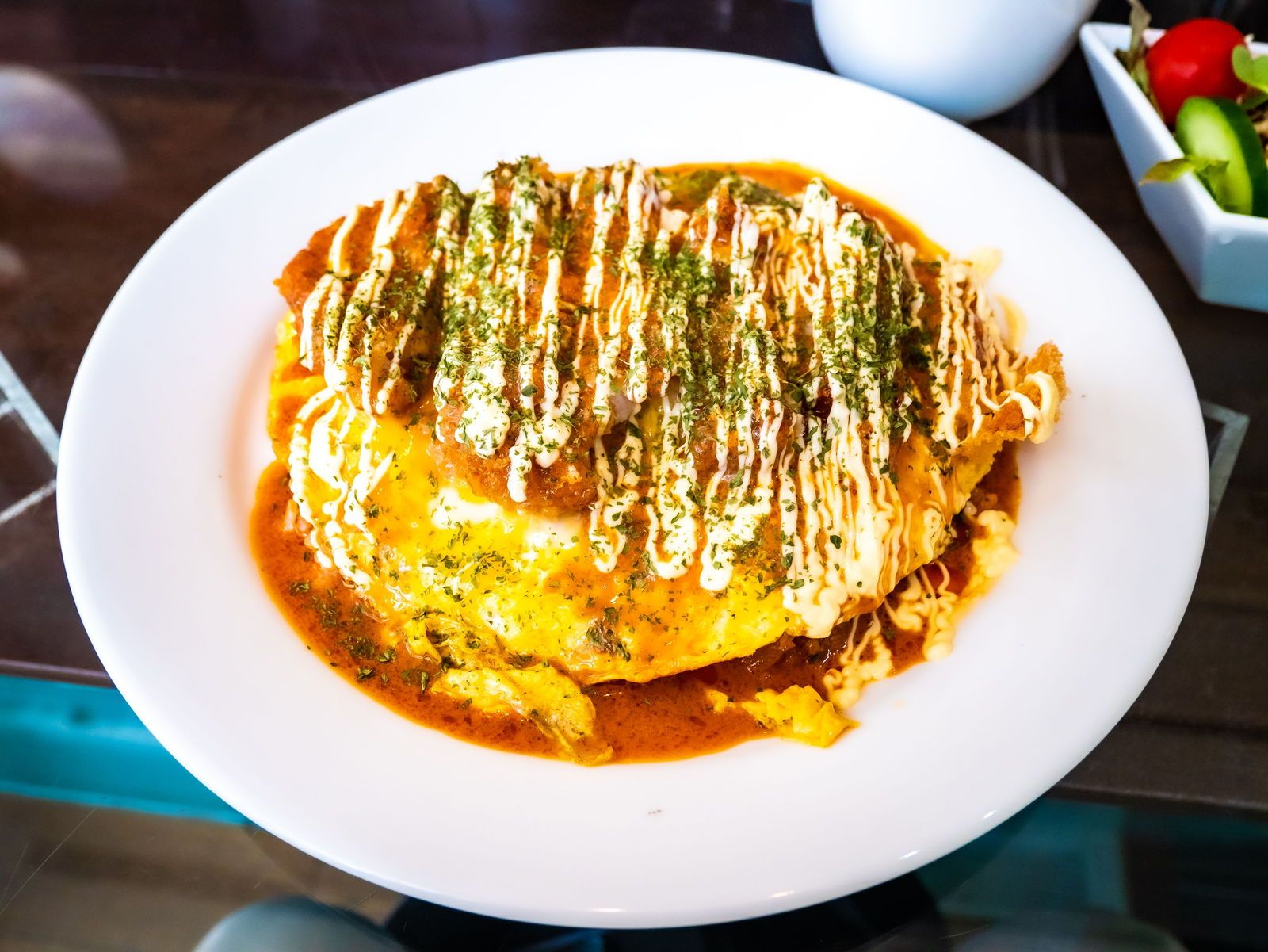
With mayonnaise and nori flakes
